= List of villages and towns depopulated of Jews during the Holocaust =

Below is a partial list of the selected villages and towns (shtetls) depopulated of Jews during the Holocaust. The liquidation actions were carried out mostly by the Nazi Einsatzgruppen and Order Police battalions as well as auxiliary police through mass killings. The German "pacification" units of the Einsatzkommando were paramilitary forces within the Schutzstaffel, under the high command of the Obergruppenführer. The Einsatzgruppen operated primarily in the years 1941–45.

The towns and villages are listed by country, as follows:

== Belarus ==
- Klimovichi
- Antopal
- Berezino
- Chavusy
- Davyd-Haradok
- Grodno (Hrodna) (interwar Poland)
- Ivye
- Lakhva (interwar Poland)
- Luniniec
- Minsk
- Motol
- Obech
- Orpa
- Pinsk
- Polotsk
- Rechke
- Sapotskin
- Shklov
- Slonim (interwar Poland)
- Slutsk
- Śvislač
- Vitebsk

== Crimea ==
- Ak Shiekh
- Alushta
- Dzhankoi
- Evpatoria
- Feodosia
- Kerch
- Lenine
- Livadiya
- Sevastopol
- Simferopol
- Yalta

== Hungary ==
The following Jewish communities in Hungary were either partially or completely destroyed during the Holocaust.

- Aba
- Abádszalók
- Abaújszántó
- Abony
- Ács
- Adony
- Ajak
- Albertirsa
- Albertfalva
- Álmosd
- Alsódabas (Dabas)
- Alsónémedi
- Alsóság
- Alsózsolca
- Anarcs
- Apagy
- Apc
- Apostag
- Aszód
- Babócsa
- Bácsalmás
- Bagamér
- Baja
- Baktalórántháza
- Balad
- Balassagyarmat
- Balatonboglár
- Balatonfüred
- Balatonkiliti
- Balatonszemes
- Balkány
- Balmazújváros
- Belsõbõcs
- Bánhida
- Barabas
- Báránd
- Barcs
- Bátaszék
- Battonya
- Békésmegyer
- Bekecs
- Békés
- Békéscsaba
- Békésszentandrás
- Beled
- Bercel
- Beregsurány
- Berekböszörmény
- Berettyóújfalu
- Bicske
- Biharkeresztes
- Biharnagybajom
- Bodrogkeresztúr
- Boldva
- Bonyhád
- Bököny
- Buda
- Budafok
- Budakalász
- Budapest
- Bugyi
- Buj
- Bűdszentmihály
- Cece
- Cegléd
- Celldömölk
- Cigánd
- Cinkota
- Csabrendek
- Csákvár
- Csány
- Csenger
- Csepel (Csepel–sziget)
- Csepreg
- Csongrád
- Csorna
- Csökmő
- Csomor
- Csurgó
- Debrecen
- Decs
- Demecser
- Derecske
- Dévaványa
- Devecser
- Diósgyőr
- Dombóvár
- Dombrád
- Dömsöd
- Dunaföldvár
- Dunaharaszti
- Dunakeszi
- Dunapataj
- Dunaszekcső
- Dunaújváros
- Dunavecse
- Edelény
- Eger
- Egyek
- Emőd
- Encs
- Encsencs
- Endrőd
- Enying
- Ercsi
- Érd
- Erdőbénye
- Érsekvadkert
- Esztergom
- Fábiánháza
- Farád
- Föld
- Fegyvernek
- Fehérgyarmat
- Felsőgalla
- Felsőgöd
- Felsőireg
- Felsőzsolca
- Fényeslitke
- Fertőszentmiklós
- Forró
- Földes
- Fülesd
- Fülöpszállás
- Füzesabony
- Füzesgyarmat
- Gacsaj
- Gáva
- Gebe
- Gégény
- Gemzse
- Gergelyiugornya
- Gesztely
- Gödöllő
- Gönc
- Göncruszka
- Gorbopincehely
- Gulács
- Gyoma
- Gyón
- Gyömöre
- Gyömrő
- Gyöngyös
- Gyönk
- Győr
- Győrasszonyfa
- Győrszentmárton
- Gyula
- Gyulaháza
- Gyüre
- Hahót
- Hajdúbagos
- Hajdúböszörmény
- Hajdúdorog
- Hajdúhadház
- Hajdúnánás
- Hajdúsámson
- Hajdúszoboszló
- Hajdúszovát
- Halmaj
- Harsány
- Hatvan
- Hejőcsaba
- Hencida
- Hernádnémeti
- Hernádvécse
- Heves
- Hodász
- Hódmezővásárhely
- Hőgyész
- Hosszúpályi
- Ibrány
- Ilk
- Iregszemcse
- Isaszeg
- Izsák
- Jánk (Jánkmajtis)
- Jánoshalma
- Jánosháza
- Jármi
- Jászalsószentgyörgy
- Jászapáti
- Jászárokszállás
- Jászberény
- Jászfényszaru
- Jászkarajenő
- Jászkisér
- Jászladány
- Kaba
- Kadarkút
- Kál
- Kálló
- Kállósemjén
- Kalocsa
- Kántorjánosi
- Kápolnásnyék
- Kaposvár
- Kapuvár
- Karád
- Karcag
- Kecel
- Kecskemét
- Kemecse
- Keszthely
- Kéthely
- Kisbér
- Kiskőrös
- Kiskunfélegyháza
- Kiskunhalas
- Kiskunlacháza
- Kiskunmajsa
- Kisléta
- Kismarja
- Kispest
- Kistarcsa
- Kistelek
- Kisterenye
- Kisújszállás
- Kisvárda
- Kisvarsány
- Kocsord
- Kóka
- Komádi
- Komárom
- Konyár
- Kopócsapáti
- Kótaj
- Körmend
- Kőbánya (Budapest X)
- Körösladány
- Kőszeg
- Kővágóörs
- Kunágota
- Kunhegyes
- Kunmadaras
- Kunszentmárton
- Kunszentmiklós
- Láca
- Lajosmizse
- Laskod
- Legyesbénye
- Letenye
- Levelek
- Lovasberény
- Lőrinci
- Mad
- Maglód
- Mágocs
- Magyarbánhegyes
- Magyaróvár
- Makó
- Mándok
- Marcali
- Máriapócs
- Martonvásár
- Mátészalka
- Medgyesegyháza
- Megyaszó
- Mélykút
- Mérk
- Mezőberény
- Mezőcsát
- Mezőkeresztes
- Mezőkovácsháza
- Mezőkövesd
- Mezőladány
- Mezőszilas
- Mezőtúr
- Mindszent
- Miskolc
- Mohács
- Monok
- Monor
- Mór
- Mosonmagyaróvár
- Nádudvar
- Nagyatád
- Nagybajom
- Nagybaracska
- Nagdobos
- Nagydorog
- Nagyecsed
- Nagyhalász
- Nagykálló
- Nagykanizsa
- Nagykáta
- Nagykőrös
- Nagyléta
- Nagyoroszi
- Nagyrábé
- Nagysimonyi
- Nagytétény
- Nagyvázsony
- Napkor
- Nemesdéd
- Nemesszalók
- Nyékládháza
- Nyírábrány
- Nyíracsád
- Nyiradony
- Nyírbátor
- Nyírbéltek
- Nyírbogát
- Nyírbogdány
- Nyircsaholy
- Nyirderzs
- Nyíregyháza
- Nyirgelse
- Nyirgyulaj
- Nyírjákó
- Nyírkarász
- Nyirlugos
- Nyirmada
- Nyírmártonfalva
- Nyirmeggyes
- Nyírmihálydi
- Nyirtass
- Óbuda
- Ócsa
- Ófehértó
- Okány
- Olaszliszka
- Onga
- Ónod
- Ópályi
- Oros
- Orosháza
- Oroszvár
- Ózd
- Ozora
- Öcsöd
- Őr
- Örkény
- Pácin
- Pacsa
- Paks
- Pápa
- Pásztó
- Pátroha
- Pécel
- Pécs
- Pécsvárad
- Penészlek
- Pestszenterzsébet
- Pestszentimre
- Pestszentlőrinc
- Pestújhely
- Pétervására
- Petneháza
- Pilis
- Pilisvörösvár
- Piricse
- Pocsaj
- Pócspetri
- Polgár
- Polgárdi
- Pomáz
- Porcsalma
- Poroszló
- Pusztadobos
- Putnok
- Püspökladány
- Rácalmás
- Ráckeve
- Rajka
- Rakamaz
- Rákoscsaba
- Rákoskeresztúr
- Rákosliget
- Rákospalota
- Rákosszentmihály
- Ricse
- Sajókaza
- Sajókazinc
- Sajószentpéter
- Salgótarján
- Sály
- Sárbogárd
- Sarkad
- Sárospatak
- Sárrétudvari
- Sárvár
- Sásd
- Sashalom
- Sátoraljaújhely
- Sellye
- Seregélyes
- Siklós
- Simontornya
- Siófok
- Solt
- Soltvadkert
- Somogyszil
- Sopron
- Soroksár
- Sümeg
- Söjtör
- Szabadszállás
- Szabolcsbáka
- Szakoly
- Szamossályi
- Szamosszeg
- Szany
- Szarvas
- Szatmárcseke
- Szatmárököritó
- Szécsény
- Szedres
- Szeged
- Szeghalom
- Szegilong
- Szegvár
- Székesfehérvár
- Szekszárd
- Szendrő
- Szentendre
- Szentes
- Szentgál
- Szentgotthárd
- Szentlőrinc
- Szerencs
- Szigetvár
- Szikszó
- Szil
- Szilasbalhás
- Szob
- Szolnok
- Szombathely
- Tab
- Taktaharkány
- Tállya
- Tamási
- Tápióbicske
- Tápiógyörgye
- Tápiósüly
- Tápiószele
- Tapolca
- Tarcal
- Tarpa
- Tatabánya
- Tatatóváros (Tata)
- Téglás
- Tét
- Tetétlen
- Tibolddaróc
- Tinnye
- Tiszabercel
- Tiszabezdéd
- Tiszabő
- Tiszabűd
- Tiszacsege
- Tiszadada
- Tiszadob
- Tiszadorogma
- Tiszaeszlár
- Tiszaföldvár
- Tiszafüred
- Tiszalök
- Tiszalúc
- Tiszaroff
- Tiszaszalka
- Tiszaszentimre
- Tiszaszentmárton
- Tokaj
- Tolscva
- Tolna
- Tornyospálca
- Tótkomlós
- Tököl
- Törökbálint
- Törökszentmiklós
- Tunyog
- Tura
- Túrkeve
- Tuzsér
- Tyukod
- Újfehértó
- Újkécske
- Újpest
- Vác
- Vaja
- Vajdácska
- Vámosmikola
- Vámospércs
- Várpalota
- Vásárosnamény
- Vasvár
- Vecsés
- Vencsellő
- Veresegyház
- Verpelét
- Vértes
- Veszprém
- Vésztő
- Villány
- Vásárosnamény
- Vizsoly
- Záhony
- Zákány
- Zalaegerszeg
- Zalalövő
- Zalaszentgrót
- Zemplénagárd
- Zirc
- Zsáka
- Zsámbék

== Latvia ==
Jewish communities in the following Latvian cities, towns and villages were destroyed during the Holocaust:

- Aglona
- Aizpute
- Aknīste
- Alūksne
- Ape
- Auce
- Babīte
- Baldone
- Baltinava
- Balvi
- Bauska
- Carnikava
- Cibla
- Dagda
- Daugavpils
- Dobele
- Dundaga
- Engure
- Grobiņa
- Gulbene
- Ilūkste
- Jaunjelgava
- Jēkabpils
- Jelgava
- Jūrmala
- Kandava
- Kārsava
- Koknese
- Krāslava
- Krustpils
- Kuldīga
- Liepāja
- Limbaži
- Līvāni
- Ludza
- Madona
- Nereta
- Ogre
- Pārgauja
- Pāvilosta
- Pļaviņas
- Preiļi
- Priekuļi
- Rēzekne
- Riebiņi
- Riga
- Roja
- Rucava
- Rugāji
- Rūjiena
- Salaspils
- Saldus
- Skrunda
- Smiltene
- Strenči
- Talsi
- Tukums
- Vaiņode
- Valka
- Valmiera
- Varakļāni
- Ventspils
- Viesīte
- Viļaka
- Zilupe

== Lithuania ==
The following Jewish communities in Lithuania were destroyed during the Holocaust. Note that the list includes places in modern, post-1991 Lithuania, some of which were in German-occupied Poland during the war.

- Adutiškis (Haydutsetshik)
- Akmenė (Akmyan)
- Alanta (Avante, Alunte)
- Aleksotas (Aleksot)
- Alsėdžiai (Alsad)
- Alytus (Alíte)
- Antalieptė (Antalept)
- Anykščiai (Aniksht, Aniks)
- Ariogala (Ragole, Eyragole)
- Aukštadvaris (Visokedvor)
- Ąžuolų Būda (Bude)
- Babtai (Bobt)
- Bagaslaviškis (Bogoslavishok)
- Baisogala (Beysegole)
- Balbieriškis (Balbireshok)
- Balninkai (Bolnik)
- Batakiai (Batok)
- Bazilionys (Bazilyan, Padubysys)
- Betygala (Betigole)
- Bezdonys (Bezdan)
- Birštonas (Birshtan)
- Biržai (Birzh)
- Butrimonys (Butrimants)
- Čekiškė (Tsaykishok)
- Čekoniškės (Tsekhanovik)
- Darbėnai (Drobyan)
- Darsūniškis (Darshunishok)
- Daugai (Doyg)
- Daugailiai (Dagel)
- Debeikiai (Dabeyk)
- Dieveniškės (Divenishok)
- Dotnuva (Datneve)
- Druskininkai (Drusgenik)
- Dubingiai (Dubinik)
- Dūkštas (Duksht)
- Dusetos (Dusat)
- Eišiškės (Eyshishok)
- Eržvilkas (Erzvilik)
- Gargždai (Gorzd)
- Garliava (Gudleve, Garleve)
- Gaurė (Gavre)
- Gaveikėnai (Gaviken)
- Gelvonai (Gelvan)
- Giedraičiai (Gedrevits)
- Girkalnis (Girtegole)
- Grinkiškis (Grinkishok)
- Griškabūdis (Grishkabud)
- Gruzdžiai (Gruzd)
- Gudeliai (Gudel)
- Ignalina (Ignaline)
- Inturkė (Inturik)
- Jašiūnai (Yasun)
- Jieznas (Yezne)
- Jonava (Yaneve)
- Joniškėlis (Yonishkel)
- Joniškis (Yanishok)
- Josvainiai (Yasven)
- Jurbarkas (Yurberik, Yurburg)
- Kaišiadorys (Koshedar)
- Kaltanėnai (Koltnyan), near Tauragė
- Kaltinėnai (Koltnyan), near Švenčionys
- Kalvarija (Kalvarye)
- Kamajai (Kamay)
- Kapčiamiestis (Koptsheve)
- Karklėnai (Karklan)
- Kaunas (Kovne)
- Kavarskas (Kovarsk)
- Kazlų Rūda (Kazloverude)
- Kėdainiai (Keydan)
- Kelmė (Kelm)
- Kiduliai (Kidl)
- Klaipėda (Meml)
- Klykoliai (Klikol)
- Krakės (Krok)
- Kražiai (Krozh)
- Krekenava (Krakinove)
- Kretinga (Kretinge)
- Kriukai (Kruk), in Šiauliai region
- Kriūkai (Kruk) in Šakiai region
- Kruonis (Kron)
- Kudirkos Naumiestis (Nayshtot, Nayshtot-Shaki, Nayshtot-Shirvint, Vladivaslov, Dubilaytsh)
- Kuktiškės (Kuktishok)
- Kuliai (Kul)
- Kupiškis (Kupeshok, Slavyansk)
- Kurkliai (Kurkl)
- Kuršėnai (Kurshan)
- Kurtuvėnai (Kurtevyan)
- Kvėdarna (Khveydan, Konstantinove)
- Kvetkai (Kvetke)
- Kybartai (Kibart)
- Labanoras (Labonar)
- Laižuva (Layzeve)
- Latava (Lotove)
- Laukuva (Loykeve)
- Lazdijai (Lazdey)
- Leckava (Latskeve)
- Leipalingis (Leypun)
- Lentvaris (Landverove)
- Linkmenys (Ligmyan)
- Linkuva (Linkeve)
- Liškiava (Lishkeve)
- Liubavas (Lubave)
- Liudvinavas (Ludvinove; Trob)
- Luokė (Luknik)
- Lyduvėnai (Lidevyan)
- Lygumai (Ligum, Ligem)
- Maišiagala (Meysegole)
- Marcinkonys (Martsinkants)
- Marijampolė (Marnpol, Maryampol)
- Mažeikiai (Mazheyk)
- Merkinė (Meritsh)
- Mielagėnai (Malagan)
- Miroslavas (Mireslav)
- Molėtai (Malat)
- Mosėdis (Masyad)
- Musninkai (Musnik)
- Naujamiestis (Nayshtot-Ponevezh)
- Naujasis Daugėliškis (Dogalishok)
- Nemakščiai (Namoksht)
- Nemenčinė (Nementshin)
- Nemunaitis (Nemunayts)
- Nemunėlio Radviliškis (Nay-Radvilishok)
- Nevarėnai (Naveran)
- Obeliai (Abel)
- Onuškis (Hanusishok), in the Trakai region
- Onuškis (Rokiškis) (Anishok), in the Rokiškis region
- Paberžė (Podbereze)
- Pabradė (Podbrodzh)
- Pagiriai (Pagir)
- Pajūris (Payure)
- Pakruojis (Pokroy)
- Pakuonis (Pakon)
- Palanga (Palange)
- Palūšė (Palush)
- Pamūšis (Pamushe)
- Pandėlys (Ponedel)
- Panemunė (Panemune)
- Panemunėlis (Panemunik)
- Panevėžys (Ponevezh)
- Papilė (Popilan)
- Pasvalys (Posvol)
- Pašvitinys (Poshvetin)
- Pikeliai (Pikeln)
- Pilviškiai (Pilvishok)
- Plateliai (Plotl)
- Plungė (Plungyan)
- Pociūnėliai (Patsinel)
- Prienai (Pren)
- Pumpėnai (Pumpyan)
- Punia (Pun)
- Pušalotas (Pushalat)
- Radviliškis (Radvilishok)
- Raguva (Rogeve)
- Ramygala (Remigole)
- Raseiniai (Raseyn)
- Ratnica (Ratnitse)
- Rietavas (Riteve)
- Rokiškis (Rakeshok)
- Rozalimas (Rozalye)
- Rudamina(Rudamin)
- Rūdiškės (Rudishok)
- Rumšiškės (Rumshishok)
- Šakiai (Shaki)
- Salakas (Salok)
- Salantai (Salant)
- Šalčininkai (Soletshnik)
- Saldutiškis (Saldutishok)
- Šalkenė (Shalkene)
- Saločiai (Salat)
- Šaukėnai (Shukyan)
- Šaukotas (Shakot)
- Seda (Syad)
- Šeduva (Shadeve)
- Seirijai (Serey)
- Semeliškės (Semilishok)
- Seredžius (Srednik)
- Šešuoliai (Sheshvil)
- Šėta (Shat)
- Šiaudinė (Shodine)
- Šiaulėnai (Shavlan)
- Šiauliai (Shavl)
- Siesikai (Sheshik)
- Šilalė (Shilel)
- Šilutė (Heydikrug)
- Šiluva (Shidleve)
- Šimkaičiai (Shimkaytsh)
- Simnas (Simne)
- Šimonys (Shimants)
- Širvintos (Shirvint)
- Skapiškis (Skopishok)
- Skaudvilė (Shkudvil)
- Skiemonys (Shkumyan)
- Skuodas (Shkud)
- Smilgiai (Smilg)
- Stajotiškės (Stayatseshik)
- Stakliškės (Stoklishok)
- Subačius (Subotsh)
- Sudargas (Sudarg)
- Surviliškis (Survilishok)
- Suvainiškis (Suvinishok)
- Svėdasai (Shvadotsh)
- Švėkšna (Shvekshin)
- Švenčionėliai (Svintsyanke, Nay-Svintsyan)
- Švenčionys (Svintsyan)
- Taujėnai (Tavyan)
- Tauragė (Tavrik)
- Tauragnai (Toragin)
- Telšiai (Telz)
- Tirkšliai (Tirkshle)
- Trakai (Trok)
- Troškūnai (Trashkun)
- Tryškiai (Trishik)
- Turgeliai (Turgele)
- Turmantas (Turmont)
- Tverai (Tver)
- Tytuvėnai (Tsitevyan)
- Ukmergė (Vilkomir)
- Upyna (Upine)
- Utena (Utyan)
- Užpaliai (Ushpol)
- Užventis (Uzvent)
- Vabalninkas (Abolnik, Vabolnik)
- Vaiguva (Vaygeve)
- Vainutas (Vaynute)
- Valkininkai (Olkenik)
- Vandžiogala (Vendzigole)
- Varėna (Aran)
- Varniai (Vorne)
- Vaškai (Vashki, Konstantinove)
- Vegeriai (Veger)
- Veisiejai (Vishey)
- Veiveriai (Veyver)
- Veiviržėnai (Varzhan)
- Veliuona (Vilon)
- Vidiškis (Vidishok)
- Viduklė (Vidukele)
- Viekšniai (Vekshne)
- Viešintos (Vishinte)
- Vievis (Vevye)
- Vilkaviškis (Vilkovishik)
- Vilkija (Vilki)
- Vilnius (Vilne)
- Virbalis (Virbaln)
- Višakio Rūda (Visokerude)
- Vištytis (Vishtenits)
- Vyžuonos (Vizhun)
- Ylakiai (Yelok)
- Žagarė (Zager)
- Zapyškis (Sapizishok, Panemune)
- Zarasai (Nay-Aleksander, Senderke, Ezherene)
- Žarėnai (Zharan)
- Žasliai (Zosle)
- Žeimelis (Zemlin)
- Žeimiai (Zeym)
- Želva (Zelve, Podzelve)
- Žemaičių Naumiestis (Nayshtot-Tavrik, Sugind)
- Židikai (Zhidik)
- Žiežmariai (Zezmer)

== Poland ==
- Baranów Sandomierski
- Bardejov (Slovakia, bordering Poland)
- Będzin
- Bełchatów
- Bełżyce
- Białobrzegi
- Białystok
- Bielsk-Podlaski
- Bilgoraj
- Bircza
- Błażowa
- Bochnia
- Bobowa
- Brody
- Brzeźnica
- Brzozów
- Bukowsko
- Bychawa
- Bytom
- Chełm
- Chęciny
- Chmielnik
- Chodel
- Ciechanów
- Czeladź
- Czemierniki
- Częstochowa
- Czyżew
- Dąbrowa Tarnowska
- Dąbrowa Górnicza
- Dębica
- Dorohusk
- Dubienka
- Dukla
- Dynów
- Działoszyn
- Firlej
- Frampol
- Frysztak
- Gąbin
- Garwolin
- Głogów Małopolski
- Głowaczów
- Głowno
- Gorlice
- Gostynin
- Góra Kalwaria
- Grębów
- Gorzków
- Grabowiec
- Grodzisk Mazowiecki
- Grójec
- Horodlo
- Hrubieszów
- Iłża
- Inowłódz
- Izbica Lubelska
- Iwaniska
- Jabłonka
- Janów Lubelski
- Janów Sokolski
- Jarczów
- Jarosław
- Jasło
- Jedwabne
- Kamieńsk
- Kańczuga
- Kielce
- Kiernozia
- Kleczew
- Klimontów
- Knyszyn
- Kock
- Kolbuszowa
- Kolno
- Kosin
- Komarów-Osada
- Koprzywnica
- Korczyna
- Kozienice
- Kraków
- Krasnobród
- Krasnosielc
- Krasnystaw
- Krosno
- Kryłów
- Łaszczów
- Łańcut
- Łask
- Lelów
- Leżajsk
- Łódź
- Lomazy
- Łomża
- Łosice
- Lubaczów
- Lubartów
- Lublin
- Majdan Tatarski
- Majdan Królewski
- Międzyrzec Podlaski
- Mielec
- Mińsk Mazowiecki
- Mława
- Modliborzyce
- Mstów
- Mszczonów
- Nałęczów
- Niebylec
- Nowy Dwór
- Nowy Korczyn
- Nowy Sącz
- Nowy Wiśnicz
- Nur
- Olkusz
- Opatów
- Opole Lubelskie
- Osjaków
- Opoczno
- Ostrołęka
- Ostrów Mazowiecka
- Oświęcim
- Ożarów
- Pabianice
- Parczew
- Piaski Luterskie
- Pilica
- Pilzno
- Piotrków Trybunalski
- Płock
- Połaniec
- Przedecz
- Przemyśl
- Przeworsk
- Radom
- Radomsko
- Radomyśl Wielki
- Radziłów
- Radzyń Podlaski
- Raniżów
- Rejowiec
- Ropczyce
- Różan
- Rozwadów
- Ruda Opalin
- Rymanów
- Rzeszów
- Sanniki
- Sandomierz
- Sanok
- Sawin
- Sędziszów Małopolski
- Sejny
- Sidra
- Siedliszcze
- Skryhiczyn
- Sławków
- Sochocin
- Sokołów Małopolski
- Sompolno
- Sosnowiec
- Sosnowica
- Staszów
- Staw
- Strzyżów
- Supraśl
- Suwałki
- Świerże
- Szczebrzeszyn
- Szczerców
- Szczuczyn
- Tarnobrzeg
- Tarnogród
- Tarnów
- Tyrawa Wołoska
- Tomaszów Lubelski
- Tomaszów Mazowiecki
- Tomaszowka
- Trochenbrod
- Trzcianne
- Turobin
- Tyczyn
- Tykocin
- Tyszowce
- Uchanie
- Ulanów
- Urzędów
- Warsaw
- Warka
- Warta
- Widawa
- Wielkie Oczy
- Wizna
- Włoszczowa
- Wojsławice
- Wysokie Lubelskie
- Wysokie Mazowieckie
- Wyszogród
- Zabłudów
- Żabno
- Zakroczym
- Zakrzowek
- Zolkiewka
- Zambrów
- Zamość
- Zduńska Wola
- Zelów
- Zgierz
- Żmigród Nowy
- Żołynia

== Romania ==
- Alba Iulia
- Bacău
- Baia Mare
- Bârlad
- Bistrița
- Botoșani
- Brașov
- Brăila
- Buhuși
- Câmpulung Moldovenesc
- Carei
- Cluj-Napoca
- Constanța
- Darabani
- Dej
- Dorohoi
- Focșani
- Galați
- Gura Humorului
- Hârlău
- Huși
- Iași
- Jibou
- Mihăileni, Botoșani
- Odobești
- Oradea
- Pașcani
- Petroșani
- Piatra Neamț
- Radevits
- Satu Mare
- Săveni
- Sighetu Marmației
- Siret
- Suceava
- Ștefănești, Botoșani
- Târgu Frumos
- Târgu Mureș
- Târgu Neamț
- Târnăveni
- Tecuci
- Timișoara
- Vaslui
- Vișeu de Sus

== Russia ==
- Aleksandrovka
- Alekseyevskoye
- Armavir
- Balabanovka
- Belaya Glina
- Belgorod
- Bely
- Bezhanitsy
- Bogdanovka
- Borovichi
- Bryansk
- Burlatskoye
- Cherkessk
- Chikachevo
- Chudovo
- Darmoyedov
- Dedovichi
- Demidov
- Desnogorsk
- Dmitriev-L'govskii
- Dno
- Dorogobuzh
- Dubovoye
- Dubrovka
- Elista
- Fatezh
- Ganshtakovka
- Georgiyevsk
- Gdov
- Gusino
- Gzhatsk
- Idritsa
- Il'ino
- Kagal'nitskaya
- Kalinin
- Kaluga
- Karachev
- Khislavichi
- Kikerino
- Kingisepp
- Kislovka
- Kislovodsk
- Kholm
- Kletnya
- Klimovo
- Klintsy
- Klin
- Kolovert'
- Korocha
- Krasnaya Gora
- Krasnodar
- Krasno-Vostochnyi
- Krasnoye Selo
- Krasnyi
- Kursk
- Kurskaya
- Labinsk
- Ladozhskaya
- Lgov
- Lindemannstadt
- Lisino-Korpus
- Litvinovka
- Loknya
- Lopne
- Lubań'
- Luga
- Lugovets Novoselsky
- Lyubavichi
- Malchevskaya
- Maloyaroslavets
- Maykop
- Mechetinskaya
- Menzhinskoye
- Mešcerskie Dvory
- Meshovskaya
- Mezhno
- Mga
- Mglin
- Mikulino
- Mikoyanshahar
- Monastyrshchina
- Morozovsk
- Mozdok
- Mozhaysk
- Mtsensk
- Nal'chik
- Naro-Fominsk
- Navyla
- Nevel
- Nikolayevka
- Novyy Oskol
- Novocherkassk
- Novo Georgiyevsk
- Novolisino
- Novorossyisk
- Novozybkov
- Oboyan
- Opochka
- Orel
- Oredezh
- Ostrov
- Pekhnetsky
- Peschankopskoye
- Petergof
- Petrovichi
- Petrovskoye
- Pskov
- Pochep
- Pochinok
- Pogar
- Porech'e
- Porkhov
- Proletarsky
- Prudnoye
- Pushkin
- Pustoshka
- Pyatigorsk
- Rebelsk
- Remontnoye
- Roslavl'
- Rostov-on-Don
- Rozhdestveno
- Rudnya
- Rylsk
- Ryndino
- Rzhev
- Sablino
- Saguny
- Salsk
- Sebezh
- Shakhty
- Shchigry
- Shlisselburg
- Siversky
- Sivoritsy
- Shumyachi
- Skopin
- Slantsy
- Smolensk
- Sol'tsy
- Sotnikovskoye
- Spas-Demensk
- Spasskoye
- Staraya Russa
- Starodub
- Slutsk
- Stalingrad
- Stary Oskol
- Stodolishche
- Strelna
- Sudzha
- Sukhinichi
- Surazh
- Susanino
- Svyatsk
- Sychevka
- Taganrog
- Tai
- Tatarsk
- Taysky
- Teberda
- Temirgoyevskaya
- Tikhoretsk
- Tim
- Torkovichsky
- Toropets
- Tosno
- Trubchevsk
- Tuchkovo
- Unecha
- Ust-Labinsk
- Usvyaty
- Velikiye Luki
- Velizh
- Voronezh
- Voroshilovsk
- Vyazma
- Vyritsa
- Yartsevo
- Yelizavetinsky
- Yershichi
- Yessentuki
- Zamoskob'ye
- Zelenchukskaya
- Zernovy
- Zheleznovodsk
- Zlynka

== Slovenia ==
- Beltinci
- Lendava
- Murska Sobota

== Moldova ==
- Alexăndreni
- Bălți
- Berlinți
- Briceni
- Chișinău
- Edineț

== Ukraine ==
- Bar
- Bibrka
- Belz
- Berdychiv
- Berehove
- Berezhany
- Bila Tserkva
- Bolekhiv
- Boryslav
- Borzna
- Boiany
- Brody
- Bratslav
- Buchach
- Budaniv
- Bukachivtsi
- Burshtyn
- Chernihiv
- Chernivtsi
- Chernobyl
- Chortkiv
- Delyatin
- Derazhnia
- Dolyna
- Drohobych
- Dunaivtsi
- Gorodenka
- Halych
- Husiatyn
- Horodok
- Hornostaypil
- Ivano-Frankivsk (Stanisławów)
- Justingrad
- Kalynivka
- Kalush
- Kamianets-Podilskyi
- Khorostkiv
- Khotyn
- Komsomolske
- Kolki
- Kolomyia
- Korolevo
- Kopychintsy
- Kosiv
- Kovel
- Kremenets
- Kupel
- Kuty
- Lityn (Літин)
- Letychiv
- Liuboml
- Lozisht
- L'vove
- Lutsk
- Lwów
- Liubar
- Makariv
- Medzhybizh
- Melnytsia-Podilska
- Mikulints
- Mukachevo
- Murafa
- Nadvirna
- Nemyriv
- Nizhyn
- Novohrad-Volynskyi
- Olhopil
- Olesko
- Olyka
- Ottynia
- Ozeryany
- Pavoloch
- Pliskov
- Podgaytsy
- Pidkamin
- Pohrebysche
- Polonnoye
- Pomortsy
- Poninka
- Pryluky
- Probezhna
- Rachmastrivka
- Rava-Ruska
- Rohatyn
- Rivne
- Rozdol
- Rozhniativ
- Ruzhyn
- Sadagóra
- Sambir
- Savran
- Seletin
- Sharhorod
- Shchirets
- Shepetivka
- Shpykiv
- Shumskoye
- Skala-Podilska (Skala on the River Zbrucz)
- Skalat
- Skvyra
- Slavuta
- Snyatyn
- Snitkov
- Sosnovoye
- Stara Syniava
- Starokonstinntyniv
- Stepan
- Storozhynets
- Stryi
- Sukhostav
- Tarashcha
- Teofipol
- Tetiev
- Terebovlya
- Tlumach
- Tluste
- Trostyanets
- Trochinbrod
- Tuchin
- Ulashkovtse
- Uman
- Uzhhorod
- Verkhny Bystryi
- Vishnevets
- Volochisk
- Voynilov
- Vyzhnytsia
- Yavoriv
- Yablanov
- Yagelnitsa
- Zabolotov
- Zalishchyky
- Zbarazh
- Zhmerynka
- Zhovkva
- Zhydachiv
- Zinkiv
- Zlatopol
- Zolochiv

== See also ==
- List of shtetls
- Shtetl
- Where Once We Walked
