= List of shtetls =

This list of shtetls and shtots (eastern European towns and cities with significant pre-Holocaust Jewish populations) is organized by country.

Some villages that are listed at Yad Vashem have not been included here.

== Shtetls ==
=== Belarus ===
Town	Yiddish Name		Pre-Holocaust Jewish population	Notes
Town	Hebrew	Latin	Pre-Holocaust Jewish population	Notes
Antopal	אנטיפאָליע	Antipolye	1,792 (1921)	Town survived, but all Jews were exterminated.
Byerazino	בערעזין	Berezin		Town survived, but all Jews were exterminated.
Brahin	בראָהין	Brohin	2,254 (1897)	Town survived.
Chawusy	טשאָוס	Tshous	7,444 (1897)	Town survived.
Davyd-Haradok	דאַװיד האָראָדוק	David Horoduk	4,350 (1940)	City survived, but nearly all Jews were exterminated.
Hrodno	גראָדנע	Grodne	~25,000 (1940)	City survived, but nearly all Jews were exterminated.
Hlybokaye	גלובאָק	Glubok		Compare Lithuanian name Glubokas. Town survived.
Iwye	אײװיע	Eyvye		City survived.
Kamyenyets	קאַמעניץ	Kamenitz		Town survived, but nearly all Jews were exterminated.
Lakhwa	לאַכװע	Lakhve	~2,300 (1940)	Town survived, but most Jews were exterminated.
Luninets	לונינײץ	Luninyitz		Town survived.
Mahilyow	מאָלעװ	Molev	21,500 (1897)	City survived.
Motal	מאָטעלע	Motele	1,354 (1937)	Town survived, but nearly all Jews were exterminated.
Obech				Town survived.
Polatsk	פּאָלאָצק	Polotzk		City survived.
Ruzhany	ראָזשינאָי	Rozhinoi	~3,500 (1940)	Town survived, but nearly all Jews were exterminated.
Sapotskin	סאפעטקין	Sapetkin	1,300 (1941)	Town survived, but nearly all Jews were exterminated.
Shklow	שקלאָװ	Shklov	2,132 (1939)	Town survived, but all Jews were exterminated.
Slonim	סלאָנים	Slonim	10,000+ (1940)	City survived, but nearly all Jews were exterminated.
Slutsk	סלוצק	Slutzk	10,264 (1897)	City survived, but nearly all Jews were exterminated. Tens of thousands killed in the Slutsk affair.
Stolin	סטאָלין	Stolin	7,000+ (1940)	Town survived, but all Jews were exterminated.
Svislach	סװיסלאָװיטש	Svislovitsh	600-700 (1940)	Town survived, but all Jews were exterminated. See Svisloch Ghetto Liquidation.^{[ru]}
Turaw	טוראָװ	Turov		Compare Russian name Туров (Turov). Town survived, but nearly all Jews were exterminated.
Yaremichy^{[be]}	יערעמיטש	Yeremitsh	248 (in 1897)	Town survived.

=== Lithuania ===
Town	Yiddish Name		Pre-Holocaust Jewish population	Notes
Town	Hebrew	Latin	Pre-Holocaust Jewish population	Notes
Alytus	אליטע	Alite		City survived.
Anykščiai	אניקשט	Aniksht	2,754 (1900)	Town survived.
Balbieriškis	באלבירישאָק	Balbirishok		Town survived.
Biržai	בירזש	Birzh	2,400 (1941)	Town was razed and all Jews were exterminated. Later rebuilt.
Butrimonys	בוטרימאַנץ	Butrimantz		Town survived, but all Jews were exterminated.
Dieveniškės	דיװענישאָק	Divenishok		Town survived, but all Jews were exterminated.
Eišiškės	אײשישאָק	Eyshishok		City survived, but all Jews were exterminated.
Gargždai	גאָרזשד	Gorzhd		City survived.
Jonava	יאָנאװא	Yonava		City survived, but all Jews were exterminated.
Joniškėlis	יאָנישקעל	Yonishkel		City survived, but all Jews were exterminated.
Josvainiai	יאָסװען	Yosven	534 (1897)	Town survived, but all Jews were exterminated.
Jurbarkas	יורבורג	Yurburg	1,887 (1931)	City survived, but nearly all Jews were exterminated.
Kaišiadorys	קאָשעדאַר	Koshedar		City survived, but all Jews were exterminated.
Kalvarija	קאלװאריע	Kalvarye		City survived.
Kapčiamiestis	קאָפּטשעװע	Koptsheve		Town was largely destroyed and all Jews were exterminated. Later rebuilt.
Kėdainiai	קײדאן	Keydan	3,000 (1941)	City survived, but all Jews were exterminated.
Kelmė	קעלם	Kelm	2,710 (1897)	City survived, but most Jews were exterminated.
Klaipėda	מעמל	Meml		City survived, but was almost completely abandoned.
Krakės	קראָק	Krok		Town survived, but most Jews were exterminated.
Kražiai	קראָזש	Krozh		Town survived, but all Jews were exterminated.
Kretinga	קרעטינגע	Kretinge		Town survived, but all Jews were exterminated.
Kupiškis	קופישוק	Kupishuk		See also: History of the Jews of Kupiskis City survived, but all Jews were exterminated.
Kurkliai	קורקלע	Kurkle		Town survived, but all Jews were exterminated.
Kvėdarna	כװידאן	Khvidan		Town survived, but all Jews were exterminated.
Kybartai	קיבאַרט	Kibart		City survived, but all Jews were exterminated.
Lazdijai	לאַזדײ	Ladzey		City survived.
Leipalingis	לײפּון	Leipun		Town survived.
Lygumai	ליגעם	Ligem		Town survived, but all Jews were exterminated.
Marijampolė	מאַריאַמפּאָל	Mariampol		City survived, but most Jews were exterminated.
Mažeikiai	מאַזשײק	Mazheik		City survived.
Merkinė	מערעטש	Meretsh		Town survived.
Nemenčinė	נעמענטשין	Nementshin		City survived.
Obeliai	אָבעל	Obel		City survived, but all Jews were exterminated.
Pakruojis	פּאָקראָי	Pokroy		City survived.
Pandėlys	פּאָנעדעל	Ponedel		City survived, but all Jews were exterminated.
Panemunė	פּאַנעמון	Panemun		City survived.
Panevėžys	פאָנעװעזש	Ponevezh		City survived, but nearly all Jews were exterminated.
Pasvalys	פּאָסװאָל	Posvol		Town survived.
Pilviškiai	פילװשאָק	Pilvshok		Town survived.
Plungė	פלונגיאן	Plungyan		City survived, but nearly all Jews were exterminated.
Prienai	פּרען	Pren		City survived, but nearly all Jews were exterminated.
Rozalimas	ראָזאַליע	Rozalye		Town survived, but all Jews were exterminated.
Rudamina	רודאַמין	Rudamin		Town survived.
Rumšiškės	רומשישאָק	Rumshishok		Town survived, but all Jews were exterminated.
Salantai	סאַלאַנט	Salant		Town survived.
Seirijai	סערײ	Serey		Town survived.
Simnas	סימנע	Simne		City survived.
Skapiškis	סקאָפּישאָק	Skopishok		Town survived.
Skaudvilė	שקודװיל	Shkudvil		City survived.
Stakliškės	סטאָקלישאָק	Stoklishok		Town survived.
Šeduva	שאַדעװע	Shadeve		City survived, but all Jews were exterminated.
Šiaulėnai	שאַװלאַן	Shavlan		Town survived.
Šiauliai	שאװל	Shavl		City survived, but most Jews were exterminated.
Švenčionys	סװינציאן	Svintzyan		Town survived.
Taujėnai	טאַװיאַן	Tavian		Town survived.
Tauragė	טװריק	Tavrik		City was destroyed and most Jews were exterminated. Later rebuilt.
Tauragnai	טאָראָגין	Taragin		Town survived.
Telšiai	טעלז	Telz	2,800 (1939)	City survived, but most Jews were exterminated.
Troškūnai	טראַשקון	Trashkun		City survived, but all Jews were exterminated.
Tryškiai	טרישיק	Trishik		Town survived.
Ukmergė	װילקאָמיר	Vilkomir		City survived, but many Jews were exterminated.
Utena	אוטיאן	Utyan		City survived.
Užpaliai	אװשפּאָל	Avshpol	691 (1897)	Town survived, but all Jews were exterminated.
Varėna	אָראן	Oran		City survived, but all Jews were exterminated.
Varniai	װאָרנע	Vorne		City survived.
Vaškai	װאַשקי	Vashki		Town survived.
Veisiejai	װיסײ	Visey		Town survived.
Vilijampolė	סלאַבאָדקע	Slabodke		Town survived.
Virbalis	װירבאלן	Virbaln		Town survived.
Vištytis	װישינעץ	Vishtinetz		Town survived.
Žemaičių Naumiestis	נײשטאָט טאװריק	Neishtot Tavrik		Town survived.
Žagarė	זשאגאר	Zhagar		City survived, but all Jews were exterminated.
Žasliai	זאָסלע	Zosle		City survived, but all Jews were exterminated.
Žeimelis	זײמל	Zeiml		Town survived.
Želva	פּאָדזעלװע	Podzelve		Town survived, but all Jews were exterminated.
Židikai	זשידיק	Zhidik		Town survived.

=== Poland ===
Town	Yiddish Name		Pre-Holocaust Jewish population	Notes
Town	Hebrew	Latin	Pre-Holocaust Jewish population	Notes
Będzin	בענדין	Bendin		City survived.
Bełchatów	בעלכאַטאָװ	Belkhatov		Town survived.
Białobrzegi	בזשאַלעבזשעג	Bzhalebzheg		Town survived.
Bielsk Podlaski	בילסק	Bilsk		Town survived.
Bircza	בערטש	Bertsh		Town survived.
Błażowa	בלאזשאָװ	Blazhov		Town survived.
Brzeźnica	בזשעזשניצע*	Bzhezhnitze		Town survived.
Brzozów	ברעזשאָװ	Brezhov		Town survived, but most Jews were exterminated.
Bukowsko	בוקאָװסק	Bukovsk		Town survived, but all Jews were exterminated. The town was then destroyed during the post-war period and rebuilt years later.
Bytom				City survived.
Chełm	כעלם	Khelm		City survived, but all Jews were exterminated.
Chęciny	חענטשין	Chentshin	2,825 (1921)	Town survived, but all Jews were exterminated.
Chmielnik	כמעלניק	Khmelnik	9,600+ (1939)	Town survived, but nearly all Jews were exterminated.
Ciechanów	טשעכאַנאָװ	Tshekanov		City survived, but nearly all Jews were exterminated.
Czeladź	טשעלאַדזש	Tsheladzh		Town survived, but nearly all Jews were exterminated.
Częstochowa	טשענסטאָכאָװ	Tshenstokhov	~45,000 (1941)	City survived, but made Judenfrei.
Czyżew	טשיזשעװע	Tshizheve		Town survived.
Dąbrowa Górnicza	דאַמבראָװע גורניטשע	Dambrove Gurnitshe		City survived.
Dąbrowa Tarnowska	באָמבראָװ	Dombrov		Town survived.
Dębica	דעמביץ	Dembitz		Town survived.
Dukla	דיקלע	Dikle		Town survived, but many Jews were exterminated.
Dynów	דינאָװ	Dinov	~1,274 (1921)	Town survived.
Działoszyn	זאָלאָשין	Zoloshin		Town survived.
Frysztak	פֿריסטיק	Fristik		Town survived, but nearly all Jews were exterminated.
Gąbin	גאָמבין	Gombin	2,564 (1921)	Town survived, but nearly all Jews were exterminated.
Głogów Małopolski	גלאָגעװ	Glogev		Town survived.
Głowaczów	גלאָגעװ	Glogev		Town survived, but all Jews were exterminated.
Głowno	גלאָװנע	Glovne		Town survived.
Gorlice	גאָרליצע	Gorlitze	5,000 (1939)	City survived, but most Jews were exterminated.
Gostynin	גאָסטינין	Gostinin		Town survived, but most Jews were exterminated.
Góra Kalwaria	גער	Ger		Town survived, but most Jews were exterminated.
Grębów	גרעמבאָװ*	Grembov		Town survived.
Grodzisk Mazowiecki	גראָדזשיסק	Grodzhisk		Town survived, but all Jews were exterminated.
Hrubieszów	הרוביעשאָװ	Hrubyeshov	5,679 (1921)	Town survived, but nearly all Jews were exterminated.
Iłża	דרילטש*	Driltsh		Town survived, but nearly Jews were exterminated.
Inowłódz				Town survived.
Iwaniska	ייִװאַנצק	Yivantzk		Town survived, but most Jews were exterminated.
Jadów	יאַדאָװ	Yadov		Town survived, but most Jews were exterminated.
Janów Podlaski	יאַנעװע	Yaneve		Town survived.
Jarosław	יארעסלאװ	Yareslav		Town survived.
Jasło	יאַסלע	Yasle		Town was razed and all Jews were exterminated. Rebuilt years later.
Jedwabne	יעדװאבנע	Yedvabne	250 (1940)	Town survived, but nearly all Jews were exterminated. See Jedwabne pogrom.
Kamieńsk	קאַמענסק	Kamensk	1,163 (1917)	Town survived, but nearly all Jews were exterminated.
Kańczuga	קאַנטשיק	Kantshik		Town survived.
Kielce	קעלץ	Keltz	25,400 (1940)	City survived, but nearly all Jews were exterminated. See Kielce pogrom.
Kiernozia	קערניזע	Kernize		Town survived.
Kleczew	קלעטשעװע	Kletsheve		Town survived.
Klimontów	קלעמענטאָװ	Klementov		Town survived, but nearly all Jews were exterminated.
Knyszyn	קנישין	Knishin		City survived.
Kock	קאָצק	Kotzk	2,200 (1939)	Town survived, but all Jews were exterminated.
Kolbuszowa	קאלבושאב	Kolbushov		Town was destroyed and nearly all Jews were exterminated. Rebuilt years later.
Kolno	קאָלנע	Kolne		Town survived, but nearly all Jews were exterminated.
Konin	קנין	Knin	6,000 (1939)	City survived, but nearly all Jews were exterminated.
Konstantynów Łódzki	קאָסניטין	Konsnitin		Town survived.
Korczyna	קארטשין	Kortshin		Town survived, but nearly all Jews were exterminated.
Kozienice	קאָזניץ	Kozhnitz	5,000 (1939)	Town survived, but nearly all Jews were exterminated.
Krasnosielc	סילץ	Siltz		Town survived, but nearly all Jews were exterminated.
Krosno	קראָסנע	Krosne		Town survived.
Lelów	לעלאָװ	Lelov		Town was razed, later rebuilt.
Leżajsk	ליזשענסק	Lizhensk	4,500 (1939)	Town survived, but nearly all Jews were exterminated.
Lipsk nad Biebrza	ליפּסק	Lipsk		Town survived.
Lubaczów	ליבעטשוװ	Libetshuv		Town survived.
Łańcut	לאנצוט	Lantzut	2,750 (1939)	Town survived.
Łask	לאָסק	Losk		Town survived.
Łomża	לאָמזשע	Lomzhe		City survived, but nearly all Jews were exterminated.
Łosice	לאָשיץ	Loshitz	6,800 (1942)	Town survived, but nearly all Jews were exterminated.
Majdan Królewski	מאַידאַן*	Maidan		Town survived.
Międzyrzec Podlaski	מעזריטש	Mezritsh	~12,000 (1939)	City survived, but nearly all Jews were exterminated.
Mielec	מעליץ	Melitz	2,800 (1939)	City survived, but nearly all Jews were exterminated.
Mińsk Mazowiecki	נאָװאָ־מינסק	Novo-Minsk		Town survived, but all Jews were exterminated.
Mława	מלאװע	Mlave		Town survived, but nearly all Jews were exterminated.
Mstów	אָמסטאָװ	Omstov		Town survived.
Mszczonów	אמשינאָװ	Amshinov		Town survived.
Niebylec	נעבליץ*	Nebelitz		Town survived, but nearly all Jews were exterminated.
Nowy Dwór Mazowiecki	נאָװידװאָר	Novidvor	9,000+ (1939)	Town survived.
Nowy Korczyn	נײַשטאָט	Nayshtot		Town survived, but nearly all Jews were exterminated.
Nowy Sącz	צאנז	Tzanz		City survived, but nearly all Jews were exterminated.
Nowy Żmigród	זמיגראָד	Zhmigrod	2,000 (1942)	Town survived, but all Jews were exterminated.
Nur	נור*	Nur		Town survived.
Olkusz	עלקיש	Elkish		Town survived.
Opatów	אפטא	Apta	5,000 (1939)	Town survived, but nearly all Jews were exterminated.
Opoczno	אפאטשנא	Opotshna		Town survived, but nearly all Jews were exterminated.
Osjaków	שאקעװ	Shakev		Town survived.
Ostrołęka	אסטראלענקע	Ostrolenke		City survived.
Ostrów Mazowiecka	אָסטרעװע	Ostreve	10,471 (1897)	Town survived.
Ostrowiec Świętokrzyski	אסטראװצע	Ostrovtze	~10,000 (1943)	Town survived, but most Jews were exterminated.
Ożarów	אָזשאראָװ	Ozharov		Town survived.
Pabianice	פּאביאניץ	Pabyanitz	9,000 (1939)	Town survived.
Pilica	פילץ	Piltz	1,877 (1921)	Town survived, but all Jews were exterminated.
Pilzno	פּילזנע	Pilzne		Town survived.
Piotrków Trybunalski	פעטריקעװ	Petrikev	25,000 (1938)	City survived.
Płock	פלוצק	Plutzk		City survived.
Połaniec	פּלאַנטש	Plantsh		Town survived, but all Jews were exterminated.
Przemyśl	פּשעמישל	Pshemishl		City survived.
Przeworsk	פּרשעװאָרסק	Prshevorsk		Town survived, but nearly all Jews were exterminated.
Radom	ראָדעם	Rodem	11,200 (1897)	City survived.
Radomsko	ראַדאָמסק	Radomsk		Town survived, but made Judenfrei.
Radomyśl Wielki	גרױס־ראַדאָמישל	Groys-Radomishl		Town was destroyed and rebuilt years later.
Radziłów	(ע)ראַדזשילעװ	Radzhilev(e)	500 (1940)	Town survived, but nearly all Jews were exterminated. See Radziłów pogrom.
Radzyń Podlaski	ראדזין	Rodzin		Town survived, but all Jews were exterminated.
Raniżów	ראניזאװ	Ranizov		Town survived.
Ropczyce	ראָפשיץ	Ropshitz	1,000 (1939)	Town survived.
Różan	ראָזשאַן*	Rozhan	1,800 (1939)	The town was destroyed and rebuilt years later.
Rozwadów	ראָזװעדאָװ	Rozvedov		The town was destroyed and rebuilt years later.
Rymanów	רימענעװ	Rimenev		Town survived, but nearly all Jews were exterminated.
Rzeszów	רײשע	Reyshe	14,000 (1939)	City survived, but nearly all Jews were exterminated.
Sanniki			300 (1939)	Town survived.
Sandomierz	צױזמיר	Tzoyzmir		Town survived.
Sanok	סאָניק	Sonik		Town survived.
Sędziszów Małopolski	שענדישעװ	Shendishev		Town survived, but all Jews were exterminated.
Sejny	סײני	Seini	399 (1921)	Town survived, but nearly all Jews were exterminated.
Sławków	סלאַװקעװ	Slavkev		Town survived.
Sochocin	סאָכעטשין*	Sochetshin		Town survived.
Sokołów Małopolski	סאקאלאװ*	Sokolov	1,600 (1939)	Town survived.
Sokołów Podlaski	סוקולוב	Sokolov	6,000 (1939)	Town survived, but nearly all Jews were exterminated.
Sompolno	סאַמפּאָלנע	Sampolne		Town survived.
Sosnowiec	סאָסנאָװיץ	Sosnovitz		City survived.
Staszów	סטאַשעװ	Stashev		Town survived.
Strzyżów	סטריזשעװ	Strizhev		Town survived.
Supraśl	סופּראַסליע	Surpasliv		Town survived.
Suwałki	סװאלק	Svalk	7,000 (1939)	City survived, but nearly all Jews were exterminated.
Szczebrzeszyn	שעברעשין	Shebreshin		City survived, but nearly all Jews were exterminated.
Szczerców	שטערצעװ	Shtertzev		Town was destroyed and rebuilt years later.
Szczuczyn	שצוצין	Shtzutzin	~2,522 (1939)	Town survived, but nearly all Jews were exterminated. See Szczuczyn pogrom.
Tarnobrzeg	דזשיקאװ	Dzhikov		City survived.
Tarnogród	טאַרניגראָד	Tarnigrod		Town survived, but nearly all Jews were exterminated.
Tarnów	טארנע	Tarne	25,000 (1939)	City survived, but nearly all Jews were exterminated.
Tyrawa Wołoska	טערעװע	Tereve		Town survived.
Tomaszów Mazowiecki	טאָמעשעװ	Tomeshev		Town survived.
Trzcianne	טרעסטיני	Trestini	2,500 (1939)	Town survived, but nearly all Jews were exterminated.
Tyczyn	טיטשין	Titshin	2,000 (1939)	Town survived, but nearly all Jews were exterminated.
Tykocin	טיקטין	Tiktin		Town survived, but all Jews were exterminated.
Ulanów	אילענעװ	Ilenev		Town survived, but all Jews were exterminated.
Warta	דװארט	Dvart		Town survived.
Wielkie Oczy	װילקאָטש	Vilkotsh		Town survived, but all Jews were exterminated.
Włoszczowa	װלאטשעװע*	Vlotsheve		Town survived, but nearly all Jews were exterminated.
Wojsławice	װאיסלאװיץ	Voyslavits		Town survived.
Wysokie Mazowieckie	װיסאקע-מאזאװיעצק	Visoke-Mazovietzk		Town survived.
Wyszogród	װישאגראד	Vishogrod		Town survived.
Zabłudów	זאבלודאָװע	Zabludove		Town survived, but nearly all Jews were exterminated.
Zaklików	זאקלקעװ	Zaklkev		Town survived.
Zakroczym	זאקראָטשין	Zakrotshin		Town survived.
Zambrów	זעמבראװע	Zembrove		Town survived.
Zduńska Wola	זדינסקע־װאָליע	Zdinske-Volye		Town survived.
Zelów	זלאװ*	Zlav	2,000 (1939)	Town survived.
Zgierz	זגערזש	Zgerzh		Town survived, but nearly all Jews were exterminated.
Żołynia	זשעלין	Zhelin		Town survived.
Żabno	זשאבנא	Zhabno		Town survived, but all Jews were exterminated.

=== Ukraine ===
Town	Yiddish Name		Pre-Holocaust Jewish population	Notes
Town	Yiddish	Latin	Pre-Holocaust Jewish population	Notes
Ananiv	אנאניעװ	Ananyev		City survived.
Bibrka	בוברקא	Bubrka	2,000 (1941)	City survived.
Belz	בעלז	Belz	3,600 (1914)	City survived.
Berdychiv	בארדיטשעװ	Barditshev	41,617 (1897)	City survived, but nearly all Jews were exterminated.
Berehove	בערעגסאז	Beregsaz		City survived.
Berezdiv	בערעזדיװ	Berezdiv		Town survived.
Berezhany	ברעזשאן	Brezhan	~8,000 (1939)	City survived, but nearly all Jews were exterminated.
Bila Tserkva	שװאַרץ־טומאה	Shvartz-Tumah		City survived, but nearly all Jews were exterminated. See Bila Tserkva massacre.
Boiany	בױאן	Boyan		Town survived.
Bolekhiv	באָלעכאָװ	Bolekhov	~3,000 (1940)	City survived, but nearly all Jews were exterminated..
Boryslav	באָריסלאװ	Borislav		City survived.
Borzna	באָרזנע	Borzne		Town survived.
Brody	בראָד	Brod	~9,000 (1941)	City survived, but nearly all Jews were exterminated.
Bratslav	בראָסלעװ	Broslev		Town survived.
Buchach	ביטשאָטש	Bitshotsh		City survived, but made Judenfrei.
Budaniv	בודזאנאװ	Budzanov		Town survived, but nearly all Jews were exterminated.
Bukachivtsi	בוקיטשעװיץ	Bukitshevitz		Town survived, but nearly all Jews were exterminated.
Burshtyn	בורשטין	Burshtin	1,700 (1942)	City survived, but nearly all Jews were exterminated.
Chernihiv	טשערניִעװ	Tsherniev	11,000 (1897)	City survived.
Chopovychi	טשאָפּאָװיטש*	Tshopovitsh		Town survived.
Chornobyl	טשערנאָבל	Tshernobl		City survived, but all Jews were exterminated.
Chortkiv	טשאָרטקאָװ	Tshortkov		City survived.
Deliatyn	דעלאטין	Delatin		Town survived, but nearly all Jews were exterminated.
Derazhnia	דעראזשניע*	Derazhnie		City survived, but all Jews were exterminated.
Dolyna	דאָלינא	Dolina		City survived, but all Jews were exterminated.
Drohobych	דראָהאָביטש	Drohobitsh	15,000 (1939)	City survived, but nearly all Jews were exterminated.
Dunaivtsi	דינעװיץ	Dinevitz		City survived.
Hornostaipil	הורנסטײפל	Hornsteypl		Town survived.
Horodenka	האָראָדענקע	Horodenke		City survived.
Horodok	גרײַדינג	Greiding	~5,000 (1941)	City survived, but nearly all Jews were exterminated.
Husiatyn	הוסיאטין	Husyatin		Town survived, but nearly all Jews were exterminated.
Justingrad	יוסטינגראָד	Yustingrod		Town was destroyed and nearly all Jews were exterminated.
Kalush	קאַלעש	Kalesh		City survived, but nearly all Jews were exterminated.
Kalynivka	קאַלענעװקע	Kalenevke		Town survived.
Kamianets-Podilskyi	קאמענעץ־פאָדאָלסק	Kamenetz-Podolsk		City survived. See Kamianets-Podilskyi massacre.
Khorostkiv	כראָסקעװ	Khroskev		City (then-town) survived.
Khotyn	חוטין	Chutin		City survived.
Kolky	קאָלק	Kolk		City survived.
Kolomyia	קאָלאָמײ	Kolomey	16,568 (1900)	City survived, but nearly all Jews were exterminated.
Korolevo	קיראַלהאַז	Kiralhaz		City survived.
Kopychyntsi	קאָפיטשיניץ	Kopitshinitz		City survived.
Kosiv	קאָסאָװ	Kosov	3,700 (1939)	City survived, but nearly all Jews were exterminated.
Kovel	קאָװעל	Kovel		City survived.
Kremenets	קרעמעניץ	Kremenitz	15,000+ (1941)	City survived, but nearly all Jews were exterminated.
Krasnostav				Town destroyed.
Kupil	קופּעל	Kupel		Town survived, but all Jews were exterminated.
Kuty	קיטעװ	Kitev		City survived, but nearly all Jews were exterminated.
Letychiv	לעטיטשעװ	Letitshev		Town survived, but nearly all Jews were exterminated.
Lityn	ליטין	Litin		Town survived, but nearly all Jews were exterminated.
Liubar	לובער	Luber		City survived.
Lozisht	לאָזשיסט	Lozhist		Town was destroyed and all Jews were exterminated.
Lutsk	לוצק	Lutzk	17,500 (1939)	City survived, but all Jews were exterminated.
Makariv	מעקאַרעװ	Mekarev		City survived, but nearly all Jews were exterminated.
Makhnivka	מאַכניװקאַ	Makhnivka	843 (1939)	Town survived, but nearly all Jews were exterminated.
Mariiampil	מאַריאַמפּאָל	Mariampol		Town survived, but all Jews were exterminated.
Medzhybizh	מעזשביזש	Mezhbizh		City survived, but all Jews were exterminated.
Mlyniv	מלינוב	Mlinuv	About 2000	City survived.
Mukachevo	מונקאטש	Munkatsh	15,000 (1944)	City survived, but nearly all Jews were exterminated.
Nadvirna	נאדװאָרנא	Nadvorna	2,042 (1921)	City survived, but nearly all Jews were exterminated.
Nemyriv	נעמאַרעװ	Nemarev		Town survived, but nearly all Jews were exterminated.
Nova Ushytsia	נײַ־אושיצע	Nay Ushitze	1,547 (1939)	Town survived, but nearly all Jews were exterminated.
Nizhyn	ניעזשין	Niezhin		City survived.
Olesko	אָלעקס	Oleks	738 (1935)	City survived.
Olyka	אָליק	Olik	2,086 (1921)	City survived, but all Jews were exterminated.
Otyniia	אָטיניא	Otinya		City survived.
Pavoloch	פאװאָליטש	Pavolitsh		Town survived, but all Jews were exterminated. See Pavoloch massacre.
Pidhaitsi	פּידײַיִץ	Pidayitz	2,827 (1931)	City survived, but nearly all Jews were exterminated.
Pidkamin	פּאדקאמען*	Podkamen		City survived, but nearly all Jews were exterminated.
Plyskiv	פּליסקעװ	Pliskev		Town survived, but nearly all Jews were exterminated.
Pohrebyshche	פּאָרעבישטש	Porebishtsh		City survived.
Polonne	פאָלאָנע	Polone		City survived.
Poninka	פּאנינקע*	Poninke		City survived.
Probizhna	פראָבוזנא	Probuzna		Town survived.
Pryluky	פּרילוק	Priluk		City survived, but nearly all Jews were exterminated.
Rava-Ruska	ראװע	Rave		City survived.
Rohatyn	רוהאטין	Ruhatin		City survived, but nearly all Jews were exterminated.
Rivne	ראװנע	Ravne		City survived, but nearly all Jews were exterminated.
Ruzhyn	ריזשן	Rizhn	1,108 (1939)	City survived, but nearly all Jews were exterminated.
Sadhora	סאדיגאָרא	Sadigora	5,000 (1914)	Town survived.
Sambir	סאמבאָר	Sambor		City survived.
Savran	סאװראן*	Savran	3,198 (1900)	City survived, but nearly all Jews were exterminated.
Seliatyn				Town survived.
Sharhorod	שריגרוד	Shrigrud		City survived.
Shepetivka	שעפעטיוקע	Shepetivke		City survived.
Shpola	שפאָלע	Shpole		City survived, but nearly all Jews were exterminated.
Shpykiv	שפּיקעװ	Shpikev		City survived.
Skala-Podilska	סקאַלע	Skale		City survived.
Skalat	סקאלאט	Skalat		Town survived.
Slavuta	סלאװיטא	Slovita		City survived.
Sniatyn	שניאטין*	Shnyatin		Town survived, but nearly all Jews were exterminated.
Sosnove	סלוטש-גדול	Slutsh-Gadol		City survived.
Stara Syniava	אַלט־סיניאָװע	Alt-Siniove		City survived.
Starokostiantyniv	אַלט־קאָסנטין	Alt-Kosntin	6,743 (1939)	City survived, but all Jews were exterminated.
Stepan	סטעפּיען	Stepyen	1,854 (1900)	City survived, but all Jews were exterminated.
Storozhynets	שטראזשניץ	Shtrozhnitz	2,480 (1930)	City survived.
Stryi	סטרי	Stri	11,000 (1939)	City survived, but nearly all Jews were exterminated.
Tarashcha	טאַראַשטשע	Tarashtshe		City survived.
Teofipol	טשאן	Tshan		City survived.
Terebovlia	טרעבעװלע	Trebevle		City survived.
Tetiiv	טיטיעװ	Tityev		City survived.
Tlumach	טאלמיטש	Tolmitsh		City survived, but nearly all Jews were exterminated.
Tovste	טױסט	Toyst		City survived.
Trochenbrod				Town survived, but nearly all Jews were exterminated.
Trostianets	טראָסטיניץ	Trostinitz		City survived.
Ulashkivtsi	לאַשקעװיץ	Lashkevitz		Town survived.
Uman	אומאן	Uman		City survived, but all Jews were exterminated.
Uzhhorod	אונגװיר	Ungvir		City survived, but nearly all Jews were exterminated.
Voinyliv				City survived.
Volochysk	װאָלאָטשיסק	Volotshisk		City survived.
Vyshnivets	װישניפֿיץ	Vishnifitz		City survived, but nearly all Jews were exterminated.
Vyzhnytsia	װיזשניץ	Vizhnitz		Town survived.
Yampil	יאמפאלא	Yampol	1,495 (1939)	Town survived, but nearly all Jews were exterminated.
Yavoriv	יאַװאָראָװ	Yavorov		City survived, but nearly all Jews were exterminated.
Yabluniv	יאַבלאָנעװ	Yablonev		City survived, but nearly all Jews were exterminated.
Yahilnytsia	ייִגאָלניצע	Yigolnitze		Town survived.
Yazlovets	יאַזלאָװיץ	Yazlovitz		Town survived, but nearly all Jews were exterminated.
Zabolotiv	זאַבלאָטאָװ	Zablotov		City survived.
Zalishchyky	זאַלישטשיק	Zalishtshik		City survived.
Zbarazh	זבאראזש	Zbarazh		City survived, but nearly all Jews were exterminated.
Zhmerynka	זשמערינקע	Zhmerinke		City survived.
Zhovkva	זשאָלקװע	Zholkve		Town survived, but nearly all Jews were exterminated.
Zhydachiv	זשידעטשױװ	Zhidetshoiv	950 (1929)	City survived, but nearly all Jews were exterminated.
Zinkiv	זענקעװ	Zenkev		City survived.
Zlatopil	זלאַטאָפּאָליע	Zlatopolye		City survived, but nearly all Jews were exterminated.
Zolochiv	זלאָטשעװ	Zlotshev		City survived, but nearly all Jews were exterminated.
Zolotyi Potik	פּאָטיק	Potik	895 (1921)	Town survived, but all Jews were deported and/or exterminated.

=== Others ===
Current country	Town	Yiddish name		Pre-Holocaust Jewish population	Notes
Current country	Town	Hebrew	Latin	Pre-Holocaust Jewish population	Notes
Hungary	Sátoraljaújhely	איהעל	Ihel	4,500 (1905)	
Latvia	Riebiņi	ריבינישאָק	Ribinishok	533 (1897)	
Latvia	Višķi	װישקי	Vishki		
Moldova	Căușeni	קאַושאַן	Kaushan	1,675 (1897)	
Moldova	Zgurița	זגוריצה	Zguritza	1,802 (1897)	
Romania	Gura Humorului	גוראַ הומאָראַ	Gura Humora		
Romania	Rădăuți	ראַדעװיץ	Radevitz		
Russia	Khislavichi	חאסלאװיץ	Khoslovitz	3,642 (1880)	
Russia	Lyubavichi	ליובאַװיתש	Lyubavitsh	967 (1926)	Town survived, but all Jews were exterminated.
Slovakia	Bardejov	באַרדיאָב	Bardyov		

== Shtots ==
Current country	City	Yiddish name		Pre–Holocaust Jewish population	Notes
Current country	City	Hebrew	Latin	Pre–Holocaust Jewish population	Notes
Austria	Vienna	װין	Vin	166,000	Compare the German endonym 'Wien'
Belarus	Bobruisk	באַברױסק	Babruisk	21,558	
Belarus	Brest	בריסק	Brisk	30,000	
Belarus	Minsk	מינסק	Minsk	90,000	
Belarus	Pinsk	פינסק	Pinsk	20,200	
Belarus	Vitebsk	װיטעבסק	Vitebsk	34,400	
Czechia	Prague	פּראָג	Prog	56,000	
Germany	Frankfurt	פֿראַנקפורט	Frankfurt	26,158	
Hungary	Budapest	בודאַפעשט	Budapesht	184,000	
Latvia	Daugavpils	דװינסק	Dvinsk	11,106	Named "Dvinsk" from 1893 till 1920
Latvia	Riga	ריגע	Rige	43,672	
Lithuania	Kaunas	קאָװנע	Kovne	38,000	Compare the Polish name "Kowno"
Lithuania	Vilnius	װילנע	Vilne	55,000	
Moldova	Bălți	בלץ	Beltz	14,229	
Moldova	Chişinău	קישינעװ	Kishinev	70,000	Compare the Russian name "Kishinov"
Poland	Białystok	ביאַליסטאָק	Byalistok	40,000	
Poland	Gdańsk	דאַנציג	Dantzig		Compare the German name "Danzig"
Poland	Kraków	קראָקע	Kroke	60,000	
Poland	Łódź	לאָדזש	Lodzh	223,000- 163,177	
Poland	Lublin	לובלין	Lublin	40,000	
Poland	Poznań	פּױזן	Poyzn		Compare the German name "Posen"
Poland	Warsaw	װאַרשע	Varshe	400,000	
Poland	Wrocław	ברעסלױ	Bresloy	10,309	Compare the German name "Breslau"
Romania	Bucharest	בוקאַרעשט	Bukaresht	100,000	
Romania	Cluj-Napoca	קלױזענבורג	Kloyzenburg	16,763	Compare the German name "Klausenburg"
Romania	Iaşi	יאַס	Yas	51,000	
Russia	Kaliningrad	קעניגסבערג	Kenigsberg	5,500	Compare former German name Königsberg
Russia	Moscow	מאָסקװע	Moskve	250,000	
Russia	Saint Petersburg	פעטערבורג/לענינגראַד	Peterburg/Leningrad	200,000	Named "Leningrad" in 1924-1991
Russia	Smolensk	סמאָלענסק	Smolensk	3,000	
Slovakia	Bratislava	פרעסבורג	Presburg	14,882	Compare the German name "Preßburg"
Ukraine	Chernivtsi	טשערנאָװיץ	Tshernovitz	50,000	
Ukraine	Dnipropetrovsk	קאַטערינעסלאַװ	Katerineslav	100,000	Named Катериносла́в (Katerynosláv) until 1929
Ukraine	Ivano-Frankivsk	סטאַניסלאװ	Stanislav	30,000	Named "Stanisławów" until 1962
Ukraine	Kyiv	קיִעװ	Kiev	175,000	
Ukraine	Kharkiv	כֿאַרקעװ	Kharkev	130,200	
Ukraine	Khmelnytskyi	פּראָסקערעװ	Proskerev	13,500	Named Проску́рів (Proskúriv) until 1954
Ukraine	Lviv	לעמבערג	Lemberg	150,000	Compare the German name "Lemberg"
Ukraine	Odessa	אַדעס	Ades	180,000	
Ukraine	Ternopil	טאַרנעפּאָל	Tarnepol	18,000	
Ukraine	Vinnitsa	װיניצע	Vinitze	21,812	
Ukraine	Zhytomyr	זשיטאָמיר	Zhitomir	30,000	

== See also ==
- List of villages and towns depopulated of Jews during the Holocaust
- Where Once We Walked
