= Holocaust survivors =

People who survived the Holocaust

Survivors of the Holocaust lived through an attempted racial annihilation of Europe's Jews by Nazi Germany and its collaborators before and during World War II in Europe and North Africa. While there is no single official definition, the term generally includes Jews who lived under Axis rule, those who fled to neutral or Allied nations, and sometimes non-Jewish groups—like the Roma—who faced similar systematic persecution. Over time, the definition has expanded to be more inclusive of various experiences of displacement and survival.

Most Holocaust survivors live in Israel and the United States as well as other minorities in France, United Kingdom, Canada and Eastern Europe.

Survivors of the Holocaust include those persecuted civilians who were still alive in the concentration camps when they were liberated at the end of the war, or those who had either survived as partisans or had been hidden with the assistance of non-Jews, or had escaped to territories beyond the control of the Nazis before the Final Solution was implemented.

At the end of the war, the immediate issues faced by Holocaust survivors were physical and emotional recovery from the starvation, abuse, and suffering that they had experienced; the need to search for their relatives and reunite with them if any of them were still alive; rebuild their lives by returning to their former homes, or more often, by immigrating to new and safer locations because their homes and communities had been destroyed or because they were endangered by renewed acts of antisemitic violence, which until this day can still be felt in many European countries.

After the initial and immediate needs of Holocaust survivors were addressed, additional issues came to the forefront. Examples of such included social welfare and psychological care, reparations and restitution for the persecution, slave labor and property losses which they had suffered, the restoration of looted books, works of art and other stolen property to their rightful owners, the collection of witness and survivor testimonies, the memorialization of murdered family members and destroyed communities, and care for disabled and aging survivors, to name just a few.

== Definition ==
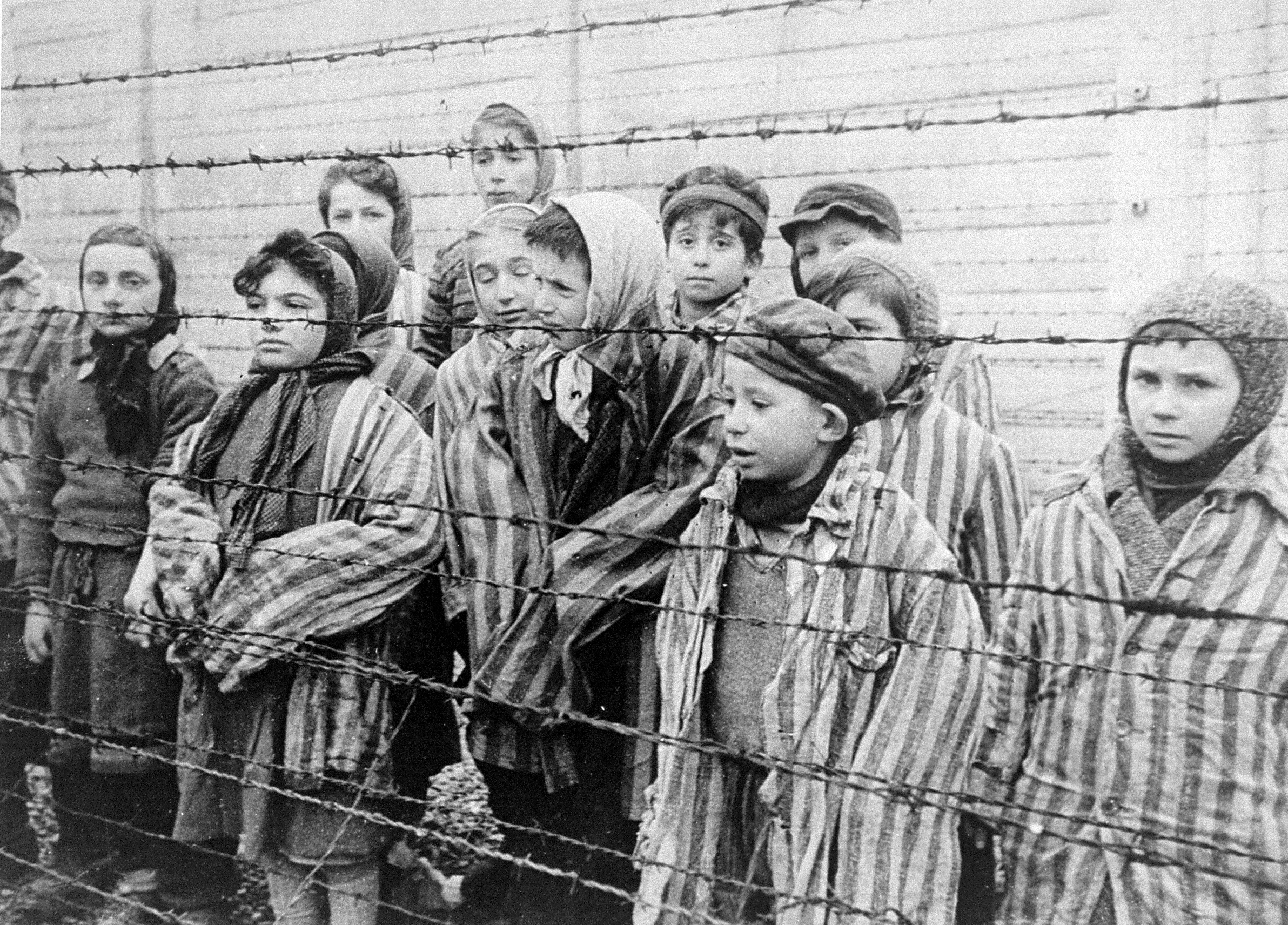
Children at Auschwitz concentration camp at the time of its liberation by Soviet forces

The term "Holocaust survivor" applies to people who lived through the mass exterminations which were carried out by the Nazis. However, the term can also be applied to those who did not come under the direct control of the Nazi regime in Germany or occupied Europe, but were substantially affected by it, such as Jews who fled Germany or their homelands in order to escape the Nazis, and never lived in a Nazi-controlled country after Adolf Hitler came to power but lived in it before the Nazis put the "Final Solution" into effect, or others who were not persecuted by the Nazis themselves, but were persecuted by their allies or collaborators both in Nazi satellite countries and occupied countries.

Yad Vashem, the State of Israel's official memorial to the victims of the Holocaust, defines Holocaust survivors as Jews who lived under Nazi control, whether it was direct or indirect, for any amount of time, and survived it. This definition includes Jews who spent the entire war living under Nazi collaborationist regimes, including France, Bulgaria and Romania, but were not deported, as well as Jews who fled or were forced to leave Germany in the 1930s. Additionally, other Jewish refugees are considered Holocaust survivors, including those who fled their home countries in Eastern Europe to evade the invading German army and spent years living in the Soviet Union.

The United States Holocaust Memorial Museum gives a broader definition of Holocaust survivors: "The Museum honors any persons as survivors, Jewish or non-Jewish, who were displaced, persecuted, or discriminated against due to the racial, religious, ethnic, social, and political policies of the Nazis and their collaborators between 1933 and 1945. In addition to former inmates of concentration camps, ghettos, and prisons, this definition includes, among others, people who lived as refugees or people who lived in hiding."

In the later years of the twentieth century, as public awareness of the Holocaust evolved, other groups who had previously been overlooked or marginalized as survivors began to share their testimonies with memorial projects and seek restitution for their experiences. One such group consisted of Sinti (Gypsy) survivors of Nazi persecution who went on a hunger strike at Dachau, Germany, in 1980 in order to draw attention to their situation and demand moral rehabilitation for their suffering during the Holocaust, and West Germany formally recognized the genocide of the Roma in 1982. Another group that has been defined as Holocaust survivors consists of "flight survivors", that is, refugees who fled eastward into Soviet-controlled areas from the start of the war, or people who were deported to various parts of the Soviet Union by the NKVD.

The growing awareness of additional categories of survivors has prompted a broadening of the definition of Holocaust survivors by institutions such as the Claims Conference, Yad Vashem and the United States Holocaust Memorial Museum so it can include flight survivors and others who were previously excluded from restitution and recognition, such as those who lived in hiding during the war, including children who were hidden in order to protect them from the Nazis.

== Numbers of survivors ==
At the start of World War II in September 1939, about 9.5 million Jews lived in the European countries that were either already under the control of Nazi Germany or would be invaded or conquered, either willingly or by force during the war. Over two-thirds of these European Jews, or around 6 million people, were murdered by Germany and Romania, including over 600,000 Jewish children born during the war, so that by the end of the war in Europe in May 1945, about 3.5 million of them had survived. As of January 2026, about 196,600 survivors were alive.

Those who managed to stay alive until the end of the war and massacre, under varying circumstances, comprise the following:

=== Concentration camp prisoners ===
Between 250,000 and 300,000 Jews withstood the concentration camps and death marches, although tens of thousands of them were so weak or sick that even with post-liberation medical care, they died within a few months of liberation.

=== Other survivors ===
Other Jews throughout Europe survived because the Germans and their collaborators did not manage to complete the deportations and mass-murder before Allied forces arrived, or the collaborationist regimes were overthrown before the Final Solution could be carried out. Thus, for example, in Western Europe, around three-quarters of the pre-war Jewish population survived the Holocausts in France and Italy, about half survived in Belgium, while only a quarter of the pre-war Jewish population survived in the Netherlands. Around a third of Austrian Jews and 70% of German Jews who did not flee those countries by 1939 were killed. In eastern and south-eastern Europe, most of Bulgaria's Jews survived the war, as well as 60% of Jews in Romania and nearly 30% of the Jewish population in Hungary. Two-thirds survived in the Soviet Union. Bohemia, Slovakia and Yugoslavia lost about 80% of their Jewish populations. In Poland, the Baltic states and Greece close to 90% of Jews were murdered by the Nazis and their local collaborators.

Throughout Europe, a few thousand Jews also survived in hiding, or with false papers posing as Aryans, hidden or assisted by non-Jews who risked their lives to rescue Jews individually or in small groups. Several thousand Jews also survived by hiding in dense forests in Eastern Europe, and as Jewish partisans actively resisting the Nazis as well as protecting other escapees, and, in some instances, working with non-Jewish partisan groups to fight against the German invaders.

=== Refugees ===
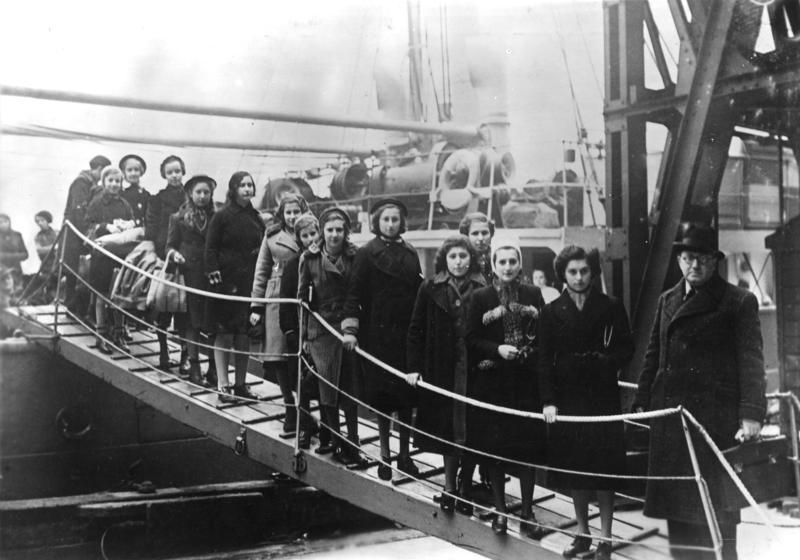
Jewish refugees arriving in London from Nazi Germany and Poland in February 1939

The largest group of survivors consisted of Jews who managed to escape from German-occupied Europe before or during the war. Jews had begun emigrating from Germany in 1933 once the Nazis came to power, and from Austria from 1938, after the Anschluss. By the time war began in Europe, approximately 282,000 Jews had left Germany, and 117,000 had left Austria.

Only 10 percent of Polish Jews survived the war. The majority of survivors (around 300,000) were those who fled to Soviet-occupied Poland and the interior of the Soviet Union between the start of the war in September 1939 and the German invasion of the Soviet Union in June 1941. The Soviet authorities deported tens of thousands of them to Soviet Central Asia, Siberia and other remote parts of the country. Some deportees endured forced labor, extreme conditions, hunger and disease. Nonetheless, most managed to survive, despite the harsh circumstances.

After the German invasion of the Soviet Union, more than a million Soviet Jews fled eastward into the interior. During the war, some European Jews managed to escape to neutral European countries, such as Switzerland, which allowed in nearly 30,000 but turned away some 20,000 others; Spain, which permitted the entry of almost 30,000 Jewish refugees between 1939 and 1941, mostly from France, on their way to Portugal, but under German pressure allowed in fewer than 7,500 between 1942 and 1944; Portugal, which allowed thousands of Jews to enter so that they could continue their journeys from the port of Lisbon to the United States and South America; and neutral Sweden, which allowed in some Norwegian Jews in 1940, and in October 1943, accepted almost the entire Danish Jewish community, rescued by the Danish resistance movement, which organized the escape of 7,000 Danish Jews and 700 of their non-Jewish relatives in small boats from Denmark to Sweden. About 18,000 Jews escaped by means of clandestine immigration to British Palestine (formally, from central and eastern Europe between 1937 and 1944 on 62 voyages organized by the Mossad l'Aliyah Bet (Organization for Illegal Immigration), which was established by the Jewish leadership in British Palestine in 1938. These voyages were conducted under dangerous conditions during the war, with hundreds of lives lost at sea) .

== Immediate aftermath ==
When the Second World War ended, the Jews who had survived the Nazi concentration camps, extermination camps, death marches, as well as the Jews who had survived by hiding in forests or hiding with rescuers, were almost all suffering from starvation, exhaustion and the abuse which they had endured, and tens of thousands of survivors continued to die from weakness, eating more than their emaciated bodies could handle, epidemic diseases, exhaustion and the shock of liberation. Some survivors returned to their countries of origin while others sought to leave Europe by immigrating to British Palestine or other countries.

=== Trauma of liberation ===
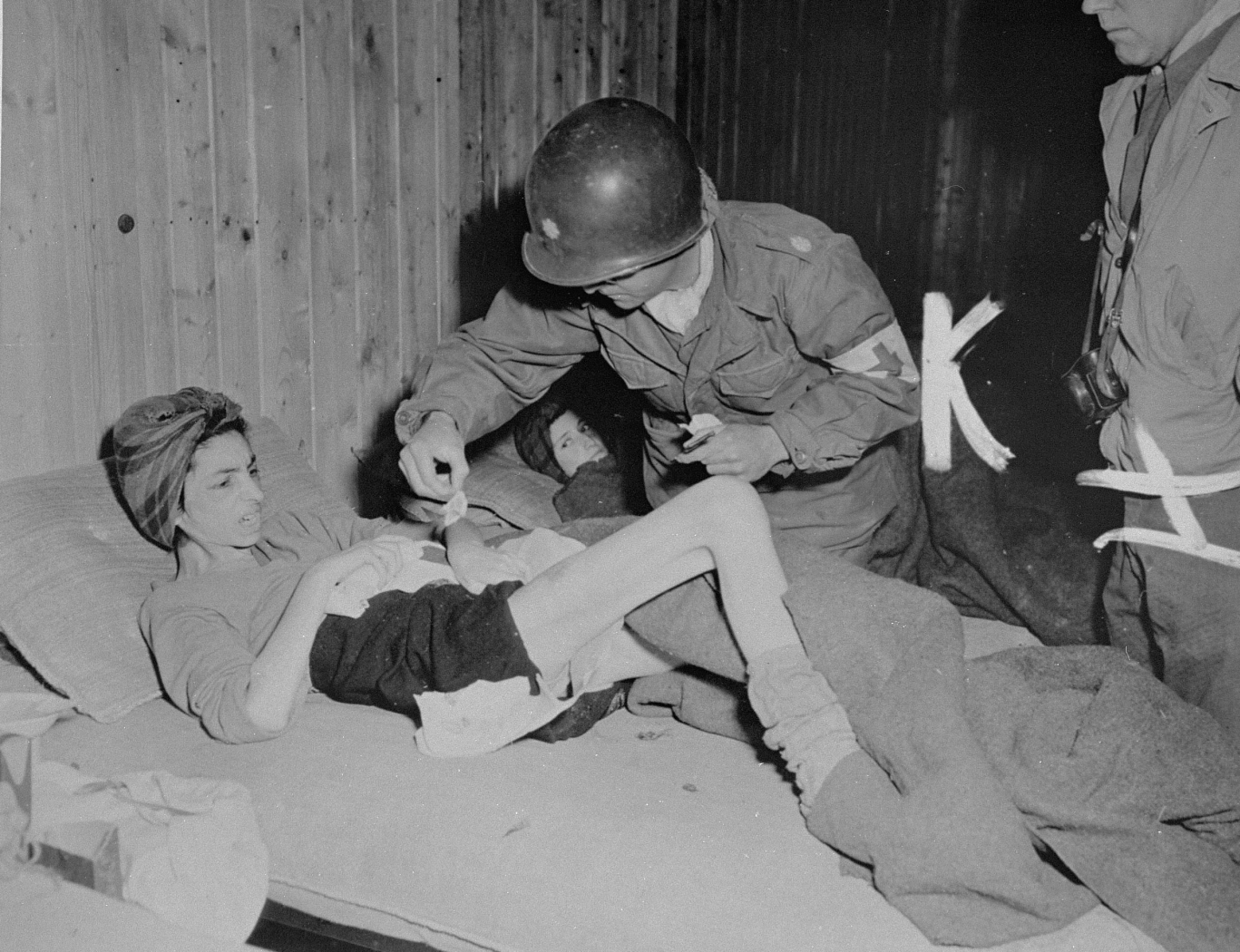
U.S. Army surgeon attends to a survivor in a sub-camp of Buchenwald concentration camp shortly after liberation.

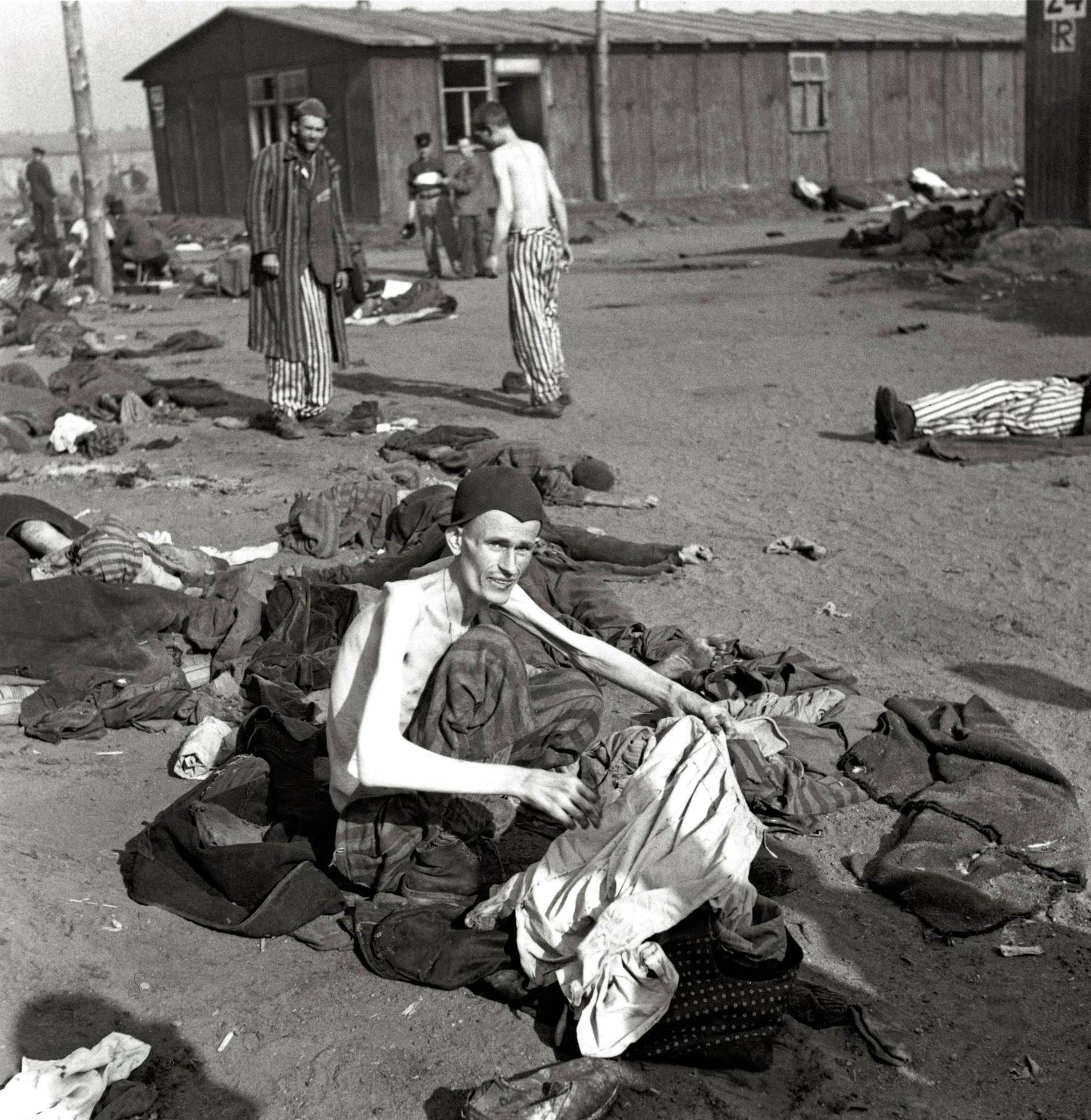
A survivor photographed after the liberation of Bergen-Belsen by the British

For survivors, the end of the war did not bring an end to their suffering. Liberation itself was extremely difficult for many survivors and the transition to freedom from the terror, brutality and starvation they had just endured was frequently traumatic.

As Allied forces fought their way across Europe and captured areas that had been occupied by the Germans, they discovered the Nazi concentration and extermination camps. In some places, the Nazis had tried to destroy all evidence of the camps to conceal the crimes that they had perpetrated there. In other places, the Allies found only empty buildings, as the Nazis had already moved the prisoners, often on death marches, to other locations. However, in many camps, the Allied soldiers found hundreds or even thousands of weak and starving survivors. Soviet forces reached Majdanek concentration camp in July 1944 and soon came across many other sites but often did not publicize what they had found. British and American units on the Western Front did not reach the concentration camps in Germany until the spring of 1945.

When Allied troops entered the death camps, they discovered thousands of Jewish and non-Jewish survivors living in the most terrible conditions, suffering from starvation and disease, many of them dying. The allies also found piles of corpses, bones, and the human ashes of the victims of the Nazi mass murder. The liberators were unprepared for what they found but did their best to help the survivors. Despite this, thousands died in the first weeks after liberation. Many died from disease. Some died from refeeding syndrome since after prolonged starvation their stomachs and bodies could not take normal food. Survivors also had no possessions. At first, they still had to wear their concentration camp uniforms as they had no other clothes to wear.

During the first weeks of liberation, survivors faced the challenges of eating suitable food, in appropriate amounts for their physical conditions; recuperating and rebuilding their health from illnesses, injuries and extreme fatigue; and regaining some sense of mental and social normality. Almost every survivor also had to deal with the loss of many loved ones, many being the only one remaining alive from their entire family, as well as the loss of their homes, former activities or livelihoods, and ways of life.

As survivors faced the daunting challenges of rebuilding their broken lives and finding any remaining family members, the vast majority also found that they needed to find new places to live. Returning to life as it had been before the Holocaust proved to be impossible. At first, following liberation, numerous survivors tried to return to their previous homes and communities, but Jewish communities had been ravaged or destroyed and no longer existed in much of Europe. Returning to their homes frequently proved to be dangerous. When people tried to return to their homes from camps or hiding places, they found that, in many cases, their homes had been looted or taken over by others. Most did not find any surviving relatives, encountered indifference from the local population almost everywhere, and, in Eastern Europe in particular, were met with hostility and sometimes violence.

=== Refugees and displaced persons ===
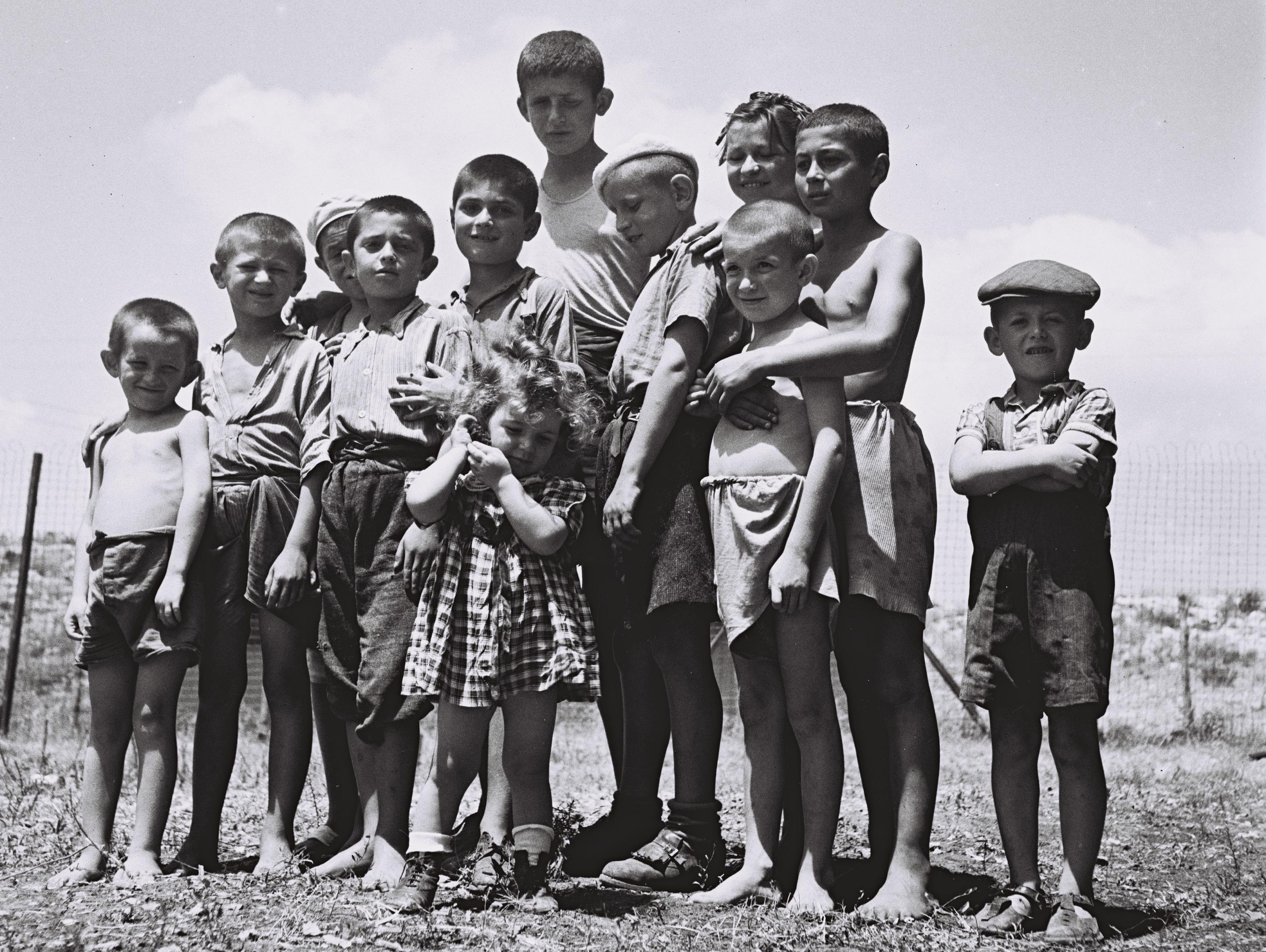
A group of orphaned survivors of the Holocaust, at the Atlit detainee camp, Palestine in 1944

Jewish survivors who could not or did not want to go back to their old homes, particularly those whose entire families had been murdered, whose homes, or neighborhoods or entire communities had been destroyed, or who faced renewed antisemitic violence, became known by the term "Sh'erit ha-Pletah" (Hebrew: the surviving remnant). Most of the survivors comprising the group known as Sh'erit ha-Pletah originated in central and eastern European countries, while most of those from western European countries returned to them and rehabilitated their lives there.

Most of these refugees gathered in displaced persons camps in the British, French and American occupation zones of Germany, and in Austria and Italy. The conditions in these camps were harsh and primitive at first, but once basic survival needs were being met, the refugees organized representatives on a camp-by-camp basis, and then a coordinating organization for the various camps, to present their needs and requests to the authorities, supervise cultural and educational activities in the camps, and advocate that they be allowed to leave Europe and immigrate to the British Mandatory Palestine or other countries.

The first meeting of representatives of survivors in the DP camps took place a few weeks after the end of the war, on 27 May 1945, at the St. Ottilien camp, where they formed and named the organization "Sh'erit ha-Pletah" to act on their behalf with the Allied authorities. After most survivors in the DP camps had immigrated to other countries or resettled, the Central Committee of She'arit Hapleta disbanded in December 1950 and the organization dissolved itself in the British Zone of Germany in August 1951.

The term "Sh'erit ha-Pletah" is thus usually used in reference to Jewish refugees and displaced persons in the period after the war from 1945 to about 1950. In historical research, this term is used for Jews in Europe and North Africa in the five years or so after World War II.

=== Displaced persons camps ===
After the end of World War II, most non-Jews who had been displaced by the Nazis returned to their homes and communities. For Jews, however, tens of thousands had no homes, families or communities to which they could return. Furthermore, having experienced the horrors of the Holocaust, many wanted to leave Europe entirely and restore their lives elsewhere where they would encounter less antisemitism. Other Jews who attempted to return to their previous residences were forced to leave again upon finding their homes and property stolen by their former neighbors and, particularly in central and eastern Europe, after being met with hostility and violence.

Since they had nowhere else to go, about 50,000 homeless Holocaust survivors gathered in Displaced Persons (DP) camps in Germany, Austria, and Italy. Emigration to Mandatory Palestine was still strictly limited by the British government and emigration to other countries such as the United States was also severely restricted. The first groups of survivors in the DP camps were joined by Jewish refugees from central and eastern Europe, fleeing to the British and American occupation zones in Germany as post-war conditions worsened in the east. By 1946, an estimated 250,000 displaced Jewish survivors – about 185,000 in Germany, 45,000 in Austria, and 20,000 in Italy – were housed in hundreds of refugee centers and DP camps administered by the militaries of the United States, Great Britain and France, and the United Nations Relief and Rehabilitation Administration (UNRRA).

Survivors initially endured dreadful conditions in the DP camps. The camp facilities were very poor, and many survivors were suffering from severe physical and psychological problems. Aid from the outside was slow at first to reach the survivors. Furthermore, survivors often found themselves in the same camps as German prisoners and Nazi collaborators, who had been their tormentors until just recently, along with a larger number of freed aryan forced laborers, and ethnic German refugees fleeing the Soviet army, and there were frequent incidents of anti-Jewish violence. Within a few months, following the visit and report of President Roosevelt's representative, Earl G. Harrison, the United States authorities recognized the need to set up separate DP camps for Jewish survivors and improve the living conditions in the DP camps. The British military administration, however, was much slower to act, fearing that recognizing the unique situation of the Jewish survivors might somehow be perceived as endorsing their calls to emigrate to British Palestine and further antagonizing the Arabs there. Thus, the Jewish refugees tended to gather in the DP camps in the American zone.

The DP camps were created as temporary centers for facilitating the resettlement of the homeless Jewish refugees and to take care of immediate humanitarian needs, but they also became temporary communities where survivors began to rebuild their lives. With assistance sent from Jewish relief organizations such as the Joint Distribution Committee (JDC) in the United States and the Jewish Relief Unit in Britain, hospitals were opened, along with schools, especially in several of the camps where there were large numbers of children and orphans, and the survivors resumed cultural activities and religious practices. Many of their efforts were in preparations for emigration from Europe to new and productive lives elsewhere. They established committees to represent their issues to the Allied authorities and to a wider audience, under the Hebrew name, Sh'erit ha-Pletah, an organization which existed until the early 1950s. Political life rejuvenated and a leading role was taken by the Zionist movement, with most of the Jewish DPs declaring their intention of moving to a Jewish state in British Palestine

The slow and erratic handling of the issues regarding Jewish DPs and refugees, and the substantial increase of people in the DP camps in 1946 and 1947, gained international attention; public opinion resulted in increased political pressure to lift restriction on immigration to countries such as the United States, Canada, and Australia, as well as on the British authorities to stop detaining refugees who were attempting to leave Europe for Palestine, and imprisoning them in internment camps on Cyprus or returning them to Europe. Britain's treatment of Jewish refugees, such as the handling of the refugee ship Exodus, shocked public opinion around the world and added to international demands to establish an independent state for the Jewish people. This led Britain to refer the matter to the United Nations which voted in 1947 to create a Jewish and an Arab state. Thus, when the British Mandate in Palestine ended in May 1948, the State of Israel was established, and Jewish refugee ships were immediately allowed unrestricted entry. In addition, the United States also changed its immigration policy to allow more Jewish refugees to enter under the provisions of the Displaced Persons Act, while other Western countries also eased curbs on emigration.

The opening of Israel's borders after its independence, as well as the adoption of more lenient emigration regulations in Western countries regarding survivors led to the closure of most of the DP camps by 1952. Föhrenwald, the last functioning DP camp, closed in 1957. About 136,000 Displaced Person camp inhabitants, more than half the total, immigrated to Israel; some 80,000 emigrated to the United States, and the remainder emigrated to other countries, including Canada, Australia, South Africa, Mexico, Argentina and Uruguay.

=== Searching for survivors ===
As soon as the war ended, survivors began looking for family members, and for most, this was their main goal once their basic needs of finding food, clothing and shelter had been met.

Local Jewish committees in Europe tried to register the living and account for the dead. Parents sought the children they had hidden in convents, orphanages or with foster families. Other survivors returned to their original homes to look for relatives or gather news and information about them, hoping for a reunion or at least the certainty of knowing if a loved one had perished. The International Red Cross and Jewish relief organizations set up tracing services to support these searches, but inquiries often took a long time because of the difficulties in communications, and the displacement of millions of people by the conflict, the Nazi policies of deportation and destruction, and the mass relocations of populations in central and eastern Europe.

Location services were set up by organizations such as the World Jewish Congress, the Hebrew Immigrant Aid Society (HIAS) and the Jewish Agency for Palestine. This resulted in the successful reunification of survivors, sometimes decades after their separation during the war. For example, the Location Service of the American Jewish Congress, in cooperation with other organizations, ultimately traced 85,000 survivors successfully and reunited 50,000 widely scattered relatives with their families in all parts of the world. However, the process of searching for and finding lost relatives sometimes took years and, for many survivors, continued until the end of their lives. In many cases, survivors searched all their lives for family members, without learning of their fates.

In Israel, to where many Holocaust survivors immigrated, some relatives reunited after encountering each other by chance. Many survivors also found relatives from whom they had been separated through notices for missing relatives posted in newspapers and a radio program dedicated to reuniting families called Who Recognizes, Who Knows?

==== Lists of survivors ====
Initially, survivors simply posted hand-written notes on message boards in the relief centers, Displaced Person's camps or Jewish community buildings where they were located, in the hope that family members or friends for whom they were looking would see them, or at the very least, that other survivors would pass on information about the people whom they were seeking. Others published notices in DP camp and survivor organization newsletters, and in newspapers, in the hopes of reconnecting with relatives who had found refuge in other places. Some survivors contacted the Red Cross and other organizations that produced lists of survivors, such as the United Nations Relief and Rehabilitation Administration, which established a Central Tracing Bureau to help survivors locate relatives who had survived the concentration camps.

Various lists were collated into larger booklets and publications, which were more permanent than the original notes or newspaper notices. One such early compilation, "Sharit Ha-Platah" (Surviving Remnant), was published in 1946 in several volumes with the names of tens of thousands of Jews who survived the Holocaust, collected mainly by Abraham Klausner, a United States Army chaplain who visited many of the Displaced Persons camps in southern Germany and gathered lists of the people there, subsequently adding additional names from other areas.

The first "Register of Jewish Survivors" (Pinkas HaNitzolim I) was published by the Jewish Agency's Search Bureau for Missing Relatives in 1945, containing over 61,000 names compiled from 166 different lists of Jewish survivors in various European countries. A second volume of the "Register of Jewish Survivors" (Pinkas HaNitzolim II) was also published in 1945, with the names of some 58,000 Jews in Poland.

Newspapers outside of Europe also began to publish lists of survivors and their locations as more specific information about the Holocaust became known towards the end of, and after, the war. Thus, for example, the German-Jewish newspaper "Aufbau", published in New York City, printed numerous lists of Jewish Holocaust survivors located in Europe, from September 1944 until 1946.

Over time, many Holocaust survivor registries were established. Initially, these were paper records, but from the 1990s, an increasing number of records have been digitized and made available online.

==== Hidden children ====
Following the war, Jewish parents often spent months and years searching for the children they had sent into hiding. In fortunate cases, they found their children were still with the original rescuer. Many, however, had to resort to notices in newspapers, tracing services, and survivor registries in the hope of finding their children. These searches frequently ended in heartbreak – parents discovered that their child had been killed or had gone missing and could not be found. For hidden children, thousands who had been concealed with Aryans were now orphans and no surviving family members remained alive to retrieve them.

For children who had been hidden to escape the Nazis, more was often at stake than simply finding or being found by relatives. Those who had been very young when they were placed into hiding did not remember their biological parents or their Jewish origins and the only family that they had known was that of their rescuers. When they were found by relatives or Jewish organizations, they were usually afraid, and resistant to leave the only caregivers they remembered. Many had to struggle to rediscover their real identities.

In some instances, rescuers refused to give up hidden children, particularly in cases where they were orphans, did not remember their identities, or had been sheltered in Religious institutions. Jewish organizations and relatives had to struggle to recover these children, including custody battles in the courts. For example, the Finaly Affair only ended in 1953, when the two young Finaly brothers, orphaned survivors in the custody of the Catholic Church in Grenoble, France, were handed over to the guardianship of their aunt, after intensive efforts to secure their return to their family.

In the 21st century, the development of DNA testing for genealogical purposes has sometimes provided essential information to people trying to find relatives from whom they were separated during the Holocaust, or to recover their Jewish identity, especially Jewish children who were hidden or adopted by non-Jewish families during the war.

=== Immigration and absorption ===
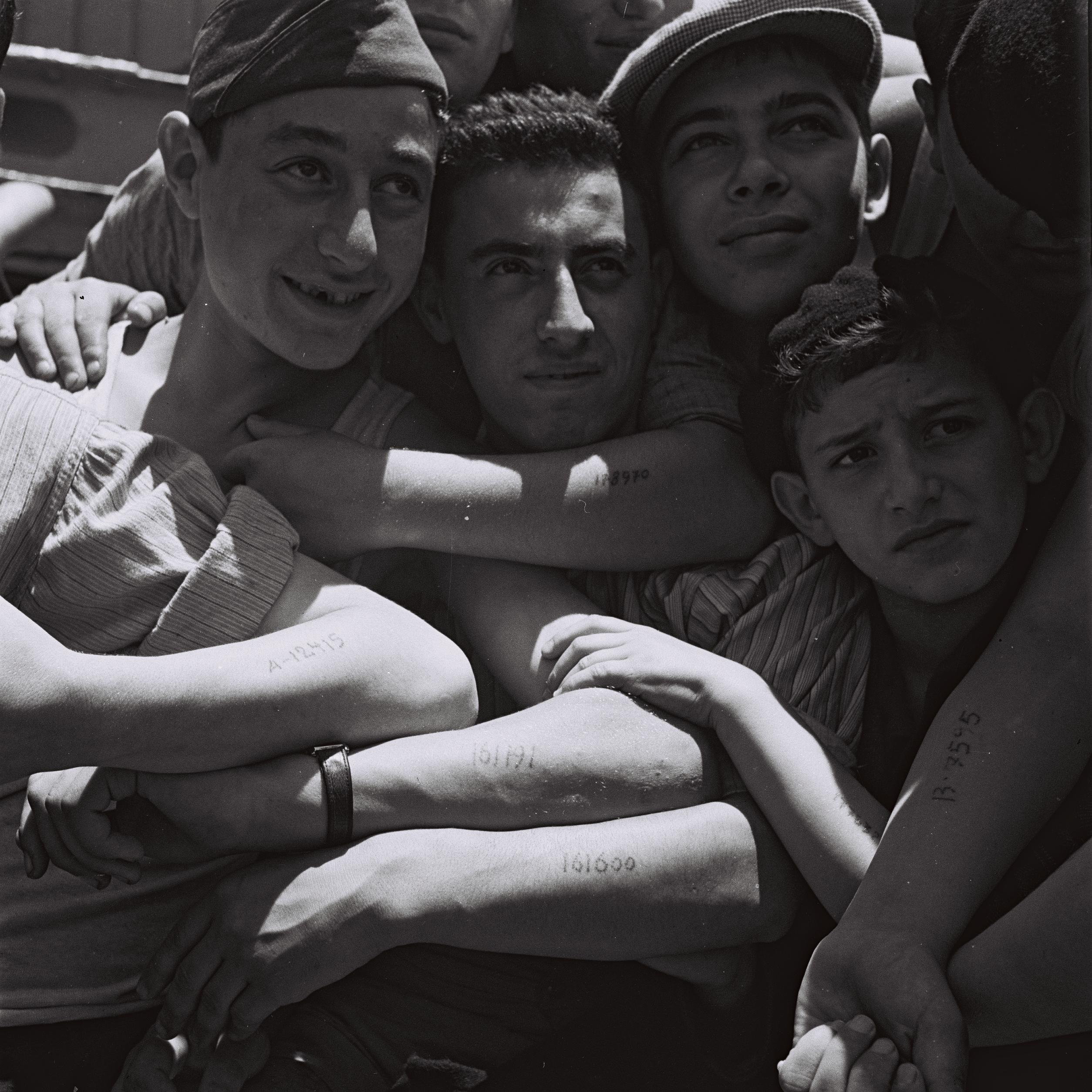
Young Holocaust survivors aboard the refugee ship Mataroa arrive in Haifa port, July 1945

After the war, anti-Jewish violence occurred in several central and Eastern European countries, motivated to varying extents by economic antagonism, increased by alarm that returning survivors would try to reclaim their stolen houses and property, as well as age-old antisemitic myths, most notably the blood libel and also the new racial antisemitism. The largest anti-Jewish pogrom occurred in July 1946 in Kielce, a city in southeastern Poland, when rioters killed 42 people and wounded 50 more. As news of the Kielce pogrom spread, Jews began to flee from Poland, perceiving that there was no viable future for them there, and this pattern of post-war anti-Jewish violence repeated itself in other countries such as Hungary, Romania, Slovakia and Ukraine. Most survivors sought to leave Europe and build new lives elsewhere.

Thus, about 50,000 survivors gathered in Displaced Persons (DP) camps in Germany, Austria, and Italy and were joined by Jewish refugees fleeing from central and eastern Europe, particularly Poland, as post-war conditions there worsened. By 1946, there were an estimated 250,000 Jewish displaced persons, of whom 185,000 were in Germany, 45,000 in Austria, and about 20,000 in Italy. As the British Mandate in Palestine ended in May 1948 and the State of Israel was established, nearly two-thirds of the survivors immigrated there. Others went to Western countries as restrictions were eased and opportunities for them to emigrate arose.

== Rehabilitation ==
=== Psychological care ===
Holocaust survivors suffered from the war years and afterward in many different ways, physically, mentally and emotionally.

Most survivors were deeply traumatized both physically and mentally and some of the effects lasted throughout their lives. This was expressed, among other ways, in the emotional and mental trauma of feeling that they were on a "different planet" that they could not share with others; that they had not or could not process the mourning for their murdered loved ones because at the time they were consumed with the effort required for survival; and many experienced guilt that they had survived when others had not. This dreadful period engulfed some survivors with both physical and mental scars, which were subsequently characterized by researchers as "concentration camp syndrome" (also known as survivor syndrome).

Nonetheless, many survivors drew on inner strength and learned to cope, restored their lives, moved to a new place, started a family and developed successful careers. Holocaust survivors also found communal support extremely beneficial. The Kibbutzim in Israel serve as a prime example of a community that provided the survivors with a sense of purpose and community which allowed them to cope with their trauma by providing support in community.

== Memoirs and testimonies ==
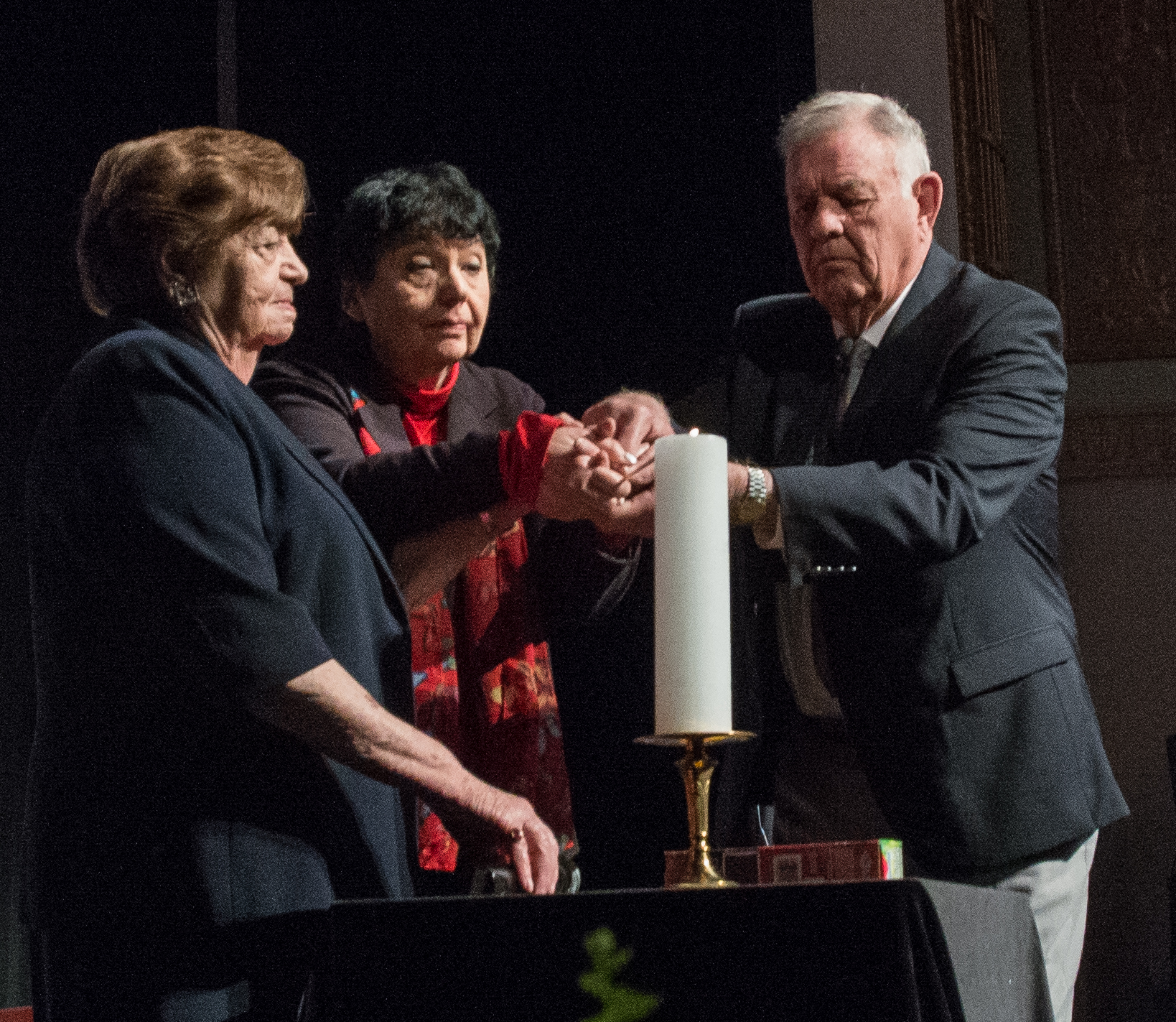
Holocaust survivors light a memorial candle with a concentration camp liberator at a remembrance ceremony, Washington DC, 2013.

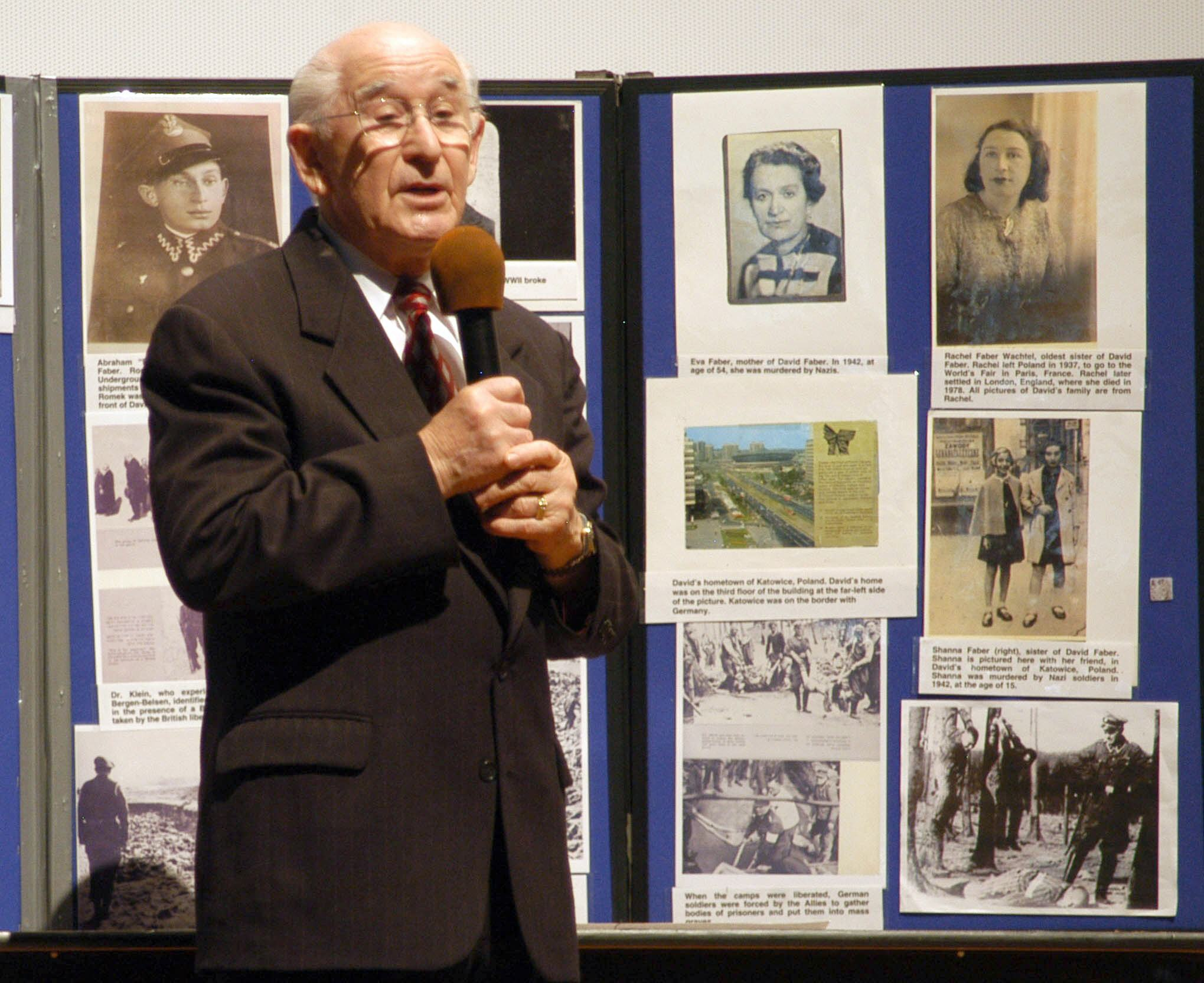
Holocaust survivor David Faber speaks in 2006 about his experiences in nine different concentration camps between 1939 and 1945.

After the war, many Holocaust survivors engaged in efforts to record testimonies about their experiences during the war, and to memorialize lost family members and destroyed communities. These efforts included both personal accounts and memoirs of events written by individual survivors about the events that they had experienced, as well as the compilation of remembrance books for destroyed communities called Yizkor books, usually printed by societies or groups of survivors from a common locality.

Survivors and witnesses also participated in providing oral testimonies about their experiences. At first, these were mainly for the purpose of prosecuting war criminals and often only many years later, for the sake of recounting their experiences to help process the traumatic events that they had suffered, or for the historical record and educational purposes.

Several programs were undertaken by organizations, such the as the USC Shoah Foundation Institute, to collect as many oral history testimonies of survivors as possible. In addition, survivors also began speaking at educational and commemorative events at schools and for other audiences, as well as contributing to and participating in the building of museums and memorials to remember the Holocaust.

=== Memoirs ===
Some survivors began to publish memoirs immediately after the war ended, feeling a need to write about their experiences, and about a dozen or so survivors' memoirs were published each year during the first two decades after the Holocaust, notwithstanding a general public that was largely indifferent to reading them. However, many survivors felt that they could not describe their experiences to those who had not lived through the Holocaust. Those who were able to record testimony about their experiences or publish their memoirs did so in Yiddish.

The number of memoirs that were published increased gradually from the 1970s onwards, indicating both the increasing need and psychological ability of survivors to relate their experiences, as well as a growing public interest in the Holocaust driven by events such as the capture and trial of Adolf Eichmann in 1961, the existential threats to Jews presented by the Six-Day War in 1967 and the Yom Kippur War of 1973, the broadcasting in many countries of the television documentary series "Holocaust" in 1978, and the establishment of new Holocaust memorial centers and memorials, such as the United States Holocaust Memorial Museum.

The writing and publishing of memoirs, prevalent among Holocaust survivors, has been recognized as related to processing and recovering from memories about the traumatic past. By the end of the 20th century, Holocaust memoirs had been written by Jews not only in Yiddish, but also other languages including Hebrew, English, French, Italian, Polish and Russian. They were written by concentration/death camp survivors, and also those who had been in hiding, or who had managed to flee from Nazi-held territories before or during the war, and sometimes they also described events after the Holocaust, including the liberation and rebuilding of lives in the aftermath of destruction.

Survivor memoirs, like other personal accounts such as oral testimony and diaries, are a significant source of information for most scholars of the history of the Holocaust, complementing more traditional sources of historical information, and presenting events from the unique points of view of individual experiences within the much greater totality, and these accounts are essential to an understanding of the Holocaust experience. While historians and survivors themselves are aware that the retelling of experiences is subjective to the source of information and sharpness of memory, they are recognized as collectively having "a firm core of shared memory" and the main substance of the accounts does not negate minor contradictions and inaccuracies in some of the details.

=== Yizkor books ===
Yizkor (Remembrance) books were compiled and published by groups of survivors or landsmanshaft societies of former residents to memorialize lost family members and destroyed communities and was one of the earliest ways in which the Holocaust was communally commemorated. The first of these books appeared in the 1940s and almost all were typically published privately rather than by publishing companies. Over 1,000 books of this type are estimated to have been published, albeit in very limited quantities.

Most of these books are written in Yiddish or Hebrew, while some also include sections in English or other languages, depending on where they were published. The first Yizkor books were published in the United States, mainly in Yiddish, the mother tongue of the landsmanschaften and Holocaust survivors. Beginning in the 1950s, after the mass immigration of Holocaust survivors to the newly independent State of Israel, most of the Yizkor books were published there, primarily between the mid-1950s and the mid-1970s. From the later 1970s, there was a decline in the number of collective memorial books but an increase in the number of survivors' personal memoirs. Most of the Yizkor books were devoted to the Eastern European Jewish communities in Poland, Russia, Lithuania, Latvia, Romania and Hungary, with fewer dedicated to the communities of south-eastern Europe.

Since the 1990s, many of these books, or sections of them have been translated into English, digitized, and made available online.

=== Testimonies and oral histories ===
In the immediate post-war period, officials of the DP camps and organizations providing relief to the survivors conducted interviews with survivors primarily for the purposes of providing physical assistance and assisting with relocation. Interviews were also conducted for the purpose of gathering evidence about war crimes and for the historical record. These were among the first of the recorded testimonies of the survivors Holocaust experiences.

Some of the first projects to collect witness testimonies began in the DP camps, amongst the survivors themselves. Camp papers like Undzer Shtimme ("Our Voice"), published in Hohne Camp (Bergen-Belsen), and Undzer Hofenung ("Our Hope"), published in Eschwege camp, (Kassel) carried the first eyewitness accounts of Jewish experiences under Nazi rule, and one of the first publications on the Holocaust, Fuhn Letsn Khurbn, ("About the Recent Destruction"), was produced by DP camp members, and was eventually distributed around the world.

In the following decades, a concerted effort was made to record the memories and testimonials of survivors for posterity. French Jews were amongst the first to establish an institute devoted to documentation of the Holocaust at the Center of Contemporary Jewish Documentation. In Israel, the Yad Vashem memorial was officially established in 1953; the organization had already begun projects including acquiring Holocaust documentation and personal testimonies of survivors for its archives and library.

The largest collection of testimonials was ultimately gathered at the USC Shoah Foundation Institute, which was founded by Steven Spielberg in 1994 after he made the film Schindler's List. Originally named the Survivors of the Shoah Visual History Foundation, it became a part of the University of Southern California in 2006. The foundation's mission was to videotape the personal accounts of 50,000 Holocaust survivors and other witnesses, a goal which it achieved in 1999 and then surpassed.

In 2002, a collection of Sinti and Roma Holocaust survivor testimonies opened at the Documentation and Cultural Centre of German Sinti and Roma in Heidelberg, Germany.

== Organizations and conferences ==
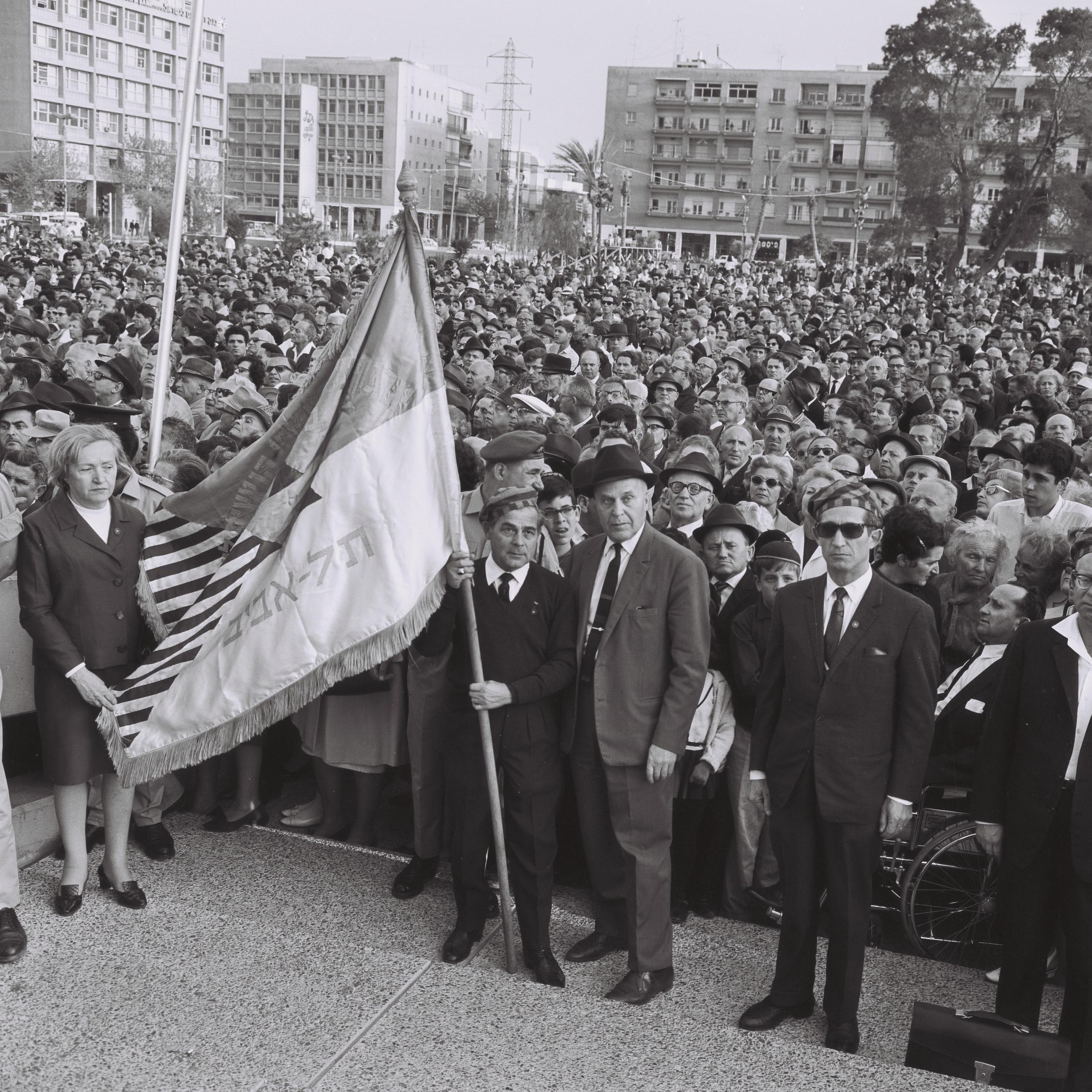
Warsaw Ghetto and Concentration Camps Survivors' meeting rally in Tel Aviv, 1968

A wide range of organizations have been established to address the needs and issues of Holocaust survivors and their descendants. Immediately following the war, "Sh'erit ha-Pletah" was established to meet the immediate physical and rehabilitation needs in the Displaced Persons camps and to advocate for rights to immigrate. Once these aims had largely been met by the early 1950s, the organization was disbanded. In the following decades, survivors established both local, national and eventually international organizations to address longer term physical, emotional and social needs, and organizations for specific groups such as child survivors and descendants, especially children, of survivors were also set up. Starting in the late 1970s, conferences and gatherings of survivors, their descendants, as well as rescuers and liberators began to take place and were often the impetus for the establishment and maintenance of permanent organizations.

=== Survivors ===
In 1981, around 6,000 Holocaust survivors gathered in Jerusalem for the first World Gathering of Jewish Holocaust Survivors.

In 1988, the Center of Organizations of Holocaust Survivors in Israel, was established as an umbrella organization of 28 Holocaust survivor groups in Israel to advocate for survivors' rights and welfare worldwide and to the Government of Israel, and to commemorate the Holocaust and revival of the Jewish people. In 2010 it was recognized by the government as the representative organization for the entire survivor population in Israel. In 2020, it represented 55 organizations and a survivor population whose average age was 84.

=== Child survivors ===
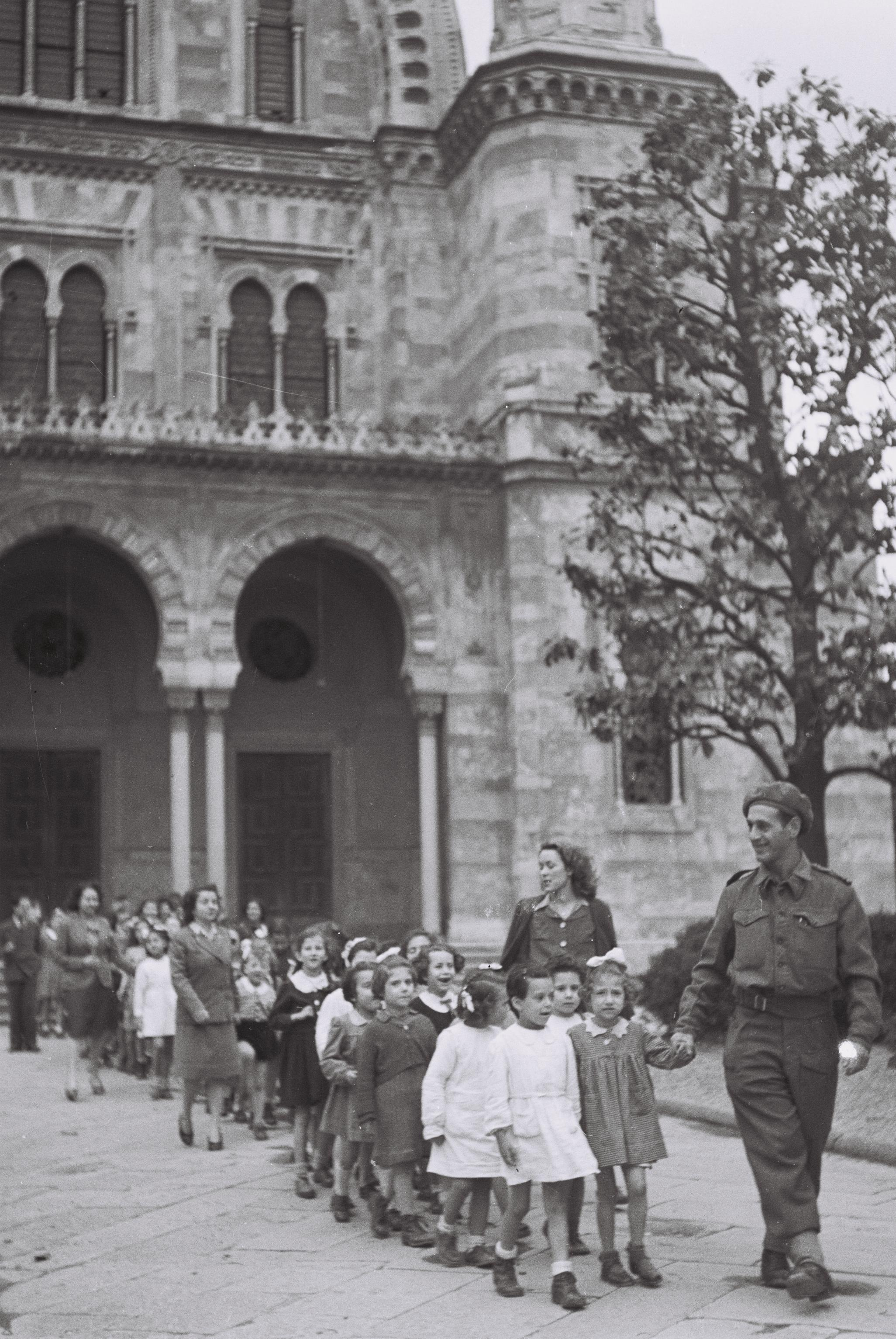
A Jewish Brigade soldier and nurses of the Jewish Agency taking care of Jewish refugee children in Florence, Italy, 1944

Child survivors of the Holocaust were often the only ones who remained alive from their entire extended families, while even more were orphans. This group of survivors included children who had survived in the concentration/death camps, in hiding with Aryan families or in Religious institutions, or had been sent out of harm's way by their parents on Kindertransports, or by escaping with their families to remote locations in the Soviet Union, or Shanghai in China. After the war, child survivors were sometimes sent to be cared for by distant relatives in other parts of the world, sometimes accepted unwillingly, and mistreated or even abused. Their experiences, memories and understanding of the terrible events they had suffered as child victims of the Nazis and their accomplices was given little consideration.

In the 1970s and 80s, small groups of these survivors, now adults, began to form in a number of communities worldwide to deal with their painful pasts in safe and understanding environments. The First International Conference on Children of Holocaust Survivors took place in 1979 under the auspices of Zachor, the Holocaust Resource Center. The conference was attended by some 500 survivors, survivors' children and mental health professionals and established a network for children of survivors of the Holocaust in the United States and Canada.

The International Network of Children of Jewish Holocaust Survivors held its first international conference in New York City in 1984, attended by more than 1,700 children of survivors of the Holocaust with the stated purpose of creating greater understanding of the Holocaust and its impact on the contemporary world and establishing contacts among the children of survivors in the United States and Canada.

The World Federation of Jewish Child Survivors of the Holocaust and Descendants was founded in 1985 to bring child survivors together and coordinate worldwide activities. The organization began holding annual conferences in cities in the United States, Canada, Europe and Israel. Descendants of survivors were also recognized as having been deeply affected by their families' histories. In addition to the annual conferences to build community among child survivors and their descendants, members speak about their histories of survival and loss, of resilience, of the heroism of Jewish resistance and self-help for other Jews, and of the Righteous Among the Nations, at schools, public and community events; they participate in Holocaust Remembrance ceremonies and projects; and campaign against antisemitism and bigotry.

== Second generation of survivors ==
The "second generation of Holocaust survivors" is the name given to children born after World War II to a parent or parents who survived the Holocaust. Although the second generation did not directly experience the horrors of the Holocaust, the impact of their parents' trauma is often evident in their upbringing and outlooks and, from the 1960s, children of survivors began exploring and expressing in various ways what the implications of being children of Holocaust survivors meant to them. This conversation broadened public discussion of the events and impacts of the Holocaust.

The second generation of the Holocaust has raised several research questions in psychology, and psychological studies have been conducted to determine how their parents' horrendous experiences affected their lives, among them, whether psychological trauma experienced by a parent can be passed on to their children even when they were not present during the ordeal, as well as the psychological manifestations of this transference of trauma to the second generation.

Soon after descriptions of concentration camp syndrome (also known as survivor syndrome) appeared, clinicians observed in 1966 that large numbers of children of Holocaust survivors were seeking treatment in clinics in Canada. The grandchildren of Holocaust survivors were also over-represented by 300 percent among the referrals to a child psychiatry clinic in comparison with their representation in the general population.

A communication pattern that psychologists have identified as a communication feature between parents who experienced trauma and their children has been referred to as the "connection of silence". This silent connection is the tacit assent, in the families of Holocaust survivors, not to discuss the trauma of the parent and to disconnect it from the daily life of the family. The parent's need for this is not only due to their need to forget and adapt to their lives after the trauma, but also to protect their children's psyches from being harmed by their depictions of the atrocities that they experienced during the Holocaust.

Awareness groups have thus developed, in which children of survivors explore their feelings in a group that shares and can better understand their experiences as children of Holocaust survivors. Some second-generation survivors have also organized local and even national groups for mutual support and to pursue additional goals and aims regarding Holocaust issues. For example, in November 1979, the First Conference on Children of Holocaust Survivors was held, and resulted in the establishment of support groups all over the United States.

Many members of the "second generation" have sought ways to get past their suffering as children of Holocaust survivors and to integrate their experiences and those of their parents into their lives. For example, some have become involved in activities to commemorate the lives of people and ways of life of communities that were wiped out during the Holocaust. They research the history of Jewish life in Europe before the war and the Holocaust itself; participate in the renewal of Yiddish culture; engage in educating others about the Holocaust; fight against Holocaust denial, antisemitism and racism; become politically active, such as with regard to finding and prosecuting Nazis, or by taking up Jewish or humanitarian causes; and through creative means such as theater, art and literature, examine the Holocaust and its consequences on themselves and their families.

In April 1983, Holocaust survivors in North America established the American Gathering of Jewish Holocaust Survivors and their Descendants; the first event was attended by President Ronald Reagan and 20,000 survivors and their families.

Amcha, the Israeli Center for Psychological and Social Support for Holocaust Survivors and the Second Generation was established in Jerusalem in 1987 to serve survivors and their families.

== Survivor registries and databases ==
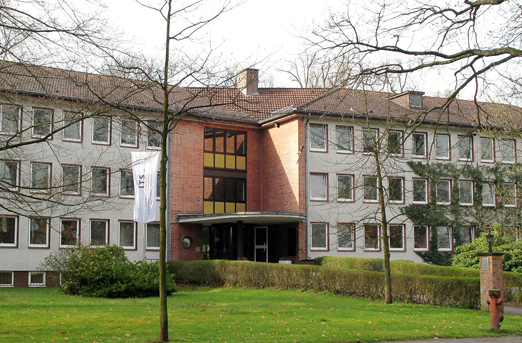
The Arolsen Archives-International Center on Nazi Persecution in Bad Arolsen, Germany, a repository of information on victims of Nazi persecution, including survivors

One of the most well-known and comprehensive archives of Holocaust-era records, including lists of survivors, is the Arolsen Archives-International Center on Nazi Persecution founded by the Allies in 1948 as the International Tracing Service (ITS). For decades after the war, in response to inquiries, the main tasks of ITS were determining the fates of victims of Nazi persecution and searching for missing people.

The Holocaust Global Registry is an online collection of databases maintained by the Jewish genealogical website JewishGen, an affiliate of the Museum of Jewish Heritage – A Living Memorial to the Holocaust; it contains thousands of names of both survivors trying to find family and family searching for survivors.

The Holocaust Survivors and Victims Database, maintained by the United States Holocaust Memorial Museum, contains millions of names of people persecuted under the Nazi regime, including concentration camp or displaced persons camp lists that can be searched by place name or keywords.

The Benjamin and Vladka Meed Registry of Holocaust Survivors, created in 1981 by the American Gathering of Jewish Holocaust Survivors to document the experiences of survivors and assist survivors and their families trying to trace missing relatives and friends, includes over 200,000 records related to survivors and their families from around the world.

In partnership with the Arolsen Archives, the family history website Ancestry began digitizing millions of Holocaust and Nazi-persecution records and making them searchable online in 2019. Two distinct databases included in the records are the "Africa, Asia and European passenger lists of displaced persons (1946 to 1971)" and "Europe, Registration of Foreigners and German Individuals Persecuted (1939–1947)".

The Holocaust Survivor Children: Missing Identity website addresses the issue of child survivors still hoping to find relatives or people who can tell them about their parents and family, and others who hope to find out basic information about themselves such as their original names, dates and place of birth, and parents' names, based on a photograph of themselves as a child.

== See also ==
- List of Holocaust survivors
- Aftermath of the Holocaust
- Armenian genocide survivors
