= Cibla =

Village in Latvia

- Village
- Cibla's location in Latvia
- Coordinates: 56°33′2.34″N 27°53′1.68″E
- Country: Latvia
- Municipality: Ludza
- Parish: Cibla

Population
  - Total: 216

Cibla is a village in Cibla Parish, Ludza Municipality in the Latgale region of Latvia.

== See also ==
- Cibla Parish
