= Cibla Parish =

Parish in Ludza Municipality, Latvia

- parish of Latvia
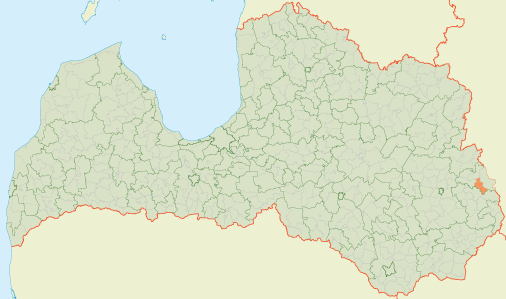
- Coordinates: 56°32′00″N 27°55′07″E
- Country: Latvia

Population (1 January 2026)
  - Total: 560

Cibla Parish (Latvian: Ciblas pagasts, Latgalian: Ciblys pogosts) is an administrative unit of Ludza Municipality in the Latgale region of Latvia.

It was a part of Cibla Municipality from 2009 to its merge into Ludza Municipality on 1 July 2021.
