= Rechke =

Village in Minsk Region, Belarus

Rechke Рэчкі (Belarusian) רעטשקי (Yiddish)
- Village
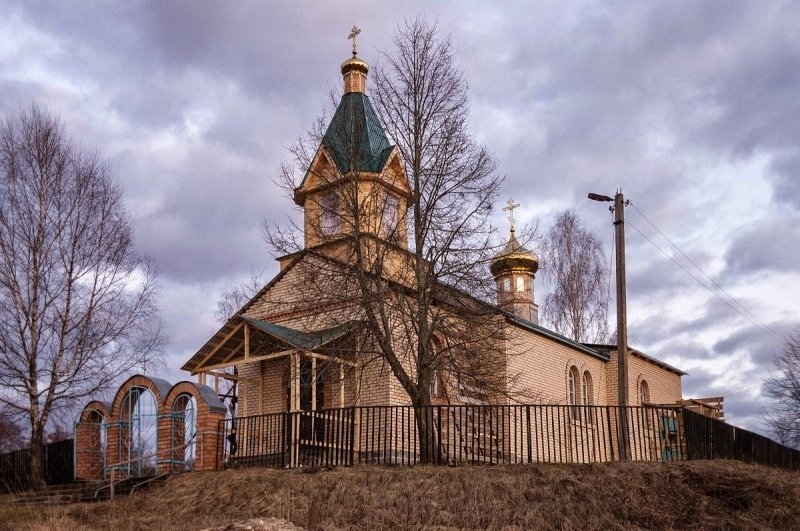
- New Church of the Holy Spirit on the site of the burned Church of the Holy Spirit

- Location in Belarus
- Coordinates: 54°34′59″N 27°5′36″E
- Country: Belarus
- Region: Minsk Region
- District: Vilyeyka District
- Rural Council: Kryvaselski Rural Council

Population (2008)
  - Total: 118
- Postal code: 222445

Rechke (Belarusian: Рэчкі, Yiddish: רעטשקי) is a village in Belarus, located on the Zhuchka River. It is part of the Krivoselsky Village Council (Krivoselsky Selsoviet) in the Vilyeyka District of the Minsk Region.

Rechke is an old shtetl of the historical Ashmyany region (part of the Vilna Governorate).

== History ==
In 1859, Rechke had 21 households. In 1864, Russian authorities opened a public school in the area. By 1866, the town had 24 households. In 1886, Rechke was part of the Rabun volost and had 26 households, a church, a synagogue, a school, a windmill, and 2 taverns.
