= Saguny, Voronezh Oblast =

Saguny Сагуны
- Sloboda
- Location within Voronezh Oblast Location within Russia
- Coordinates: 50°35′N 39°43′E
- Country: Russia
- Region: Voronezh Oblast
- District: Podgorensky District
- Time zone: UTC+3:00

Saguny (Russian: Сагу́ны) is a rural locality (a sloboda) and the administrative center of Sagunovskoye Rural Settlement, Podgorensky District, Voronezh Oblast, Russia. The population was 1,161 as of 2010. There are 11 streets.

== Geography ==
Saguny is located 35 km (22 mi) north of Podgorensky (the district's administrative centre) by road. Beryozovo is the nearest rural locality.
