= Orpa =

Orpa may refer to:

- Orpa (film)
- Organization of People in Arms (ORPA), Guatemalan guerrilla organization
