= Zakrzówek =

Zakrzówek may refer to the following places in Poland:

- Zakrzówek, part of the Dębniki district of Kraków
- Zakrzówek, Lublin Voivodeship (east Poland)
- Zakrzówek, Garwolin County in Masovian Voivodeship (east-central Poland)
- Zakrzówek, Zwoleń County in Masovian Voivodeship (east-central Poland)
- Zakrzówek, Świętokrzyskie Voivodeship (south-central Poland)
- Gmina Zakrzówek, a rural municipality in Kraśnik County, Lublin Voivodeship
