= Poninka =

Rural locality in Khmelnytskyi Oblast, Ukraine

Poninka Понінка
- Rural settlement
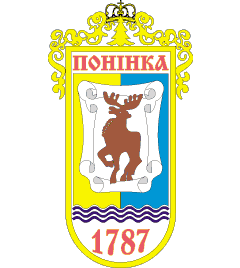
- Coat of arms

- Location within Khmelnytskyi Oblast Location within Ukraine
- Coordinates: 50°11′07″N 27°33′49″E
- Country: Ukraine
- Oblast: Khmelnytskyi Oblast
- Raion: Shepetivka Raion
- Hromada: Poninka settlement hromada
- Founded: 1740
- Town status: 1938

Government
  - Town Head: Valeriy Kostetskyi

Area
  - Total: 1.31 km^{2} (0.51 sq mi)
- Elevation: 228 m (748 ft)

Population (2022)
  - Total: 6,914 ▼
  - Density: 5,280/km^{2} (13,700/sq mi)
- Time zone: UTC+2 (EET)
  - Summer (DST): UTC+3 (EEST)
- Postal code: 30511
- Area code: +380 3843
- Website: http://rada.gov.ua/

Poninka (Ukrainian: Понінка) is a rural settlement in Shepetivka Raion, Khmelnytskyi Oblast, western Ukraine. It hosts the administration of Poninka settlement hromada, one of the hromadas of Ukraine. The settlement's population was 7,937 as of the 2001 Ukrainian Census. Current population: 6,914 (2022 estimate).

== History ==
The settlement was founded in 1740 and it received the status of an urban-type settlement in 1938.

Until 18 July 2020, Poninka belonged to Polonne Raion. The raion was abolished in July 2020 as part of the administrative reform of Ukraine, which reduced the number of raions of Khmelnytskyi Oblast to three. The area of Polonne Raion was merged into Shepetivka Raion.

Until 26 January 2024, Poninka was designated urban-type settlement. On this day, a new law entered into force which abolished this status, and Poninka became a rural settlement.
