= Obech, Belarus =

Coordinates: 52°26′00″N 024°40′00″E

Obech Обеч
- Hamlet
- Interactive map of Obech
- Location within Belarus
- Country: Belarus
- Region: Brest
- District: Pruzhany
- Rural council: Linovsky

Obech is a hamlet in Belarus in the region of Brest, located 252.7 kilometres (157.0 miles) southwest of Minsk. It was formerly a Jewish shtetl.
