= Vaškai =

- Town
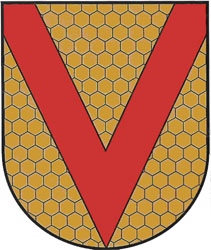
- Coat of arms

- Location within Lithuania
- Coordinates: 56°10′10″N 24°12′40″E
- Country: Lithuania
- County: Panevėžys County

Population (2011)
  - Total: 568
- Time zone: UTC+2 (EET)
  - Summer (DST): UTC+3 (EEST)

Vaškai is a small town in Panevėžys County, in northeastern Lithuania. According to the 2011 census, the town has a population of 568 people.
