= Probizhna =

Rural locality in Ternopil Oblast, Ukraine

Coordinates: 49°02′N 25°59′E

Probizhna (Ukrainian: Пробіжна, Polish: Probużna, Yiddish: פּראָבוזנאַ, romanized: Probuzna, Hebrew: פּראבוזנא, romanized: Prabuzna) is a village in Chortkiv Raion near Chortkiv and Husiatyn in Ternopil Oblast (province) of western Ukraine. It belongs to Kolyndiany urban hromada, one of the hromadas of Ukraine.

Elias Kubrick, the grandfather of film director Stanley Kubrick, was born in Probizhna.
