= Miriam Winter =

Polish Holocaust survivor and writer

Miriam Winter (maiden surname Winter, married surname "Orlowska"; 2 June 1933 – 19 July 2014) was a Polish Holocaust survivor and writer. She is known for her authorship of Trains: A Memoir of a Hidden Childhood during and after World War II, which explores not only her survival of the Holocaust as a 'hidden child' but also the psychological toll of keeping her identity hidden, even to herself, in post-World War II Poland.

She studied theater at the Leon Schiller Advanced State School for Theatre in Łódź before its division into separate theater and film schools. She has directed productions of Antigone, Ondine, and Peer Gynt.

Her parents, maternal grandparents Szymon and Shajna Kohn, younger brother Józio (Josef), and other members of her extended family were murdered at the Treblinka extermination camp.

== Life during World War II ==
Miriam Winter was born in Łódź, Poland to Tobiasz (Tuvyeh) Winter and Majta Laja (Leah) Winter (maiden surname Kohn). World War II began when Miriam was six. Her family was expelled from Łódź by the Nazis and confined first in the Warsaw Ghetto and then in the Ożarów Ghetto, but Miriam's parents were able to sneak her out. She was first taken into custody by a family friend, Czesia. That was until on the train from Ożarów, Czesia found Maryla Dudek, a Catholic Pole, who assumed custody of Miriam but wasn't aware that Miriam was Jewish at the time.

In Lwów (Lemberg), Winter lived in hiding with Maryla until she was detected as Jewish by the other children. This caused them to have to move to Czudek and then to Wola Rzedzińska, which is where Winter lived with a Catholic family. There she was raised Catholic and wanted to be baptized and receive communion, but her priest had apparently suspected her true background and wouldn't baptize her. Instead, her priest devised a scam procedure to make it seem like she met the requirements to not expose her. Despite this, she was still exposed by some of the village people and had to flee to Hucisko, a village where Maryla's sister, Zosia Rumak, lived. After that, she was placed with a couple in the nearby village of Styków but when it was revealed in church that she hadn't been baptized, she expected repercussions and fled back to Hucisko and lived with Zosia. Later she was moved from Hucisko to Raniżów, and it was there that the area was liberated by the Red Army in the summer of 1944.

== Life after World War II ==
After liberation, Miriam lived in Lwów with Maryla, at which point her last name was changed to Dudek, and her birth date from June 1933 to September 1937. This made it easier for Miriam to pass as Maryla's daughter.

When the war was completely over, Miriam lived with Maryla and her husband Rysiu, working in Rysiu's bakery and selling his products. She was also able to attend school once again. However, she fled at the age of 15 after months of being mistreated physically and emotionally, and began living in an orphanage in Szczecin. Miriam enrolled in school once again, graduating high school in 1951.

In 1963, she married Romek Orłowski and gave birth to their first child, Daniel, in 1964. Miriam and her husband applied for emigration and, in 1969, were able to move to the United States, where they had their second Child, David.

She died of cancer.

== Legacy ==
Winter could be found at various signings. One was at the Holocaust Museum in Washington, D.C., on 8 June 2012.
