= Przysiółek =

Type of rural settlements in Poland

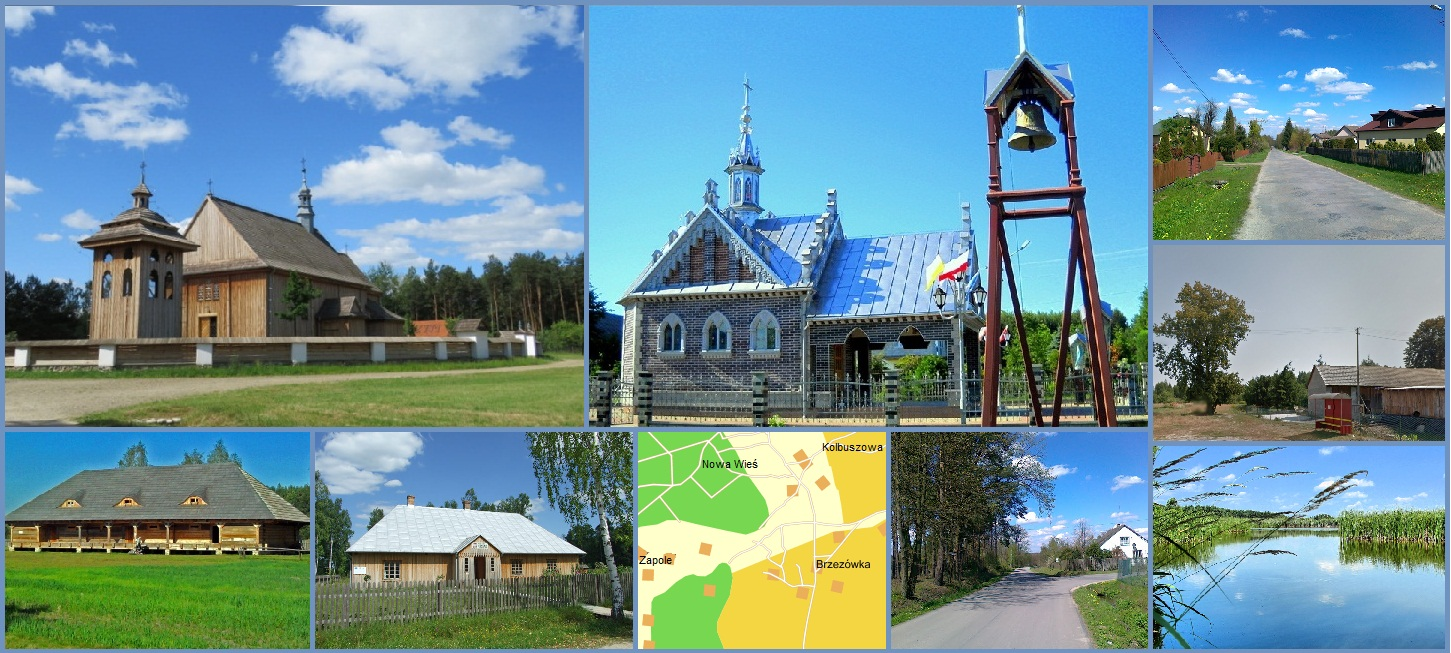
Brzezówka, a przysiółek of Domatków

A przysiółek is a type of rural settlement in Poland. It is a cluster of several farmsteads outside of the compact development of a village, and may constitute an integral part of it. According to a 2021 regulation, przysiółek can be used as an official descriptor of the type of locality. The term is commonly translated as 'hamlet'.

In various regions of Poland, other terms for minor rural settlements are used: rola, kolonia, osiedle, wybudowanie, pustki.

In the Russian language there is a corresponding historical term, Russian: присёлок, romanized: prisyolok, used for rural settlements of the same type. In the historical documents of the Polish-Lithuanian Commonwealth the Latin-language terms convilla, appendium villae were also used.
