= Jagodnik, Podkarpackie Voivodeship =

Jagodnik
- Village
- Location within Poland
- Coordinates: 50°19′N 21°42′E
- Country: Poland
- Voivodeship: Subcarpathian
- County: Kolbuszowa
- Gmina: Cmolas
- Population: app. 500

Jagodnik [jaˈɡɔdnik] is a village in the administrative district of Gmina Cmolas, within Kolbuszowa County, Subcarpathian Voivodeship, in south-eastern Poland. It lies approximately 5 km (3 mi) north-west of Cmolas, 9 km (6 mi) north-west of Kolbuszowa, and 39 km (24 mi) north-west of the regional capital Rzeszów

The approximate population of the village is 500.
