= Poręby Dymarskie =

- Village
- Location within Poland
- Coordinates: 50°19′18″N 21°48′23″E
- Country: Poland
- Voivodeship: Subcarpathian
- County: Kolbuszowa
- Gmina: Cmolas
- Population: 845
- Website: http://poreby.republika.pl

Poręby Dymarskie [pɔˈrɛmbɨ dɨˈmarskʲɛ] is a village in the administrative district of Gmina Cmolas, within Kolbuszowa County, Subcarpathian Voivodeship, in south-eastern Poland.
