= Siedlanka =

- Village
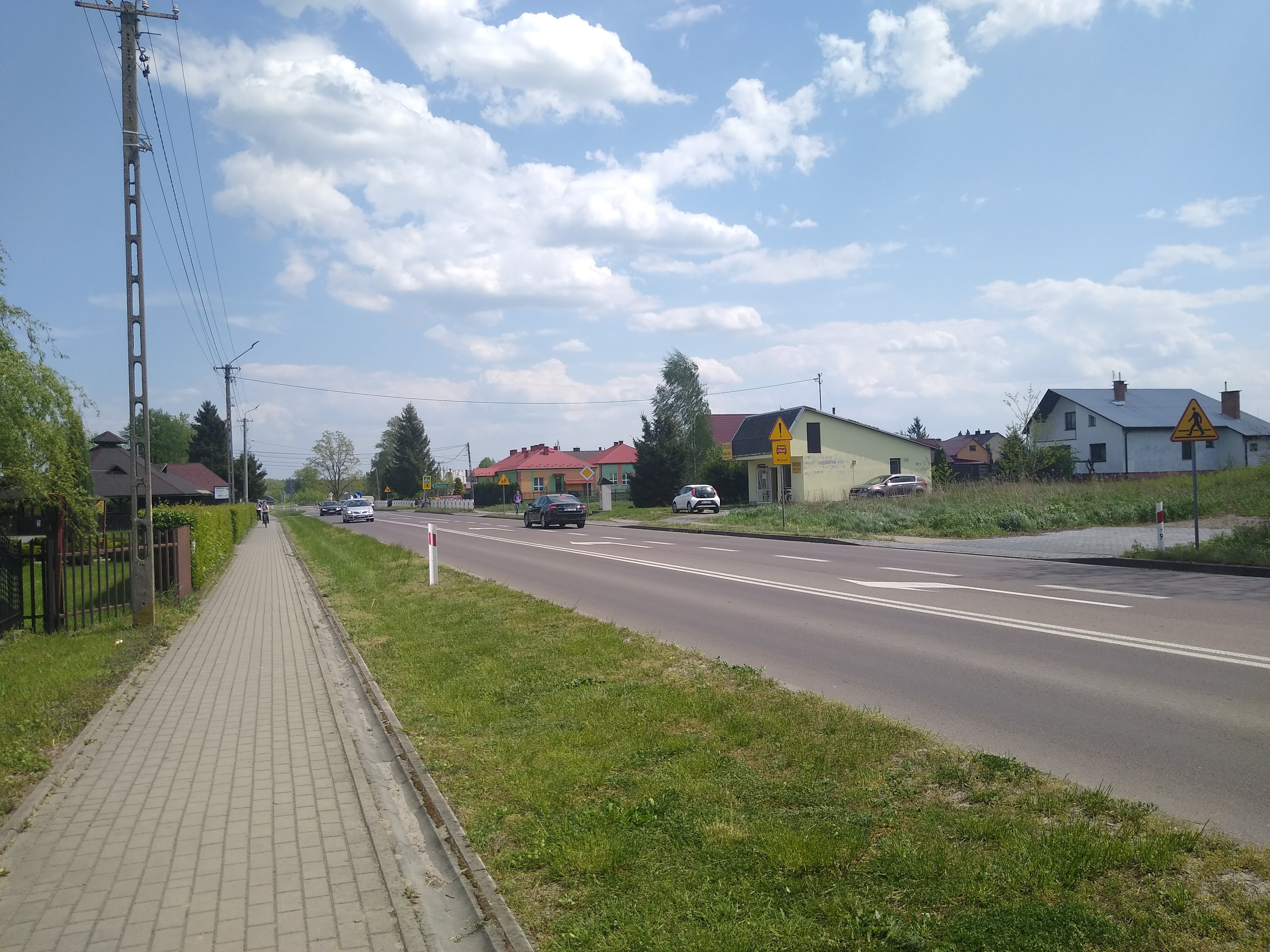

- Location within Poland
- Coordinates: 50°15′33″N 21°40′28″E
- Country: Poland
- Voivodeship: Subcarpathian
- County: Kolbuszowa
- Gmina: Niwiska
- Population: 798

Siedlanka [ɕɛdˈlaŋka] is a village in the administrative district of Gmina Niwiska, within Kolbuszowa County, Subcarpathian Voivodeship, in south-eastern Poland.
