= Mazury, Podkarpackie Voivodeship =

Mazury
- Village
- Location within Poland
- Coordinates: 50°15′50″N 22°3′45″E
- Country: Poland
- Voivodeship: Subcarpathian
- County: Kolbuszowa
- Gmina: Raniżów
- Elevation: 220 m (720 ft)
- Population: 1,010

Mazury [maˈzurɨ] is a village in the administrative district of Gmina Raniżów, within Kolbuszowa County, Subcarpathian Voivodeship, in south-eastern Poland.
