= Staniszewskie =

- Village
- Location within Poland
- Coordinates: 50°15′N 22°0′E
- Country: Poland
- Voivodeship: Subcarpathian
- County: Kolbuszowa
- Gmina: Raniżów

Staniszewskie [staniˈʂɛfskʲɛ] is a village in the administrative district of Gmina Raniżów, within Kolbuszowa County, Subcarpathian Voivodeship, in south-eastern Poland.
