= Poręby Kupieńskie =

- Village
- Location within Poland
- Coordinates: 50°11′N 21°51′E
- Country: Poland
- Voivodeship: Subcarpathian
- County: Kolbuszowa
- Gmina: Kolbuszowa

Poręby Kupieńskie [pɔˈrɛmbɨ kuˈpjɛɲskʲɛ] is a village in the administrative district of Gmina Kolbuszowa, within Kolbuszowa County, Subcarpathian Voivodeship, in south-eastern Poland.
