= Wola Raniżowska =

- Village
- Location within Poland
- Coordinates: 50°18′N 21°58′E
- Country: Poland
- Voivodeship: Subcarpathian
- County: Kolbuszowa
- Gmina: Raniżów

Wola Raniżowska [ˈvɔla raniˈʐɔfska] (German: Ronischau) is a village in the administrative district of Gmina Raniżów, within Kolbuszowa County, Subcarpathian Voivodeship, in south-eastern Poland.
