= Toporów, Podkarpackie Voivodeship =

Toporów
- Village
- Location within Poland
- Coordinates: 50°18′54″N 21°35′41″E
- Country: Poland
- Voivodeship: Subcarpathian
- County: Kolbuszowa
- Gmina: Cmolas

Toporów [tɔˈpɔruf] is a village in the administrative district of Gmina Cmolas, within Kolbuszowa County, Subcarpathian Voivodeship, in south-eastern Poland.
