= Krzątka =

- Village
- Location within Poland
- Coordinates: 50°24′N 21°51′E
- Country: Poland
- Voivodeship: Subcarpathian
- County: Kolbuszowa
- Gmina: Majdan Królewski
- Population: 2,200

Krzątka [ˈkʂɔntka] is a village in the administrative district of Gmina Majdan Królewski, within Kolbuszowa County, Subcarpathian Voivodeship, in south-eastern Poland.
