= Osia Góra =

- Village
- Location within Poland
- Coordinates: 50°15′33″N 21°54′26″E
- Country: Poland
- Voivodeship: Subcarpathian
- County: Kolbuszowa
- Gmina: Dzikowiec

Osia Góra [ˈɔɕa ˈɡura] is a village in the administrative district of Gmina Dzikowiec, within Kolbuszowa County, Subcarpathian Voivodeship, in south-eastern Poland.
