= Stary Rusinów =

- Village
- Location within Poland
- Coordinates: 50°22′21″N 21°51′5″E
- Country: Poland
- Voivodeship: Subcarpathian
- County: Kolbuszowa
- Gmina: Majdan Królewski
- Population: 250

Stary Rusinów [ˈstarɨ ruˈɕinuf] is a village in the administrative district of Gmina Majdan Królewski, within Kolbuszowa County, Subcarpathian Voivodeship, in southeastern Poland.
