= Korczowiska =

- Village
- Location within Poland
- Coordinates: 50°17′50″N 22°4′0″E
- Country: Poland
- Voivodeship: Subcarpathian
- County: Kolbuszowa
- Gmina: Raniżów
- Elevation: 220 m (720 ft)
- Population: 360

Korczowiska [kɔrt͡ʂɔˈviska] is a village in the administrative district of Gmina Raniżów, within Kolbuszowa County, Subcarpathian Voivodeship, in south-eastern Poland.
