= Brzostowa Góra =

- Village
- Location within Poland
- Coordinates: 50°23′N 21°47′E
- Country: Poland
- Voivodeship: Subcarpathian
- County: Kolbuszowa
- Gmina: Majdan Królewski
- Population (2023): 888

Brzostowa Góra [bʐɔsˈtuba ˈɡurá] is a village in the administrative district of Gmina Majdan Królewski, within Kolbuszowa County, Subcarpathian Voivodeship, in south-eastern Poland. As of 31 December 2023, it had a population of 888.
