= Świerczów, Podkarpackie Voivodeship =

Świerczów
- Village
- Location within Poland
- Coordinates: 50°15′N 21°44′E
- Country: Poland
- Voivodeship: Subcarpathian
- County: Kolbuszowa
- Gmina: Kolbuszowa

Świerczów (Polish pronunciation: [ˈɕfjɛrt͡ʂuf]) is a village in the administrative district of Gmina Kolbuszowa, within Kolbuszowa County, Subcarpathian Voivodeship, in south-eastern Poland.
