= Hucina =

- Village
- Location within Poland
- Coordinates: 50°15′30″N 21°38′14″E
- Country: Poland
- Voivodeship: Subcarpathian
- County: Kolbuszowa
- Gmina: Niwiska
- Population: 426
- Website: http://www.niwiska.pl/

Hucina [xuˈt͡ɕina] is a village in the administrative district of Gmina Niwiska, within Kolbuszowa County, Subcarpathian Voivodeship, in south-eastern Poland.
