= Leszcze, Podkarpackie Voivodeship =

Leszcze
- Village
- Location within Poland
- Coordinates: 50°10′N 21°40′E
- Country: Poland
- Voivodeship: Subcarpathian
- County: Kolbuszowa
- Gmina: Niwiska
- Population: 274

Leszcze [ˈlɛʂt͡ʂɛ] is a village in the administrative district of Gmina Niwiska, within Kolbuszowa County, Subcarpathian Voivodeship, in south-eastern Poland.
