= Huta Komorowska =

- Village
- Location within Poland
- Coordinates: 50°24′N 21°43′E
- Country: Poland
- Voivodeship: Subcarpathian
- County: Kolbuszowa
- Gmina: Majdan Królewski

Huta Komorowska [ˈxuta kɔmɔˈrɔfska] is a village in the administrative district of Gmina Majdan Królewski, within Kolbuszowa County, Subcarpathian Voivodeship, in south-eastern Poland.

Integral parts of Huta Komorowska
SIMC	Name	Type
0799061	Bór	part of the village
0799078	Dołek	part of the village
0799084	Góra	part of the village
0799090	Gubernia	part of the village
0799109	Kamionka	part of the village
0799115	Krzywica	part of the village
0799121	Obary	part of the village
