= Kosowy =

- Village
- Location within Poland
- Coordinates: 50°16′N 21°38′E
- Country: Poland
- Voivodeship: Subcarpathian
- County: Kolbuszowa
- Gmina: Niwiska
- Population: 844

Kosowy [kɔˈsɔvɨ] is a village in the administrative district of Gmina Niwiska, within Kolbuszowa County, Subcarpathian Voivodeship, in south-eastern Poland.
