= Kłapówka =

- Village
- Location within Poland
- Coordinates: 50°13′N 21°52′E
- Country: Poland
- Voivodeship: Subcarpathian
- County: Kolbuszowa
- Gmina: Kolbuszowa

Kłapówka [kwaˈpufka] is a village in the administrative district of Gmina Kolbuszowa, within Kolbuszowa County, Subcarpathian Voivodeship, in south-eastern Poland.
