= Nowa Wieś, Kolbuszowa County =

Nowa Wieś
- Village
- Location within Poland
- Coordinates: 50°14′12″N 21°43′46″E
- Country: Poland
- Voivodeship: Subcarpathian
- County: Kolbuszowa
- Gmina: Kolbuszowa
- Population: 620

Nowa Wieś [ˈnɔva ˈvjɛɕ] is a village in the administrative district of Gmina Kolbuszowa, within Kolbuszowa County, Subcarpathian Voivodeship, in south-eastern Poland.
