= Ostrowy Baranowskie =

- Village
- Location within Poland
- Coordinates: 50°20′N 21°38′E
- Country: Poland
- Voivodeship: Subcarpathian
- County: Kolbuszowa
- Gmina: Cmolas

Ostrowy Baranowskie [ɔsˈtrɔvɨ baraˈnɔfskʲɛ] is a village in the administrative district of Gmina Cmolas, within Kolbuszowa County, Subcarpathian Voivodeship, in south-eastern Poland.
