= Wilcza Wola, Podkarpackie Voivodeship =

Wilcza Wola, Poland
- Village
- Location within Poland
- Coordinates: 50°21′20″N 21°54′46″E
- Country: Poland
- Voivodeship: Subcarpathian
- County: Kolbuszowa
- Gmina: Dzikowiec
- Population (approx.): 2,000

Wilcza Wola [ˈvilt͡ʂa ˈvɔla] is a village in the administrative district of Gmina Dzikowiec, within Kolbuszowa County, Subcarpathian Voivodeship, in south-eastern Poland.
