= Kolbuszowa Górna =

- Village
- Location within Poland
- Coordinates: 50°14′N 21°48′E
- Country: Poland
- Voivodeship: Subcarpathian
- County: Kolbuszowa
- Gmina: Kolbuszowa
- Population: 1,800

Kolbuszowa Górna [kɔlbuˈʂɔva ˈɡurna] is a village in the administrative district of Gmina Kolbuszowa, within Kolbuszowa County, Subcarpathian Voivodeship, in south-eastern Poland.
