= Domatków =

- Village
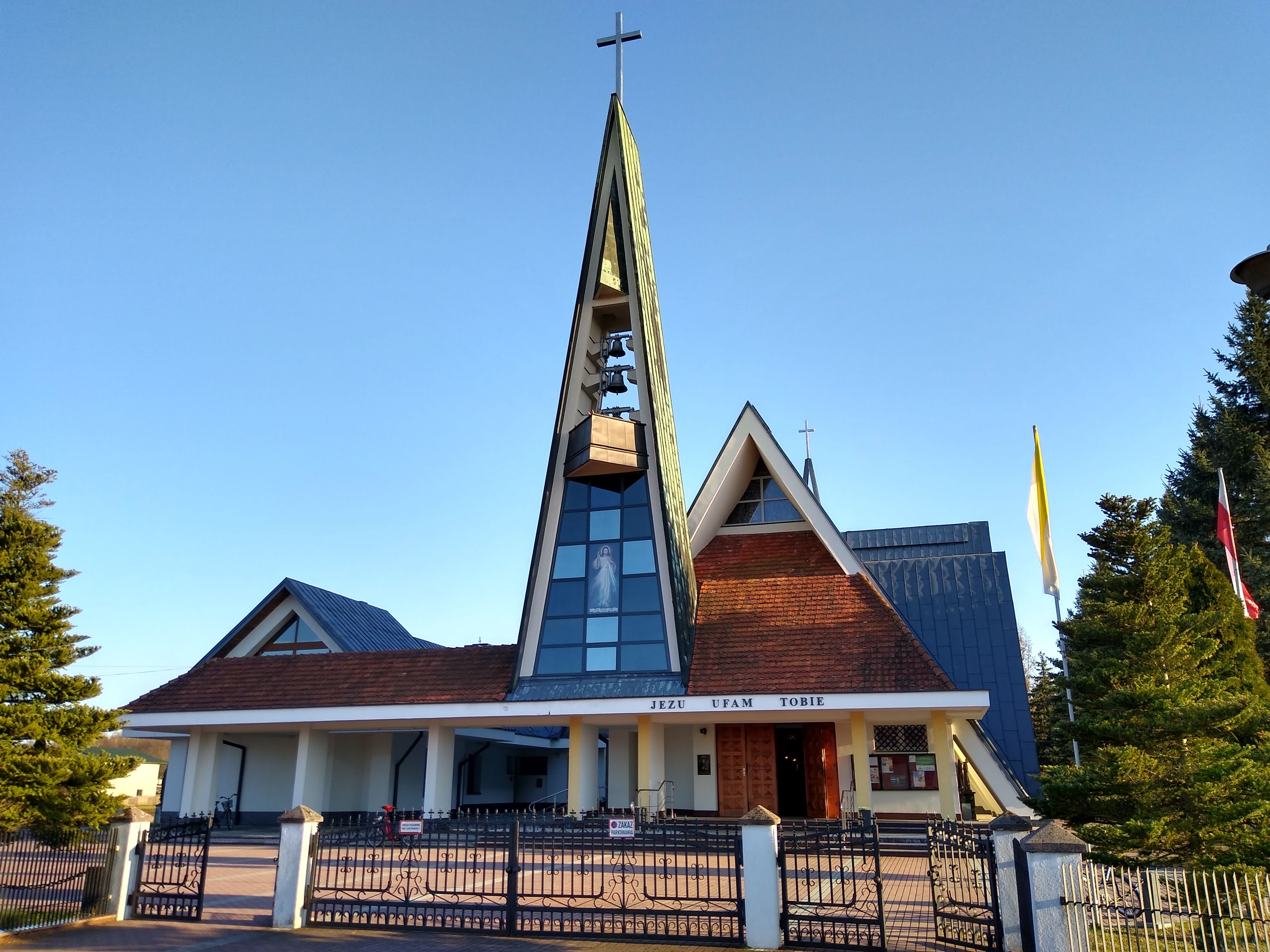
- Divine Mercy church in Domatków

- Location within Poland
- Coordinates: 50°12′N 21°46′E
- Country: Poland
- Voivodeship: Subcarpathian
- County: Kolbuszowa
- Gmina: Kolbuszowa

Population
  - Total: 630
- Time zone: UTC+1 (CET)
  - Summer (DST): UTC+2 (CEST)
- Vehicle registration: RKL

Domatków [dɔˈmatkuf] is a village in the administrative district of Gmina Kolbuszowa, within Kolbuszowa County, Subcarpathian Voivodeship, in south-eastern Poland.

== History ==
The first mention of this town dates back to the 16th century, when Brzezówk was a village/settlement on the edge of the Sandomierz Forest. It was then referred to as Wola Smarkulowska, which was later shortened and named Smarkulów.

In the 18th century, it was one of the few villages with a manorial character in the Kolbuszowa region. At that time, it belonged to the Potocki family, who built a manor house, a fortification, and two granaries there, which at that time operated efficiently in the Kolbuszowa district. Due to the fact that Brzozówka was part of the Potocki estate, who were then the closest officials in the Ropczyce lands, by decision of Count Artur Potocki of Krzeszów, the village was given the addition " Ropczycka " to its name, and it began to be called Brzozówka Ropczycka.

Since 1857, it has been the seat of the unitary commune (single-village) Brzezówka, with a mayor and a council of the Brzezówka village, authorities and a village head.

Five Polish citizens were murdered by Nazi Germany in the village during World War II.
