= Przedbórz, Podkarpackie Voivodeship =

Przedbórz
- Village
- Location within Poland
- Coordinates: 50°10′51″N 21°45′37″E
- Country: Poland
- Voivodeship: Subcarpathian
- County: Kolbuszowa
- Gmina: Kolbuszowa
- Time zone: UTC+1 (CET)
  - Summer (DST): UTC+2 (CEST)

Przedbórz [ˈpʂɛdbuʂ] is a village in the administrative district of Gmina Kolbuszowa, within Kolbuszowa County, Subcarpathian Voivodeship, in south-eastern Poland.

Five Polish citizens were murdered by Nazi Germany in the village during World War II.
