= Ostrowy Tuszowskie =

- Village
- Location within Poland
- Coordinates: 50°18′N 21°39′E
- Country: Poland
- Voivodeship: Subcarpathian
- County: Kolbuszowa
- Gmina: Cmolas
- Population: 930

Ostrowy Tuszowskie [ɔsˈtrɔvɨ tuˈʂɔfskʲɛ] is a village in the administrative district of Gmina Cmolas, within Kolbuszowa County, Subcarpathian Voivodeship, in south-eastern Poland.
