= Nowy Dzikowiec =

- Village
- Interactive map of Nowy Dzikowiec
- Location within Poland
- Coordinates: 50°16′16″N 21°51′46″E
- Country: Poland
- Voivodeship: Subcarpathian
- County: Kolbuszowa
- Gmina: Dzikowiec

Nowy Dzikowiec [ˈnɔvɨ d͡ʑiˈkɔvjɛt͡s] is a village in the administrative district of Gmina Dzikowiec, within Kolbuszowa County, Subcarpathian Voivodeship, in south-eastern Poland.
