= Trzęsówka =

- Village
- Location within Poland
- Coordinates: 50°17′N 21°41′E
- Country: Poland
- Voivodeship: Subcarpathian
- County: Kolbuszowa
- Gmina: Cmolas
- Population: 1,418
- Website: http://www.trzesowka.prv.pl

Trzęsówka [tʂɛ̃ˈsufka] is a village in the administrative district of Gmina Cmolas, within Kolbuszowa County, Subcarpathian Voivodeship, in south-eastern Poland.

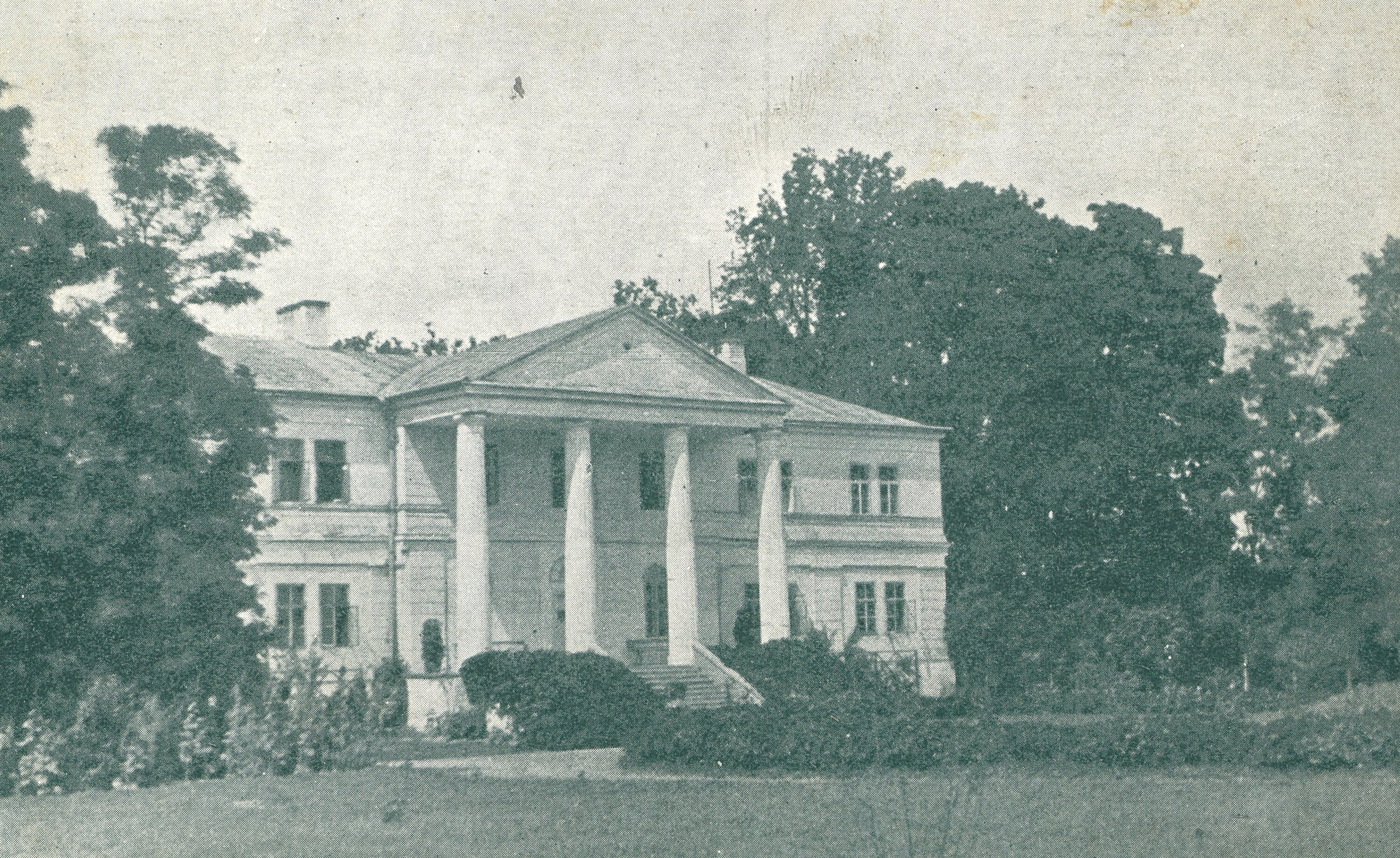
Manor house in Trzęsówka, 1939
