= Poręby Wolskie =

Village in Subcarpathian Voivodeship, Poland

- Village
- Location within Poland
- Coordinates: 50°17′50″N 22°0′36″E
- Country: Poland
- Voivodeship: Subcarpathian
- County: Kolbuszowa
- Gmina: Raniżów
- Population: 328

Poręby Wolskie [pɔˈrɛmbɨ ˈvɔlskʲɛ] is a village in the administrative district of Gmina Raniżów, within Kolbuszowa County, Subcarpathian Voivodeship, in south-eastern Poland.
