= Widełka =

- Village
- Location within Poland
- Coordinates: 50°12′N 21°53′E
- Country: Poland
- Voivodeship: Subcarpathian
- County: Kolbuszowa
- Gmina: Kolbuszowa
- Population: 2,200

Widełka [viˈdɛu̯ka] is a village in the administrative district of Gmina Kolbuszowa, within Kolbuszowa County, Subcarpathian Voivodeship, in south-eastern Poland.

== Location ==
South of Widelka, there is at 50°11'31" N, 21°52'14" E a large substation, at which the only 750kV-powerline in Poland ends.
