= Trześń =

Trześń may refer to the following places:

- Trześń, Kolbuszowa County in Subcarpathian Voivodeship (south-east Poland)
- Trześń, Mielec County in Subcarpathian Voivodeship (south-east Poland)
- Trześń, Tarnobrzeg County in Subcarpathian Voivodeship (south-east Poland)
