= Zielonka, Podkarpackie Voivodeship =

Zielonka
- Village
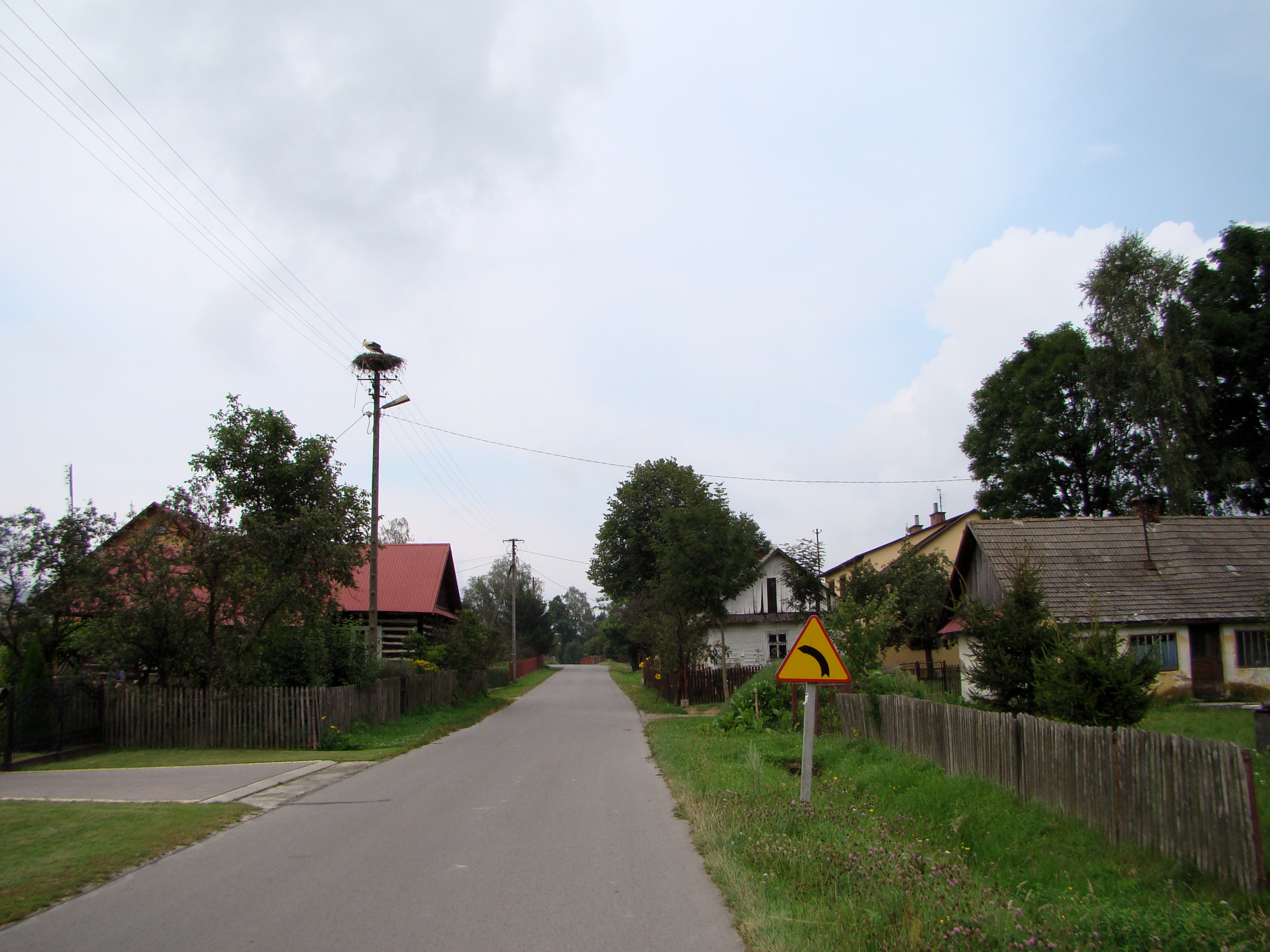
- Road through Zielonka

- Location within Poland
- Coordinates: 50°15′N 22°1′E
- Country: Poland
- Voivodeship: Subcarpathian
- County: Kolbuszowa
- Gmina: Raniżów

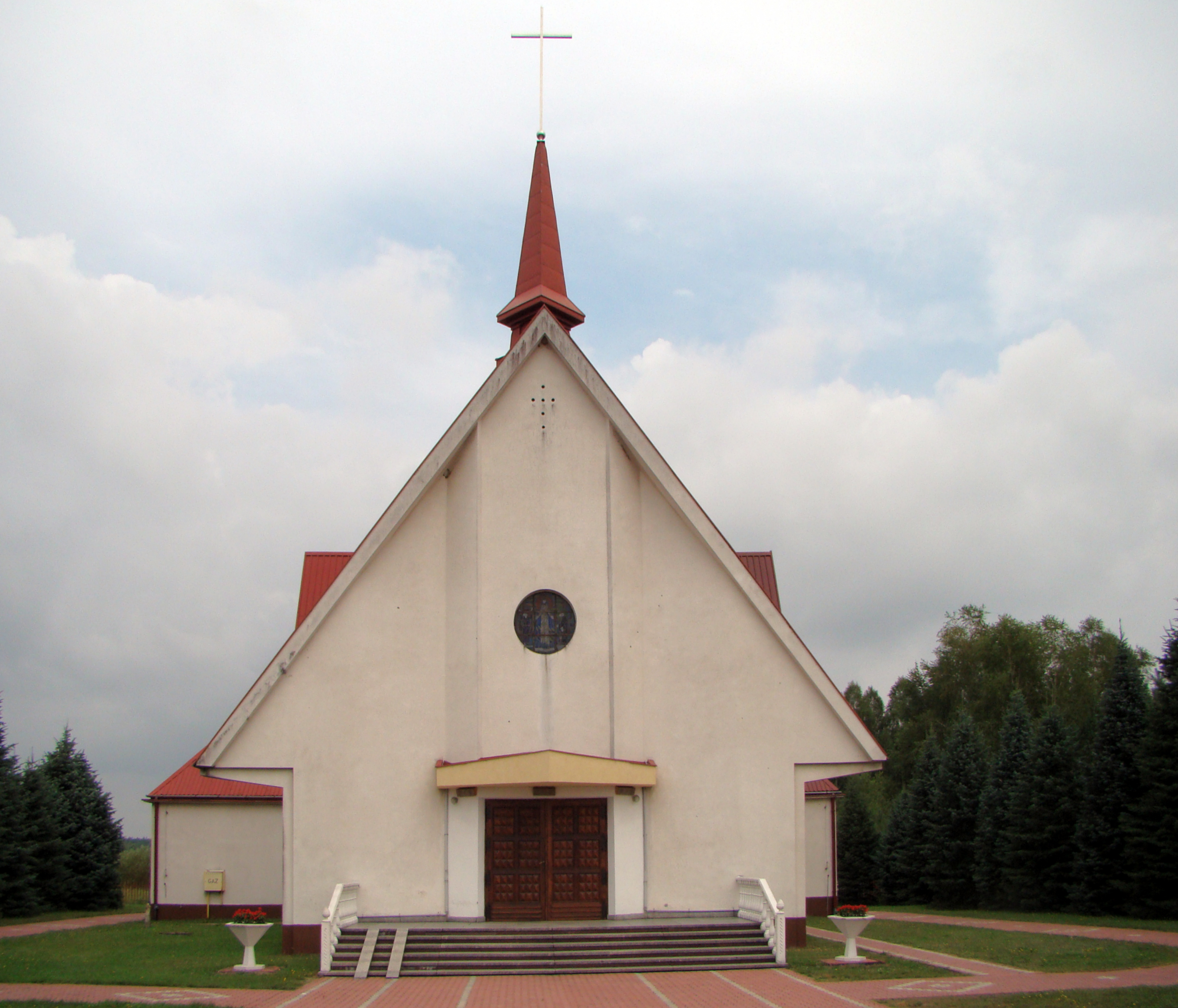
Exaltation of the Holy Cross church in Zielonka

Zielonka [ʑɛˈlɔŋka] is a village in the administrative district of Gmina Raniżów, within Kolbuszowa County, Subcarpathian Voivodeship, in south-eastern Poland.
