= Kolbuszowa Dolna =

- Village
- Location within Poland
- Coordinates: 50°15′N 21°46′E
- Country: Poland
- Voivodeship: Subcarpathian
- County: Kolbuszowa
- Gmina: Kolbuszowa
- Population: 1,800

Kolbuszowa Dolna [kɔlbuˈʂɔva ˈdɔlna] is a village in the administrative district of Gmina Kolbuszowa, within Kolbuszowa County, Subcarpathian Voivodeship, in south-eastern Poland.
