= Kopcie, Podkarpackie Voivodeship =

Kopcie
- Village
- Location within Poland
- Coordinates: 50°20′N 21°51′E
- Country: Poland
- Voivodeship: Subcarpathian
- County: Kolbuszowa
- Gmina: Dzikowiec

Kopcie [ˈkɔpt͡ɕɛ] is a village in the administrative district of Gmina Dzikowiec, within Kolbuszowa County, Subcarpathian Voivodeship, in south-eastern Poland.
