= Lipnica, Podkarpackie Voivodeship =

Lipnica
- Village
- Location within Poland
- Coordinates: 50°17′N 21°53′E
- Country: Poland
- Voivodeship: Subcarpathian
- County: Kolbuszowa
- Gmina: Dzikowiec
- Population: 5,400

Lipnica (Polish pronunciation: [lipˈɲit͡sa]) is a village in the administrative district of Gmina Dzikowiec, within Kolbuszowa County, Subcarpathian Voivodeship, in south-eastern Poland.
