= Posuchy =

- Village
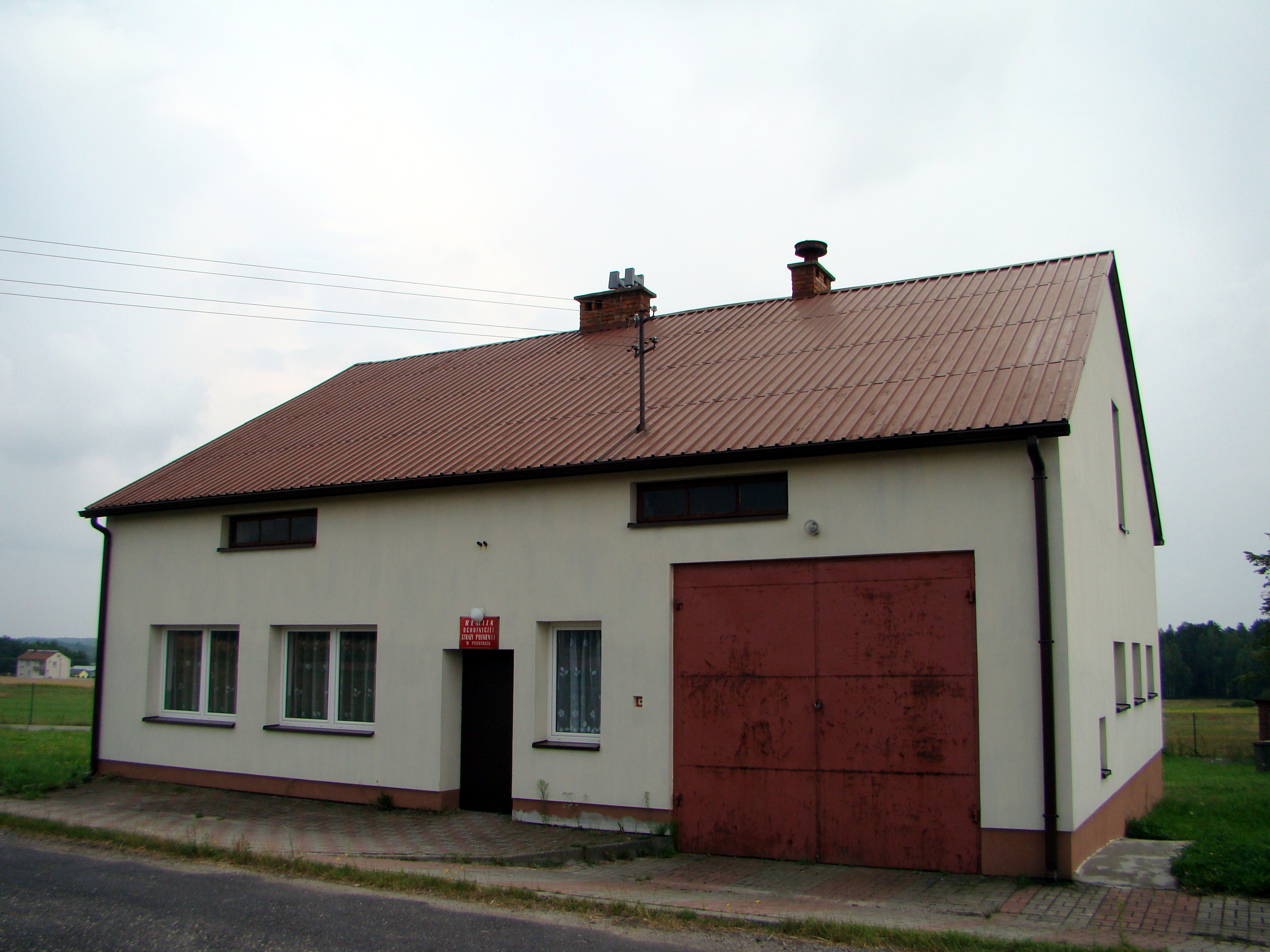
- Fire station of Volunteer Fire Department in Posuchy

- Location within Poland
- Coordinates: 50°17′23″N 22°1′45″E
- Country: Poland
- Voivodeship: Subcarpathian
- County: Kolbuszowa
- Gmina: Raniżów
- Population: 294

Posuchy [pɔˈsuxɨ] is a village in the administrative district of Gmina Raniżów, within Kolbuszowa County, Subcarpathian Voivodeship, in south-eastern Poland.
