= Wola Rusinowska =

- Village
- Location within Poland
- Coordinates: 50°22′N 21°50′E
- Country: Poland
- Voivodeship: Subcarpathian
- County: Kolbuszowa
- Gmina: Majdan Królewski
- Population: 1,013

Wola Rusinowska [ˈvɔla ruɕiˈnɔfska] is a village in the administrative district of Gmina Majdan Królewski, within Kolbuszowa County, Subcarpathian Voivodeship, in south-eastern Poland.
