= Niwiska, Podkarpackie Voivodeship =

Niwiska
- Village
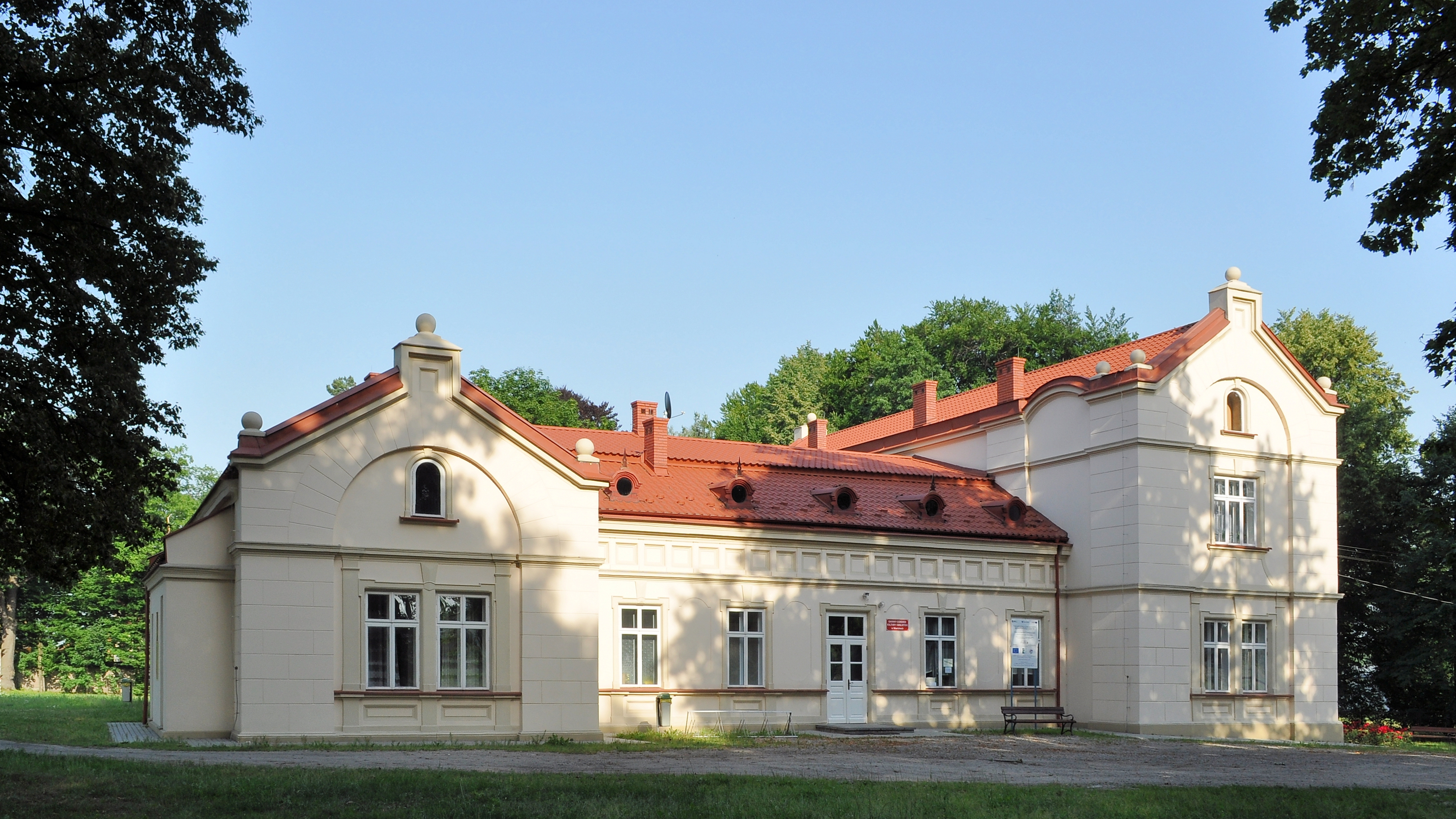
- Jan Hubka manor house

- Location within Poland
- Coordinates: 50°13′N 21°36′E
- Country: Poland
- Voivodeship: Subcarpathian
- County: Kolbuszowa
- Gmina: Niwiska
- Established: 1575
- Area: 23.87 km^{2} (9.22 sq mi)
- Population (2009): 1,560
  - Density: 65.4/km^{2} (169/sq mi)
- Time zone: UTC+1 (CET)
  - Summer (DST): UTC+2 (CEST)
- Postal code: 36-147
- Area code: +48 17
- Car plates: RKL
- Website: http://www.niwiska.pl/

Niwiska [niˈviska] is a village and the seat of the rural gmina (administrative district) of Gmina Niwiska (Niwiska Commune) in Kolbuszowa County, Subcarpathian Voivodeship, in south-eastern Poland.

== Beginnings of the village ==
The village was founded in 1575 by Stanisław Tarnowski. In 1593 Zofia Tarnowska of Mielec founded the first church in Niwiska in thanks for her conversion from arianism. It burned down in 1876. On its ashes a stone and masonry church was built (1880). The first school in Niwiska existed in 1602, and a hospital (for the poor) in 1728. Until 1912 many people were employed at the Niwiska Glass Works.

== World War II ==
During the German occupation residents of Niwiska and surrounding areas were evicted from their homes. Most of the village's buildings were destroyed. Germans evacuated Niwiska and the neighbouring village of Blizna in order to test their experimental V-1 and V-2 missiles there. The seclusion of the area made it a perfect place for such tests. Throughout the war the same seclusion led refugees and partisans to the Niwiska Forest for a place to hide and conduct subversive activities. Fr. Jan Kurek, a chaplain for the local Home Army (Armia Krajowa) together with forester Henryk Augustynowicz, played an instrumental role in the decoding of information found on bits of shrapnel and rockets, which assisted the Allies. After August 3, 1944, the Red Army established there a military hospital and a Soviet airstrip.

== Present day ==
Today, Niwiska has two schools, a civic center, a health clinic, a fire station and a post office. The village covers an area of 23.87 square kilometres (9.22 sq mi), and as of 2009 its total population is 1,560.

== Historic buildings ==
- Manor house from the end of the 19th century, which belonged to Dr. J. Hupka (Secession style wall-paintings from 1909, painted by Karol Frycz; administrator's house, Neo-Gothic granary and park)
- St. Nicholas parish church (1880) – Late-Baroque altar with rococo elements and cemetery chapel (1874)
