= Dzikowiec, Podkarpackie Voivodeship =

Dzikowiec
- Village
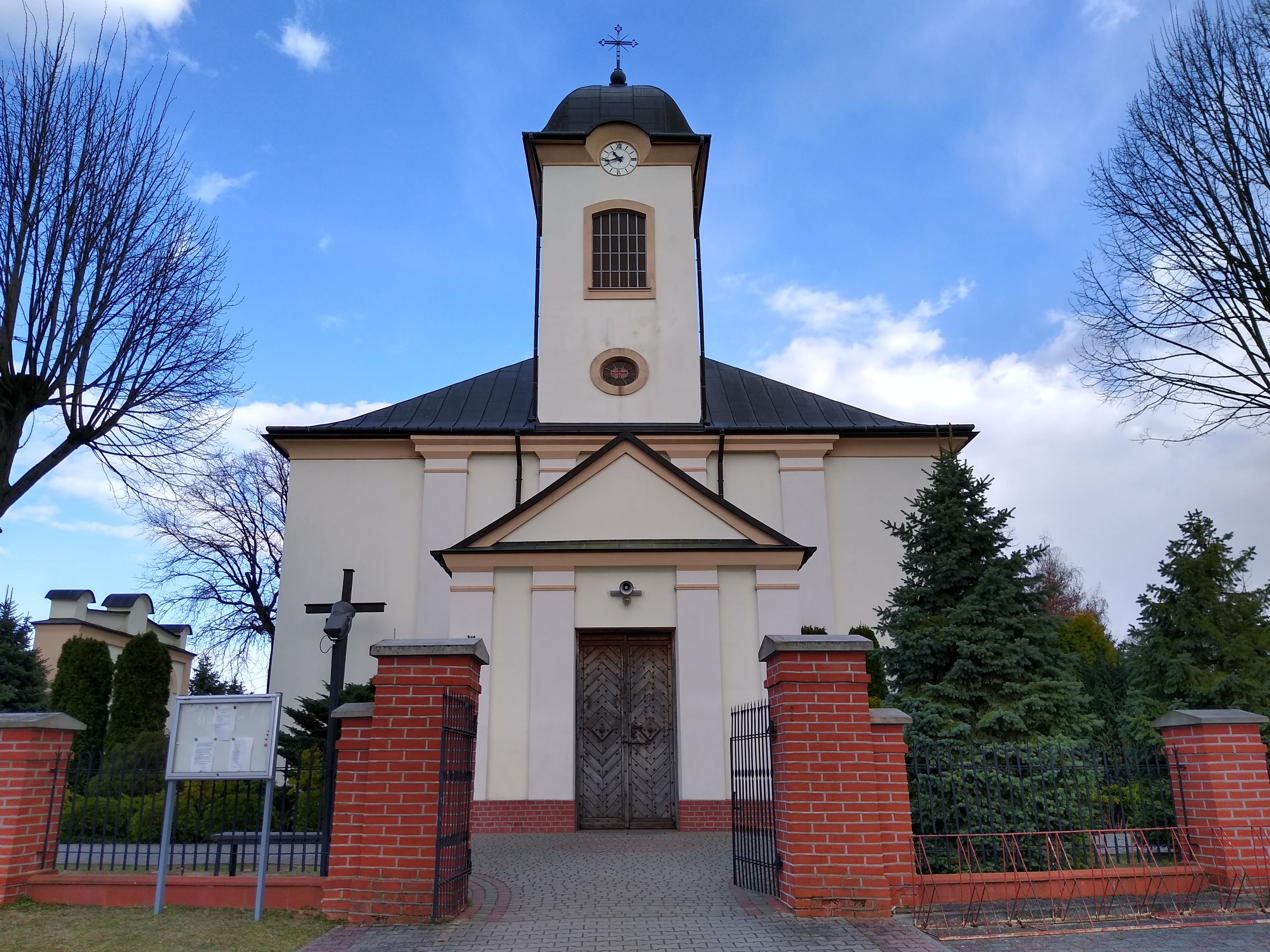
- A church from the early 19th century

- Location within Poland
- Coordinates: 50°17′N 21°51′E
- Country: Poland
- Voivodeship: Subcarpathian
- County: Kolbuszowa
- Gmina: Dzikowiec
- Population: 1,400
- Website: http://www.dzikowiec.itl.pl/ugdzik/

Dzikowiec [d͡ʑiˈkɔvjɛt͡s] is a village in Kolbuszowa County, Subcarpathian Voivodeship, in south-eastern Poland. It is the seat of the gmina (administrative district) called Gmina Dzikowiec.

Until 20 December 1998 the village was named Stary Dzikowiec (Old Dzikowiec), next changed to Dzikowiec

== Notable people ==
- Marian Ciepielowski (1907–1973), Polish physician and scientist
