= Albertirsa =

- Town
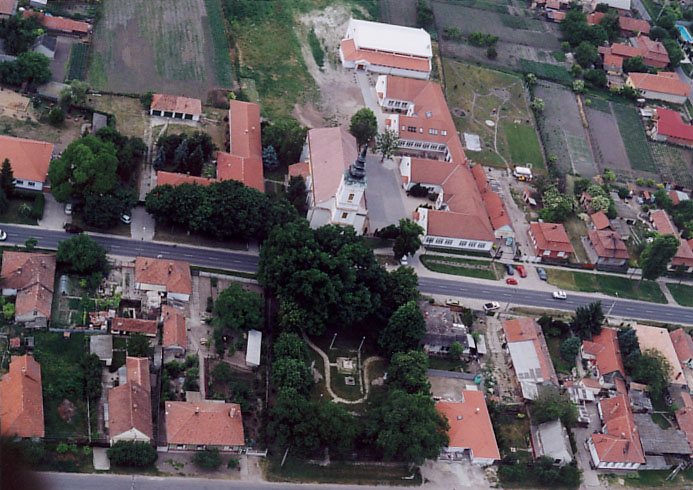

- Flag Coat of arms

- Location within Hungary
- Coordinates: 47°14′24″N 19°36′24″E
- Country: Hungary
- County: Pest
- District: Cegléd

Government
  - Mayor: Kitti Jutasiné Klein (KDNP)

Area
  - Total: 72.96 km^{2} (28.17 sq mi)

Population (1 January 2015)
  - Total: 12,212
  - Density: 167.4/km^{2} (433.5/sq mi)
- Time zone: UTC+1 (CET)
  - Summer (DST): UTC+2 (CEST)
- Postal code: 2730
- Area code: (+36) 53
- Website: www.albertirsa.hu

Albertirsa (formerly Alberti-Irsa, Slovak: Irša) is a town in Ceglédi kistérség, Pest megye, and the middle of the Great Hungarian Plain.

== History ==
Initially Albertirsa was two separate inhabitations: Alberti and Irsa, having joined in 1950.

- 1277: King Ladislaus IV mentions the name of Alberti (as Alberth) tenure in one of his charters
- 1368: The chapter of Buda mentions Irsa (from Slavic *jelsa) as an inhabitation
- 1597: Both villages got emptied after the 1241 Mongol invasion and the Ottoman conquest in the 16th century
- September 29, 1711: Local landlord András Váracskay brings settlers to populate the grassland of Alberti-Irsa. 24 chariots of Upper Hungarian settlers arrive to Alberti
- 1714: Royal endowment letter grants the ownership of Alberti to Márton Szeleczky
- 1719: András Irsay has one third of Irsa of Pest shire
- 1731: Beginning of mandatory lecturing for commons in local landlord funded school
- 1784: Descendants of Márton Szeleczky attain the rights for Alberti to hold markets. This right also grants the market town title.
- September 1, 1847: First train arrives
- 1848: Hundreds joining to the 1848 Revolution after the recruitment speech of Kossuth at Cegléd
- 1924: Civil School of Irsa founded
- September 6, 1950: The two villages Alberti and Irsa are joined under the name of Albertirsa by an ordinance of the Ministry for Home Affairs
- 1979: Inauguration of Hungary's first 750 kV substation south of Albertirsa
- 1995: Gerje-Party Association founded
- 1996: Inauguration of the new flag and symbol during the millennium festival
- July 1, 2003: town status granted to Albertirsa, which has 11547 inhabitants this time

== Notable people ==
- Róza Csillag (1832–1892), female Jewish singer
- Ádám Politzer (1835–1920), a male Jewish otologist
- Barbara Palvin (1993-), a female model

== Points of interest ==
Near Albertirsa, there is the only 750 kV-substation in Hungary. At it, the 750 kV-powerline from Zakhidnoukrainska in Ukraine ends.

- Szeleczky-Szapáry Castle (Hungarian: Szeleczky-Szapáry kastély) named after Szeleczky and Szapáry family
- Synagogue of Irsa
- Albertirsai Strand An outdoor bathing area with many pools for all ages along with small restaurants.

== Twin towns – sister cities ==
Albertirsa is twinned with:

- Gaggiano, Italy (1992)
- Bourg-Saint-Andéol, France (1998)
- Malacky, Slovakia (2000)
- Șimleu Silvaniei, Romania (2004)
- Żnin, Poland (2005)
