= Gmina Niwiska =

Gmina Niwiska Niwiska Commune
- Gmina
- Interactive map of Gmina Niwiska
- Coordinates (Niwiska): 50°13′31″N 21°36′38″E
- Country: Poland
- Voivodeship: Subcarpathian
- County: Kolbuszowa
- Seat: Niwiska

Area
  - Total: 92.60 km^{2} (35.75 sq mi)

Population (2006)
  - Total: 5,780
  - Density: 62.4/km^{2} (162/sq mi)
- Website: http://www.niwiska.pl/

Gmina Niwiska is a rural gmina (administrative district) in Kolbuszowa County, Subcarpathian Voivodeship, in south-eastern Poland. Its seat is the village of Niwiska, which lies approximately 12 kilometres (7 mi) west of Kolbuszowa and 36 km (22 mi) north-west of the regional capital Rzeszów.

The gmina covers an area of 95.192 square kilometres (36.75 sq mi), and as of 2006 its total population is 5,780.

== Villages ==
Gmina Niwiska contains the villages and settlements of Hucina, Hucisko, Kosowy, Leszcze, Niwiska, Przyłęk, Siedlanka, Trześń and Zapole.

== Neighbouring gminas ==
Gmina Niwiska is bordered by the gminas of Cmolas, Kolbuszowa, Mielec, Ostrów, Przecław and Sędziszów Małopolski.
