= Vetrino–Isaccea–Yuzhnoukrainsk powerline =

- Location of places intended to be connected to the powerline

Location
- Country: Bulgaria, Romania, and Ukraine
- General direction: south–north
- From: Vetrino, Bulgaria
- Passes through: Isaccea, Romania
- To: South Ukraine Nuclear Power Plant, Ukraine

Construction information
- Construction started: 1982
- Commissioned: 1988

Technical information
- Type: Overhead transmission line
- Current type: HVAC
- AC voltage: 750 kV/400 kV
- No. of circuits: 1

The Vetrino–Isaccea–Yuzhnoukrainsk powerline was one of three 750 kV powerlines running from Ukraine to the European Union. The power line has mostly been decommissioned, but some former segments continue to operate at 400 kV.

== History ==
An agreement to construct a 750 kV powerline from Ukraine through Romania to Bulgaria, together with the construction of the South Ukraine Nuclear Power Plant, was signed in Moscow in 1982 by the electrical industry ministers of the Soviet Union, Romania, and Bulgaria. Work on the powerline started in 1986 and was completed in 1988.

== Route ==
The powerline started in Bulgaria at Vetrino (Suvorovo) substation near Varna and ran northward. In Dobrudja it crossed the border between Romania and Bulgaria and terminated at Isaccea substation in Romania. From there the line crossed the Danube River, which forms the border between Ukraine and Romania in a 938 metres long span on two 118 metres tall delta pylons situated east of Isaccea and then ran to Pivdennoukrainsk (formerly Yuzhnoukrainsk) substation situated just north of South Ukraine Nuclear Power Plant.

Hereby it crossed the border between Moldova and Ukraine at least four times .However, there was no branch to the power grid in Moldova, although it passed the Vulcăneşti substation.

== Description ==
The towers used were designed to carry a single circuit on a single level. Each conductor consists of a bundle of four wires. Nearly all suspension towers are portal pylons, most of them guyed, though several are free-standing. The free-standing portal pylons support the middle conductor on a V-shaped insulator, while the outer conductors, as in the guyed suspension towers, are supported by standard suspension insulators. For strain towers, triple structures are used; however, a fourth tower is required when there is little or no change in direction to maintain the necessary clearance between the outermost conductor and the tower. Transposition towers are also implemented as monopolar towers, requiring two additional towers.

== Current state ==
The section between Vetrino and Isaccea is since the synchronisation of the Romanian power grid with that of Western Europe, which took after 6 years of trial operation finally take place in 2003 , operated with 400 kV. The section between Isaccea and Pivdennoukrainsk is not in use since the synchronisation of the Romanian power grid with that of Western Europe and is scrapped in most parts.

== Sites ==
| Name | Coordinates |
|---|---|
| Vetrino substation | 43°18′52″N 27°30′25″E |
| Bulgaria–Romania border crossing | 44°0′23.9″N 27°55′7.4″E |
| Transposing tower | 44°35′56.8″N 28°12′16.2″E |
| Transposing tower | 45°12′17.7″N 28°27′43.97″E |
| Isaccea substation | 45°15′16″N 28°27′51.75″E |
| Danube crossing, Tower South | 45°16′5.56″N 28°30′1.37″E |
| Danube crossing, Tower North | 45°16′30.9″N 28°30′25.16″E |
| Southern End of conductors | 45°16′32.4″N 28°31′16.47″E |
| First crossing of border between Ukraine and Moldova | 45°41′5.2″N 28°30′28.02″E |
| Second crossing of border between Ukraine and Moldova | 45°54′42.94″N 28°45′19.3″E |
| Third crossing of border between Ukraine and Moldova | 45°59′4.25″N 28°52′7.71″E |
| Fourth crossing of border between Ukraine and Moldova | 46°5′44.91″N 28°57′17.63″E |
| Fifth crossing of border between Ukraine and Moldova | 45°41′5.2″N 28°30′28.02″E |
| Sixth crossing of border between Ukraine and Moldova | 45°54′42.94″N 28°45′19.3″E |
| Seventh crossing of border between Ukraine and Moldova | 45°59′4.25″N 28°52′7.71″E |
| Eight crossing of border between Ukraine and Moldova | 46°5′44.91″N 28°57′17.63″E |
| Ninth crossing of border between Ukraine and Moldova | 46°26′25.6″N 29°21′49.93″E |
| Tenth crossing of border between Ukraine and Moldova | 46°27′28.14″N 29°25′30.82″E |
| Eleventh crossing of border between Ukraine and Moldova | 46°28′52.2″N 29°30′26.99″E |
| Southern visible end of line | 46°33′7.6″N 29°38′20.9″E |
| Start of intact section | 46°38′55″N 29°45′8.46″E |
| End of intact section | 46°45′21.35″N 29°57′39.77″E |
| Twelfth crossing of border between Ukraine and Moldova | 46°45′34.71″N 29°57′59.55″E |
| Northern visible end of line | 47°45′47.6″N 31°8′12.94″E |
| Northern End of conductors | 47°46′37.08″N 31°11′13.31″E |
| Pivdennoukrainsk substation | 47°49′12″N 31°13′43″E |

== Waypoints Vetrino-Isaccea ==
| Number | Coordinates |
|---|---|
| 1 | 45.2526022°N 28.4670031°E |
| 2 | 45.2406446°N 28.4687519°E |
| 3 | 45.1900901°N 28.4593964°E |
| 4 | 45.1742018°N 28.466692°E |
| 5 | 45.1561679°N 28.462851°E |
| 6 | 45.0989575°N 28.4644389°E |
| 7 | 45.0231361°N 28.363502°E |
| 8 | 44.8963158°N 28.2690883°E |
| 9 | 44.8098676°N 28.2498407°E |
| 10 | 44.8072568°N 28.251493°E |
| 11 | 44.8009157°N 28.247931°E |
| 12 | 44.7306225°N 28.2329106°E |
| 13 | 44.2846442°N 28.1247103°E |
| 14 | 44.2726921°N 28.1241632°E |
| 15 | 44.2619361°N 28.1189919°E |
| 16 | 44.1784338°N 28.0969548°E |
| 17 | 44.1393639°N 28.0764413°E |
| 18 | 44.1380396°N 28.0728149°E |
| 19 | 44.0965082°N 28.0480099°E |
| 20 | 44.0440131°N 28.0011892°E |
| 21 | 44.0060582°N 27.9177618°E |
| 22 | 43.9917648°N 27.9099083°E |
| 23 | 43.9886154°N 27.904501°E |
| 24 | 43.9092558°N 27.864418°E |
| 25 | 43.8506221°N 27.8529811°E |
| 26 | 43.7012646°N 27.7751756°E |
| 27 | 43.4877701°N 27.6283407°E |
| 28 | 43.459601°N 27.6115716°E |
| 29 | 43.455345°N 27.5998825°E |
| 30 | 43.4288866°N 27.578398°E |
| 31 | 43.4127169°N 27.5864339°E |
| 32 | 43.3853277°N 27.5624764°E |
| 33 | 43.366128°N 27.5574607°E |
| 34 | 43.3355417°N 27.5303221°E |
| 35 | 43.3162716°N 27.5166214°E |
| 36 | 43.3151788°N 27.5117183°E |

== Waypoints Isaccea–Yuzhnoukrainsk ==
| Number | Coordinates |
|---|---|
| 1 | 45.2544979°N 28.4682798°E |
| 2 | 45.255087°N 28.4762621°E |
| 3 | 45.265569°N 28.4979129°E |
| 4 | 45.2774987°N 28.5090065°E |
| 5 | 45.2781932°N 28.5106587°E |
| 6 | 45.2750827°N 28.5190058°E |
| 7 | 45.2791897°N 28.533361°E |
| 8 | 45.2891993°N 28.5467291°E |
| 9 | 45.3075834°N 28.5550976°E |
| 10 | 45.3095603°N 28.5531235°E |
| 11 | 45.3244227°N 28.5557628°E |
| 12 | 45.5090236°N 28.5096931°E |
| 13 | 45.5138655°N 28.5125041°E |
| 14 | 45.7012791°N 28.5073757°E |
| 15 | 45.7087566°N 28.493557°E |
| 16 | 45.7390311°N 28.5080409°E |
| 17 | 45.7821001°N 28.5973692°E |
| 18 | 45.7834619°N 28.6018968°E |
| 19 | 45.8620571°N 28.6776853°E |
| 20 | 45.9832608°N 28.8679075°E |
| 21 | 46.0739005°N 28.9291477°E |
| 22 | 46.074481°N 28.9317012°E |
| 23 | 46.1419909°N 29.0106225°E |
| 24 | 46.1432546°N 29.0234542°E |
| 25 | 46.1660635°N 29.0371656°E |
| 26 | 46.4389216°N 29.3593097°E |
| 27 | 46.4965828°N 29.5622241°E |
| 28 | 46.5097647°N 29.6090984°E |
| 29 | 46.5252687°N 29.634912°E |
| 30 | 46.5272913°N 29.6355987°E |
| 31 | 46.5520728°N 29.639225°E |
| 32 | 46.5963827°N 29.650898°E |
| 33 | 46.6087665°N 29.7039413°E |
| 34 | 46.6486113°N 29.7523499°E |
| 35 | 46.6740589°N 29.7946644°E |
| 36 | 46.7065578°N 29.835434°E |
| 37 | 46.7268523°N 29.9347615°E |
| 38 | 46.7559089°N 29.9610901°E |
| 39 | 46.7568792°N 29.9631929°E |
| 40 | 46.7623181°N 29.9697375°E |
| 41 | 46.793596°N 29.94681°E |
| 42 | 46.8037021°N 29.9667549°E |
| 43 | 46.8192175°N 29.9981475°E |
| 44 | 46.8467495°N 30.019058°E |
| 45 | 46.9040764°N 30.0239933°E |
| 46 | 46.9599362°N 30.0122023°E |
| 47 | 47.0104598°N 30.0424576°E |
| 48 | 47.0122155°N 30.0558794°E |
| 49 | 47.0259081°N 30.0797081°E |
| 50 | 47.0695445°N 30.1054037°E |
| 51 | 47.122359°N 30.1691437°E |
| 52 | 47.1303011°N 30.2321434°E |
| 53 | 47.1437299°N 30.2591801°E |
| 54 | 47.1522525°N 30.3255272°E |
| 55 | 47.1828293°N 30.3579712°E |
| 56 | 47.1932995°N 30.4279232°E |
| 57 | 47.2483582°N 30.4590368°E |
| 58 | 47.360528°N 30.6069446°E |
| 59 | 47.3690444°N 30.6569194°E |
| 60 | 47.5008°N 30.8564111°E |
| 61 | 47.513603°N 30.9388787°E |
| 62 | 47.5233167°N 31.0023222°E |
| 63 | 47.5324149°N 31.0531139°E |
| 64 | 47.5685347°N 31.0919738°E |
| 65 | 47.6556321°N 31.0965228°E |
| 66 | 47.6953361°N 31.1075417°E |
| 67 | 47.6990615°N 31.1401248°E |
| 68 | 47.7358094°N 31.1382794°E |
| 69 | 47.7632146°N 31.1369705°E |
| 70 | 47.779738°N 31.1977494°E |
| 71 | 47.7919604°N 31.2191319°E |
| 72 | 47.7953624°N 31.2413621°E |
| 73 | 47.8071669°N 31.2479925°E |
| 74 | 47.8227146°N 31.2474668°E |
| 75 | 47.8225345°N 31.2323606°E |
| 76 | 47.8218934°N 31.231631°E |

== See also ==
- Albertirsa–Zakhidnoukrainska–Vinnytsia powerline
- Rzeszów–Khmelnytskyi powerline
