= Gmina Cmolas =

Gmina Cmolas Cmolas Commune
- Gmina
- Flag Coat of arms
- Interactive map of Gmina Cmolas
- Coordinates (Cmolas): 50°18′N 21°45′E
- Country: Poland
- Voivodeship: Subcarpathian
- County: Kolbuszowa
- Seat: Cmolas

Area
  - Total: 136.6 km^{2} (52.7 sq mi)
- Website: http://www.cmolas.pl/

Gmina Cmolas is a rural gmina (administrative district) in Kolbuszowa County, Subcarpathian Voivodeship, in south-eastern Poland. Its seat is the village of Cmolas, which lies approximately 6 kilometres (4 mi) north of Kolbuszowa and 35 km (22 mi) north-west of the regional capital Rzeszów.

The gmina covers an area of 134.06 square kilometres (51.8 sq mi), and as of 2006 its total population is 7,874.

== Villages ==
Gmina Cmolas contains the villages and settlements of Cmolas, Hadykówka, Jagodnik, Ostrowy Baranowskie, Ostrowy Tuszowskie, Poręby Dymarskie, Toporów and Trzęsówka.

== Neighbouring gminas ==
Gmina Cmolas is bordered by The Gminas of Baranów Sandomierski, Dzikowiec, Kolbuszowa, Majdan Królewski, Mielec, Niwiska and Tuszów Narodowy.
