= Albertirsa–Zakhidnoukrainska–Vinnytsia powerline =

Overhead power line between Ukraine and Hungary

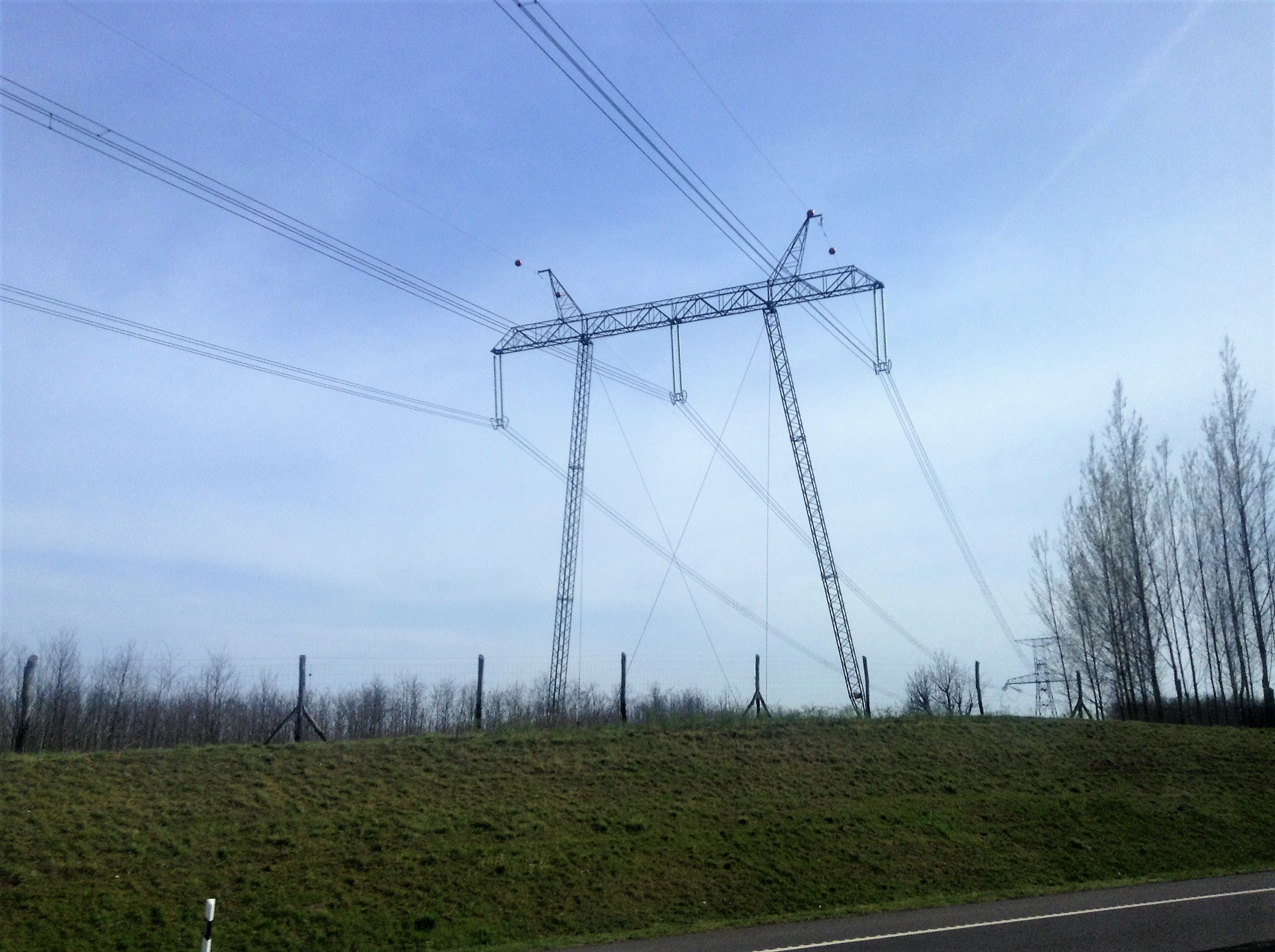

Location
- Coordinates: 47°13′28″N 19°34′48″E; 48°15′6″N 22°22′00″E; 49°23′11″N 24°14′57″E; 49°09′54″N 28°43′23″E

The Albertirsa–Zakhidnoukrainska–Vinnytsia powerline is a power transmission line between Ukraine and Hungary. It is a part of the former "Mir" transmission system between the Soviet Union and Comecon countries. As of today, it is the only 750 kV-powerline in Hungary and one of the few powerlines operated with this voltage in the European Union.

== History ==
On 28 February 1974, the USSR, Bulgaria, Hungary, GDR, Poland and Czechoslovakia signed a cooperation agreement on construction of the 750 kV-line between Vinnytsia and Albertirsa, and substations Vinnytsia, Zakhidnoukrainska and Albertirsa. Construction started in 1975 and it went in service in 1979.

Since the synchronization of the power grid of Hungary with that of the synchronous grid of Continental Europe (ENTSO-E) and because of economic reasons, the powerline went out of service in 1993, but was put in service again in 2002 after some new equipment was installed.

== Technical description ==
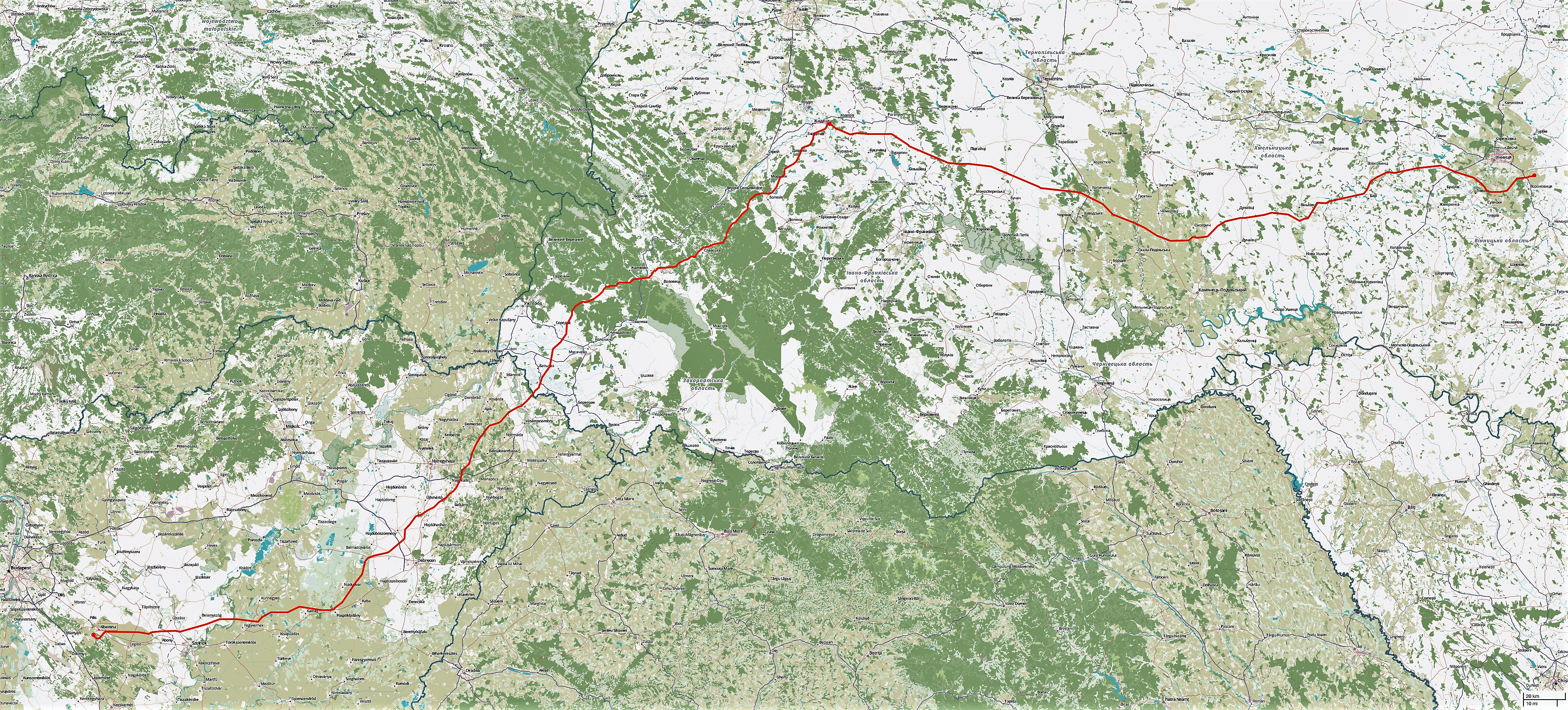
Location map

The 479-kilometre (298 mi) long power line connects the substation of Albertirsa in Hungary with Zakhidnoukrainska substation, which is situated between Zhydachiv and Khodoriv in Ukraine. From there it runs further east to Vinnytsia substation, which is located in Vinnytsia Raion (southeast of the city of Vinnytsia).

Portal pylons are used as suspension pylons. These are free-standing structures in areas, which are sometimes flooded and guyed ones in areas without flood-danger. As anchor pylons towers with one crossbar are used whereby the conductor is led around the pylon structure. The powerline was designed for the transmission of 2,000 MW electricity.

== See also ==
- Rzeszów–Khmelnytskyi powerline
- Vetrino–Isaccea–Yuzhnoukrainsk powerline
