= Gmina Majdan Królewski =

Gmina Majdan Królewski Majdan Królewski Commune
- Gmina
- Coat of arms
- Interactive map of Gmina Majdan Królewski
- Coordinates (Majdan Królewski): 50°23′0″N 21°45′0″E
- Country: Poland
- Voivodeship: Subcarpathian
- County: Kolbuszowa
- Seat: Majdan Królewski

Area
  - Total: 155.8 km^{2} (60.2 sq mi)

Population (2006)
  - Total: 9,634
  - Density: 61.84/km^{2} (160.2/sq mi)
- Website: http://www.majdankrolewski.pl

Gmina Majdan Królewski is a rural gmina (administrative district) in Kolbuszowa County, Subcarpathian Voivodeship, in southeastern Poland. Its seat is the village of Majdan Królewski, which lies approximately 15 kilometres (9 mi) north of Kolbuszowa and 43 km (27 mi) north-west of the regional capital Rzeszów.

The gmina covers an area of 155.8 square kilometres (60.2 sq mi), and as of 2006 its total population is 9,634.

== Villages ==
Gmina Majdan Królewski contains the villages and settlements of Brzostowa Góra, Huta Komorowska, Komorów, Krzątka, Majdan Królewski, Stary Rusinów and Wola Rusinowska.

== Neighbouring gminas ==
Gmina Majdan Królewski is bordered by the gminas of Baranów Sandomierski, Bojanów, Cmolas, Dzikowiec and Nowa Dęba.
