= Rzeszów–Khmelnytskyi powerline =

Electrical power transmission line

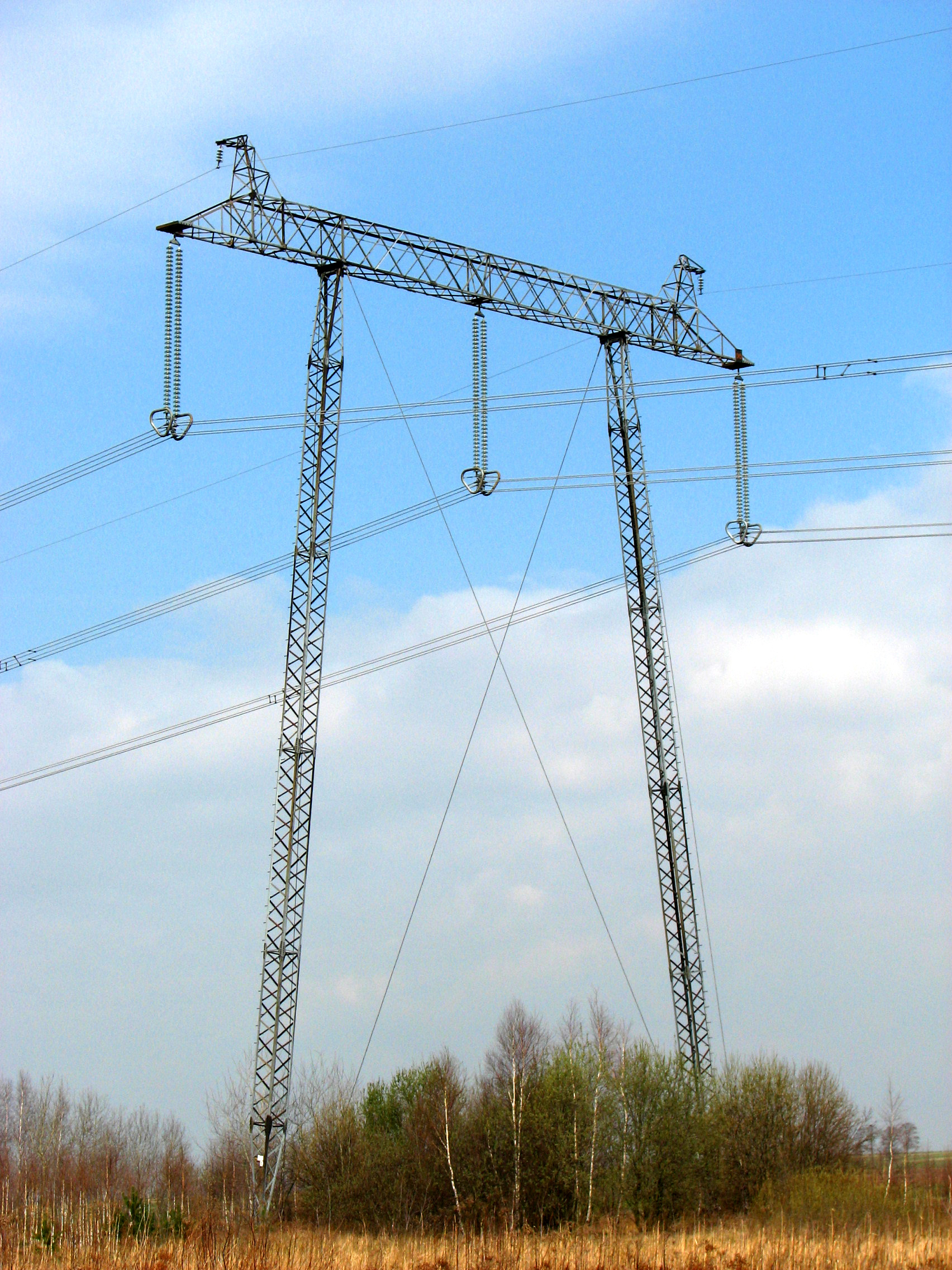
- pole-through 750 kV line from the Ukrainian nuclear power plant Khmelnitsky station 750/400 kV Widełka near Kolbuszowa. The photograph was taken near the intersection line with the national road DK19 in Nienadówce, at its border with Stobierna and Medynia Głogowska.

Location
- Country: Poland, Ukraine
- General direction: west–east
- From: Widełka substation, Poland 50°11′49″N 21°52′19″E
- Passes through: Border between Poland and Ukraine 50°6′2″N 23°17′28.2″E
- To: Khmelnytskyi Nuclear Power Plant 50°18′5.06″N 26°38′59.10″E

Construction information
- Commissioned: 1985

Technical information
- Type: Overhead transmission line
- Current type: AC
- Total length: 395 km (245 mi)
- AC voltage: 750 kV, currently operating at 400 kV
- No. of circuits: 1

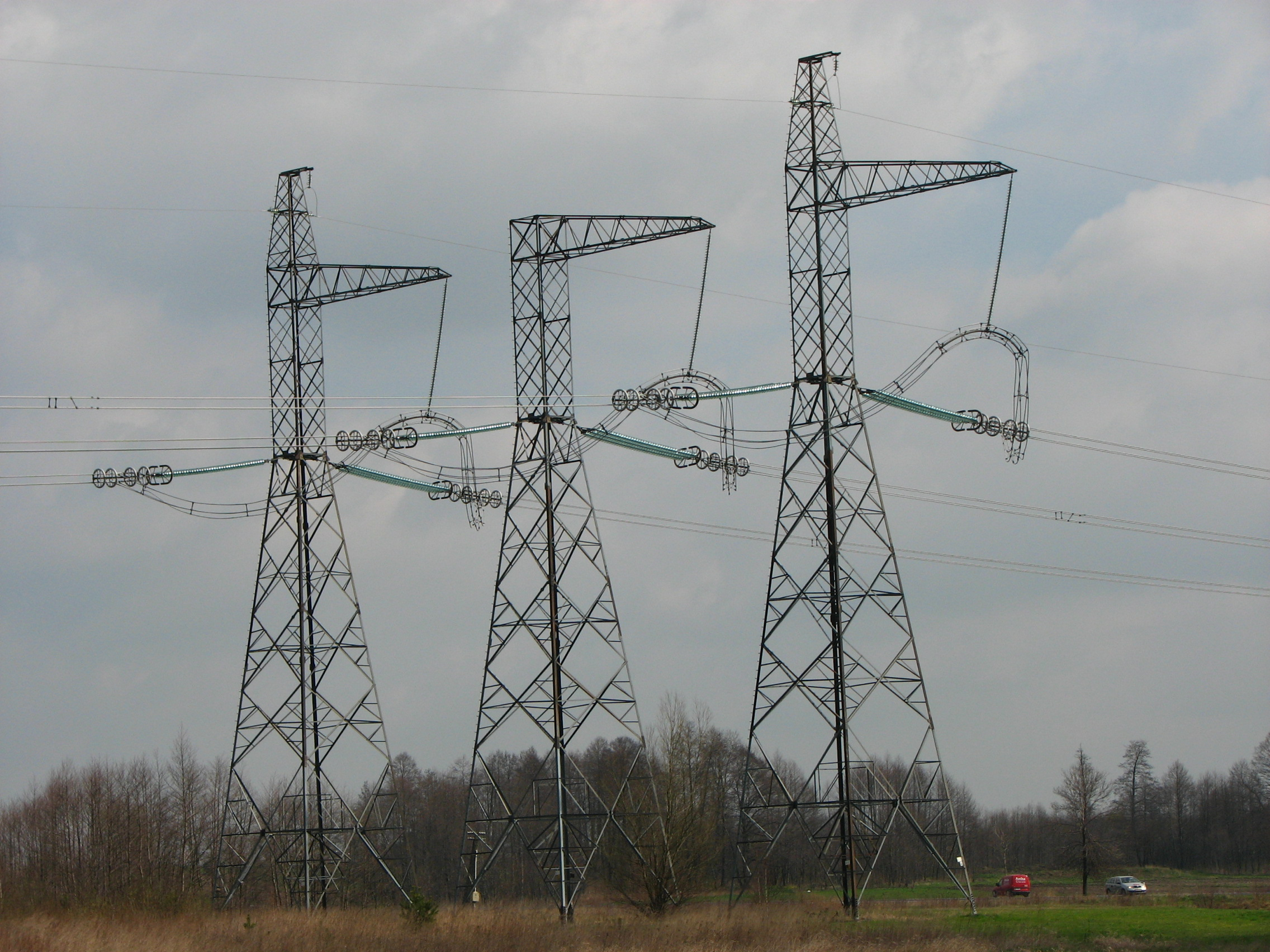
powerline strainers

The Rzeszów–Khmelnytskyi powerline is an electrical power transmission line between Ukraine and Poland. It is the only 750 kV-powerline in Poland, and one of a few in the European Union.

== History ==
The decision to build this powerline was made in 1977 and it went in operation in 1985. The line went out of service after Poland joined the synchronous grid of Continental Europe (UCTE). However, there was a plan to re-activate this line after 2010 by constructing a back-to-back conversion station on the Polish end of the line, but this was not implemented.

In 2016 Energoatom announced it was considering disconnecting unit 2 of the Khmelnytskyi Nuclear Power Plant from the Ukrainian power grid and using the powerline to connect to the Burshtyn TES energy island which operates on the European power grid, to facilitate exports to Poland and Hungary. In 2019 the Ministry of Energy created a consortium, Ukraine Power Bridge Company Limited, to progress the project, but as of 2020 the project was not agreed. In 2022 Ukraine's grid had synchronised with the European grid and restoration work on the line began. As of 2023, it is operational at 400 kV.

== Technical description ==
It has a length of 395 kilometres (245 mi), of which 281 km (175 mi) in Ukraine and 114 km (71 mi) in Poland. It runs from Widełka substation near Rzeszów in Poland to Khmelnytskyi Nuclear Power Plant in Ukraine. It is an AC line and has a single circuit. It can transfer a maximum power of 1300 MVA.

As guyed portal pylons are used, strainers are from special design. They consist of three free-standing lattice towers each carrying one conductor. Each strainer tower has a crossbar at which the conductor is led around the structure on a huge insulator.

The line crosses at 50°3′24″N 25°22′5″E the 750 kV powerline from Zakhidnoukrainska Substation to Rivne Nuclear Power Plant, which may be the only crossing of two 750 kV powerlines in Europe.

== See also ==
- Albertirsa–Zakhidnoukrainska–Vinnytsia powerline
- Vetrino–Isaccea–Yuzhnoukrainsk powerline
