= Gmina Dzikowiec =

Gmina Dzikowiec Dzikowiec Commune
- Gmina
- Coat of arms
- Interactive map of Gmina Dzikowiec
- Coordinates (Dzikowiec): 50°17′N 21°51′E
- Country: Poland
- Voivodeship: Subcarpathian
- County: Kolbuszowa
- Seat: Dzikowiec

Area
  - Total: 121.66 km^{2} (46.97 sq mi)

Population (2006)
  - Total: 6,440
  - Density: 52.9/km^{2} (137/sq mi)

Gmina Dzikowiec is a rural gmina (administrative district) in Kolbuszowa County, Subcarpathian Voivodeship, in south-eastern Poland. Its seat is the village of Dzikowiec, which lies approximately 7 kilometres (4 mi) north-east of Kolbuszowa and 30 km (19 mi) north of the regional capital Rzeszów.

The gmina covers an area of 121.66 square kilometres (47.0 sq mi), and as of 2006 its total population is 6,440.

== Villages ==
Gmina Dzikowiec contains the villages and settlements of Dzikowiec, Kopcie, Lipnica, Mechowiec, Nowy Dzikowiec, Osia Góra, Płazówka and Wilcza Wola.

== Neighbouring gminas ==
Gmina Dzikowiec is bordered by the gminas of Bojanów, Cmolas, Jeżowe, Kolbuszowa, Majdan Królewski and Raniżów.
