= Bukowiec, Kolbuszowa County =

Bukowiec
- Village
- Location within Poland
- Coordinates: 50°11′N 21°47′E
- Country: Poland
- Voivodeship: Subcarpathian
- Gmina: Kolbuszowa

Bukowiec is a village in the administrative district of Gmina Kolbuszowa, in south-eastern Poland.
