= Gmina Raniżów =

Gmina Raniżów Raniżów Commune
- Gmina
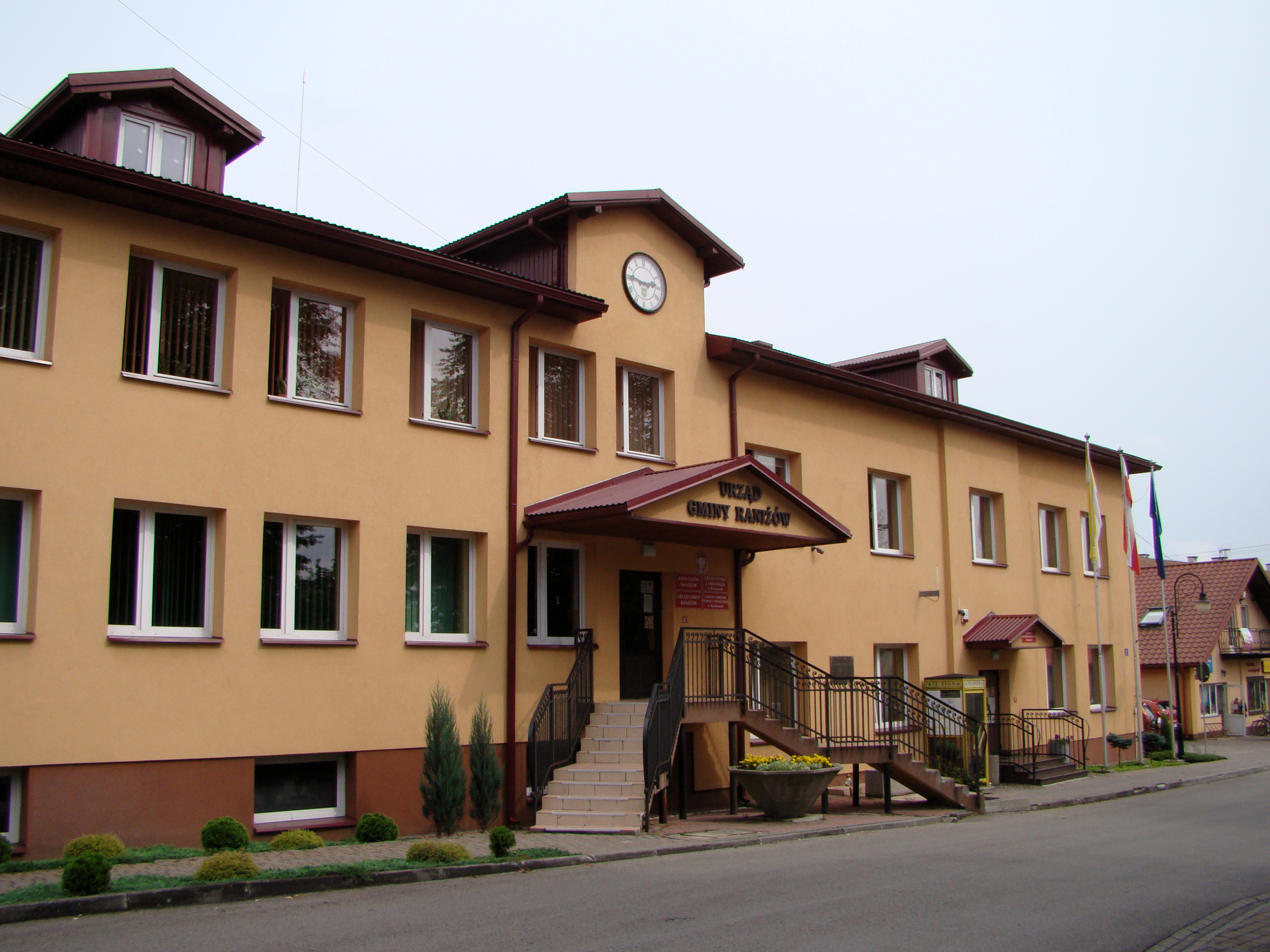
- Gmina Raniżów Office

- Coat of arms
- Interactive map of Gmina Raniżów
- Coordinates (Raniżów): 50°16′N 21°59′E
- Country: Poland
- Voivodeship: Subcarpathian
- County: Kolbuszowa
- Seat: Raniżów

Area
  - Total: 96.77 km^{2} (37.36 sq mi)

Population (2006)
  - Total: 7,185
  - Density: 74.25/km^{2} (192.3/sq mi)
- Website: http://www.ranizow.pl/

Gmina Raniżów is a rural gmina (administrative district) in Kolbuszowa County, Subcarpathian Voivodeship, in south-eastern Poland. Its seat is the village of Raniżów, which lies approximately 16 kilometres (10 mi) east of Kolbuszowa and 26 km (16 mi) north of the regional capital Rzeszów.

The gmina covers an area of 96.77 square kilometres (37.4 sq mi), and as of 2006 its total population is 7,185.

== Villages ==
Gmina Raniżów contains the villages and settlements of Korczowiska, Mazury, Poręby Wolskie, Posuchy, Raniżów, Staniszewskie, Wola Raniżowska and Zielonka.

== Neighbouring gminas ==
Gmina Raniżów is bordered by the gminas of Dzikowiec, Głogów Małopolski, Jeżowe, Kamień, Kolbuszowa and Sokołów Małopolski.
