= Hucisko, Kolbuszowa County =

Hucisko
- Village
- Location within Poland
- Coordinates: 50°12′N 21°40′E
- Country: Poland
- Voivodeship: Subcarpathian
- County: Kolbuszowa
- Gmina: Niwiska
- Established: 17th century
- Area: 7.9106 km^{2} (3.0543 sq mi)
- Population (2007): 454
  - Density: 57.4/km^{2} (149/sq mi)
- Time zone: UTC+1 (CET)
  - Summer (DST): UTC+2 (CEST)
- Postal code: 36-147
- Area code: +48 17
- Car plates: RKL

Hucisko [xuˈt͡ɕiskɔ] is a village in the administrative district of Gmina Niwiska, within Kolbuszowa County, Subcarpathian Voivodeship, in south-eastern Poland.
