= Majdan Królewski =

- Village
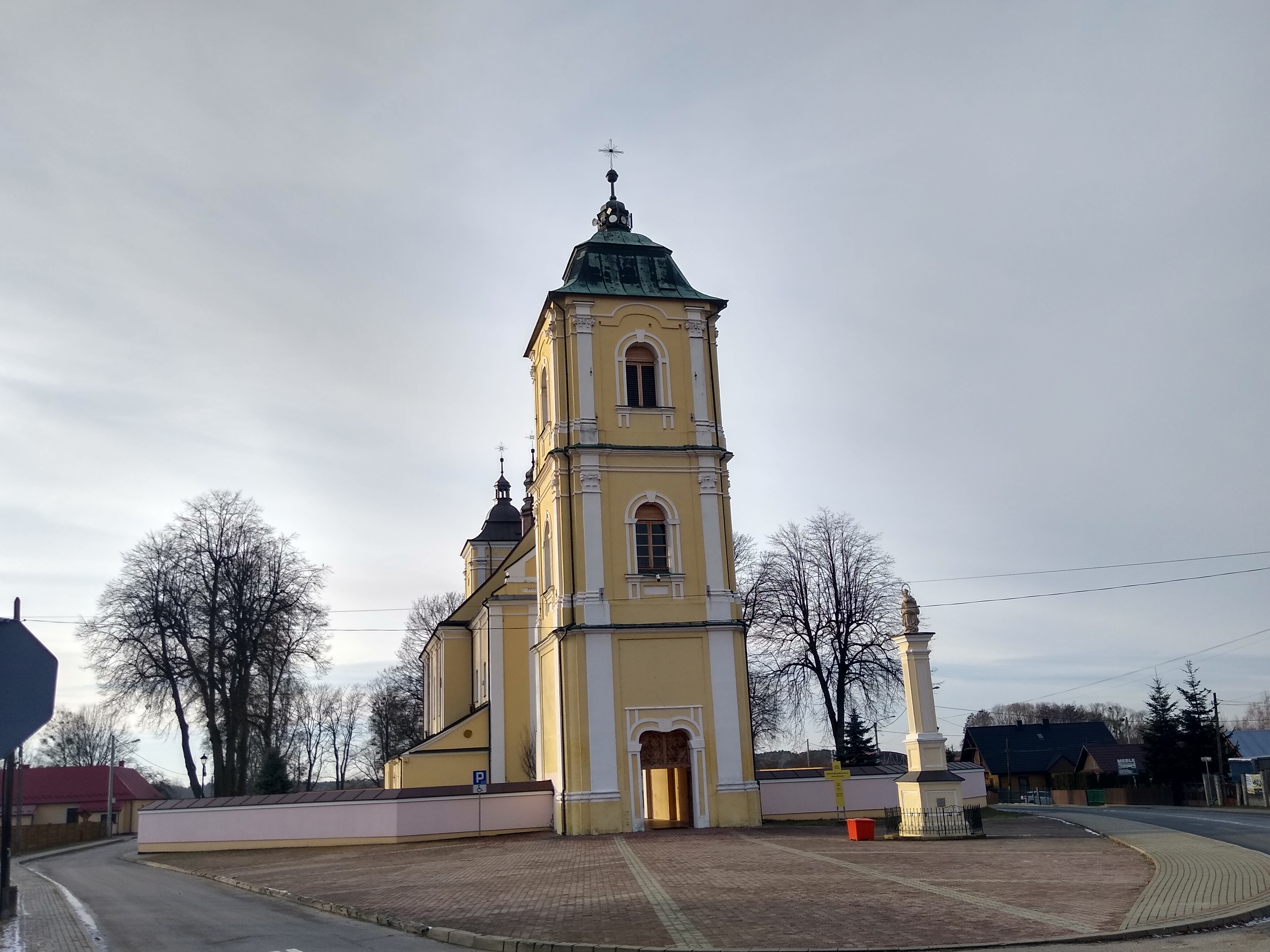
- Church from the late 18th century

- Coat of arms

- Location within Poland
- Coordinates: 50°23′N 21°45′E
- Country: Poland
- Voivodeship: Subcarpathian
- County: Kolbuszowa
- Gmina: Majdan Królewski
- Population: 2,671

Majdan Królewski (Polish pronunciation: [ˈmajdan kruˈlɛfskʲi]) is a village in Kolbuszowa County, Subcarpathian Voivodeship, in south-eastern Poland. It is the seat of the gmina (administrative district) called Gmina Majdan Królewski.

== Names ==
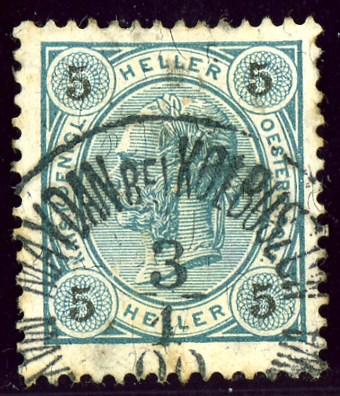
Both names on an Austrian KK stamp in 1900

In 1900, those names were in use: MAYDAN BEI KOLBUSZOW (German) and MAYDAN KOLO KOLBUSCHOWA.
