= Gmina Kolbuszowa =

Gmina Kolbuszowa Kolbuszowa Commune
- Gmina
- Flag Coat of arms

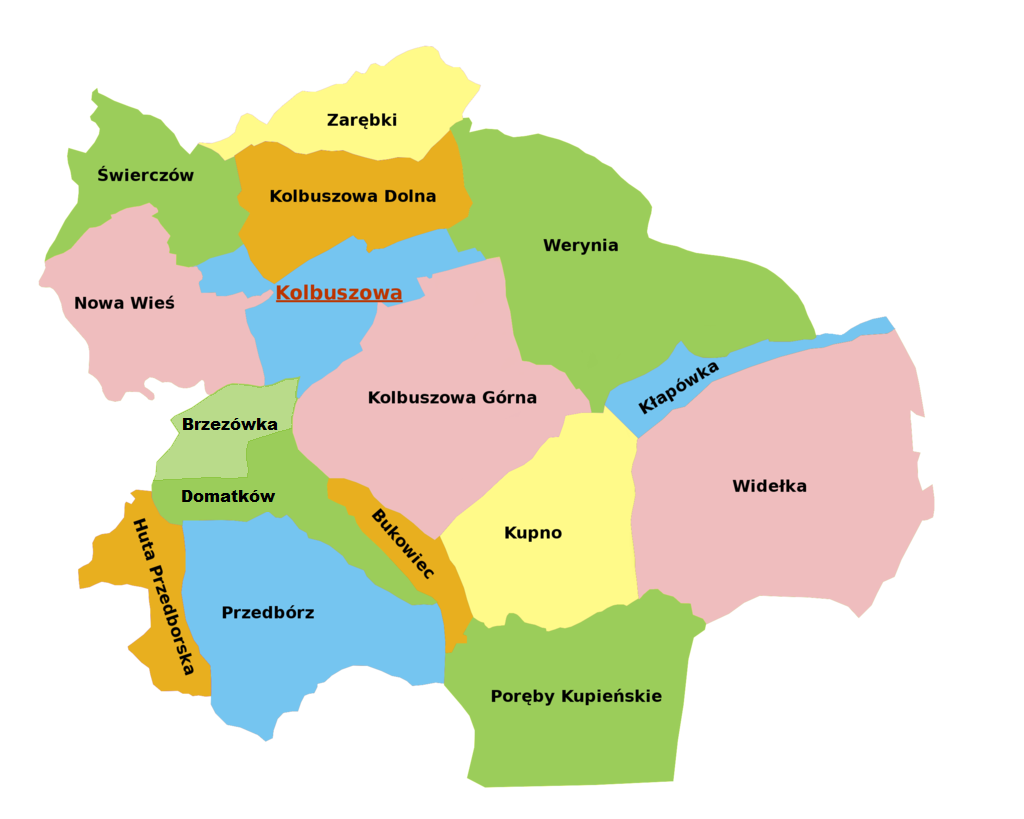
- Coordinates (Kolbuszowa): 50°15′N 21°46′E
- Country: Poland
- Voivodeship: Subcarpathian
- County: Kolbuszowa
- Seat: Kolbuszowa

Area
  - Total: 170.59 km^{2} (65.87 sq mi)

Population (2006)
  - Total: 24,486
  - Density: 143.54/km^{2} (371.76/sq mi)
  - Urban: 9,172
  - Rural: 15,314
- Website: http://www.kolbuszowa.pl/

Gmina Kolbuszowa is an urban-rural gmina (administrative district) in Kolbuszowa County, Subcarpathian Voivodeship, in south-eastern Poland. Its seat is the town of Kolbuszowa, which lies approximately 30 kilometres (19 mi) north-west of the regional capital Rzeszów.

The gmina covers an area of 170.59 square kilometres (65.9 sq mi), and as of 2006 its total population is 24,486 (out of which the population of Kolbuszowa amounts to 9,172, and the population of the rural part of the gmina is 15,314).

== Villages ==
Apart from the town of Kolbuszowa, Gmina Kolbuszowa contains the villages and settlements of Brzezówka, Bukowiec, Domatków, Huta Przedborska, Kłapówka, Kolbuszowa Dolna, Kolbuszowa Górna, Kupno, Nowa Wieś, Poręby Kupieńskie, Przedbórz, Świerczów, Werynia, Widełka and Zarębki.

== Neighbouring gminas ==
Gmina Kolbuszowa is bordered by the gminas of Cmolas, Dzikowiec, Głogów Małopolski, Niwiska, Raniżów, Sędziszów Małopolski and Świlcza.
