= Marian Ciepielowski =

Polish physician and scientist (1907–1973)

Marian Ciepielowski (30 August 1907 – 1 February 1973) was a Polish physician and scientist. A survivor of the Buchenwald concentration camp, he is best known for his activity as a saboteur within the camp's vaccine production unit. Ciepielowski's actions resulted in useful vaccines being distributed to camp inmates, while inactive and useless "vaccines" were sent to Nazi soldiers. After the war he emigrated to the United States.

== Before the war ==
Ciepielowski was born on 30 August 1907 to a Polish Catholic family in Dzikowiec. He attended a school in Tarnowskie Góry and then went to study medicine in Kraków, graduating in 1934 from the Jagiellonian University Medical College. He was active in the Bratnia Pomoc student organization. Specializing in infectious diseases, after graduation, he worked at various places including Kraków's Department of Microbiology and Serology and a social insurance company.

== Wartime activities ==
Ciepielowski, who already considered himself a socialist at university, joined the Polish defense against the Nazi invasion in September 1939. After a brief internment in the USSR, he returned to Poland and joined the clandestine resistance. He was arrested by the Gestapo in April 1941 and convicted based on vague accusations of anti-German activities. He was imprisoned at Montelupich Prison before being sent to Buchenwald.

== Sabotage at Buchenwald ==
For the first part of Ciepielowski's time at Buchenwald, he was set to hard labor. During this part of his imprisonment, he suffered a broken shoulder and serious injuries to his hand as a result of an amateur surgery, and as a result of his privations he wasted away to a weight of 46 kg.

By late 1942, German forces were taking significant losses from typhus, particularly on the Russian front. Joachim Mrugowsky, head of the Waffen-SS's Hygiene Institute, had plans to produce a vaccine, but these plans were delayed by the bombing of his headquarters. Mrugowsky instead decided that the vaccine would be produced at Buchenwald, which was judged to be at lower risk of Allied bombing. One of the camp's SS officers, the surgeon Erwin Ding-Schuler, needing researchers to staff his vaccine laboratory, pulled Ciepielowski to assist. Ciepielowski would work in the camp hygiene department from July 1943 to April 1945.

Compared to his conditions of confinement, Ciepielowski found himself in relative luxury. Prisoners in the hygiene unit had individual beds with clean linens, and were given additional rations of sugar, fat, and bread. They also ate the meat from the rabbits used in the laboratory. Rabbits were used in the production of vaccine because the other methods were deemed less acceptable; one involved growing the vaccine in typhus-infected lice, which the SS did not wish to introduce into the camp, and another involved culturing the vaccine in chicken eggs, and chicken and eggs were both likely to be stolen for food. Officially, two varieties of vaccine were produced in the camp - one meant for SS combat units, and another, of dubious quality, for the camp's inmates. Ciepielowski and his colleagues subverted this by producing a completely ineffective vaccine (made of water with small amounts of blood and formalin) to send to the front, while producing a high-quality, effective vaccine for other prisoners. This was accomplished largely through the intervention of the biologist and physician Ludwik Fleck, who had been sent to Buchenwald from Auschwitz; Fleck almost immediately recognized the flaws in the prisoners' methods, but was convinced to assist them in secretly creating a real, potent vaccine, while manufacturing the fake vaccine for the SS.

On one occasion, a Romanian researcher, suspicious after being unable to replicate the vaccine by the method utilized in the camp, submitted a paper demonstrating that the method was fraudulent. The paper made its way to Ding-Schuler, and put Ciepielowski and the other prison-researchers at risk of their lives. Ciepielowski successfully convinced Ding-Schuler that the Romanian doctor had erred, and authored a paper to that effect, to be published under Ding-Schuler's own name. It would be one of a half-dozen papers Ciepielowski wrote (with fellow inmate Eugen Kogon as his medical clerk) to be published under the name of the SS officer. Ciepielowski and the other researchers regarded Ding-Schuler (who had received his degree through party loyalty, rather than scholarship) to be a fool, easily manipulated due to his lack of medical knowledge.

== Post-war life ==
Ciepielowski spent the final days before the liberation of Buchenwald in hiding, with the Gestapo hunting the camp for him. He was liberated by American soldiers, and spent the next several years working as a medical inspector for the Red Cross, as well as the International Tracing Service of the Allied High Commission for Germany in the Exhumation and Identification Department. His activities were mentioned on multiple occasions in the Nuremberg Trials, particularly in the testimony of Eugen Kogon at the Doctors' trial. In one irony, the defendants in the Doctors' trial were immunized against typhus by their American captors, only to later learn that the vaccine they received was the fake one produced at Buchenwald (a fact unknown to the Americans at the time).

After his release from Buchenwald, Ciepielowski (along with fellow prisoner-doctor Robert Waitz, who had been imprisoned at Auschwitz and Buchenwald) wrote an article ("Le typhus experimental au camp de Buchenwald") on the typhus experiments in Buchenwald that was published in May 1946. He was later approached by representatives of a large pharmaceutical firm who were stymied by their inability to produce a viable typhus vaccine using the fraudulent methods published under Ding-Schuler's name.

Ciepielowski married a fellow Polish survivor in West Germany, and in 1951 they immigrated to the United States. He worked at the Roosevelt Hospital in New York, where he eventually rose to the post of deputy director. He died in 1973 and was buried in Metuchen, New Jersey.
