= Brzezówka, Kolbuszowa County =

Brzezówka
- Village
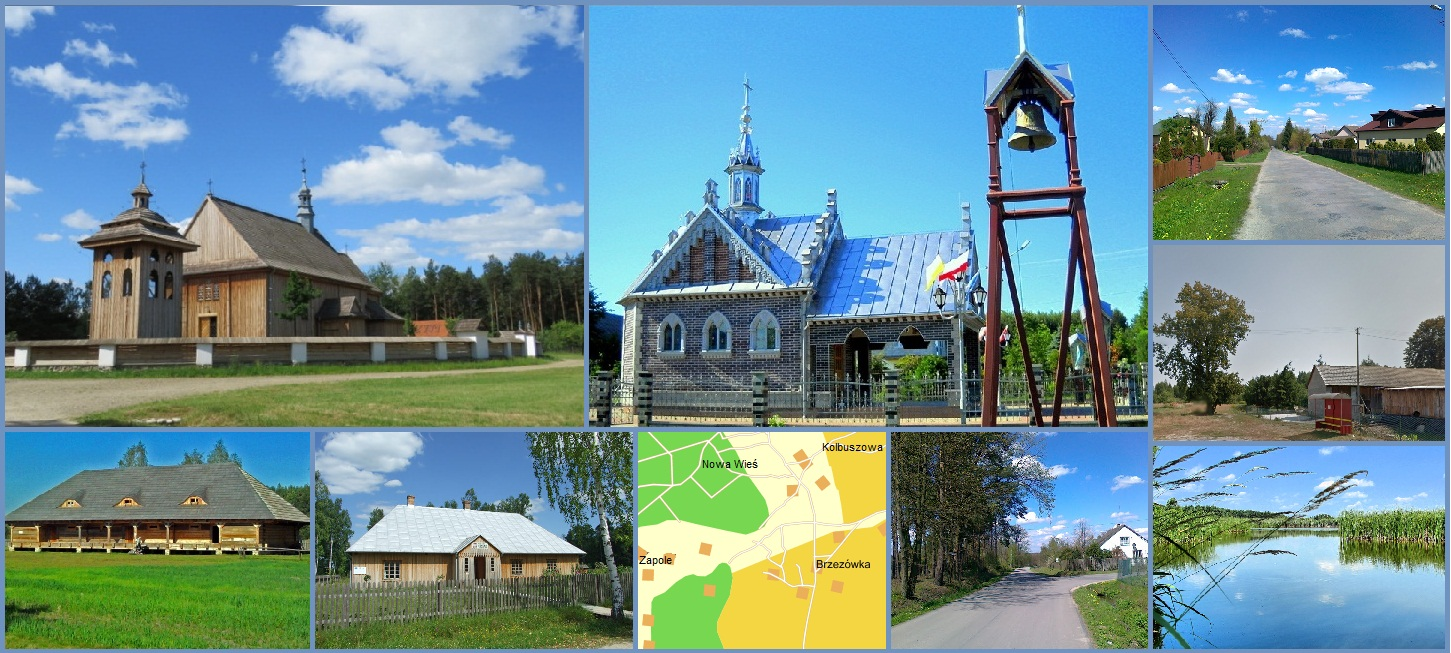

- Location within Poland
- Coordinates: 50°13′03″N 21°44′26″E
- Country: Poland
- Voivodeship: Subcarpathian
- County: Kolbuszowa
- Gmina: Kolbuszowa
- Population: 371

Brzezówka [bʐɛˈzufka] is a village and locality situated in the administrative district of Gmina Kolbuszowa, within Kolbuszowa County, Subcarpathian Voivodeship, in southeastern Poland. It lies approximately 2 kilometres (1 mile) south of Kolbuszowa and 28 kilometres (17 miles) northwest of the regional capital, Rzeszów.

In the past, Brzezówka was an independent locality, and it is now part of the Kolbuszowa municipality. Its official names are Brzezówka and Brzezówka-Domatków, and its SIMC code is 0652174.
