= Cmolas =

- Village
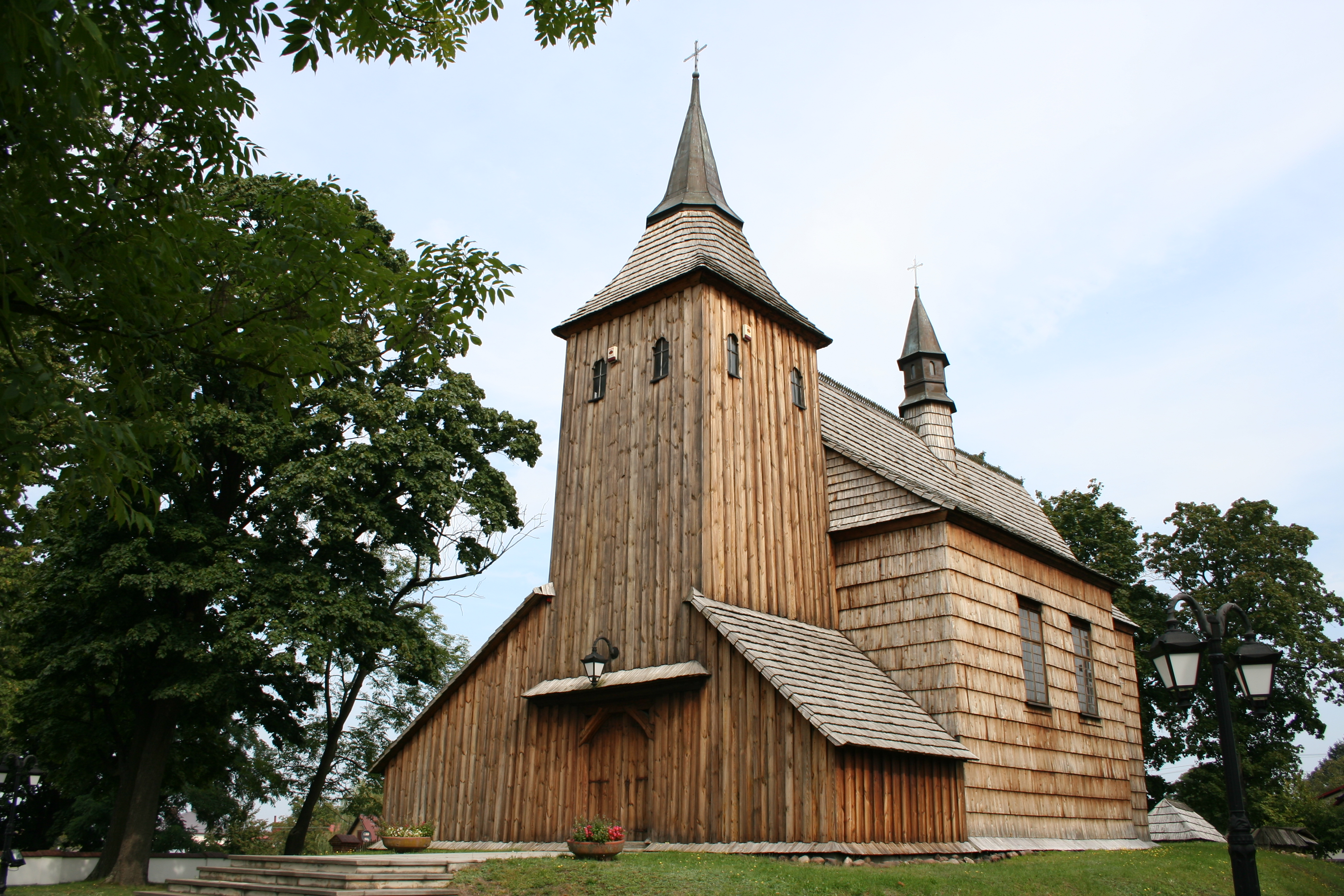
- Historic wooden church of the Transfiguration in Cmolas

- Location within Poland
- Coordinates: 50°18′N 21°45′E
- Country: Poland
- Voivodeship: Subcarpathian
- County: Kolbuszowa
- Gmina: Cmolas

Population
  - Total: 3,000
- Time zone: UTC+1 (CET)
  - Summer (DST): UTC+2 (CEST)
- Vehicle registration: RKL

Cmolas [ˈt͡smɔlas] is a village in Kolbuszowa County, Subcarpathian Voivodeship, in south-eastern Poland. It is the seat of the gmina (administrative district) called Gmina Cmolas.

Four Polish citizens were murdered by Nazi Germany in the village during World War II.
