= Raniżów =

- Village
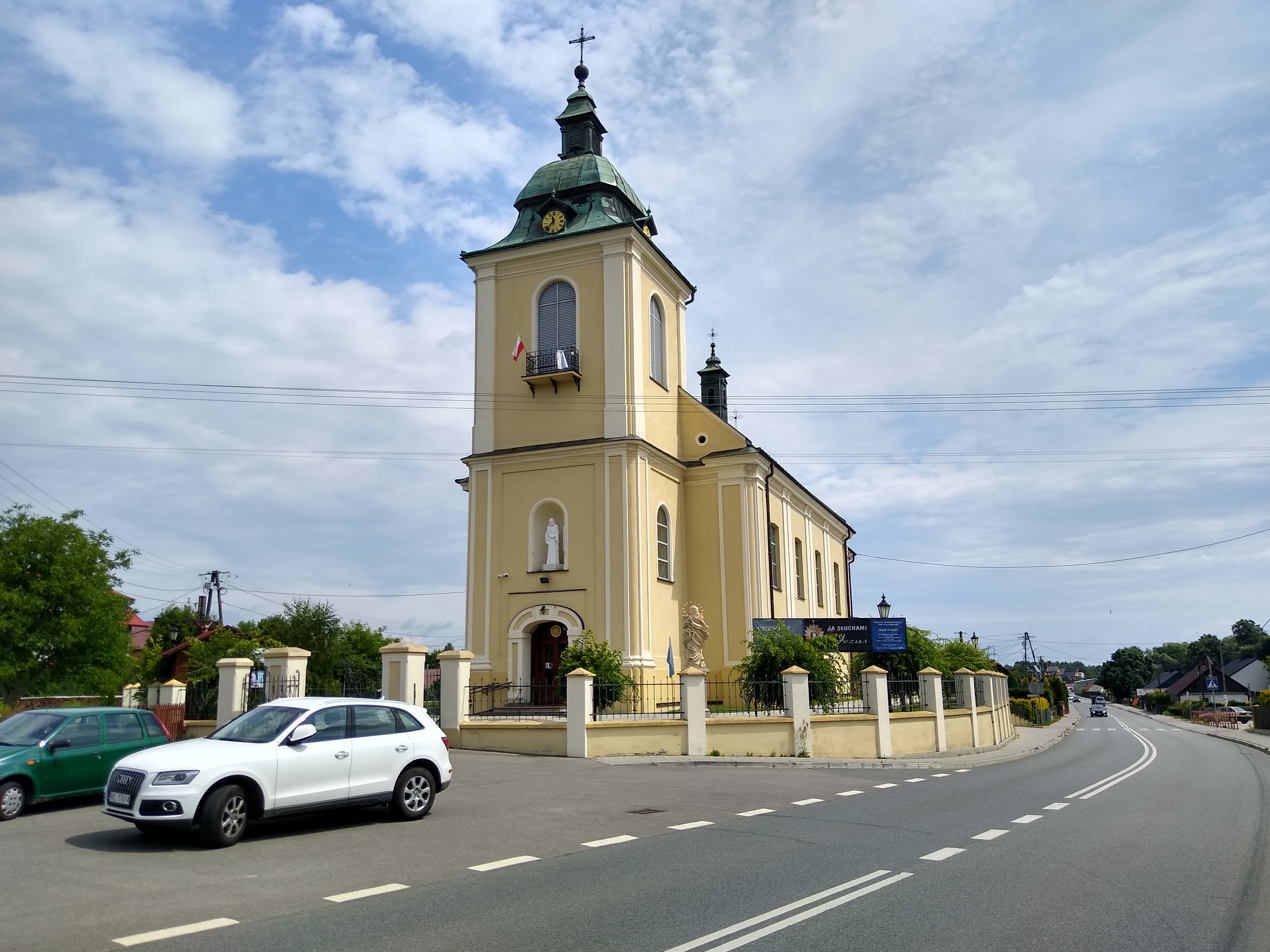
- Church of the Assumption

- Location within Poland
- Coordinates: 50°16′N 21°59′E
- Country: Poland
- Voivodeship: Subcarpathian
- County: Kolbuszowa
- Gmina: Raniżów
- Population: 2,200
- Website: http://www.ranizow.pl

Raniżów [raˈniʐuf] is a village in Kolbuszowa County, Subcarpathian Voivodeship, in south-eastern Poland. It is the seat of the gmina (administrative district) called Gmina Raniżów.
