= Kolbuszowa County =

Kolbuszowa County Powiat kolbuszowski
- County
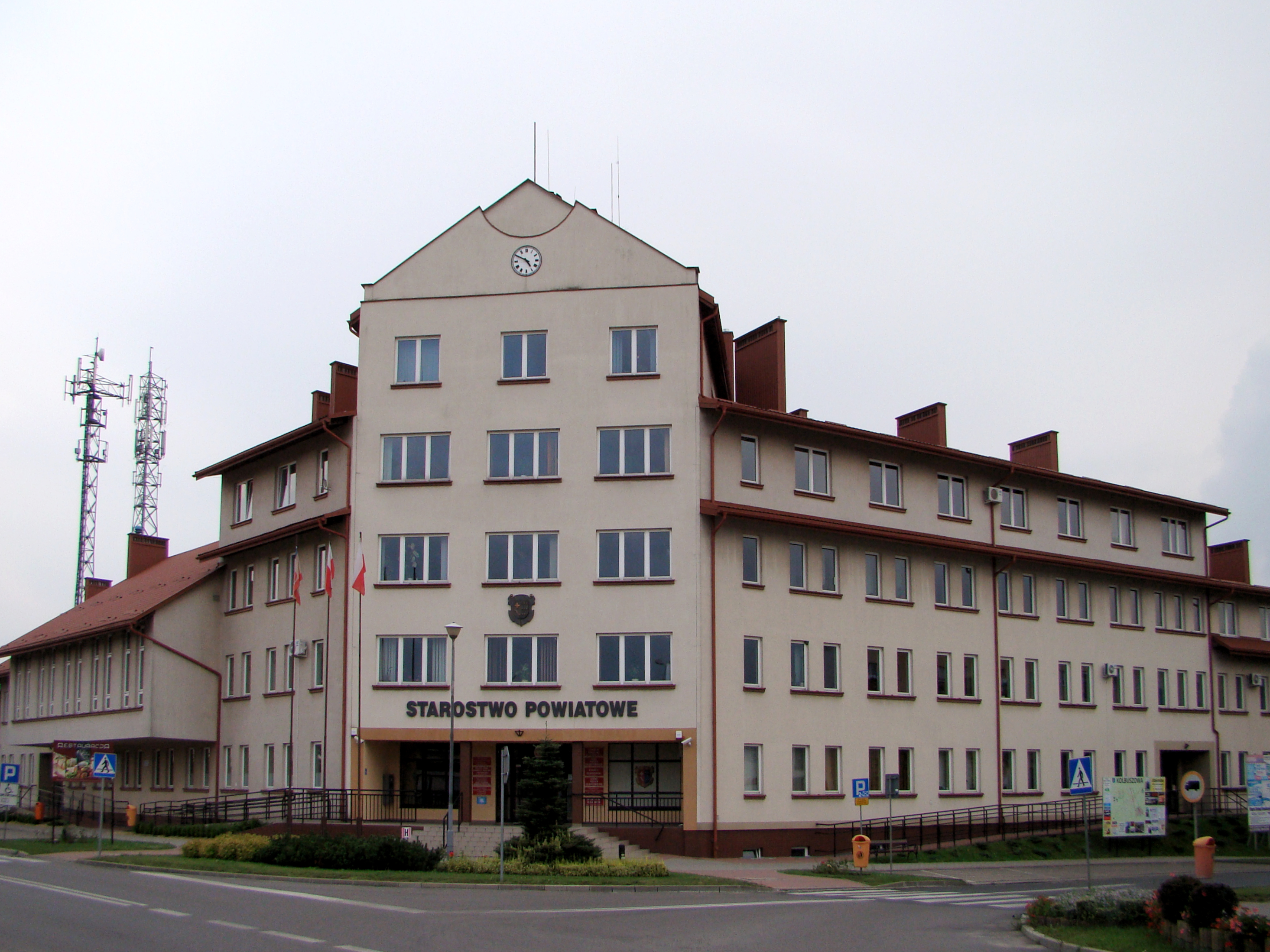
- Kolbuszowa County Governor's Office

- Flag Coat of arms

- Location within the voivodeship
- Coordinates (Kolbuszowa): 50°15′N 21°46′E
- Country: Poland
- Voivodeship: Subcarpathian
- Seat: Kolbuszowa
- Gminas: Total 6: Gmina Cmolas; Gmina Dzikowiec; Gmina Kolbuszowa; Gmina Majdan Królewski; Gmina Niwiska; Gmina Raniżów

Area
  - Total: 773.93 km^{2} (298.82 sq mi)

Population (2019)
  - Total: 62,389
  - Density: 80.613/km^{2} (208.79/sq mi)
  - Urban: 9,075
  - Rural: 53,314
- Car plates: RKL
- Website: www.powiat.kolbuszowski.pl

Kolbuszowa County (Polish: powiat kolbuszowski) is a unit of territorial administration and local government (powiat) in Subcarpathian Voivodeship, south-eastern Poland. It came into being on January 1, 1999, as a result of the Polish local government reforms passed in 1998. Its administrative seat and only town is Kolbuszowa, which lies 30 kilometres (19 mi) north-west of the regional capital Rzeszów.

The county covers an area of 773.93 square kilometres (298.8 sq mi). As of 2019 its total population is 62,389, out of which the population of Kolbuszowa is 9,075 and the rural population is 53,314.

== Neighbouring counties ==
Kolbuszowa County is bordered by Tarnobrzeg County and Stalowa Wola County to the north, Nisko County to the north-east, Rzeszów County to the south-east, Ropczyce-Sędziszów County to the south, and Mielec County to the west.

== Administrative divisions ==
The county is subdivided into six gminas (one urban-rural and five rural). These are listed in the following table, in descending order of population.

Gmina	Type	Area (km^{2})	Population (2019)	Seat
Gmina Kolbuszowa	urban-rural	170.8	24,795	Kolbuszowa
Gmina Majdan Królewski	rural	155.3	9,865	Majdan Królewski
Gmina Cmolas	rural	136.3	8,124	Cmolas
Gmina Raniżów	rural	96.7	7,047	Raniżów
Gmina Dzikowiec	rural	122.0	6,490	Dzikowiec
Gmina Niwiska	rural	93.0	6,068	Niwiska
