= Borsod-Abaúj-Zemplén County 6th constituency =

Hungarian national legislative constituency

Borsod-Abaúj-Zemplén County 6th constituency (Tiszaújváros)
- Constituency for the National Assembly
- Location of Borsod-Abaúj-Zemplén county 06 within Borsod-Abaúj-Zemplén county

- Location of Borsod-Abaúj-Zemplén county within Hungary
- County: Borsod-Abaúj-Zemplén
- Electorate: 76,032 (2022)
- Major settlements: Tiszaújváros

Current constituency
- Created: 2011
- Party: Tisza Party
- Member: Zoltán Bihari
- Elected: 2026

The 6th constituency of Borsod-Abaúj-Zemplén County (Hungarian: Borsod-Abaúj-Zemplén megyei 06. számú országgyűlési egyéni választókerület) is one of the single member constituencies of the National Assembly, the national legislature of Hungary. The constituency standard abbreviation: Borsod-Abaúj-Zemplén 06. OEVK.

Since 2026, it has been represented by Zoltán Bihari of the Tisza Party.

== Geography ==
The 6th constituency is located in eastern part of Borsod-Abaúj-Zemplén County.

=== List of municipalities ===
The constituency includes the following municipalities:

1. Alsódobsza
2. Aszaló
3. Bekecs
4. Bodrogkeresztúr
5. Bodrogkisfalud
6. Bőcs
7. Csobaj
8. Gesztely
9. Girincs
10. Halmaj
11. Hernádkak
12. Hernádkércs
13. Hernádnémeti
14. Kesznyéten
15. Kiscsécs
16. Legyesbénye
17. Mád
18. Megyaszó
19. Mezőzombor
20. Monok
21. Nagykinizs
22. Onga
23. Oszlár
24. Prügy
25. Sajóörös
26. Sajószöged
27. Sóstófalva
28. Szentistvánbaksa
29. Szerencs
30. Szikszó
31. Taktabáj
32. Taktaharkány
33. Taktakenéz
34. Taktaszada
35. Tarcal
36. Tiszaladány
37. Tiszalúc
38. Tiszapalkonya
39. Tiszatardos
40. Tiszaújváros
41. Tokaj
42. Újcsanálos

== Members ==
The constituency was first represented by László Varga of the Fidesz from 2014 to 2018. In the 2018 election Ferenc Koncz of the Fidesz was elected representative until his death in 2020. In the by-election of 2020 Zsófia Koncz of the Fidesz was elected representative and she was re-elected in 2022. In the 2026 election, Zoltán Bihari of the Tisza Party was elected representative.

Election	Member	Party	%	Ref.
2014	Roland Mengyi	Fidesz	40.43	
2018	Ferenc Koncz	Fidesz	49.30	
2020 by-election	Zsófia Koncz	Fidesz	50.51	
2022	Zsófia Koncz	Fidesz	59.00	
2026	Zoltán Bihari	Tisza Party	51.20	
