= List of Hungarian by-elections =

By-elections in Hungary occur to fill vacant constituency seats in the National Assembly of Hungary. Vacant list seats are filled by the next member of the list of the respective MP. If there are no more members on the list, the seat is left vacant.

== By-elections ==
=== 2022–2026 Parliament ===
| Constituency | Date | Incumbent | Party | Winner | Party | Cause | Source |
|---|---|---|---|---|---|---|---|
| Budapest 11 | 2025-03-23 | László Varju | DK | László Varju | DK | Resignation (Note: László Varju resigned on 6 December 2024, because he was convicted of disorderly conduct.) | |
| Tolna 02 | 2025-01-12 | Árpád Potápi | Fidesz | Krisztina Csibi | Fidesz | Death (Note: Árpád Potápi died on 17 October 2024) | |

=== 2018–2022 Parliament ===
| Constituency | Date | Incumbent | Party | Winner | Party | Cause | Source |
|---|---|---|---|---|---|---|---|
| Borsod 06 | 2020-10-11 | Ferenc Koncz | Fidesz | Zsófia Koncz | Fidesz | Death (Note: Ferenc Koncz died on 10 July 2020) | |
| Fejér 04 | 2020-02-16 | Tamás Pintér | Jobbik | Gergely Kálló | Jobbik (Note: Also supported by DK, MSZP, Greens, Momentum and Párbeszéd.) | Resignation (Note: Pintér was elected Mayor of Dunaújváros, as a result he resigned on 28 October 2019.) | |

=== 2014–2018 Parliament ===
| Constituency | Date | Incumbent | Party | Winner | Party | Cause | Source |
|---|---|---|---|---|---|---|---|
| Veszprém 03 | 2015-04-12 | Jenő Lasztovicza | Fidesz | Lajos Rig | Jobbik | Death (Note: Jenő Lasztovicza died on 8 January 2015.) | |
| Veszprém 01 | 2015-02-22 | Tibor Navracsics | Fidesz | Zoltán Kész | Ind. (Note: Supported by MSZP and other left-wing opposition parties.) | Resignation (Note: Tibor Navracsics was appointed European Commissioner, as a result he resigned on 30 October 2014.) | |
| Budapest 11 | 2014-11-23 | Péter Kiss | MSZP | Imre Horváth | MSZP | Death (Note: Péter Kiss died on 29 July 2014.) | |

=== 2010–2014 Parliament ===
| Constituency | Date | Incumbent | Party | Winner | Party | Cause | Source |
|---|---|---|---|---|---|---|---|
| Békés 03 | 2010-09-19, 2010-10-03 | László Domokos | Fidesz | Béla Dankó | Fidesz | Resignation (Note: László Domokos was elected for chairman of State Audit Office) | |
| Hajdú-Bihar 06 | 2011-06-05, 2011-06-19, 2011-10-02, 2011-10-16 | Sándor Arnóth | Fidesz | Sándor Bodó | Fidesz | Death (Note: Sándor Arnóth died in 16 March 2011) | |
| Budapest 02 | 2011-11-13, 2011-11-27 | István Balsai | Fidesz | Zsolt Láng | Fidesz | Resignation (Note: István Balsai was elected for member of the Constitutional Court.) | |

=== 2006–2010 Parliament ===
| Constituency | Date | Incumbent | Party | Winner | Party | Cause | Source |
|---|---|---|---|---|---|---|---|
| Veszprém 06 | 2010-10-01 | Balázs Horváth | Fidesz | Zsolt Horváth | Fidesz | Death (Note: Balázs Horváth died in 2 July 2006) | |
| Budapest 15 | 2008-01-27, 2008-02-10 | András Deák | KDNP | Bence Rétvári | Fidesz | Death (Note: András Deák died in 20 October 2007) | |
| Budapest 12 | 2009-01-11, 2009-01-25 | Ferenc Gegesy | SZDSZ | János Bácskai | Fidesz | Resignation (Note: Ferenc Gegesy resigned.) | |
| Baranya 03 | 2009-06-07, 2009-06-21, 2009-10-04, 2009-10-18 | László Toller | MSZP | unfilled | unfilled | Incapacity (Note: László Toller lost his capacity due to his car accident. The elections were invalid due to low turnout.) | |
| Győr-Moson-Sopron 05 | 2009-11-08, 2009-11-22 | János Áder | Fidesz | Alpár Gyopáros | Fidesz | Resignation (Note: János Áder was elected to MEP.) | |

=== 2002–2006 Parliament ===
| Constituency | Date | Incumbent | Party | Winner | Party | Cause | Source |
|---|---|---|---|---|---|---|---|
| Győr-Moson-Sopron 07 | 2004-11-14, 2004-11-28, 2005-04-24, 2005-05-08 | József Szájer | Fidesz | Mátyás Firtl | Fidesz | Resignation (Note: József Szájer was elected to MEP.) | |
| Nógrád 03 | 2004-11-14, 2004-11-28 | László Surján | Fidesz | Andor Nagy | Fidesz | Resignation (Note: László Surján was elected to MEP.) | |

=== 1998–2002 Parliament ===
| Constituency | Date | Incumbent | Party | Winner | Party | Cause | Source |
|---|---|---|---|---|---|---|---|
| Fejér 02 | 1999-09-26, 1999-10-10, 2000-04-02, 2000-04-16 | Béla Gyuricza | Fidesz | Albert Molnár | MSZP | Death (Note: Béla Gyuricza died.) | |
| Somogy 03 | 1999-09-26, 1999-10-10 | Péter Kálmán Rajcsányi | Fidesz | József Házas | MSZP | Death (Note: Péter Kálmán Rajcsányi died.) | |
| Szabolcs-Szatmár-Bereg 10 | 2000-04-02, 2000-04-16 | József Zilahi | MDF | János Lengyel | FKgP | Death (Note: József Zilahi died.) | |
| Pest 14 | 2001-03-25, 2001-04-08 | Attila Buza | Fidesz | Lajos Szűcs | Fidesz | Death (Note: Attila Buza died.) | |

=== 1994–98 Parliament ===
No by-election was held during this Parliament.

=== 1990–94 Parliament ===
| Constituency | Date | Incumbent | Party | Winner | Party | Cause | Source |
|---|---|---|---|---|---|---|---|
| Komárom-Esztergom 03 | 1991-03-24, 1991-04-14, 1991-07-14, 1991-09-15, 1992-01-12, 1992-02-16, 1992-06-07, 1992-06-21 | Sándor Deák | SZDSZ | György Keleti | MSZP | Death (Note: Sándor Deák died.) | |
| Budapest 09 | 1991-03-27, 1991-04-14 | Gábor Demszky | SZDSZ | Pál Filó | MSZP | Resignation (Note: Gábor Demszky was elected for mayor of Budapest.) | |
| Borsod-Abaúj Zemplén 11 | 1991-08-11, 1991-09-15 | Miklós Németh | Ind. | Mihály Kupa | Ind. | Resignation (Note: Miklós Németh resigned.) | |
| Békés 01 | 1992-05-10, 1992-05-24 | Zoltán Szokolay | MDF | Éva Sarkadiné Lukovics | SZDSZ | Resignation (Note: Zoltán Szokolay resigned.) | |
| Bács-Kiskun 04 | | József Faddi | FKgP | Tamás Gábor Nagy | Agrarian Alliance | Death (Note: József Faddi died.) | |

== See also ==
Elections in Hungary
