= Battle of Kassa (1849) =

Coordinates: 48°39′51.7″N 21°15′25.1″E

- Part of the Hungarian Revolution of 1848
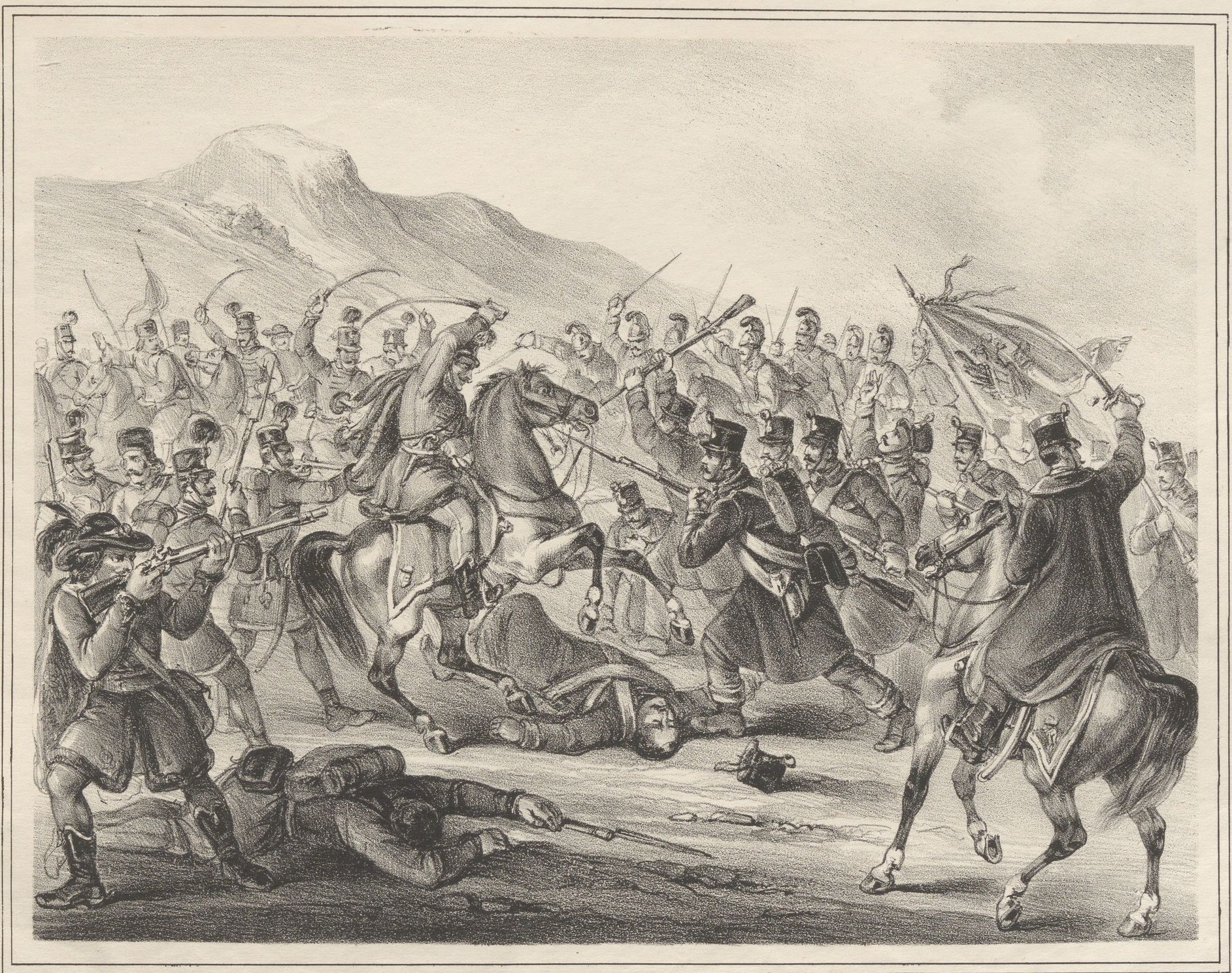
- Battle of Kassa 4 January 1849
| Date | 4 January 1849 |
| Location | Kassa, Abaúj-Torna County, Kingdom of Hungary |
| Result | Austrian victory |

Belligerents
| Hungarian Revolutionary Army; Polish Legion | Austrian Empire |

Commanders and leaders
| Lázár Mészáros; Arisztid Dessewffy | Franz Schlik |

Strength
| 8,400; 25 cannons | 6,000–7,000 men 22 cannons |

Casualties and losses
| Total: 3,393 (Note: The majority of these losses were soldiers who run away, as the result of the routing from the end of the battle, but the following days they returned to the army); 200 dead 502 captured 10 cannons | Total: 25–31; 3–5 dead, 13–15 wounded, 9–11 captured |

The Battle of Kassa was a battle in the Hungarian Revolution of 1848, fought on 4 January 1849 between Austria and Hungarian Revolutionary Army during the Winter Campaign of the Hungarian War of independence of 1848-1849. The Austrians were led by Lieutenant General Franz Schlik, while the Hungarians were led by General Lázár Mészáros. While the Austrian main army led by Field Marshal Alfred I, Prince of Windisch-Grätz was attacking Hungary from the West, Schlik's corps invaded Northern Hungary. The Hungarian Upper Tisza corps led by the Minister of War Lázár Mészáros tried to stop Schlik's corps, but he was defeated at Kassa. After this battle Colonel György Klapka, who will be more successful than Mészáros. On 9 January Kossuth appointed Colonel György Klapka to replace Mészáros.

== Background ==
At the beginning of December 1848, a K.u.K. army corps from the Habsburg province of Galicia invaded Northern Hungary. Its commander, Lieutenant General Count Franz Schlik, who was in his 60th year, was one of the most experienced and successful generals of the imperial army. One of his eyes was supposedly gouged out by a drunken Cossacks in the Napoleonic Wars, but contemporaries say he could see more with his remaining half-eye than many other generals could with two. In November 1848 he was entrusted with the organization of the invasion of northern Hungary. The unrest in Galicia made it impossible to mobilize all the Habsburg forces, so Schlik crossed the Dukla Pass on 6 December 1848 with a little less than 8,000 men and 27 guns.

The task of the corps was to capture Kassa, after which it had to advance either through Miskolc or Rozsnyó towards Pest, in accordance with the war plan of the main Imperial Army led by Field Marshal Alfred I, Prince of Windisch-Grätz, which expected the decisive confrontation with the Hungarian army in the vicinity of Buda or Pest. Later, Windisch-Grätz, having been informed of the capture of Bártfa, modified this so that Schlik would march towards Vác via the Eger road or via Rozsnyó and Losonc. The prince recommended the latter, saying that the road to Eger was better, but it led through the countryside inhabited mostly by Hungarians (which for an Austrian army would be dangerous), while the route through Rozsnyó–Losonc–Vác would take him through Slovak-inhabited countryside; moreover, this route would allow him to easily come into contact with the columns of the K.u.K. Army advancing towards Nyitra and the mining towns.

Schlik captured Eperjes on 9 December, and on 11 December he clashed with the Hungarian corps assembled in haste under the command of Colonel Sándor Pulszky between Budamér and Kassa. Pulszky had a total of three newly formed Honvéd battalions, thousands of mobilised National Guards and 15 cannons. The first shots of the Hungarian artillery hit in the immediate vicinity of Schlik. The Imperial Artillery returned fire, which made the untrained National Guardsmen flee. The 19th Honvéd Battalion, taking up position on the right bank of the Hernád river, fired with 3 cannons at the Imperial troops, covering the retreat of the rest of the troops which evacuated Kassa and retreated towards Miskolc.

Schlik sent his light cavalry after them, led by Major Concorreggio and Captain Scudier, his chief of staff. The pursuit was initially successful, and the Imperial troops almost caught up with the Hungarian artillery.

But then a handful of the infantry uhlans of the Polish Legion and the 20th Honvéd Battalion took a stance in their way at the tavern from Bárca. Major Wladyslaw Tchorznicki, the leader of the group, was a true veteran, having fought in the Polish uprising of 1830-31. He took up a position behind the stone wall of the tavern with his soldiers, let the Imperial Cavalry close in, and then poured such a volley of fire on them that Major Concorreggio and several of the officers were killed, Scudier was wounded and taken prisoner, and the others fled struck by panic. Thanks to them the rest of the Hungarian army could retreat to Miskolc unharmed.

== Prelude ==
The defeat in Budamér had caused serious concern in the National Defence Commission (the de facto governing body of Hungary during the war with Austria), and all reinforcements were directed towards there. These were also mostly newly formed, untrained honvéd battalions and cavalry units. The command of the corps was taken over by the Minister of War himself, General Lázár Mészáros, while Bertalan Szemere, a prominent member of the National Defence Commission, was appointed as the plenipotentiary national commissioner of the area. By the end of December the corps had reached 10,000 men and 25 guns.

Mészáros planned a combined attack to retake Kassa. A total of 1,400 troops of the Hungarian Army and National Guards in the counties of Szepes, Ung, and Bereg were to attack Eperjes from two directions on 1 January, and after its capture, to attack Kassa from the north. In the meantime, Mészáros would have pushed towards the city from the south.

Meanwhile, Schlik received orders from Windisch-Grätz to set off for Pest. But Schlik decided to reconnoiter the Miskolc area before carrying out the order, to avoid being flanked by the Hungarians. He departed on 26 December, by which time Mészáros had deployed his corps at Szikszó.

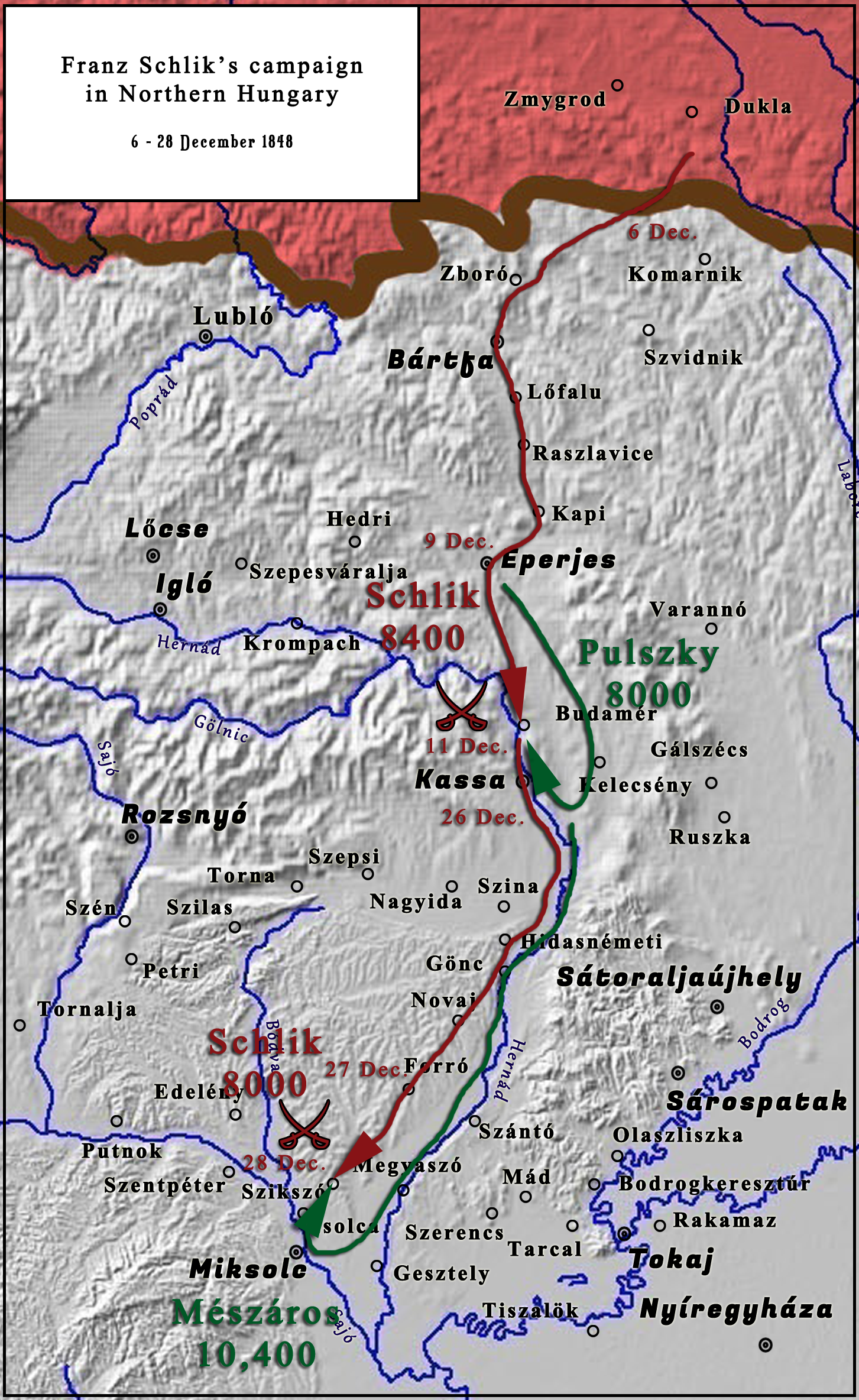
The military events until the battle of Bassa from 4 January 1849

The outposts of both corps met on 27 December, and on 28 December the main forces of Mészáros and Schlik faced each other in the Battle of Szikszó. Schlik advanced and Mészáros, fearing an outflanking, retreated towards Miskolc. Schlik, however, did not follow him but during the evening retreated towards Kassa. Schlik feared that his troops would be attacked by the fanaticized Hungarian population if he continued to advance. He also received news of an imminent Hungarian attack on Eperjes, and decided to concentrate his troops in Kassa.

On 30 December, Mészáros informed of Schlik's withdrawal, set off for Kassa. Mészáros then sent his detachments forward, as it follows: Lieutenant Colonel Arisztid Dessewffy was pushed forward to Szikszó, Major Miklós Perczel to Edelény, and Major Henryk Rembowsky to Felsőzsolca; Colonel Sándor Pulszky's brigade remained for the time being at Miskolc. On 31 December, Dessewffy's troops spent the night at Forró, Pulszky's at Szikszó, Rembowszky's at Nagykinizs, Perczel's at Perkupa; the latter kept the connection with Dessewffy's troops by the 17th Honvéd battalion of Captain Schulz Bódog sent to Késmárk, and reinforced by a platoon of mounted national guards from Heves county. On 1 January 1849, Dessewffy reached Garadna, Pulszky Forró, Rembowszky Vizsoly, and Perczel Torna; Schulz's detachment pushed forward to Gagy. On 2 January, Dessewffy marched to Hidasnémeti, Pulszky to Szurdok, Rembowszky to Gönc, Perczel to Nagyida and Schulz to Perény. Meanwhile, the Zemplén detachment under Lieutenant Colonel Thworzniczky, having reached Gálszécs on 1 January, set out the next day to occupy the Dargó Pass, which was held by Austrian Captain Matischek with 1 squadron (2 companies) of the Parma-landwehr battalion and 1 cavalry platoon. Lieutenant Colonel Thworzniczky's raiding party consisted of 1 company of Polish legionnaires (80 men), 1 company of Abaúj volunteers (60 men), 3 companies of Zemplén volunteers (300 men), 1/2 company of Ferdinand hussars (40 horsemen) and 2 guns; in all 440 infantry, 40 hussars and 2 guns. On 2 January, Thworzniczky attacked Matischek and pushed him back through Petőszinye. On 3 January, Mészáros's brigade reached Enyicke, Pulszky's brigade, which was joined by Schulz's detachment, Szakály, Rembowszky's brigade reached Zsadány and Perczel's brigade reached Buzinka. So the troops launched by Mészáros at the beginning were making promising progress to catch Schlik's troops between two fires. However, by 3 January, when he reached Kassa, he was informed that the planned combined attack failed. On 1 January, Hungarian detachments from Bereg and Szepes attacked Eperes, with its small garrison, but failed. Also contributed to the failure that, contrary to the plan, the attacks were carried out separately rather than simultaneously. At the appointed time, only the Szepes detachment arrived at Eperjes, only to be met by the imperials, who had been informed of the action and struck them with a surprise attack. Their failure was compounded by the fact that the artillerymen did not intervene due to lack of cavalry cover. The Bereg detachment arrived 3–4 hours late and was also forced to retreat. The Imperial troops not only repulsed the attacks, but a small detachment broke into Spiš, towards Béla. But also, the fate of the Hungarian detachment occupying the Dargo Pass ended with disaster. Schlik, having received news of the occupation of the pass and fearing an attack from several directions, sent troops (4 squadrons of infantry, 2 platoons of cavalry, 2 cannons) to recapture it, which found the detachment already in the night from 2 to 3 January in Petőszinye. After the Zemplén Volunteer National Guards failed to perform their security duties properly, they were caught by surprise and abandoned Szinye and the Dargó Pass, and fled through Gálszécs to Terebes, leaving behind a considerable amount of equipment, weapons, and 20 prisoners.

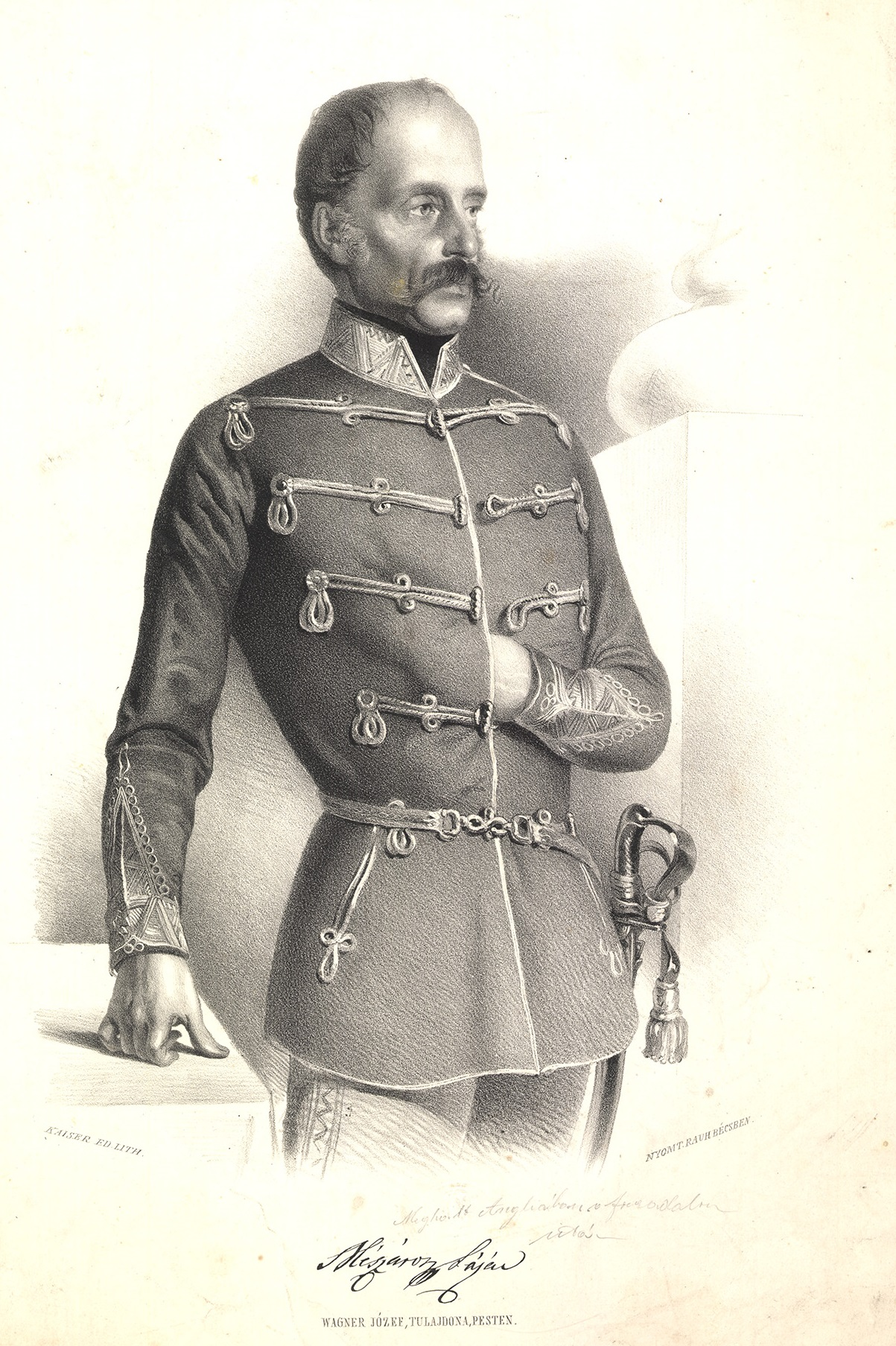
Mészáros Lázár

Having defeated the encircling troops, Schlik was thus able to turn almost all his strength against the Hungarian corps. On 4 January, Mészáros could only rely on the main forces advancing from Miskolc (about 8,400 men, 25 guns), but he still outnumbered Schlik's forces concentrated at Kassa (about 6,000–7,000 men, 22 guns).

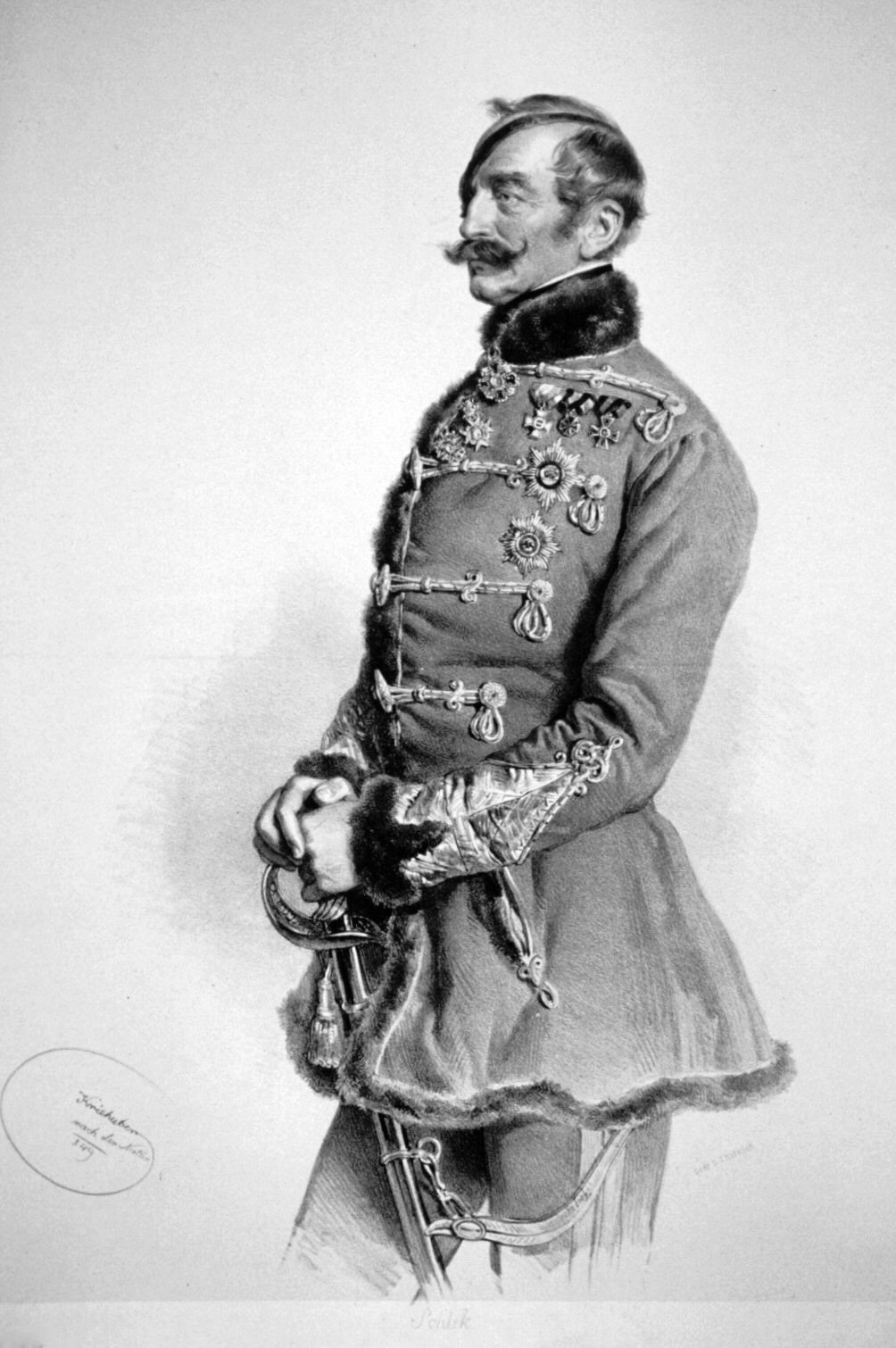
Franz von Schlik

Schlik deployed his troops on both sides of the main road, the key to his position being the hill west of the main road called Akasztófahegy (Gallow mountain). Its approach was made more difficult by the steep-banked Miszlóka stream flowing in front of it. Schlik, having been informed of Mészáros' approach only late, at noon on 4 January, positioned his corps south of Kassa as follows: on the left flank, under Major General Deym, between the road to Pest and the Hernád, the two companies of the Archduke Wilhelm Regiment's the 3rd battalion in the front line, 4 companies of the same infantry regiment's 1st battalion, with 2 companies of the Sunstenau Cuirassiers in reserve behind the first line; 2 guns of the 11th twelve-pounder battery on the road, while the other 4 cannons of the battery were deployed on the right side of the road. On the Akasztófahegy hill 2 Company of Archduke Wilhelm's Regiment was deployed with a Congreve rocket battery, and to the right of it, as far as the road to Szepes, 2 companies of the 2nd Hartmann Battalion, 3 platoons of chevau-légers and 4 guns were in position. The task of the other four companies of the 2nd Hartmann Battalion with two guns, under the command of the Chief of Staff of the Corps, Major Baron Gablenz, was to advance towards Miszlóka, to attack the left flank and rear of the enemy advancing on the Szepes road, and to capture the bridge of the Miszlóka stream. General Pergen, with 1 battalion of the Koudelka Infantry Regiment and 1 company of the Imperial Chevau-légers, was deployed on the Kálváriahegy (Calvary Hill) to support, if necessary, Major Gablenz, and possibly to attack the enemy from the flank in case of a successful Hungarian advance on the road to Pest. As a general reserve, General Fiedler took position along the main road to Pest at the southern exit of the city with the 3rd Mazzuchelli Battalion and the outposts which retreated there at the start of the battle.

At first, Mészáros was under the impression that Schlik had advanced to confront him up to Enyicke, so therefore the War Minister performed his advance slowly and with great caution. When he found out that his information was incorrect and the Austrians remained at Kassa, Mészáros ordered a further advance at 8 o'clock in the morning of 4 January. Dessewffy's brigade, together with Rembowszky's half brigade, had to Demonstration (military)demonstrate along the Pest main road, Pulszky's brigade was to cross the Miszlóka stream between Bárca and the road to Buzinka and, together with Perczel's half brigade advancing along the same road, was to lead the decisive attack, outflanking at the same time the enemy's right wing, with the aim of pushing the Austrians into the Hernád. As mentioned above, the strengths of the demonstration force and the units which had to perform the decisive attack were almost equal.

Information was also obtained about Schlik's army, which restored the earlier optimism. Such news was that 6/8 of the imperial soldiers were recruits. This was true for several units. However, the Hungarian troops were also made up of new recruits, so they could only rely on diversionary actions and larger numbers. In addition, the corps was constantly experiencing ammunition supply problems, of which Schlik had plenty.

=== Opposing forces ===
Hungarian army:

| Army section | Unit | Men | Horses | Cannons |
|---|---|---|---|---|
| Avantgarde brigade Commander: Lieutenant Colonel Arisztid Dessewffy | 17. Honvéd battalion | 1,200 | - | - |
| Avantgarde brigade Commander: Lieutenant Colonel Arisztid Dessewffy | 42. Honvéd battalion | 1,100 | - | - |
| Avantgarde brigade Commander: Lieutenant Colonel Arisztid Dessewffy | 4 companies of the 26. Honvéd battalion | 760 | - | - |
| Avantgarde brigade Commander: Lieutenant Colonel Arisztid Dessewffy | 1 company of the Eger Guards | 120 | - | - |
| Avantgarde brigade Commander: Lieutenant Colonel Arisztid Dessewffy | 1 squadron of the Koburg Hussars | 160 | 160 | - |
| Avantgarde brigade Commander: Lieutenant Colonel Arisztid Dessewffy | Mounted National Guards from Heves | 200 | 200 | - |
| Avantgarde brigade Commander: Lieutenant Colonel Arisztid Dessewffy | 1/2 six-pounder Infantry Battery | 50 | 40 | ? |
| Avantgarde brigade Commander: Lieutenant Colonel Arisztid Dessewffy | 1/2 six-pounder Cavalry Battery | 50 | 40 | ? |
| Avantgarde brigade Commander: Lieutenant Colonel Arisztid Dessewffy | Total | 3,640 | 440 | ? |
| Left wing brigade Commander: Major Miklós Perczel | 52. Honvéd battalion | 900 | - | - |
| Left wing brigade Commander: Major Miklós Perczel | 1 company of the Duke of Prussia Infantry Regiment | 100 | - | - |
| Left wing brigade Commander: Major Miklós Perczel | Mezőtúr and Nagykunság national guards | 320 | - | - |
| Left wing brigade Commander: Major Miklós Perczel | 1 squadron of the Hunyadi Hussars | 170 | 170 | - |
| Left wing brigade Commander: Major Miklós Perczel | Mounted National Guards from Heves | 300 | 300 | - |
| Left wing brigade Commander: Major Miklós Perczel | 1/2 three-pounder Infantry Battery | 50 | 50 | 4 |
| Left wing brigade Commander: Major Miklós Perczel | Total | 1,840 | 520 | 4 |
| Center brigade Commander: Colonel Sándor Pulszky | 20. Honvéd battalion | 1,000 | - | - |
| Center brigade Commander: Colonel Sándor Pulszky | 43. Honvéd battalion | 1,100 | - | - |
| Center brigade Commander: Colonel Sándor Pulszky | 4 companies of the 26. Honvéd battalion | 760 | - | - |
| Center brigade Commander: Colonel Sándor Pulszky | Miskolc and Borsod Volunteers | 600 | - | - |
| Center brigade Commander: Colonel Sándor Pulszky | 1 company of the Heves jägers | 100 | - | - |
| Center brigade Commander: Colonel Sándor Pulszky | 1 squadron of the Lehel Hussars | 305 | 305 | - |
| Center brigade Commander: Colonel Sándor Pulszky | 1 squadron of the Württenberg Hussars | 70 | 70 | - |
| Center brigade Commander: Colonel Sándor Pulszky | Mounted National Guards from Heves | 760 | 760 | - |
| Center brigade Commander: Colonel Sándor Pulszky | 1 three-pounder Infantry Battery | 100 | 100 | 7 |
| Center brigade Commander: Colonel Sándor Pulszky | 1/2 six-pounder Infantry Battery | 50 | 50 | 4 |
| Center brigade Commander: Colonel Sándor Pulszky | 1/2 three-pounder Infantry Battery | 50 | 50 | 4 |
| Center brigade Commander: Colonel Sándor Pulszky | Total | 4,135 | 1,335 | 11 |
| Right wing 1/2 brigade Commander: Major Henryk Rembowski | 2 companies of the 20. Honvéd battalion | 360 | - | - |
| Right wing 1/2 brigade Commander: Major Henryk Rembowski | 3 companies of the Polish Legion | ? | - | - |
| Right wing 1/2 brigade Commander: Major Henryk Rembowski | Total | 360 + ? | - | - |
| Grand total | | 10,000 + ? | 2,295 | 15 + ? |

This table shows the initial numbers of the Hungarian corps recorded on 31 December 1848. In the battle of Kassa not all of these participated, but 8,400 soldiers and 25 cannons.

Austrian army:

| Army section | Unit | Infantry company | Cavalry squadrons | Cannons |
|---|---|---|---|---|
| Fiedler brigade | 2. Battalion of the Hartmann Infantry Regiment | 6 | - | - |
| Fiedler brigade | 3. Battalion of the Wilhelm Infantry Regiment | 6 | - | - |
| Fiedler brigade | 3. Battalion of the Stefan Infantry Regiment | 6 | - | - |
| Fiedler brigade | 1. Major's squadron of the Imperial Chevau-Légers (Note: One of their wings was in Eperjes.) | - | 2 | - |
| Fiedler brigade | 36. six-pounder Infantry Battery | - | - | 6 |
| Fiedler brigade | Total | 18 | 2 | 6 |
| Pergen brigade | 3. Battalion of the Mazzuchelli Infantry Regiment | 6 | - | - |
| Pergen brigade | 3. Battalion of the Koudelka Infantry Regiment (Note: 2 companies were in Eperjes.) | 6 | - | - |
| Pergen brigade | 1. Landwehr Battalion of the Parma Infantry Regiment | 6 | - | - |
| Pergen brigade | Oberstleutnant's squadron of the Imperial Chevau-Léger Regiment | - | 2 | - |
| Pergen brigade | 34. six-pounder Infantry Battery (Note: 2 coannons were in Eperjes.) | - | - | 6 |
| Pergen brigade | Total | 18 | 2 | 6 |
| Deym brigade | 1. Battalion of the Wilhelm Infantry Regiment | 6 | - | - |
| Deym brigade | Sapper unit | 1 | - | - |
| Deym brigade | 3. Battalion of the Nugent Infantry Regiment (Note: Was in Eperjes.) | 6 | - | - |
| Deym brigade | Oberstleutnant's squadron of the Sunstenau Cuirassier Regiment | - | 2 | - |
| Deym brigade | 11. twelve-pounder Infantry Battery | - | - | 6 |
| Deym brigade | 11. Congreve rocket Battery | - | - | 6 |
| Deym brigade | 12. 1/2 Congreve rocket Battery (Note: Was in Eperjes.) | - | - | 3 |
| Deym brigade | Total | 13 | - | 15 |
| Grand total | | 49 | 6 | 27 |

The total number of the Austrian forces under Schlik which fought in the Battle of Kassa was around 6000-7000 soldiers and 22 cannons.

== Battle ==
In the early morning of 4 January, the Dessewffy Brigade approached Kassa from the southwest, reaching the area of Enyicke. The Austrian troops had not fully occupied their designated positions when, at 2.30 p.m., the first to appear on the height the brickmaking manufactures were placed was Sándor Perczel's troops. Soon afterward, the brigade of Dessewffy, with the 26th Honvéd battalion, began to advance from Bárca, the two cavalry companies of the brigade and the six-pounder battery moved on the right side of the road, while the volunteers from Eger, on their left flank with the 42nd Honvéd battalion marched on the left side of the road. Between the Dessewffy Brigade and the Hernád, the Rembowszky Brigade entered the line of battle as the most further right unit. According to the issued instructions, the Pulszky Brigade, which had left the road to the west, reached the Miszlóka stream shortly after the Dessewffy Brigade, and crossing it, took up a combat formation divided into two lines; in the middle of the first line was a six-pounder battery, and to the right of it the 20th and 43rd, and on the left the 17th Honvéd battalion; in the center of the second line of battle was a six-pounder battery, with the Borsod Volunteers on the right and the cavalry of the brigade under Major Bobory on the left. On the Hungarian side, there was already some confusion at the deployment, as several units, such as the 17th Honvéd Battalion, did not take up positions at the place specified in the battle plan.

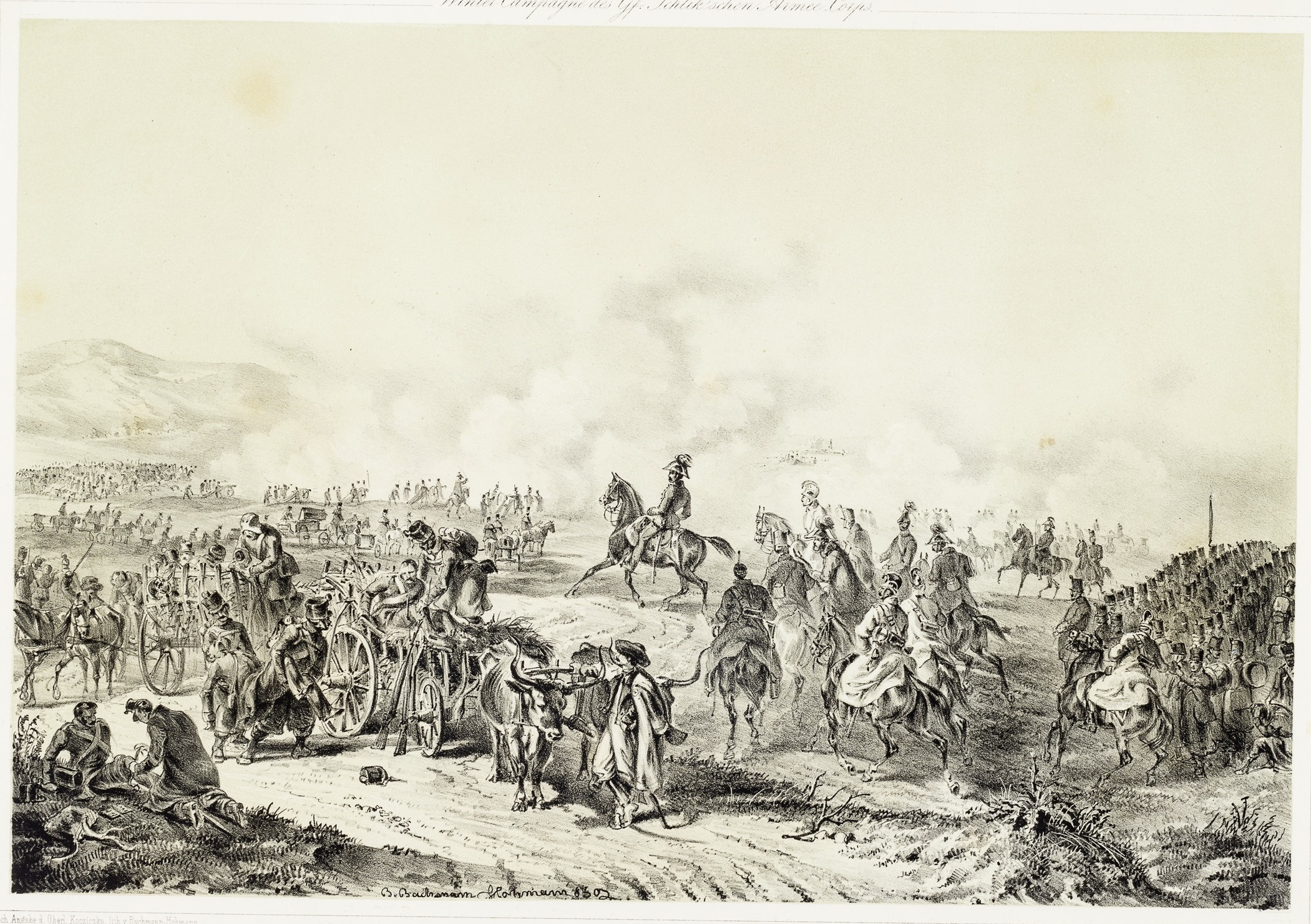
Battle of Kassa - Bachmann Hohmann

According to Mészáros's plans, the Pulszky brigade in the center was to attack the key point of the enemy's battle line, the imperial positions on the Akasztófa hill in front of it. Around half past two in the afternoon, the brigade, with difficulty crossing the Miszlóka stream, began its advance towards the hill. To the west of it, the left flank was represented by Major Sándor Perczel's half brigade, while on the right flank the Dessewffy brigade attacked, reinforced by Major Rembowski's half brigade. As the center crossed the Miszlóka stream and developed into a battle formation, the 34th (Prince of Prussia) Infantry Company of the Perczel Brigade managed to capture the brickyard, and from there the Imperials were driven back to Kassa. Perczel's troops reached the outskirts of the town, but the attack was blocked by the artillery of the K.u.K. artillery. Dessewffy, seeing the left wing's stalling, immediately began to fire at the enemy troops along the highway near the cemetery, but his attack was made impossible by the fire of the twelve-pounder battery opposite him, and Major Rembowski's half-brigade's lack of activity. The Rembowski contingent was delayed by the disappearance of its commander. According to Colonel Jerzy Bulharyn's recollections, his fellow Polish man, Major Henryk Rembowski panicked at the first cannonball fired towards him and fled the battlefield. His comrades could only see him again during the retreat, hiding behind a haystack. The connection between the attack developing in the center and the right wing had to be provided by the 42nd Honvéd Battalion, which was part of the Dessewffy Brigade. It was ordered to attack the Congreve rocket battery operating from a covered position on the Akasztófa hill, to facilitate the advance of the center. In the course of this march of the Hungarian troops, Major Gablenz's detachment, following the dispositions of Schlik, attacked the rear of Perczel's troops, causing panic and disorder. The first to run was the mounted national guards from Heves, and they soon dragged the rest of the left wing with them. The resulting confusion and disorder soon spilled over to Pulszky's brigade, one of whose batteries, having just crossed the steep banks of the Miszlóka stream, tried to escape straight forward, but only to its loss, as its guns were stuck in the ditch one after another, whereupon the gunners cut the bindings, which bound the horses to the guns and carriages, and fled, leaving them behind so that a total of 10 guns and their ammunition wagons fell into enemy hands.

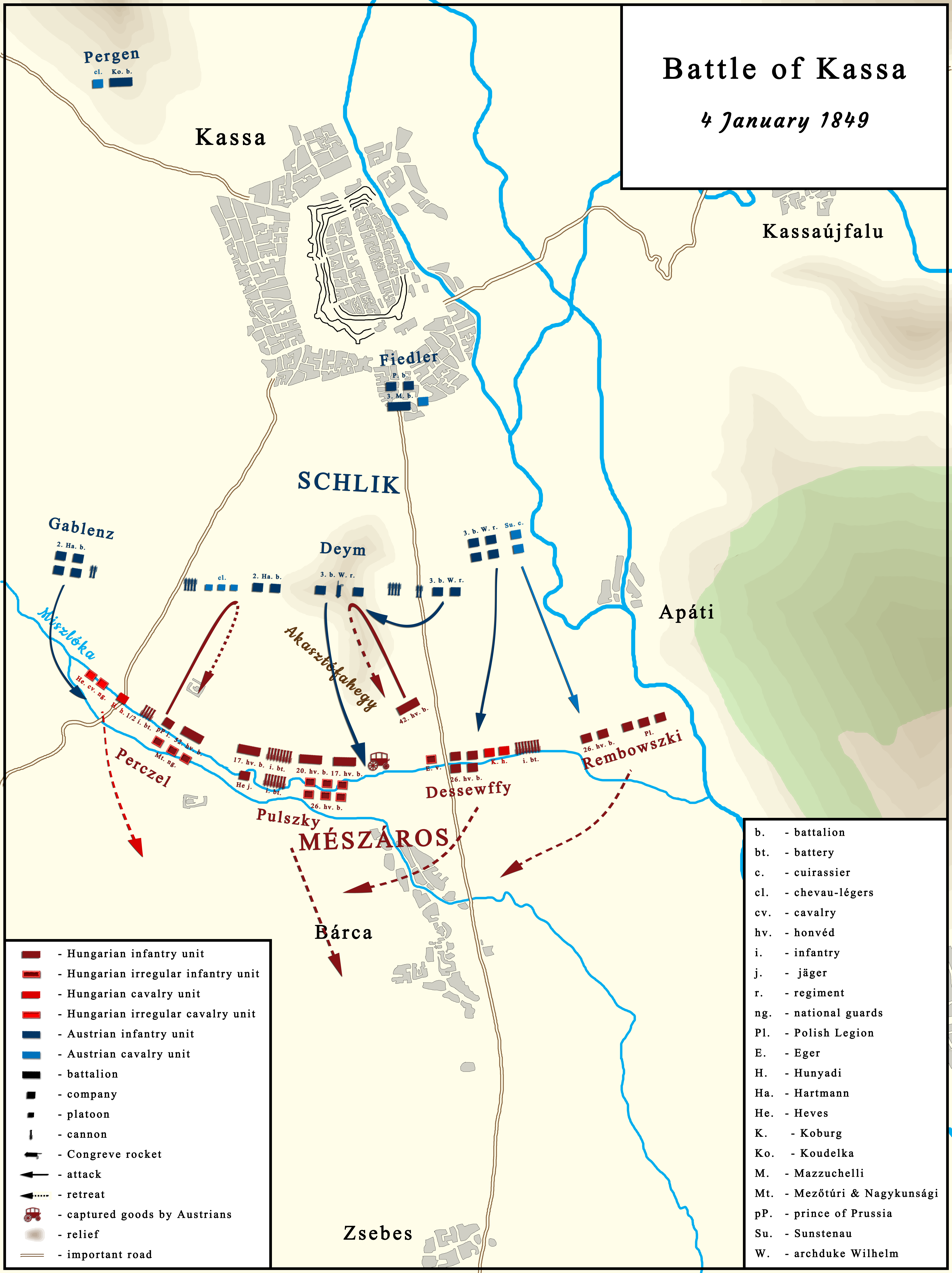
The Battle of Kassa 04.01.1849

Only the right flank, led by Aristid Dessewffy, withstood the enemy cannon fire. Dessewffy with the 26th Honvéd Battalion managed to stop the attack of the Imperial infantry, and with the Coburg Hussars he forced two enemy guns to retreat. Dessewffy's 42nd Hussars almost reached the enemy's rocket battery on the Akasztófa hill, when the Archduke Wilhelm infantry, which had been in reserve, countered the Honvéd attack in time and even repulsed it with a successful counterattack. At 3.30 p.m. Dessewffy's troops also wavered, but the Lieutenant-Colonel ordered the retreat to Enyicke in time, both for his own troops and for those of Major Rembowszky, who was fighting on his right. It was up to these units - the 26th, 20th Honvéd Battalions, 1 Company of the 17th Honvéd Battalion (the latter two were subordinated to Dessewffy after the centre had been routed), the Polish Legion and the Coburg Hussars - to cover the retreat of the whole corps. The biggest problem was the transfer of guns and ammunition wagons across the swift Miszlóka stream, which was made more difficult by the desperate fleeing of some troops, such as the Lehel Hussars, across the stream.

Mészáros tried to stop the routing soldiers, crying and begging to them, but it was all in vain. Although some corps held their own, the cavalry failed miserably. Once again it was proved that, despite their great number, the National Guard cavalry was practically unusable. The ruins of the Pulszky and Perczel brigades, which had already run away, withdraw to Abaújszina that same day. From Enyicke-Abaújszina, the corps retreated to Miskolc on 6 January, leaving its rear guard behind at Szikszó.

== Aftermath ==
In the battle of Kassa the Hungarians suffered considerable losses, 210 men were killed and wounded, and 20 officers and about 500 soldiers were taken prisoner. In addition, 10 guns, 6 artillery pieces, 1 flag and many weapons fell into the hands of the Austrians, whose losses were said to be only 3 dead, 13 wounded and 9 missing. The Hungarian losses seemed greater at first, but in the next days, many of those who were thought to be dead or captured came back to the camp.

Schlik was satisfied with his success, he did not think much of pursuit and did not move from Kassa for the time being. When Windisch-Grätz was informed of the victory, he renamed after Schlik the Hungarian war steamer Mészáros, which had fallen into the hands of the imperial troops in Pest.

Mészáros, who, before the start of the campaign, only barely accepted the command of the corps, after the battle asked for his dismissal. There was serious concern on the Hungarian side, because if Schlik had continued his advance, there would have been no force to stop him, especially given the fact that the Tisza line now became vital for the fate of the Hungarian struggle for freedom, as the government, after the imperial occupation of Pest, had moved its seat to Debrecen.

Schlik, however, did not even think of continuing the attack, all the more so because first he wanted to pacify the occupied territories, especially the Szepes region. Schlik heard the news about the occupation of Pest by Windisch-Grätz's main K.u.K. army on 8 January, and on that day he learned that about 4000 reinforcements and artillery were on their way to the Hungarian Upper Tisza corps, in order to be able to hold back Schlik's corps in the case if he wanted to attack. That is why Schlik did not obey Windisch-Grätz's order to liaise with the main forces via Losonc. His decision was reinforced also by the false news that the army was again preparing to attack Kassa, and Schlik believed these rumors.

On 9 January Kossuth appointed Colonel György Klapka to replace Mészáros. On 13 January he handed over command to Klapka in Miskolc and returned to Debrecen on 15 January.

Schlik only launched another attack in the second half of January 1849. On 22–23 January, his troops first encountered the Upper Tisza corps, reorganised by Klapka in the Battles Tarcal and Bodrogkeresztúr, but they were defeated, and forced to retreat. At the end of the month he received a division of reinforcements from Windisch-Grätz, and with this, he attacked again the Upper Tisza corps, which had meanwhile retreated to the Tisza line, at Tokaj on 31 January. However, Klapka's troops repelled this attack as well. In the meantime, Schlik was informed that General Artúr Görgei's Army of the Upper Danube was approaching Eperjes, so he retreated to Kassa. After the victory of Richard Guyon's Division at Branyiszkó on 5 February, Schlik was in danger of being annihilated in the pincer of Görgei's corps in the north and Klapka's in the south. Schlik, therefore, evacuated the city on 9 February and retreated westwards.

The Schlik Corps' two-month campaign in Upper Hungary was ultimately unsuccessful. The successes at Budamér and Kassa caused some problems for the Hungarian army, but were more of a temporary inconvenience, as Schlik was not strong enough to take advantage of the victories by crossing the Tisza and threatening Debrecen, the new seat of the Hungarian government. By the end of January, when he made a decisive move to cross the Tisza with reinforcements, it was too late. The reorganized, reinforced Upper Tisza Corps successfully repulsed these attempts.

== Sources ==
- Bánlaky, József (2001). A magyar nemzet hadtörténelme (The Military History of the Hungarian Nation XXI) (in Hungarian). Budapest: Arcanum Adatbázis.
- Hajagos József. Az 1848–49-es I. magyar hadtest iratai. Megalakulástól az 1849. január 4-i kassai vereségig ("The Documents of the I. Hungarian Corps. From its Foundation till the Defeat at Kassa"). Eger: A Heves Megyei Levéltár forráskiadványai 9., 2002. ISBN 963 7242 35 X
- Hermann, Róbert, ed. (1996). Az 1848–1849 évi forradalom és szabadságharc története ("The history of the Hungarian Revolution and War of Independence of 1848–1849) (in Hungarian). Budapest: Videopont. p. 464. ISBN 963-8218-20-7.
- Hermann, Róbert (2004). Az 1848–1849-es szabadságharc nagy csatái ("Great battles of the Hungarian Revolution of 1848–1849") (in Hungarian). Budapest: Zrínyi. p. 408. ISBN 963-327-367-6.
- Hermann, Róbert (2001). Az 1848–1849-es szabadságharc hadtörténete ("Military History of the Hungarian Revolution of 1848–1849") (in Hungarian). Budapest: Korona Kiadó. p. 424. ISBN 963-9376-21-3.
- Bóna, Gábor (1987). Tábornokok és törzstisztek a szabadságharcban 1848–49 ("Generals and Staff Officers in the War of Freedom 1848–1849") (in Hungarian). Budapest: Zrínyi Katonai Kiadó. p. 430. ISBN 963-326-343-3.
- Nobili, Johann. Hungary 1848: The Winter Campaign. Edited and translated Christopher Pringle. Warwick, UK: Helion & Company Ltd., 2021.
