= Tiszaújváros District =

District in Borsod-Abaúj-Zemplén, Hungary

Coordinates: 47.9333°N 21.0000°E

Tiszaújváros District Tiszaújvárosi járás
- Districts of Hungary
- Coat of arms

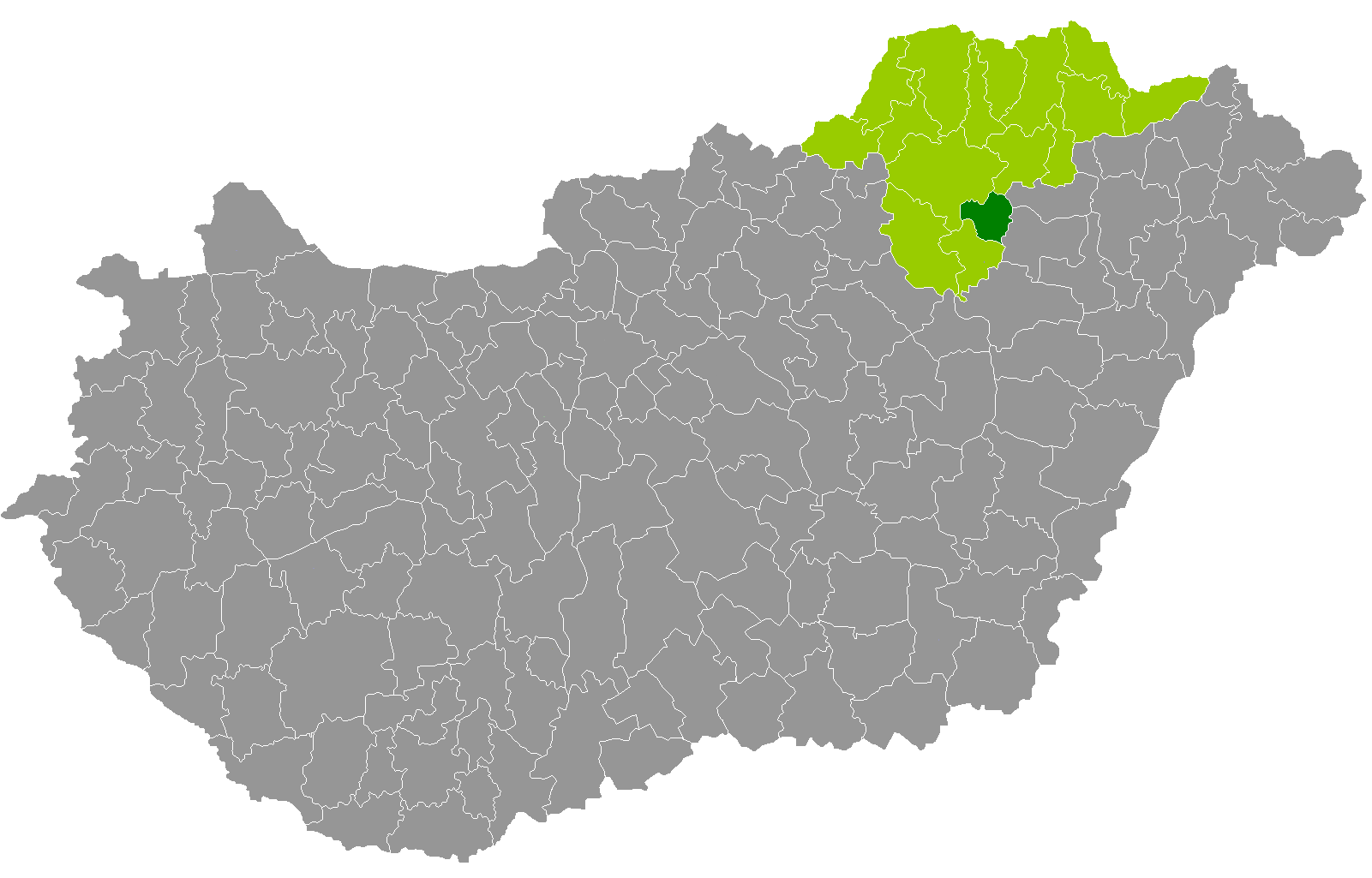
- Tiszaújváros District within Hungary and Borsod-Abaúj-Zemplén County.
- Country: Hungary
- County: Borsod-Abaúj-Zemplén
- District seat: Tiszaújváros

Area
  - Total: 248.87 km^{2} (96.09 sq mi)
  - Rank: 16th in Borsod-Abaúj-Zemplén

Population (2011 census)
  - Total: 31,842
  - Rank: 7th in Borsod-Abaúj-Zemplén
  - Density: 128/km^{2} (330/sq mi)

Tiszaújváros (Hungarian: Tiszaújvárosi járás) is a district in south-eastern part of Borsod-Abaúj-Zemplén County. Tiszaújváros is also the name of the town where the district seat is found. The district is located in the Northern Hungary Statistical Region.

== Geography ==
Tiszaújváros District borders with Szerencs District to the northeast, Tiszavasvári District (Szabolcs-Szatmár-Bereg County) and Hajdúnánás District (Hajdú-Bihar County) to the east, Mezőcsát District to the south, Miskolc District to the northwest. The number of the inhabited places in Tiszaújváros District is 16.

== Municipalities ==
The district has 1 town and 15 villages. (ordered by population, as of 1 January 2012)

- Girincs (917)
- Hejőbába (1,927)
- Hejőkeresztúr (948)
- Hejőkürt (315)
- Hejőszalonta (836)
- Kesznyéten (1,900)
- Kiscsécs (207)
- Muhi (533)
- Nagycsécs (776)
- Nemesbikk (995)
- Oszlár (392)
- Sajóörös (1,343)
- Sajószöged (2,265)
- Szakáld (519)
- Tiszapalkonya (1,407)
- **Tiszaújváros** (16,557) – district seat

The bolded municipality is the city.

== Demographics ==
Religion in Tiszaújváros District (2011 census)
1. Catholic Church (29.7%)
2. Greek Catholicism (3.50%)
3. Calvinism (18.0%)
4. Lutheranism (0.20%)
5. Other religions (0.90%)
6. Non-religious (17.2%)
7. Atheists (1.10%)
8. Undeclared (29.4%)

In 2011, it had a population of 31,842 and the population density was 128/km^{2}.

Year	County population	Change
2011	31,842	n/a

=== Ethnicity ===
Besides the Hungarian majority, the main minorities are the Roma (approx. 2,000) and German (150).

Total population (2011 census): 31,842
Ethnic groups (2011 census): Identified themselves: 29,552 persons:

- Hungarians: 27,032 (91.47%)
- Gypsies: 1,955 (6.62%)
- Others and indefinable: 565 (1.91%)

Approx. 2,000 persons in Tiszaújváros District did not declare their ethnic group at the 2011 census.

=== Religion ===
Religious adherence in the county according to 2011 census:

- Catholic – 10,549 (Roman Catholic – 9,443; Greek Catholic – 1,102);
- Reformed – 5,746;
- Evangelical – 55;
- other religions – 295;
- Non-religious – 5,479;
- Atheism – 338;
- Undeclared – 9,380.

== Gallery ==
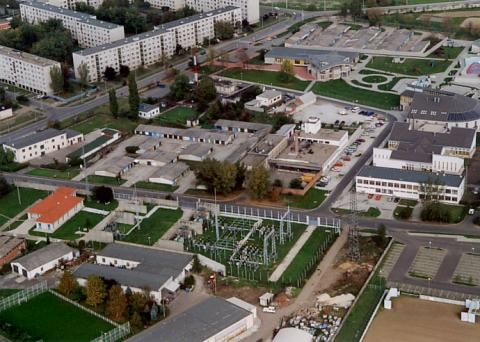
Tiszaújváros, the district seat

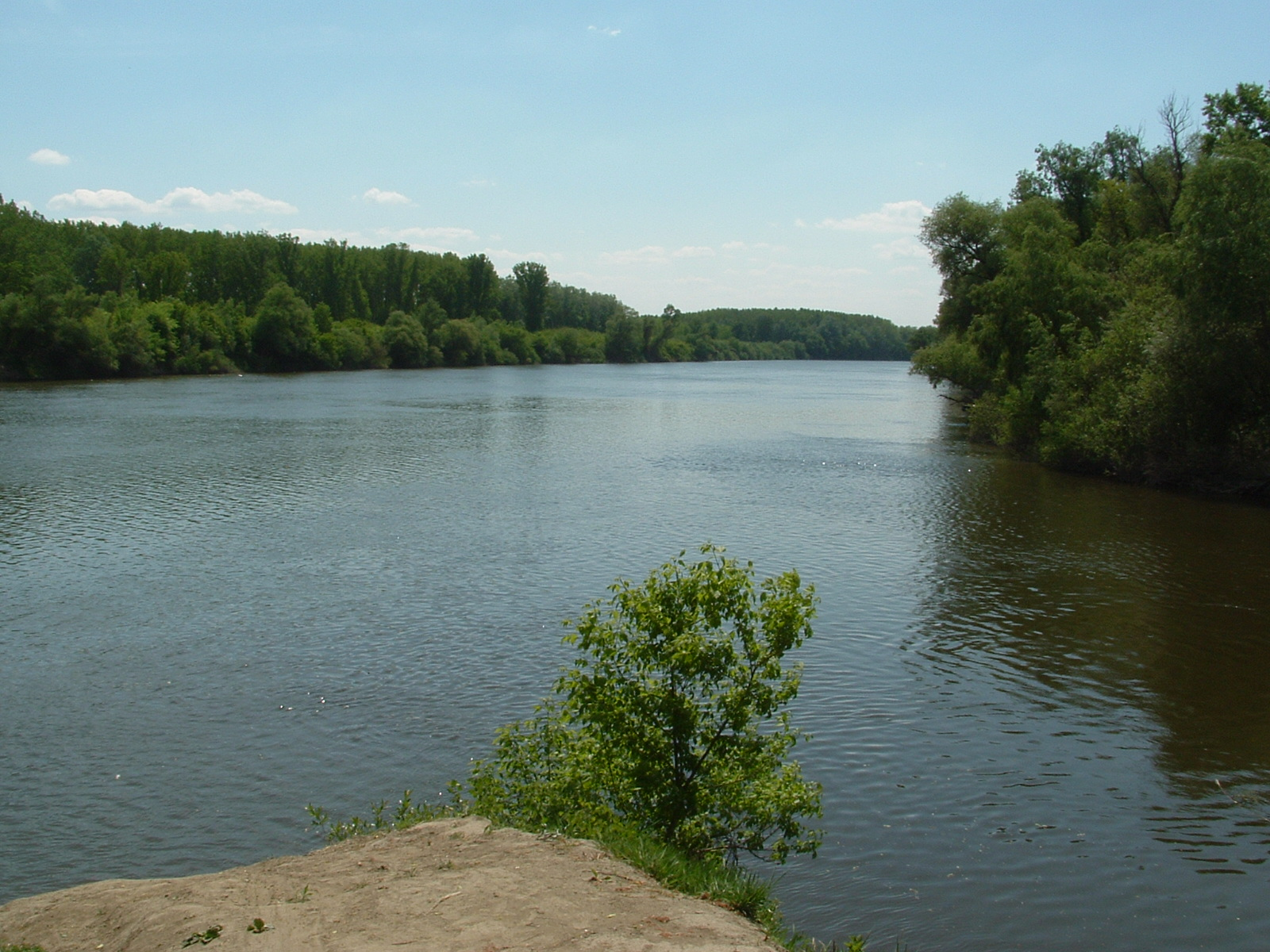
Conflux of the Tisza and Sajó river near Tiszaújváros

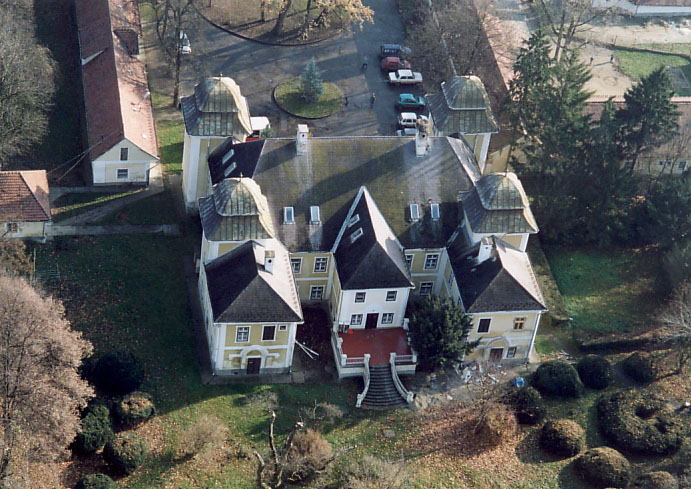
Dőry Mansion in Girincs

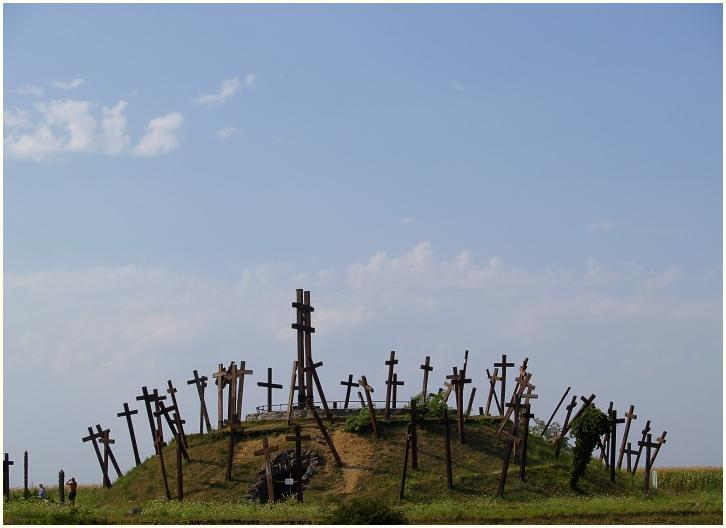
Memorial park near Muhi

== See also ==
- List of cities and towns of Hungary
