= Koncz =

Koncz is a Hungarian surname that may refer to

- Christoph Koncz (born 1987), Austrian violinist
- Ferenc Koncz (1959–2020), Hungarian teacher and politician
- Gábor Koncz (born 1938), Hungarian actor
- Zsolt Koncz (born 1977), Hungarian football player
- Zsuzsa Koncz (born 1946), Hungarian pop singer
