= Zoltán Bihari =

Hungarian politician

Member of the National Assembly
- Assuming office 9 May 2026
- Succeeding: Zsófia Koncz
- Constituency: Borsod-Abaúj-Zemplén 6th

Personal details
- Party: Tisza

Zoltán Bihari is a Hungarian politician who was elected member of the National Assembly in 2026 representing the Borsod-Abaúj-Zemplén County 6th constituency. He previously worked as an ecologist.
