= 2020 Tiszaújváros by-election =

Election in Hungary

2021 Tiszaújváros by-election
- 11 October 2020

Tiszaújváros constituency
- Turnout: 45,51%
	First party	Second party
Candidate	Zsófia Koncz	László Bíró
Party	Fidesz-KDNP	Jobbik
Last election	49.3%	31,64%
Popular vote	17,700	16,213
Percentage	50,51%	46,27%
Swing	▲1.18%	▲14,63%
- Boundary of Borsod 6
MP before election
Ferenc Koncz
Fidesz
Elected MP
Zsófia Koncz
Fidesz

The 2020 by-elections in Tiszaújváros, Hungary were held on 11 October 2020 in Borsod-Abaúj-Zemplén County No. 6. in the individual constituency of the Parliament. The election had to be called due to the death of Ferenc Koncz, a Member of Parliament in the constituency.

The main stake in the election was whether the Fidesz could maintain a two-thirds majority in the parliament. Until the death of Ferenc Koncz, the Fidesz–KDNP coalition had 133 members - 66.8 percent of all members - in the 199-member Parliament, and thus the loss of a single member would have meant that the governing coalition would not have been able to pass key laws without opposition members. (In practice, this is of little significance because three members of the Our Homeland Movement outside the governing coalition and Imre Ritter, a German national, would have had a good chance of voting with the Fidesz–KDNP.)

Zsófia Koncz, the daughter of the deceased, ran in the elections as a candidate for Fidesz–KDNP, and Ádám Tóth and Gábor Váradi ran as independent. The party coalition called "opposition coalition" supported László Bíró of Jobbik. Erika Bukta Sóváriné is a candidate for the Democratic Party. The registration of the independent István Medve was rejected by the election committee because it failed to collect 500 valid signatures on the recommendation forms.

In the end, Zsófia Koncz won the election by a slim, but increased four percent majority.
