= Imre Horváth (Hungarian politician, born 1944) =

Hungarian politician (1944–2021)

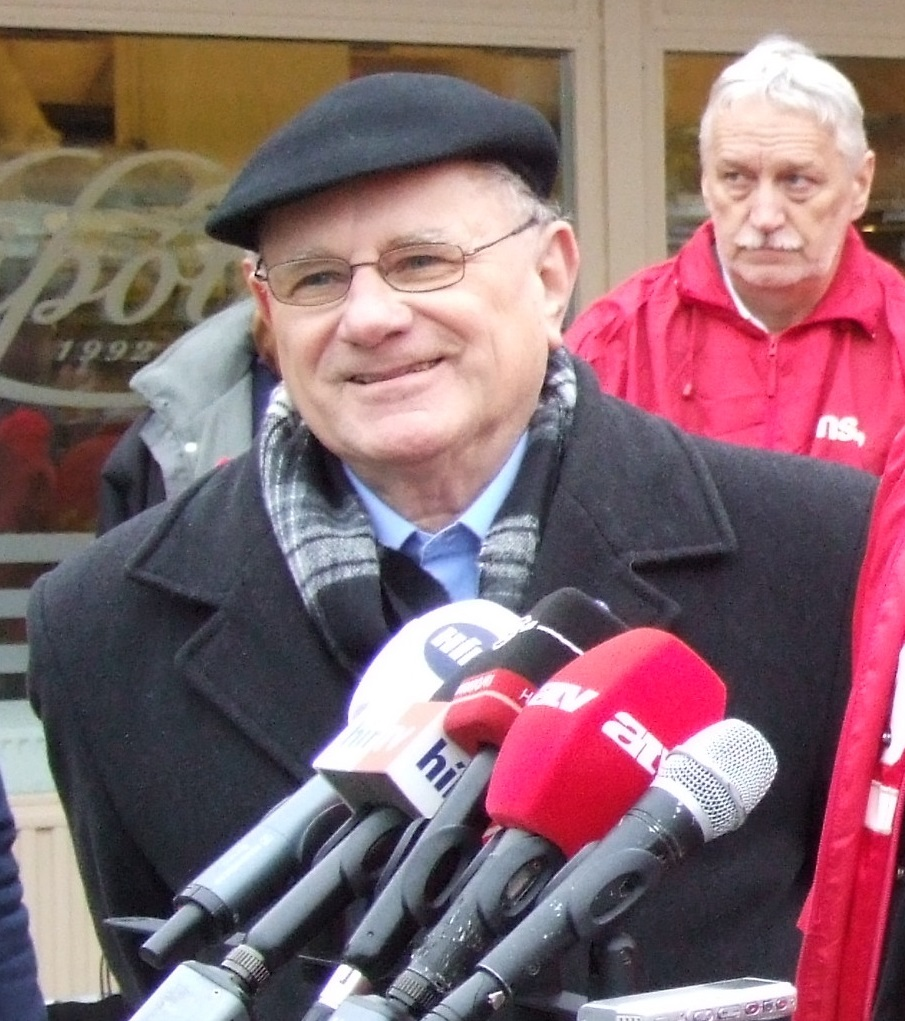
Imre Horváth in 2014

Imre Horváth (28 June 1944 – 27 April 2021) was a Hungarian politician. He was a member of the National Assembly of Hungary in the Budapest 11 constituency for the Hungarian Socialist Party from 2014 to 2018. He was elected in a by-election, following the death of fellow party member Péter Kiss.

On 22 November 2017, Imre Horváth announced, he quit the MSZP, because the party did not nominate him as candidate in the 2018 Hungarian parliamentary election in Újpest. Later Imre Horváth announced to the Index, that he was not entering other political parties, he was running as an independent in 2018, in Újpest. He received 2.34 percent of the vote during the election, thus lost his parliamentary seat.
