= Szentistvánbaksa =

- Village
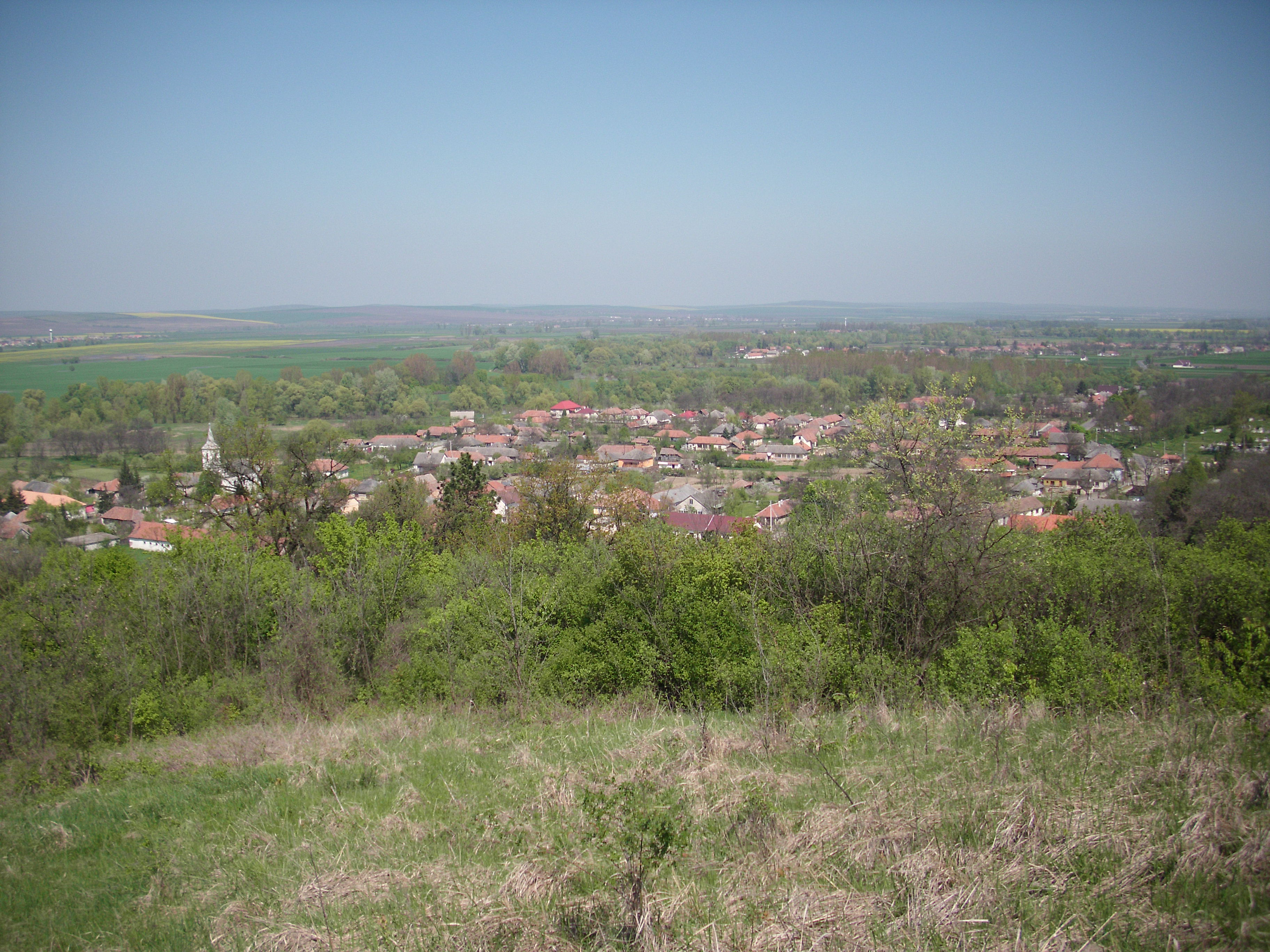
- Szentistvánbaksa - panoramio
- Interactive map of Szentistvánbaksa
- Coordinates: 48°13′20″N 21°01′40″E
- Country: Hungary
- Regions: Northern Hungary
- County: Borsod-Abaúj-Zemplén County
- Time zone: UTC+1 (CET)
  - Summer (DST): UTC+2 (CEST)

Szentistvánbaksa is a village in the middle of Borsod-Abaúj-Zemplén County in northeastern Hungary, in short Baksa. It stands in a hilly area in the valley of the river Hernád, immediately south of Nagykinisz, between the Main roads 3 and 37, northeast of Miskolc and Szikszó, and northwest of Szerencs and Megyaszó.

The number of inhabitants in the village is between 200 and 300.

== Etymology ==
=== Baksa ===
There are two etymological theories for the village name. According to the first, the charcoal burners who settled down in the area's oak and beech forests, piled up the shredded wood in a hemispheric shape, creating the so-called boksas. According to the second, the name of the village is derived from the Hungarian term baksózó, used for the feeding of salt to goats (in past centuries, there were many goats in the region, their milk and meat being used for nutrition before cows became widespread). This term consists of bak, male goat, and sózás, giving salt to someone.

=== Szent István ===
"Szentistván" comes from "Szent István", Hungarian for "Saint Stephen", the religious title used for the king who founded the Christian kingdom of Hungary, Stephen I.

== History ==
Szentistvánbaksa is located in Borsod-Abaúj-Zemplén County, which used to be Abaúj-Torna County. It was the oldest settlement of Abaúj County.

The name Baksa/Baxa can be found on an anonymous charter from 1262. The inhabitants were castle warriors at that time (this institution was disbanded in the 14th century).

Szentistvánbaksa is a significant archaeological site of Borsod-Abaúj-Zempén county. Multiple burial chambers were found in the fields over Baksa. They date to the 2nd or 3rd century BC and from the Avar culture. The largest of them is called the Avar-hill. in the 1930s people from the archaeological section of the Hermann Ottó Museum carried out research in the biggest hill – crypt – which still stands 10 meters above the field which it is surrounded by. (Most of the hills are already covered by the fields and they are not really visible by the naked eye, but one can make out their outlines using Google Earth). Ceramic dishes and Avar weapons were found. Still in the fields one can find many ceramic pieces. Sometimes ploughs uncover pieces of stone from the ground, which were carried there by the Avars from the mountains.

Szentistvánbaksa had a mill in 1320, which is the proof of grain production.

In 1576 the village's landlord is Imre Appony, with whom the village converted to the reformed religion. In 1608 Szentistvánbaksa belongs to the Reformed diocese of Abaúj. In 1627 in the country's record book its name is written as Lower-Baksa or Szent-István-Baksa. In 1635 the settlement was ravaged by the Turkish, and its inhabitants fled. The next centuries had been a struggle for the people. During the Rákóczi Insurrection barely anybody lived here.

In the 18th century the village was resettled with reformed Hungarians. 1833 it had a reformed church, a synagogue, 90 houses and 691 inhabitants, as well as one flour mill.

During the First World War, 11 people died a heroic death. Their memorial can be found at the beginning of the cemetery.

== Activities ==
In the ”village house” one can see an exhibition of old household objects from the village. Occasional ceremonies are also held here, handcraft activities for children, singing or reading out poems on the Day of Poetry.

Around the 20th of August the inhabitants of the village usually celebrate the founding of the state by St. Stephen with singing and dancing performances and slicing and eating bread, which is the symbol of the founding of the state.

== Access ==
Szentistvánbaksa can be accessed via car on Main Road 3. It is connected to Miskolc and surrounding villages via Volán buses. The Halmaj train station is situated only 5 kilometres from Szentistvánbaksa, so it may also be accessed by rail. The village is also accesable via kayak, canoe, or other personal watercraft via the nearby river; such travel is very popular among outdoorsmen and women. The riverbank and surrounding areas are left to grow wild, and known for being naturally beautiful. It is enjoyed by visitors for activities including hiking, fishing, and relaxing near the waterfront. In summer, it is also a popular venue for swimming.
