= Sokoľany =

Village and municipality in Slovakia

- Municipality
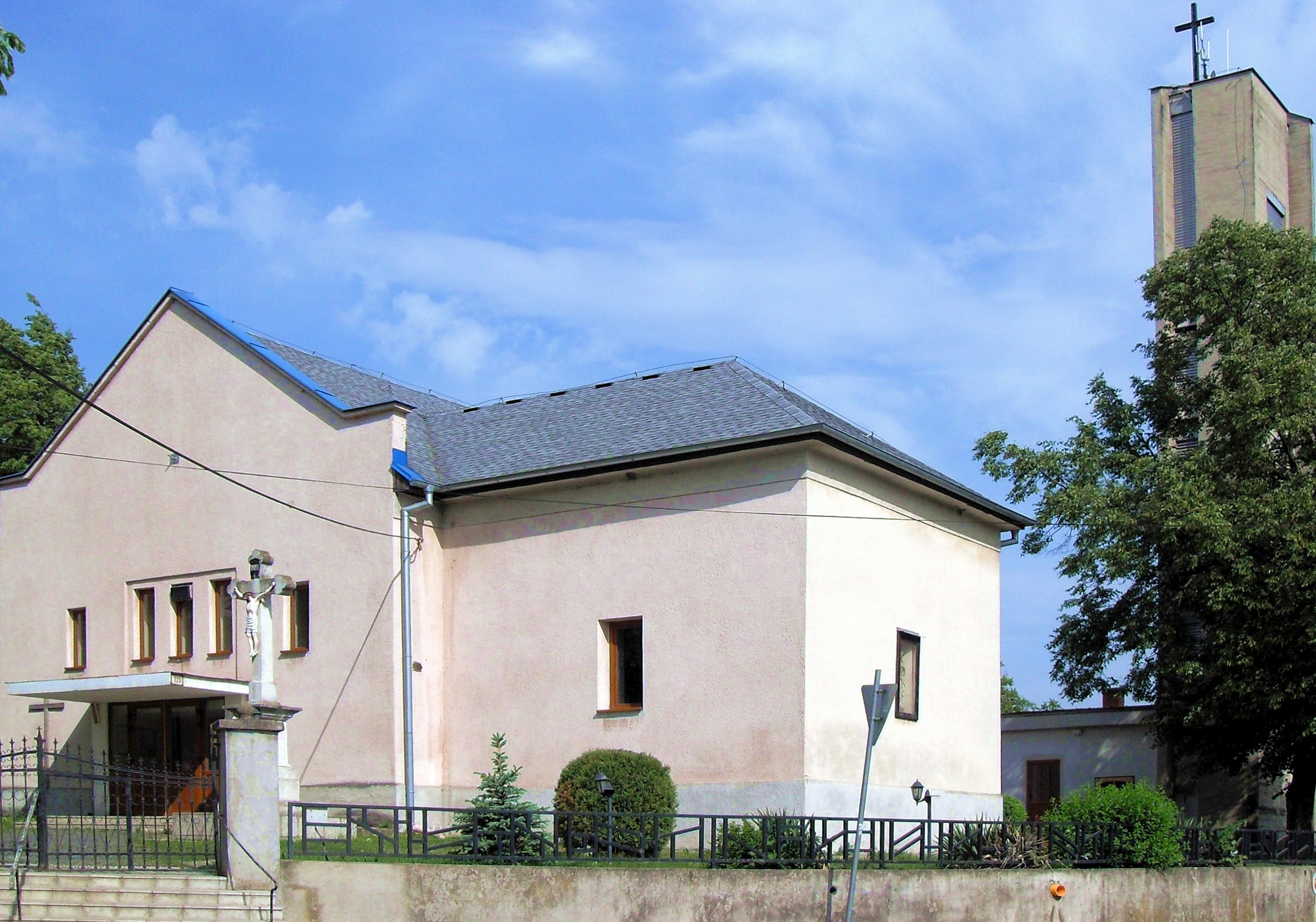

- Flag

- Location of Sokoľany in the Košice Region Location of Sokoľany in Slovakia
- Coordinates: 48.62°N 21.23°E
- Country: Slovakia
- Region: Košice Region
- District: Košice-okolie District
- First mentioned: 1251

Area
  - Total: 3.85 km^{2} (1.49 sq mi)
- Elevation: 213 m (699 ft)

Population (2025)
  - Total: 1,359
- Time zone: UTC+1 (CET)
  - Summer (DST): UTC+2 (CEST)
- Postal code: 445 6
- Area code: +421 55
- Vehicle registration plate (until 2022): KS
- Website: obecsokolany.sk

Sokoľany is a village and municipality in Košice-okolie District in the Košice Region of eastern Slovakia. Between 1961 and 1990, it was connected with its neighbouring village, Bočiar, forming the village of Hutníky.

== History ==
=== Name ===
The name likely comes from the word "sokol" (falcon), which is supported by documents as early as 1251 (villa Zocol). The village became Hungarianized and the name changed (e.g. Sokol, Zakul, Szakaly, Abaújszakaly).

== Geography ==
The village lies in the south of the Košice basin on the Sokolianský potok. The cleared land is on the terrace plateau of the Hornád River, the western part on the alluvial cone of the Ida stream, deposited on Tertiary sediments.

The municipality lies at an altitude of 213 metres (699 ft) and covers an area of 3.85 km^{2} (1.49 sq mi) (2025).

The territory lies in a continental climate zone characterized as warm, moderately humid, with cold winters. Annual rainfall 600 mm, moisture deficit 284 mm. Soil type is brown earth on loess and loess loams.

=== Sokoliansky potok (brook) ===
In the past it originated in Zlatá Idka, dividing Sokoľany into 2 sides, east and west (named Kis Szakaly and Nagy Szakaly on the cadastral map of 1869 (small and large Sokoľany) At that time it was much larger, in the meadow “Berek” south of the village it drove the Sokoliansky mill, and fed several manor ponds, which were owned by the local landowners. In 1868 was the mill dismantled and the ponds gradually dried up.

== Government ==
The village relies on the tax and district offices and fire brigade at Košice.

== Transport ==
The nearest railway station is located 1 kilometre away.

== Population ==
Population statistic (10 years)
Year	1995	2005	2015	2025
Count	1014	1137	1318	1359
Difference		+12.13%	+15.91%	+3.11%

Population statistic
Year	2024	2025
Count	1358	1359
Difference		+0.07%

It has a population of 1359 people (31 December 2025).

=== Ethnicity ===
Census 2021 (1+ %)
Ethnicity	Number	Fraction
Slovak	1233	90.59%
Romani	95	6.98%
Not found out	89	6.53%
Total	1361	

In year 2021 was 1361 people by ethnicity 1233 as Slovak, 95 as Romani, 89 as Not found out, 5 as Czech, 2 as Hungarian, 1 as Serbian, 1 as Russian and 1 as Polish.

Note on population: The difference values of population numbers in the table "Population statistic" and in the sections "Ethnicity" & "Religion" is caused by the use of various statistical methods.

=== Religion ===
Census 2021 (1+ %)
Religion	Number	Fraction
Roman Catholic Church	1062	78.03%
None	137	10.07%
Not found out	87	6.39%
Greek Catholic Church	51	3.75%
Total	1361	

In year 2021 was 1361 people by religion 1062 from Roman Catholic Church, 137 from None, 87 from Not found out, 51 from Greek Catholic Church, 8 from Evangelical Church, 7 from Jehovah's Witnesses, 4 from Christian Congregations in Slovakia, 2 from Calvinist Church, 1 from Paganism and natural spirituality, 1 from Islam and 1 from Ad hoc movements.
