= Taktabáj =

Coordinates: 48°04′N 21°19′E

- Village
- Interactive map of Taktabáj
- Country: Hungary
- Regions: Northern Hungary
- County: Borsod-Abaúj-Zemplén County
- Time zone: UTC+1 (CET)
  - Summer (DST): UTC+2 (CEST)

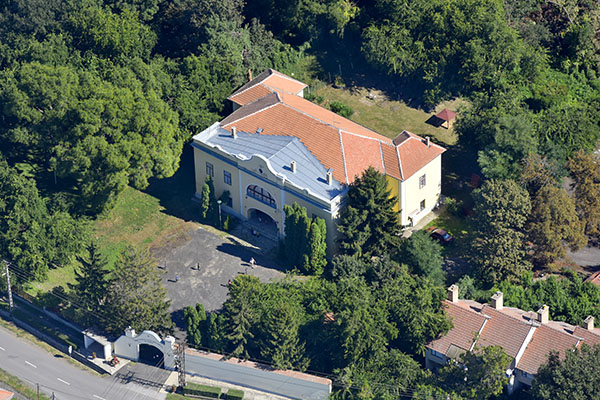
Taktabáj

Taktabáj is a village in Borsod-Abaúj-Zemplén County in northeastern Hungary. The population based on 2022 census data was 590.
