= Ždaňa =

Village and municipality in Slovakia

Ždaňa Ždaňa
- Municipality
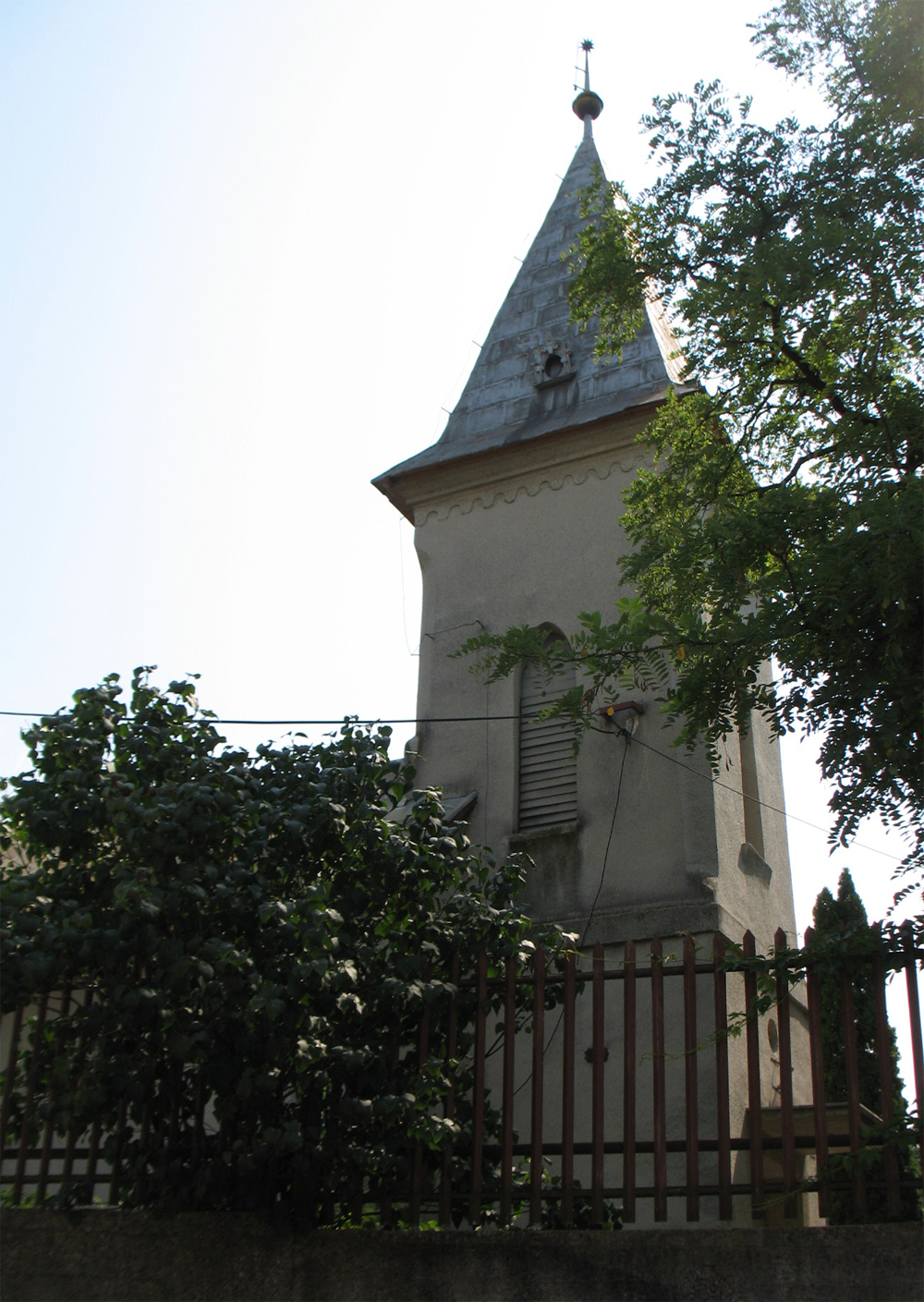

- Flag Coat of arms

- Location of Ždaňa in the Košice Region Location of Ždaňa in Slovakia
- Coordinates: 48.60°N 21.35°E
- Country: Slovakia
- Region: Košice Region
- District: Košice-okolie District
- First mentioned: 1270

Area
  - Total: 5.56 km^{2} (2.15 sq mi)
- Elevation: 178 m (584 ft)

Population (2025)
  - Total: 1,334
- Time zone: UTC+1 (CET)
  - Summer (DST): UTC+2 (CEST)
- Postal code: 441 1
- Area code: +421 55
- Vehicle registration plate (until 2022): KS
- Website: www.zdana.sk

Ždaňa is a village and municipality in Košice-okolie District in the Kosice Region of eastern Slovakia. The village has a population of around 1,400.

== History ==
In historical records the village was first mentioned in 1222.

== Geography ==
The municipality lies at an altitude of 178 metres (584 ft) and covers an area of 5.56 km^{2} (2.15 sq mi) (2025).

== Transport ==
The nearest railway station is at Čaňa.

== Population ==
Population statistic (10 years)
Year	1995	2005	2015	2025
Count	1338	1306	1396	1334
Difference		−2.39%	+6.89%	−4.44%

Population statistic
Year	2024	2025
Count	1350	1334
Difference		−1.18%

It has a population of 1334 people (31 December 2025).

=== Ethnicity ===
Census 2021 (1+ %)
Ethnicity	Number	Fraction
Slovak	1270	91.82%
Not found out	105	7.59%
Romani	38	2.74%
Total	1383	

In year 2021 was 1383 people by ethnicity 1270 as Slovak, 105 as Not found out, 38 as Romani, 13 as Hungarian, 5 as Rusyn, 2 as Czech, 2 as German and 1 as Other.

Note on population: The difference values of population numbers in the table "Population statistic" and in the sections "Ethnicity" & "Religion" is caused by the use of various statistical methods.

=== Religion ===
Census 2021 (1+ %)
Religion	Number	Fraction
Roman Catholic Church	932	67.39%
Calvinist Church	176	12.73%
None	111	8.03%
Not found out	101	7.3%
Greek Catholic Church	22	1.59%
Total	1383	

In year 2021 was 1383 people by religion 932 from Roman Catholic Church, 176 from Calvinist Church, 111 from None, 101 from Not found out, 22 from Greek Catholic Church, 13 from Evangelical Church, 9 from Eastern Orthodox Church, 7 from Ad hoc movements, 4 from Christian Congregations in Slovakia, 4 from Other, 1 from Old Catholic Church, 1 from Paganism and natural spirituality, 1 from Jehovah's Witnesses and 1 from Buddhism.
