= Újcsanálos =

- Village
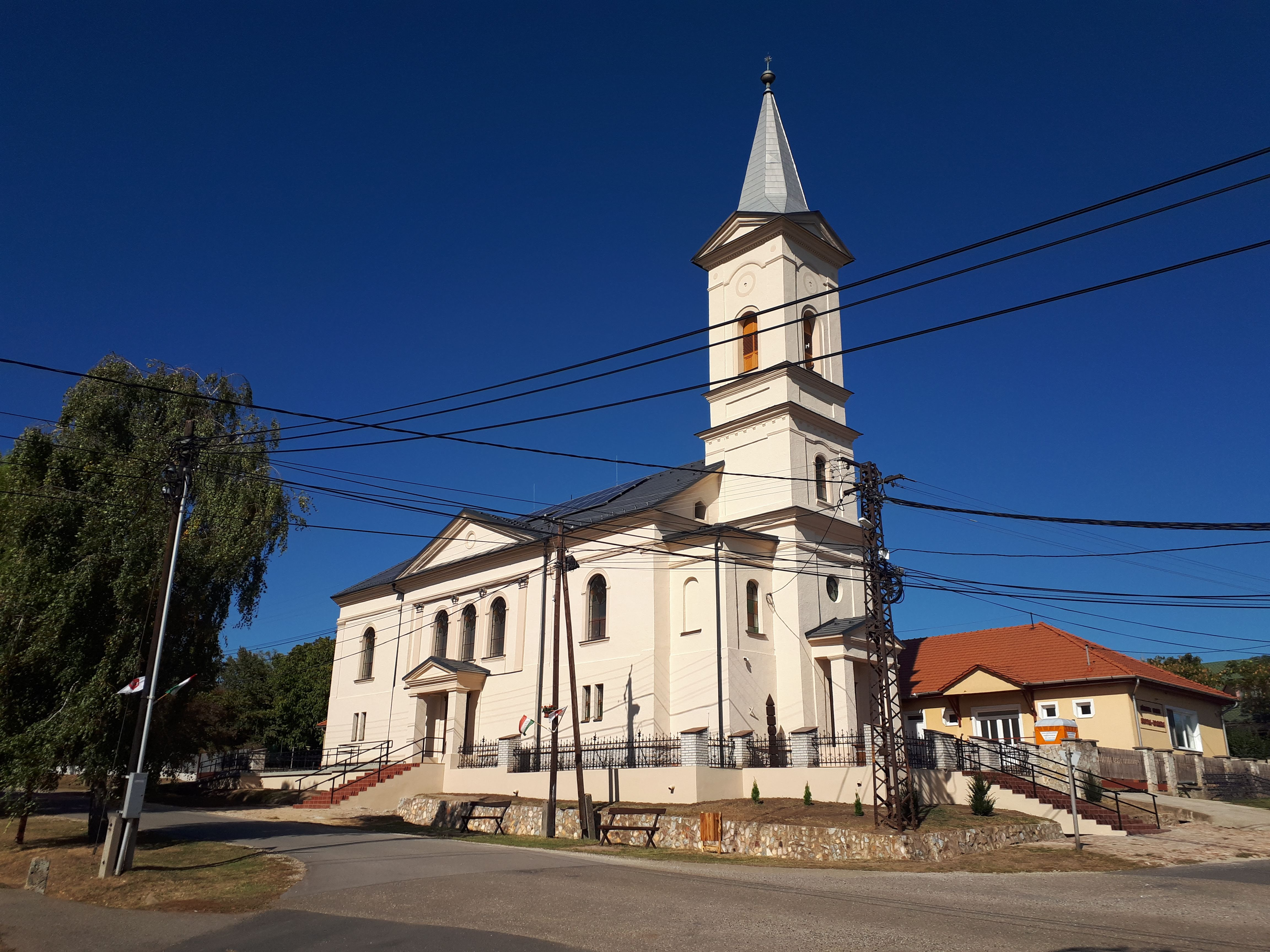

- Coat of arms
- Interactive map of Újcsanálos
- Coordinates: 48°08′N 21°01′E
- Country: Hungary
- Regions: Northern Hungary
- County: Borsod-Abaúj-Zemplén County

Government
  - Mayor: István Perge

Area
  - Total: 122 km^{2} (47 sq mi)

Population (2015)
  - Total: 861
- Time zone: UTC+1 (CET)
  - Summer (DST): UTC+2 (CEST)
- Website: http://ujcsanaloskozseg.blogspot.hu

The village of Újcsanálos is located in the county of Borsod-Abaúj-Zemplén, in the Miskolc district, in the valley of the Hernád river, the same distance from Miskolc and Szerencs, which is part of the historic Zemplén county, including the Harangod region.

== History ==
Its first written mention is from 1352 by the name "Chanalus", which was in the possession of the Czudar family then. Over the next few centuries, only a few cases have taken place in the possession of the territory until the village's destruction in the Turkish invasion's era. During the XVI-XVII. century, the village become deserted, people only came back after the Turkish were chased out. In 1865, due to the several floods of the River Hernád, some of the inhabitants of the settlement called Hernádcsanálos moved to a more protected place in the area of today's Újcsanálos. The latter name was given to the village in 1904, and the former one Hernádcsanálos became known as Ócsanálos.

== Ethnic groups ==
According to the data of the 2001 Hungarian census, the settlement has only Hungarian population.

== Population ==
We can see that the population of the village is not more than 900, but it is more than 850.

For example: in 2013, 893 people lived in the village, by 2014, only 857, and in 2015, the village had 861 inhabitants,

== Sights ==
One of its most famous sights is the Reformed church, which was built in 1907. There is also a World War monument in the garden of the mayor's office.

== Notes ==
1. Results of a newcomer settlement election (in Hungarian) (html). National Election Office, October 12, 2014 (Access: November 22, 2016)
2. Central Administration of the Republic of Hungary, January 1, 2015 (in Hungarian and English). Central Statistical Office, September 3, 2015 (Access: September 4, 2015)
3. The number of nationalities in 2001
