= Zlatá Idka =

Zlatá Idka Aranyida
- Municipality
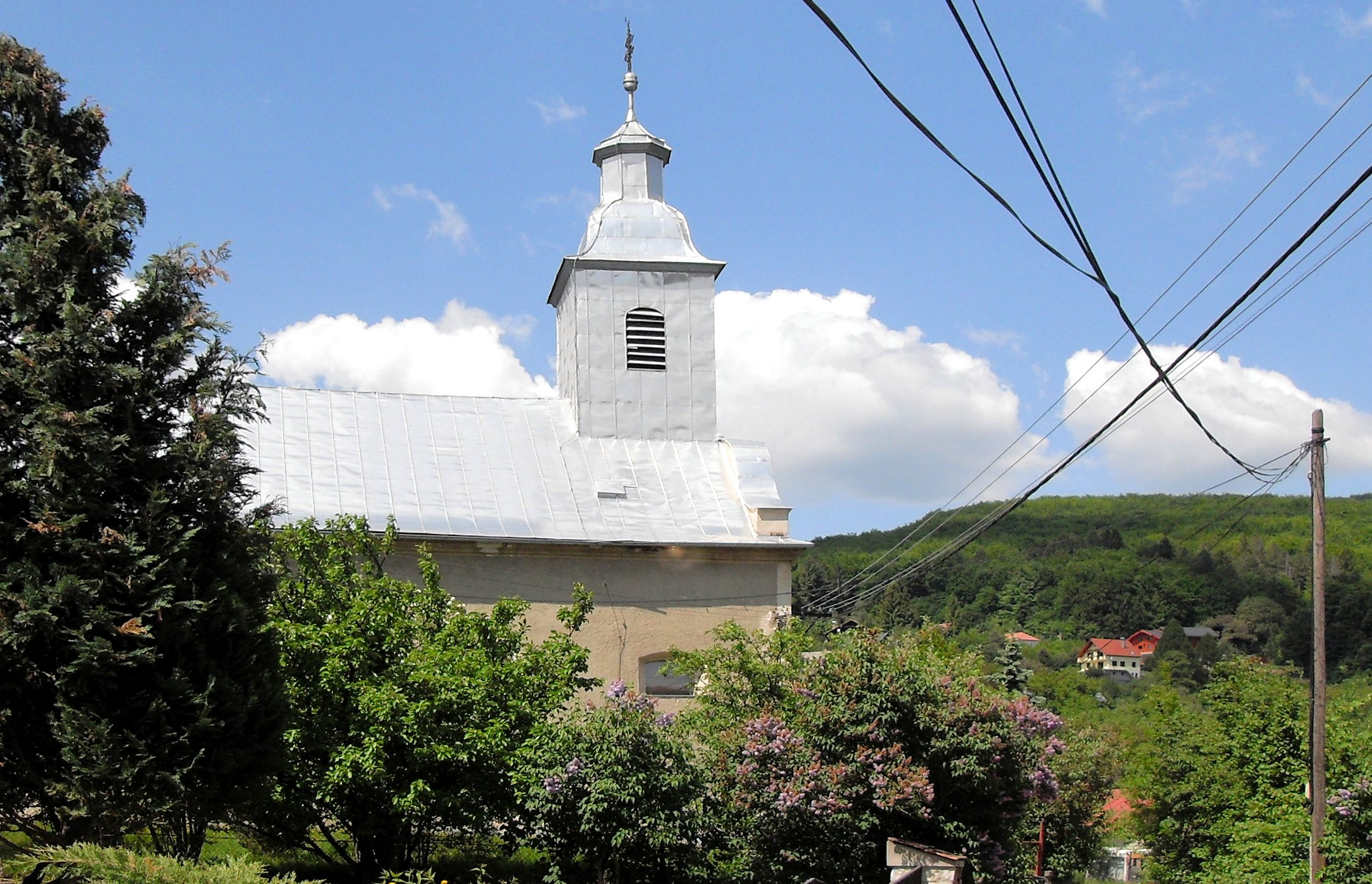
- Church of All Saints

- Flag

- Location of Zlatá Idka in the Košice Region Location of Zlatá Idka in Slovakia
- Coordinates: 48.75°N 21.01°E
- Country: Slovakia
- Region: Košice Region
- District: Košice-okolie District
- First mentioned: 1349

Government
  - Mayor: Roman Beličák

Area
  - Total: 16.21 km^{2} (6.26 sq mi)
- Elevation: 662 m (2,172 ft)

Population (2025)
  - Total: 439
- Time zone: UTC+1 (CET)
  - Summer (DST): UTC+2 (CEST)
- Postal code: 446 1
- Area code: +421 55
- Vehicle registration plate (until 2022): KS
- Website: obeczlataidka.sk

Zlatá Idka (German: Goldeneidten; Hungarian: Aranyida) is a village and municipality in Košice-okolie District in the Košice Region of eastern Slovakia.

== History ==
In historical records, the village was first mentioned in 1349 (Ida) when German miners (cives et hospites ac montani de eadem Ida) established here for overworking local gold and silver mines.

== Geography ==
The municipality lies at an altitude of 662 metres (2,172 ft) and covers an area of 16.21 km^{2} (6.26 sq mi) (2025).

== Transport ==
The nearest railway station is at Košice.

== Population ==
Population statistic (10 years)
Year	1995	2005	2015	2025
Count	349	345	405	439
Difference		−1.14%	+17.39%	+8.39%

Population statistic
Year	2024	2025
Count	432	439
Difference		+1.62%

It has a population of 439 people (31 December 2025).

=== Ethnicity ===
Census 2021 (1+ %)
Ethnicity	Number	Fraction
Slovak	369	94.13%
Not found out	13	3.31%
Czech	8	2.04%
Hungarian	7	1.78%
Total	392	

In year 2021 was 392 people by ethnicity 369 as Slovak, 13 as Not found out, 8 as Czech, 7 as Hungarian, 3 as Romani, 2 as Rusyn, 2 as Other and 1 as Polish.

Note on population: The difference values of population numbers in the table "Population statistic" and in the sections "Ethnicity" & "Religion" is caused by the use of various statistical methods.

=== Religion ===
Census 2021 (1+ %)
Religion	Number	Fraction
Roman Catholic Church	253	64.54%
None	78	19.9%
Not found out	17	4.34%
Greek Catholic Church	11	2.81%
Evangelical Church	8	2.04%
Apostolic Church	8	2.04%
Baptists Church	5	1.28%
Total	392	

In year 2021 was 392 people by religion 253 from Roman Catholic Church, 78 from None, 17 from Not found out, 11 from Greek Catholic Church, 8 from Evangelical Church, 8 from Apostolic Church, 5 from Baptists Church, 3 from Hinduism, 3 from United Methodist Church, 3 from Ad hoc movements, 2 from Calvinist Church and 1 from Christian Congregations in Slovakia.
