= Sajószöged =

- Village
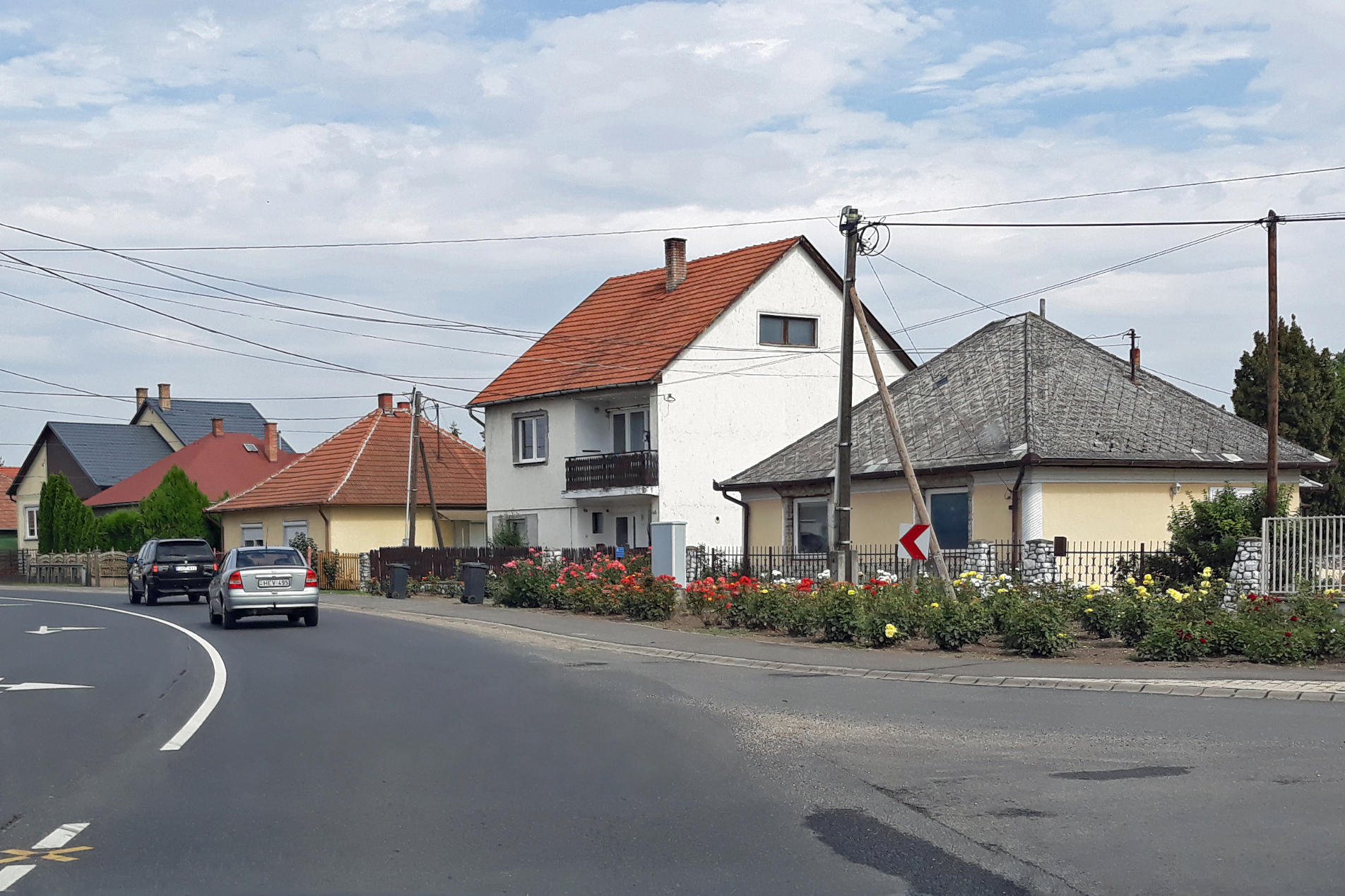

- Flag Coat of arms

- Location of Sajószöged
- Coordinates: 47.94592°N 20.99545°E
- Country: Hungary
- Region: Northern Hungary
- County: Borsod-Abaúj-Zemplén
- District: Tiszaújváros

Area
  - Total: 13.62 km^{2} (5.26 sq mi)

Population (1 January 2025)
  - Total: 2,349
  - Density: 172.5/km^{2} (446.7/sq mi)
- Time zone: UTC+1 (CET)
  - Summer (DST): UTC+2 (CEST)
- Postal code: 3599
- Area code: (+36) 49
- Website: sajoszoged.hu

Sajószöged is a village in Borsod-Abaúj-Zemplén County in northeastern Hungary.
