= Oszlár =

- Village
- Flag Coat of arms

- Location of Oszlár
- Coordinates: 47.87231°N 21.03574°E
- Country: Hungary
- Region: Northern Hungary
- County: Borsod-Abaúj-Zemplén
- District: Tiszaújváros

Area
  - Total: 5.71 km^{2} (2.20 sq mi)

Population (1 January 2025)
  - Total: 296
  - Density: 51.8/km^{2} (134/sq mi)
- Time zone: UTC+1 (CET)
  - Summer (DST): UTC+2 (CEST)
- Postal code: 3591
- Area code: (+36) 49
- Website: oszlar.hu

Oszlár is a village in Borsod-Abaúj-Zemplén County in northeastern Hungary.
