= Andor Nagy =

Hungarian politician (born 1963)

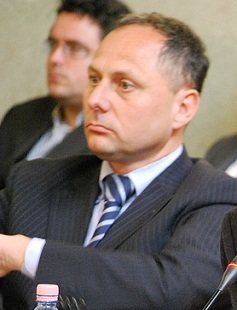

Member of the National Assembly
- In office 13 December 2004 – 22 August 2013

Personal details
- Born: 25 February 1963 (age 63) Csorna, Hungary
- Party: Fidesz (since 1988)
- Other political affiliations: KDNP
- Spouse: Mariann Bercsényi
- Children: Franciska Eszter; Júlia Boglárka
- Profession: jurist, politician

Andor Nagy (born 25 February 1963) is a Hungarian jurist and politician, member of the National Assembly (MP) for Szécsény (Nógrád County Constituency III) between 2004 and 2013. He was appointed Hungarian Ambassador to Israel in August 2013. He was accredited as Ambassador of the Republic of Hungary to Austria on 19 September 2018.

== Biography ==
He finished his secondary studies in Győr. He studied law at the Eötvös Loránd University (ELTE) in Budapest, where attended the Bibó István College for Advanced Studies, a special honors society/extracurricular studies program since 1983. Nagy was a dorm roommate of Viktor Orbán. During the transition process in Hungary, the party of Fidesz emerged from that student organization in 1988, of which he was also a founding member. On completion his university studies he shared in the Soros Scholarship. In 1988 he was a legal officer for the Present Co-operative, later for the Department of the Exchange of flats in the Budapest City Council in the same year. From 1989 to 1993 he studied law and sociology at Freie Universität Berlin. Between 1994 and 1995 he was a lawyer-candidate, later passed the corporate attorney examination. In 2004 he studied at the Harvard Business School in Boston.

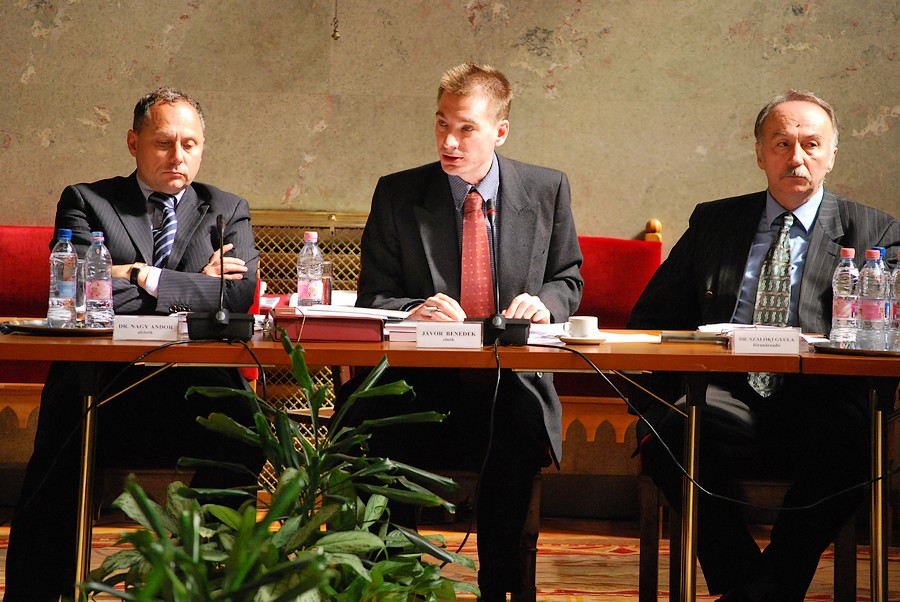
Nagy (left) with Benedek Jávor and Gyula Szalóki in 2010

In the 1994 local elections he was an individual representative-candidate in Terézváros (District VI, Budapest). He has been co-president of the Joint Venture Association for two years. He received Cross of the Legion of Honour in 2001. He was co-president of the Hungarian-Baden-Württemberg Joint Commission from 2001. He was decorated with "Staufermedaille" by Minister-President of Baden-Württemberg.

He was the desk officer for German affairs in the cabinet of party president Orbán from 1993 until beginning of his lawyer-candidate practice. From 1995 to 1998 he worked for the parliamentary group leader of Fidesz-MPP as head of cabinet. After 1998 forming of Fidesz government he was elected political state secretary of the Prime Minister's Office. He was engaged in business guidance after the 2002 parliamentary election. He was co-opted to the National Assembly in November 2004, after László Surján had resigned from his mandate secured through the county list, having been elected to the European Parliament. Nagy took the oath on 13 December. From 20 December 2004 to 20 February 2005 he was a recorder of the Parliament.

In the parliamentary election in 2006 he obtained an individual mandate in Szécsény constituency, Nógrád County. He became a member of the Christian Democratic People's Party (KDNP) parliamentary group. From 30 May 2006 he was a Vice Chairman of the Committee on Environmental Protection. After the Hungarian parliamentary election in 2010, he became a member of the Committee on Foreign Affairs on 28 February 2011. He also served as Vice Chairman of the Committee on Sustainable Development. He was appointed Hungarian Ambassador to Israel, as a result he resigned from his mandate on 22 August 2013. His parliamentary seat remained vacant.

In 2018, Nagy was appointed Hungarian Ambassador to Austria.
