= Muhi =

- Location of Borsod-Abaúj-Zemplén county in Hungary

- Location of Muhi
- Coordinates: 47.97789°N 20.92933°E
- Country: Hungary
- County: Borsod-Abaúj-Zemplén

Area
  - Total: 9.62 km^{2} (3.71 sq mi)

Population (2004)
  - Total: 538
  - Density: 55.92/km^{2} (144.8/sq mi)
- Time zone: UTC+1 (CET)
  - Summer (DST): UTC+2 (CEST)
- Postal code: 3552
- Area code: 46

Muhi is a village in Borsod-Abaúj-Zemplén County, Hungary, located near the Sajó River.

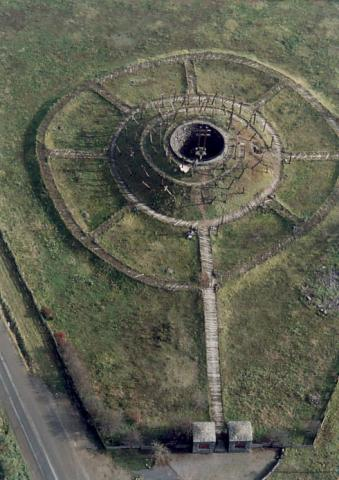
Aerial photograph: Muhi, earth fort

The area has been inhabited since prehistoric times. In the 13th century, two villages stood here. During the First Mongol invasion of Hungary, the Battle of Mohi took place here in April 1241, where the Mongols led by Batu Khan decisively defeated the forces of King Béla IV of Hungary.
