= Nagykinizs =

- Location of Borsod-Abaúj-Zemplén county in Hungary

- Location of Nagykinizs
- Coordinates: 48.23625°N 21.03678°E
- Country: Hungary
- County: Borsod-Abaúj-Zemplén

Area
  - Total: 6.57 km^{2} (2.54 sq mi)

Population (2004)
  - Total: 351
  - Density: 53.42/km^{2} (138.4/sq mi)
- Time zone: UTC+1 (CET)
  - Summer (DST): UTC+2 (CEST)
- Postal code: 3844
- Area code: 46

Nagykinizs is a village in Borsod-Abaúj-Zemplén county, Hungary.
