= Girincs =

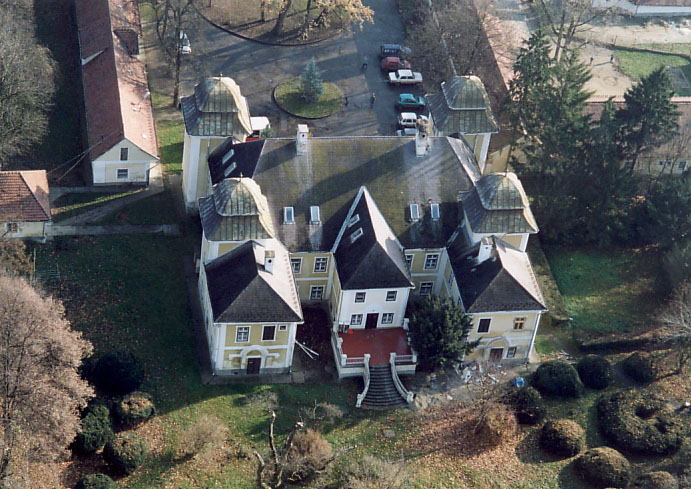
- Aerial photograph of Dőry palace in Girincs

- Seal

- Location of Borsod-Abaúj-Zemplén county in Hungary

- Location of Girincs
- Coordinates: 47.96934°N 20.98474°E
- Country: Hungary
- County: Borsod-Abaúj-Zemplén

Area
  - Total: 11.14 km^{2} (4.30 sq mi)

Population (2004)
  - Total: 836
  - Density: 75.04/km^{2} (194.4/sq mi)
- Time zone: UTC+1 (CET)
  - Summer (DST): UTC+2 (CEST)
- Postal code: 3578
- Area code: 49

Girincs is a village in Borsod-Abaúj-Zemplén county, Hungary.
