= Bekecs =

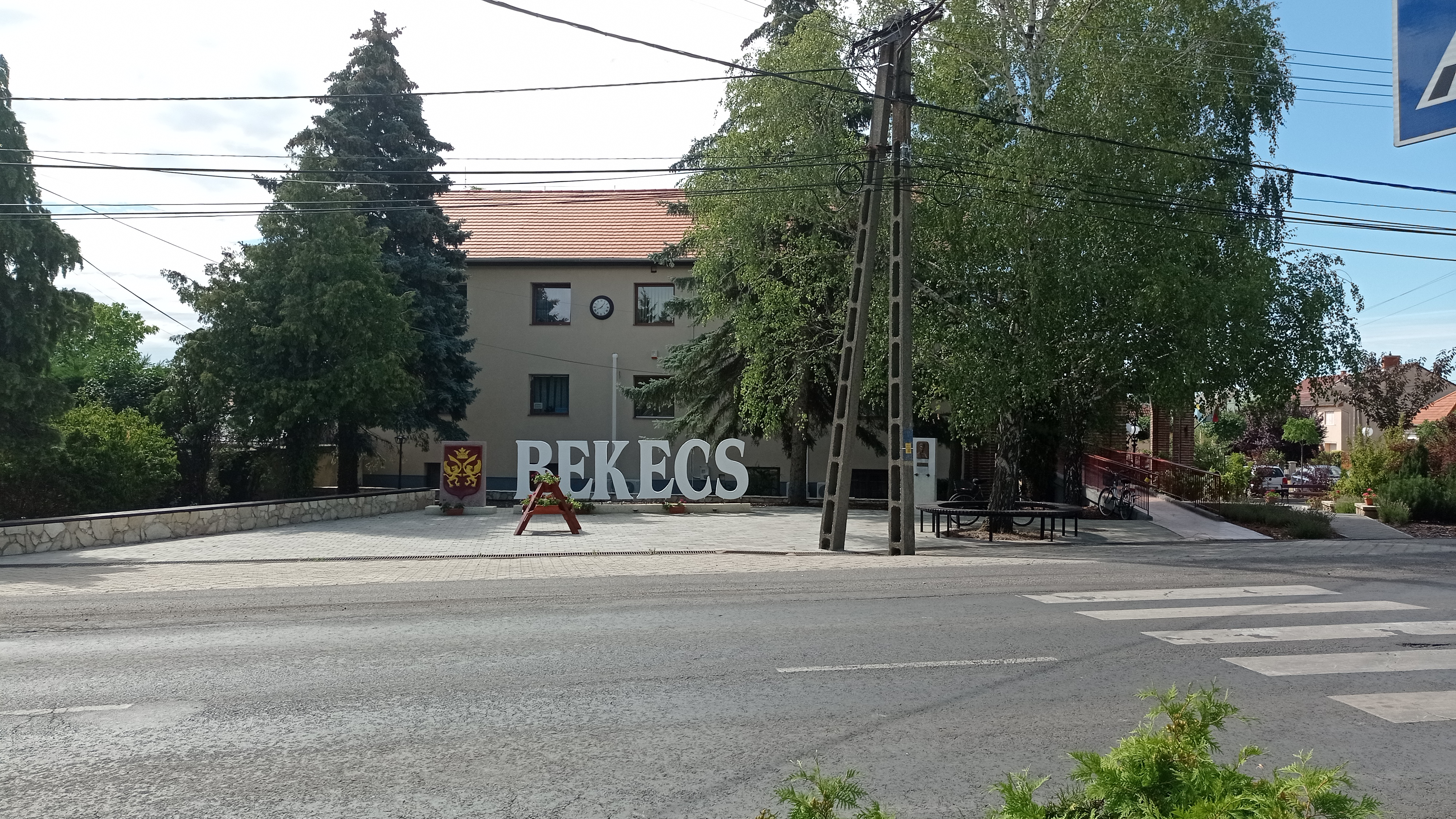
- Town hall

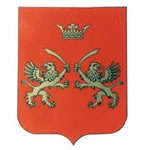
- Seal

- Location of Borsod-Abaúj-Zemplén county in Hungary
- Country: Hungary
- County: Borsod-Abaúj-Zemplén

Area
  - Total: 25.72 km^{2} (9.93 sq mi)

Population (2004)
  - Total: 2,538
  - Density: 98.67/km^{2} (255.6/sq mi)
- Time zone: UTC+1 (CET)
  - Summer (DST): UTC+2 (CEST)
- Postal code: 3903
- Area code: 47

Bekecs is a village in Borsod-Abaúj-Zemplén County, Hungary.

In the 19th and 20th centuries, a small Jewish community lived in the village, in 1880 109 Jews lived in the village, most of whom were murdered in the Holocaust. The community had a Jewish cemetery.
