= Megyaszó =

Coordinates: 48°11′N 21°03′E

- Village
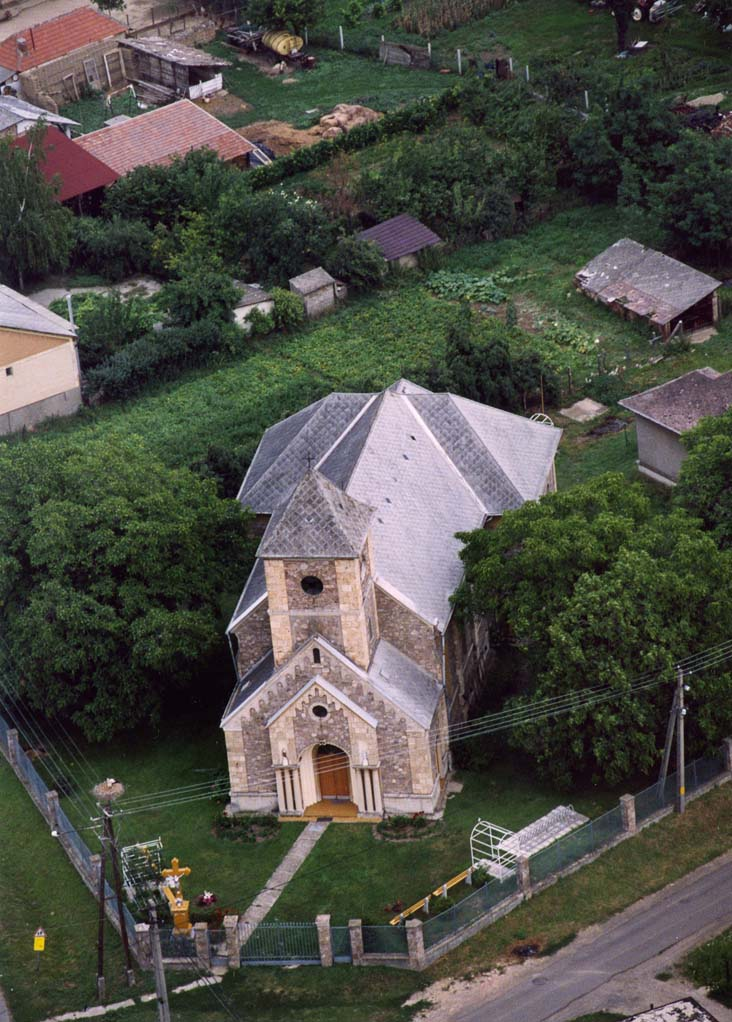
- Megyaszo 03civertanlegi
- Interactive map of Megyaszó
- Country: Hungary
- Regions: Northern Hungary
- County: Borsod-Abaúj-Zemplén County
- Time zone: UTC+1 (CET)
  - Summer (DST): UTC+2 (CEST)

Megyaszó is a village in Borsod-Abaúj-Zemplén County in northeastern Hungary.
