= Zsófia Koncz =

Hungarian politician

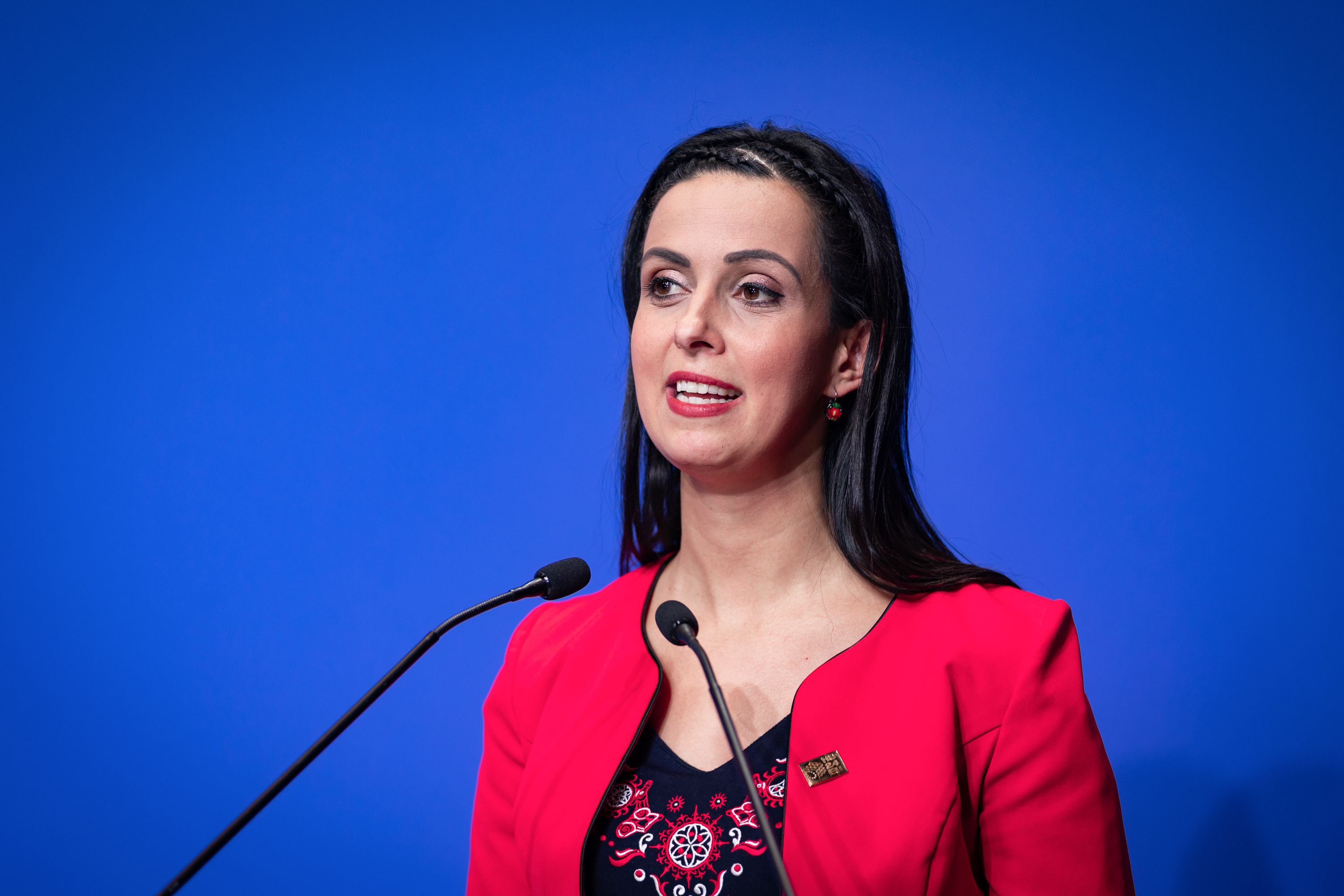
- Zsófia Koncz in 2024

Member of the Hungarian Parliament
- Incumbent
- Assumed office 2 November 2020

Personal details
- Born: 1990 (age 35–36) Szerencs, Hungary
- Party: Fidesz
- Parent: Ferenc Koncz
- Education: Eötvös Loránd University

Zsófia Koncz (born 1990) is a Hungarian politician.

== Personal life ==
Her father Ferenc Koncz died in 2020, and she replaced him in the National Assembly at the 2020 Tiszaújváros by-election.

== See also ==
- List of members of the National Assembly of Hungary (2018–2022)
- List of members of the National Assembly of Hungary (2022–2026)
- List of members of the National Assembly of Hungary (2026–2030)
