= Ferenc Koncz =

Hungarian politician (1959–2020)

Member of the National Assembly
- In office 8 May 2018 – 10 July 2020
- In office 14 May 2010 – 5 May 2014
- In office 27 August 2004 – 15 May 2006
- In office 18 June 1998 – 14 May 2002

Personal details
- Born: 2 October 1959 Tornaszentjakab, Hungary
- Died: 10 July 2020 (aged 60) Bekecs, Hungary
- Party: Fidesz (1990–2020)
- Spouse: Tünde Konczné Kondás
- Children: 3 (including Zsófia Koncz)
- Profession: teacher, politician

Ferenc Koncz (2 October 1959 – 10 July 2020) was a Hungarian teacher and politician, member of the National Assembly (MP) for Szerencs (Borsod-Abaúj-Zemplén County Constituency XI) from 2010 to 2014, and for Tiszaújváros (Borsod-Abaúj-Zemplén County Constituency VI) from 2018 until his death. He was also a Member of Parliament from the Fidesz Borsod-Abaúj-Zemplén County between 1998 and 2002, and from the party's National List from 2004 to 2006. He served as Mayor of Szerencs from 2010 to 2018.

== Profession ==
He was born in Tornaszentjakab on 2 October 1959. He finished his secondary studies at the Secondary Technical School of Machine Industry in Miskolc in 1978, where he acquired machine production technologist qualifications. He started working for the State Building Company of Borsod.

In 1980, he went to work as an untrained teacher in the Ragály Primary School. After completing his compulsory military service he studied mathematics and physics between 1983 and 1987, initially at Bessenyei György Teacher Training College in Nyíregyháza for two years, then at the Teacher Training College Faculty of Eötvös Loránd University of Budapest for another two years. He taught in Budapest for a year, then moved to teach in Rákóczi Zsigmond Elementary School in Szerencs.

== Political career ==
He became involved in politics when he was in college. In 1990, he joined Fidesz. He headed the party's Szerencs branch from 1993 to 1998, then served on the National Board from 1995 to 1998. He became vice president of the county organisation in 1998. Since autumn of 2003, the beginning of Fidesz' transformation into a people's party, he has been president of the Szerencs constituency.

In the local elections in October 1990 and December 1994 he was elected member of the body of representatives of Szerencs from the party list. He headed the party list in the 1998 local elections. For three terms he has been serving on the Education and Sport Committees. In the 1994–98 term he was deputy chairman, then from 1998 to 2002, chairman of the Education Committee. He was a deputy mayor in 2001–02. Since October 2002 he was re-elected as local representative. He chaired the Committee on Public Education and Culture and was a municipal councillor. Koncz was a member of the General Assembly of Borsod-Abaúj-Zemplén from 2002 to 2010, serving its vice-president between 2006 and 2010.

Koncz ran in the parliamentary elections for the first time in the spring of 1994. In 1998, he secured a seat in the Parliament from the party's County Regional List. He was active in the Youth and Sport Committee and the Committee on Environmental Protection. A joint candidate of Fidesz and the Hungarian Democratic Forum (MDF) in 2002, he lost to György Szabó (MSZP) by two votes in a memorably tight competition as a result of a court decision, and did not make it to Parliament even from the list.

He was co-opted on 24 August 2004 to take the seat of András Gyürk, who resigned, having been elected to the European Parliament. He took his oath three days later. He was a member of the Environment Committee. He became MP for Szerencs in the 2010 Hungarian parliamentary election. He was a member of the Committee on Sustainable Development and Chairman of the Subcommittee on Energy from 2010 to 2014. He was elected mayor of Szerencs in the 2010 local elections.

Koncz did not run in the 2014 parliamentary election due to the newly adopted conflict of interest law. He was re-elected as mayor of Szerencs in the 2014 local elections. The Fidesz nominated Koncz as MP candidate for Tiszaújváros in the 2018 parliamentary election, replacing Roland Mengyi, who was charged with corruption. Koncz secured the mandate in the election, as a result resigned from his mayoral seat. He functioned as a member of the Committee on Sustainable Development and President of its Subcommittee on Climate Protection from 2018 until his death.

He was succeeded as mayor of Szerencs in July 2018 by Tibor Nyiri, a fellow Fidesz member and former deputy mayor under Koncz. Their relationship had deteriorated in the following year, because Koncz "retained his influence in the town hall" and attempted to manage municipal affairs by bypassing the mayor. In June 2019, Nyiri decided to run as an independent candidate for the upcoming local election. Koncz and his party supported Zsolt Egeli, incumbent deputy mayor. During the election in October, Nyiri was re-elected, while Fidesz lost all its seats in the town council.

== Personal life ==
Koncz was married to Tünde Konczné Kondás; they had three children.

Ferencz Koncz died in a motor-vehicle collision in Bekecs, near Szerencs, on 10 July 2020. He was succeeded as MP for Tiszaújváros by his daughter and fellow Fidesz member Zsófia Koncz, who was elected during a by-election in October 2020.
