= Szerencs Subregion =

Coordinates: 48°09′N 21°10′E

Szerencs Subregion Borsod-Abaúj-Zemplén fourth largest of the subregions of Hungary. Area : 498,95 km². Population : 44 337 (2009)

Settlements:

- Alsódobsza
- Bekecs
- Golop
- Legyesbénye
- Mád
- Megyaszó
- Mezőzombor
- Monok
- Prügy
- Rátka
- Sóstófalva
- Szerencs
- Taktaharkány
- Taktakenéz
- Taktaszada
- Tállya
- Tiszalúc
- Újcsanálos

== See also ==
- Szerencs District (from 2013)
