= Szerencs District =

Coordinates: 48.1500°N 21.1667°E

Szerencs District Szerencsi járás
- Districts of Hungary
- Coat of arms

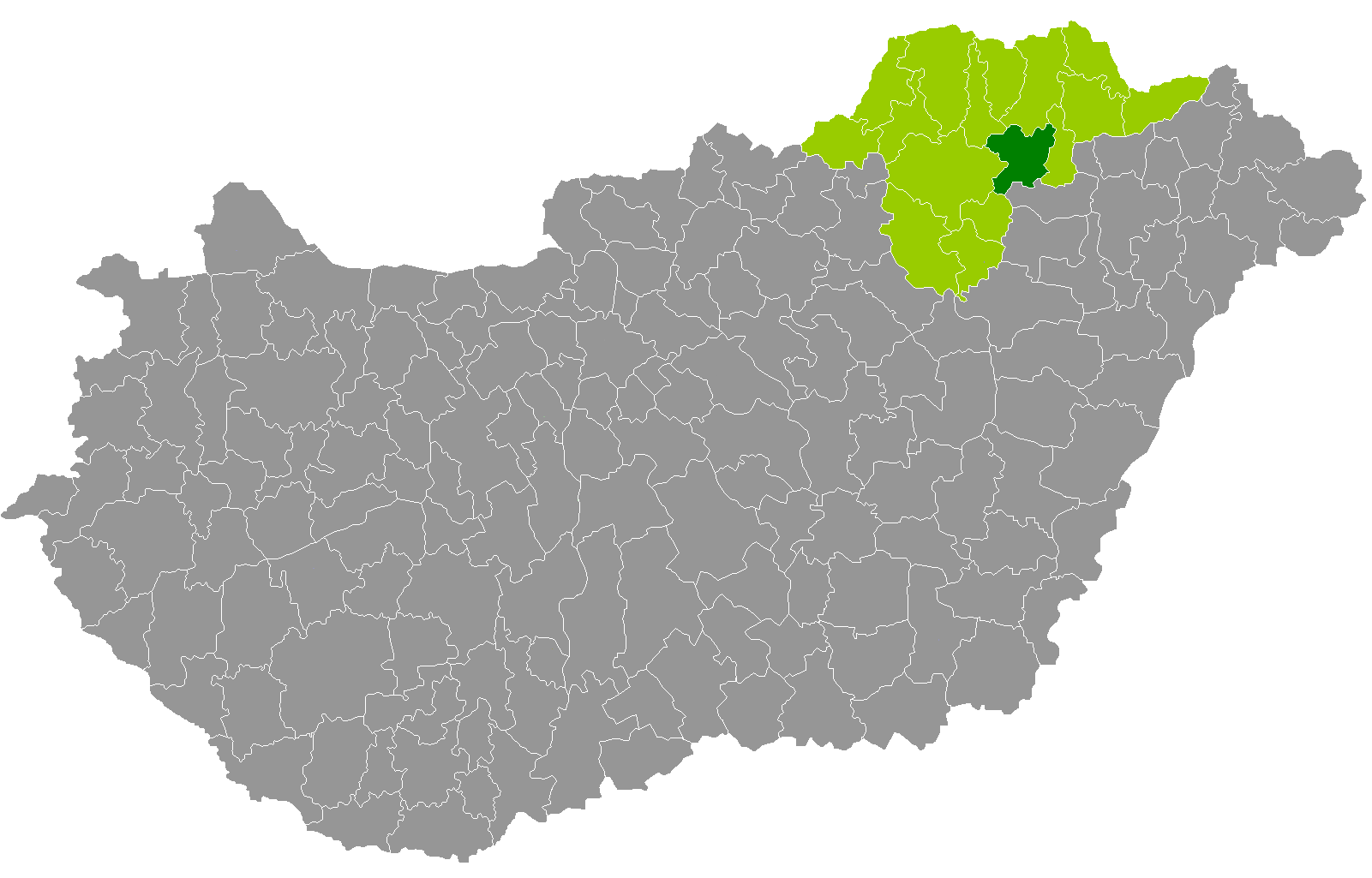
- Szerencs District within Hungary and Borsod-Abaúj-Zemplén County.
- Country: Hungary
- County: Borsod-Abaúj-Zemplén
- District seat: Szerencs

Area
  - Total: 432.07 km^{2} (166.82 sq mi)
  - Rank: 6th in Borsod-Abaúj-Zemplén

Population (2011 census)
  - Total: 38,106
  - Rank: 5th in Borsod-Abaúj-Zemplén
  - Density: 88/km^{2} (230/sq mi)

Szerencs (Hungarian: Szerencsi járás) is a district in central-eastern part of Borsod-Abaúj-Zemplén County. Szerencs is also the name of the town where the district seat is found. The district is located in the Northern Hungary Statistical Region.

== Geography ==
Szerencs District borders with Szikszó District and Gönc District to the north, Tokaj District to the east, Tiszavasvári District (Szabolcs-Szatmár-Bereg County) and Tiszaújváros District to the south, Miskolc District to the west. The number of the inhabited places in Szerencs District is 16.

== Municipalities ==
The district has 1 town, 2 large villages and 13 villages. (ordered by population, as of 1 January 2012)

- Alsódobsza (319)
- Bekecs (2,391)
- Golop (523)
- Legyesbénye (1,516)
- Mád (2,128)
- Megyaszó (2,722)
- Mezőzombor (2,378)
- Monok (1,558)
- Prügy (2,348)
- Rátka (946)
- **Szerencs** (9,100) – district seat
- Taktaharkány (3,642)
- Taktakenéz (1,243)
- Taktaszada (1,878)
- Tállya (1,905)
- Tiszalúc (5,304)

The bolded municipality is city, italics municipalities are large villages.

== Demographics ==
Religion in Szerencs District (2011 census)
1. Catholic Church (43.9%)
2. Greek Catholicism (3.70%)
3. Calvinism (24.7%)
4. Lutheranism (0.10%)
5. Other religions (1.10%)
6. Non-religious (5.50%)
7. Atheists (0.30%)
8. Undeclared (20.7%)

In 2011, it had a population of 38,106 and the population density was 88/km^{2}.

Year	County population	Change
2011	38,106	n/a

=== Ethnicity ===
Besides the Hungarian majority, the main minorities are the Roma (approx. 4,000) and German (850).

Total population (2011 census): 38,106
Ethnic groups (2011 census): Identified themselves: 38,709 persons:

- Hungarians: 33,893 (87.56%)
- Gypsies: 3,777 (9.76%)
- Germans: 827 (2.14%)
- Others and indefinable: 212 (0.55%)

Approx. 500 persons in Szerencs District did declare more than one ethnic group at the 2011 census.

=== Religion ===
Religious adherence in the county according to 2011 census:

- Catholic – 18,124 (Roman Catholic – 16,714; Greek Catholic – 1,410);
- Reformed – 9,433;
- Evangelical – 51;
- other religions – 403;
- Non-religious – 2,083;
- Atheism – 121;
- Undeclared – 7,891.

== Gallery ==
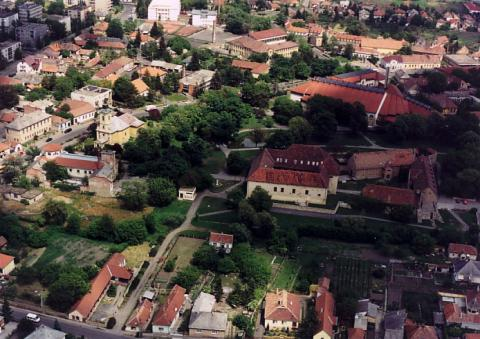
Szerencs, the district seat

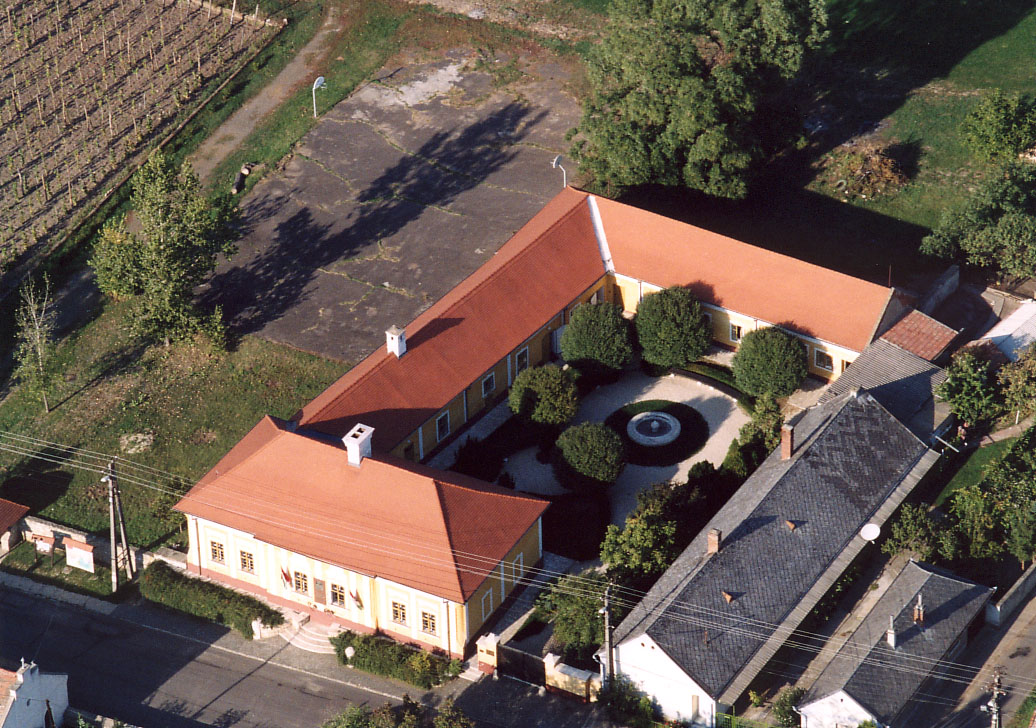
Lajos Kossuth birthplace in Monok

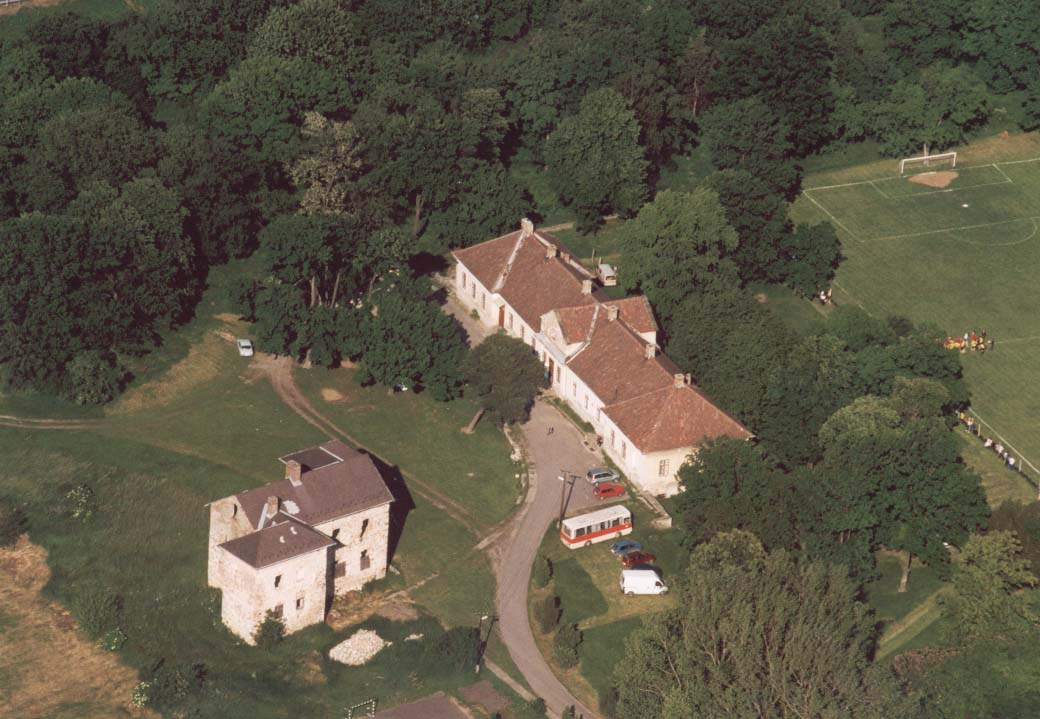
Vay Mansion in Golop

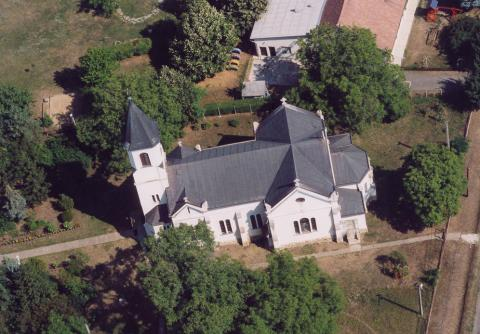
St. Stephen of Hungary Church in Tiszalúc

== See also ==
- List of cities and towns of Hungary
- Szerencs Subregion (until 2013)
