= Main road 37 (Hungary) =

Road in Hungary

Main road 37
- 37-es főút
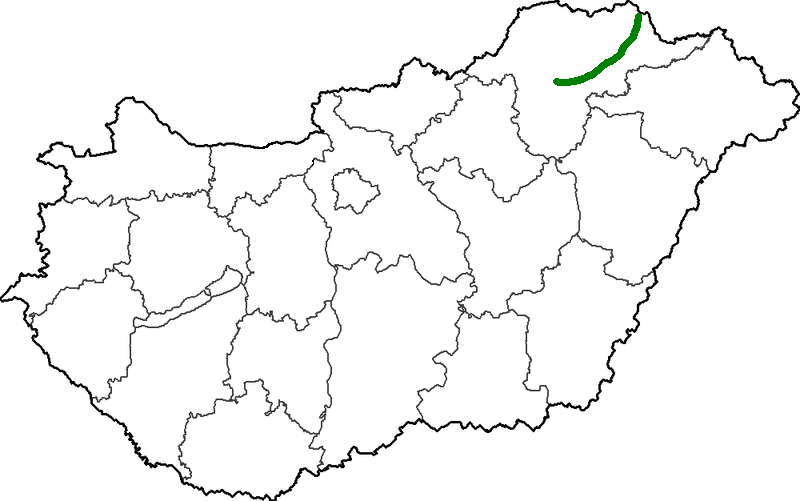

Route information
- Length: 76 km (47 mi)

Major junctions
- From: 3 near Miskolc
- 39, 38 near Mezőzombor; 381 in Sátoraljaújhely
- To: Bánréve; I/79A border with Slovakia

Location
- Country: Hungary
- Counties: Borsod-Abaúj-Zemplén
- Major cities: Miskolc, Onga, Szerencs, Sárospatak, Sátoraljaújhely

Highway system
- Roads in Hungary; Highways; Main roads; Local roads

The Main road 37 is a west–east direction Secondary class main road in the road in the valley of a Bodrog river, that connects the Main road 3 change to the border of Slovakia. The road is 76 kilometres (47 mi) long.

The road, as well as all other main roads in Hungary, is managed and maintained by Magyar Közút, state owned company.

== Road junctions and populated areas ==
Main road 37 junctions/populated areas/toll plazas
Type	Slip roads/Notes
	Main road 3 to Encs or Miskolc, Budapest; Side road 2617 to Arnót towards to Edelény; Side road 37104 to Felsőzsolca; The western terminus of the double carriage road and the route. From the Main road 3 rounabout to Szerencs the route is double carriage roads.
	Felsőzsolca - Side road 3605 to Onga
	Miskolc–Hidasnémeti railway line
	Side road 37106 to Alsózsolca or Onga.
	Side road 37103 to Hernádkak-Belegrád.
	Hernád
	Hernádkak, Gestely; Side road 3607 to Kesznyéten
	Újharangod; Side road 3723 to Taktaharkány
	Side road 3605 to Újharangod and Gesztely. (junction from Szerencs only)
	Side road 3611 to Szerencs or Taktaharkány and Tiszalúc
	Szerencs; Szerencs, Béke u. Szerencs, Csalógány u. The eastern terminus of double carriage road. Szerencs, Bajcsy-Zsilinszky u. / Side road 3622 to Prügy. Side road 3614 to Szerencs or Mezőzombor.
	Szerencs–Hidasnémeti railway line
	Main road 39 to Abaújszántó towards to Encs. / Side road 3614 to Mezőzombor

== See also ==
- Roads in Hungary
