= 1878 flood in Miskolc =

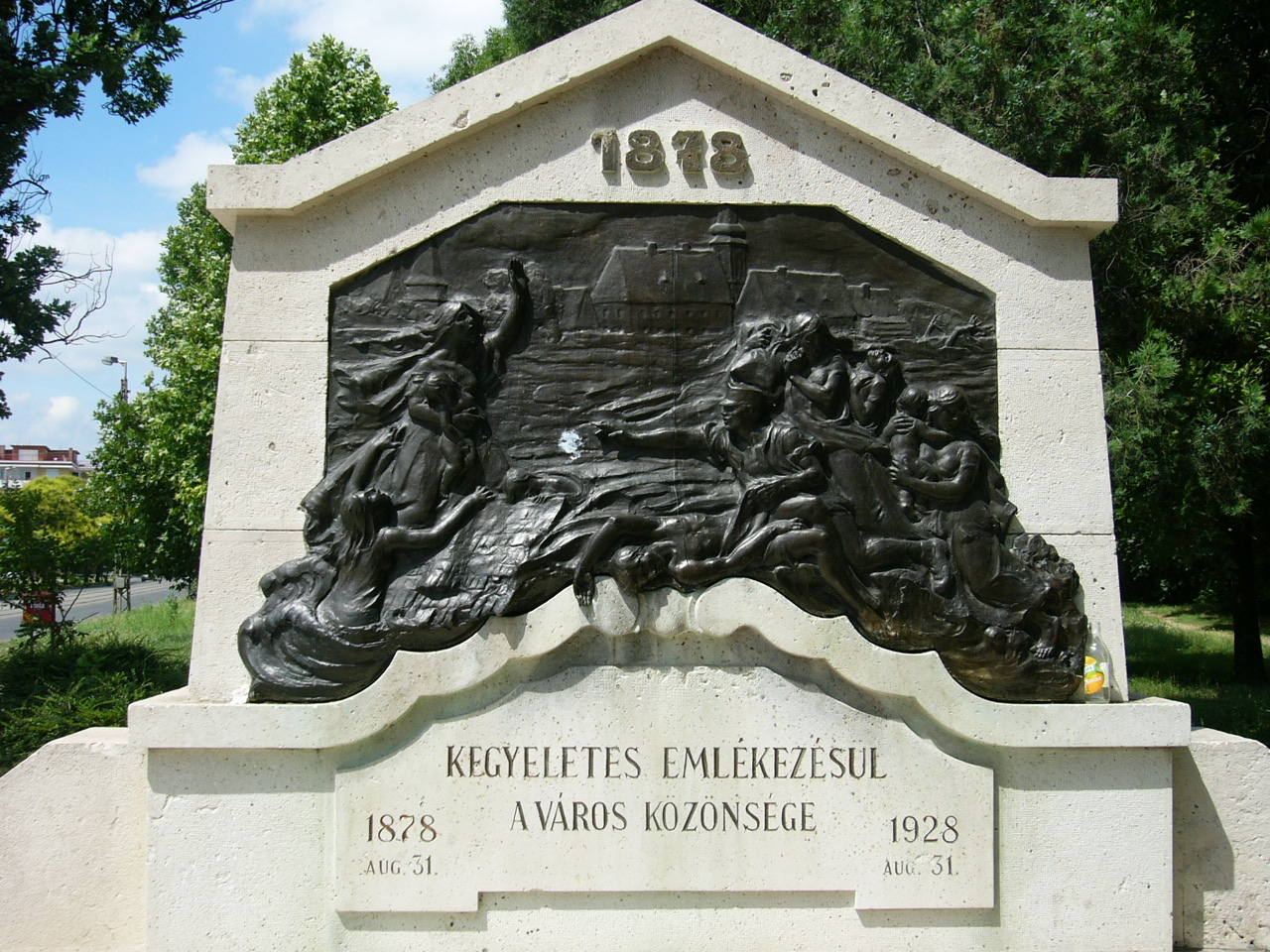
Memorial of the flood on St. Anna Square

The Hungarian city of Miskolc lies on the drainage area of the river Sajó and the stream Szinva. Both the river and the stream played an important part in the development of the city, but during great rains they also meant danger. There were floods in 1691, 1788, 1813, 1845 and 1853, but the largest, which had the most victims and is still remembered as the "Great Flood", was the one which destroyed the city in 1878. Of all the floods in 19th century Hungary, this one killed the most people.

On August 30, 1878, large storms coming from the Transdanubian region arrived in Northern Hungary – first in Eger, next in Óhuta, Diósgyőr and Miskolc, and then in Tállya, Golop and Mád. The rainfall swelled the streams Szinva and Pece, and destroyed the largest part of Downtown Miskolc. The water swept away bridges, mills and houses, carrying a large amount of debris. The water level rose by half a meter per minute, making it impossible for many people to escape. In some parts of the city the water was 4–5 meters deep.

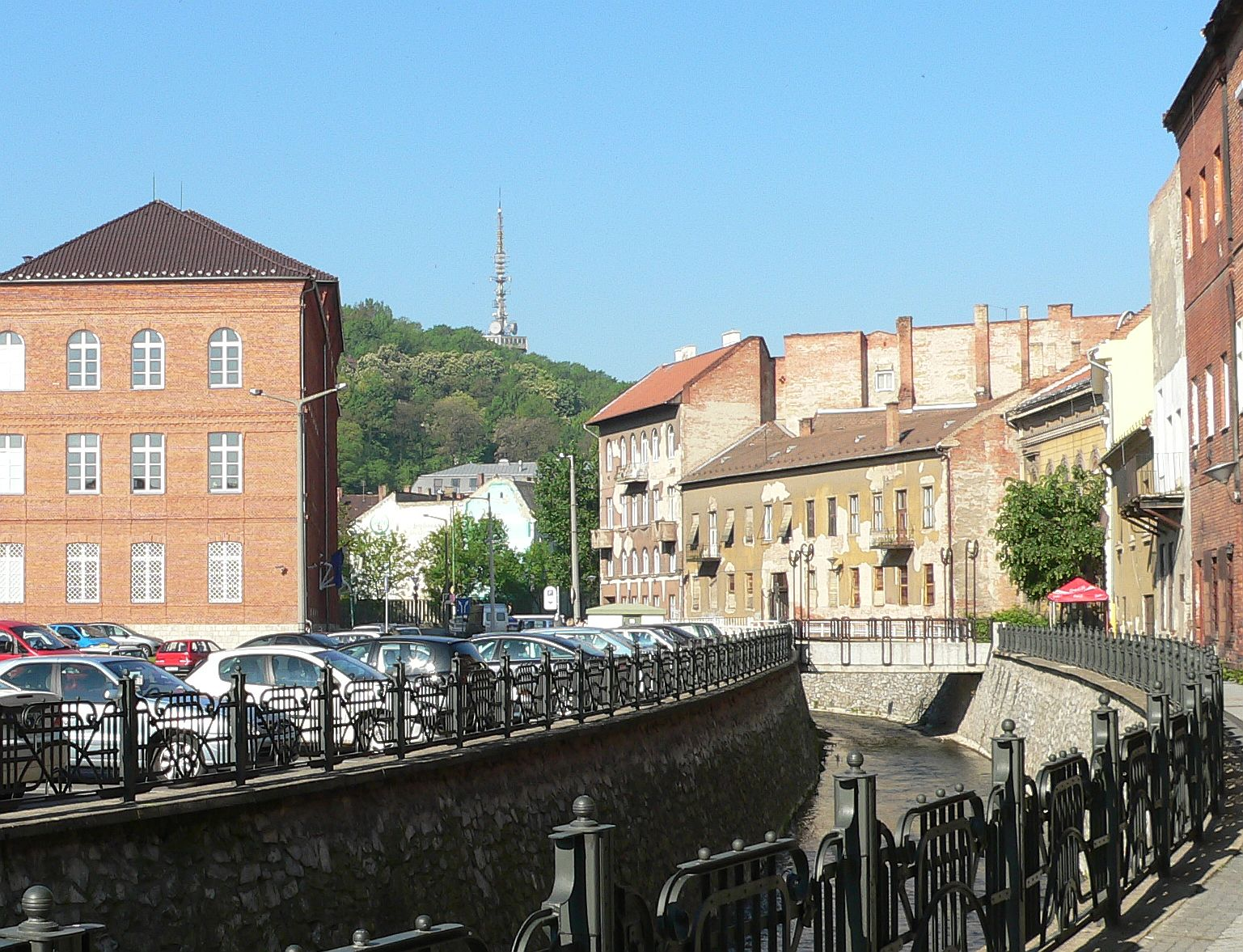
The Szinva today. Most of its water is now led into the water supply system of the city

The flood destroyed 2000 buildings and killed almost 300 people (or 400 if people in neighbouring areas are also included in the count). In the small village of Óhuta, 73 houses were destroyed.

After the flood the citizens of Miskolc had to rebuild the city with almost no help. In previous and following years, the cities of Pest (1838) and Szeged (1879) were rebuilt in countrywide collaboration, with the help of generous donations. However, in the case of Miskolc, the fact that other, then more important, cities were threatened by flood diverted the nation's attention, even though the flood in Miskolc killed more victims than the floods in Szeged and Pest combined.
