= Monok =

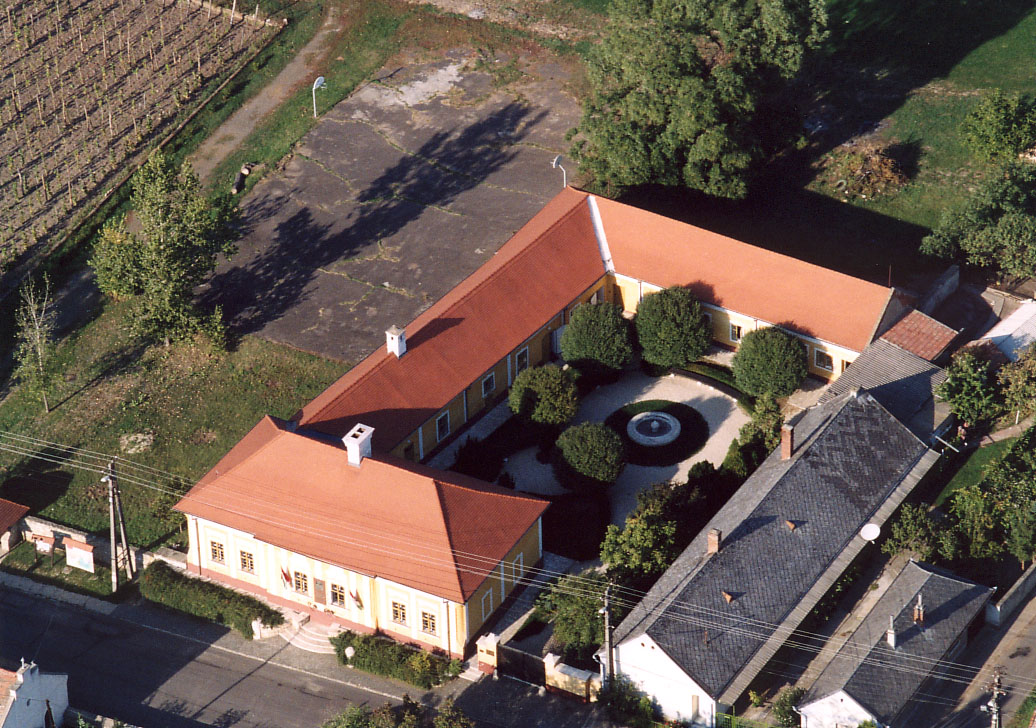
- Lajos Kossuth's birthplace

- Flag Coat of arms

- Location of Monok in Hungary
- Coordinates: 48.2102°N 21.1477°E
- Country: Hungary
- Region: Northern Hungary
- County: Borsod-Abaúj-Zemplén
- Subregion: Szerencs
- Rank: Village

Government
  - Mayor: Demeterné Bártfay Emese

Area
  - Total: 41.98 km^{2} (16.21 sq mi)

Population (2009)
  - Total: 1,606
  - Density: 38.26/km^{2} (99.08/sq mi)
- Time zone: UTC+1 (CET)
  - Summer (DST): UTC+2 (CEST)
- Postal code: 3905
- Area code: +36 47
- KSH code: 07825
- Website: www.monok.hu

Monok is a village in Borsod-Abaúj-Zemplén, Hungary and is part of the Tokaj wine region.

== Geography ==
The nearest town is Szerencs 12 km (7 mi) away. Neighbouring villages are Golop 5 km (3 mi) away, Legyesbénye 7 km (4 mi) away and Tállya 7 km (4 mi) away.

The Zemplén Mountains have two sides: on the north Vilvitány Hill, on the south Szerencs Hill. The village lies in the valley between the two.

Although the north is mountainous the south is lower lying at around 300 metres (1,000 ft). On the north and south slopes there are fields and vineyards whose wines compete with those from Tokaj, and the fields bordering the vineyards offer views of the Tatra Mountains.

== History ==
It is not certain when the village was established, but it was some time during the Mongol invasion of Europe, or the earlier Hungarian invasion (Hungarian: honfoglalás).

The first record of the village is in 1392 and the Monok family owned it from the mid-13th century until the mid-17th century. The name of the village allegedly comes from Slavic monoh meaning "monk". During the Ottoman Empire, the village was razed and in 1567 it was recorded as being just barren fields. Towards the end of this century the village was reinhabited and around 1570 a small castle was built in the Renaissance style. Later, the village was owned by the Andrássy family who renovated the castle, but since it was too small they built another one nearby in the Classical style.

== Ethnicity ==
93% of the population is Hungarian, with the remaining 7% being of Romani origin.

== Traditions ==
- Monok holds a summer fair on the second Sunday of every September called Kálvária fair, to which people from far and wide make a pilgrimage.
- Each August the renovated Monaky Castle holds a "Renaissance Castle Day", when people wear period dress and perform archery and stage marionette shows. There is also a market and a beer tent, which also serves cauldrons of goulash and soft drinks.

== Landmarks ==
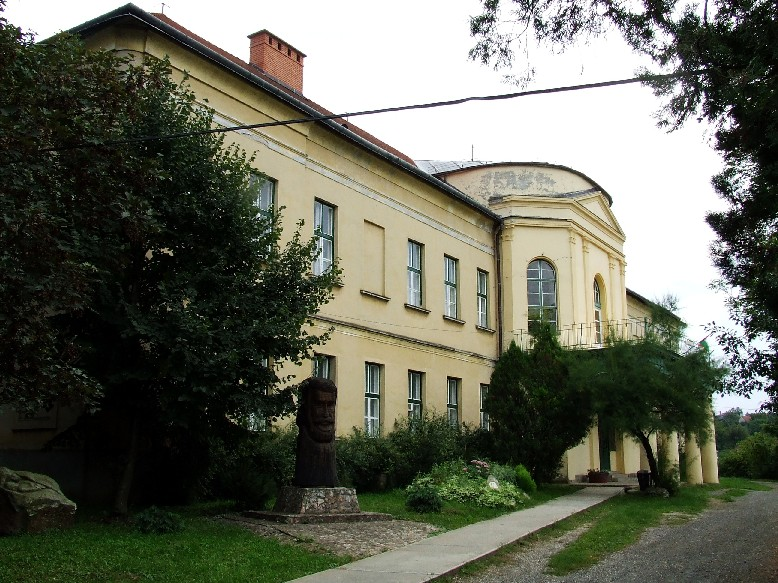
Andrássy Castle

- Lajos Kossuth's birthplace
- Andrássy Castle
- Renaissance Castle (small)
- War memorials
- Kálvária fairground
- Roman Catholic church, renovated in 2005
- Lake Ingvár
- Many old houses with verandas in several architectural styles
- Szécheny family mausoleum.

== Notable people ==
- Lajos Kossuth, leader of Hungary, was born in Monok on 19 September 1802
- Miklós Németh, Hungarian Prime Minister, was born in Monok on 24 January 1948
- János Holup, sport shooter
