= Ilyés =

Ilyés is a Hungarian surname. Notable people with the surname include:

- Annamária Ilyés
- Ferenc Ilyés (born 1981), Hungarian handball player
- Iuliu Ilyés (born 1957), Romanian engineer and politician
- Ildikó Ilyés (born 1966), Hungarian racewalker
- Róbert Ilyés

== See also ==
- Gyula Illyés
- Illés (disambiguation)
