= Isépy =

Noble family

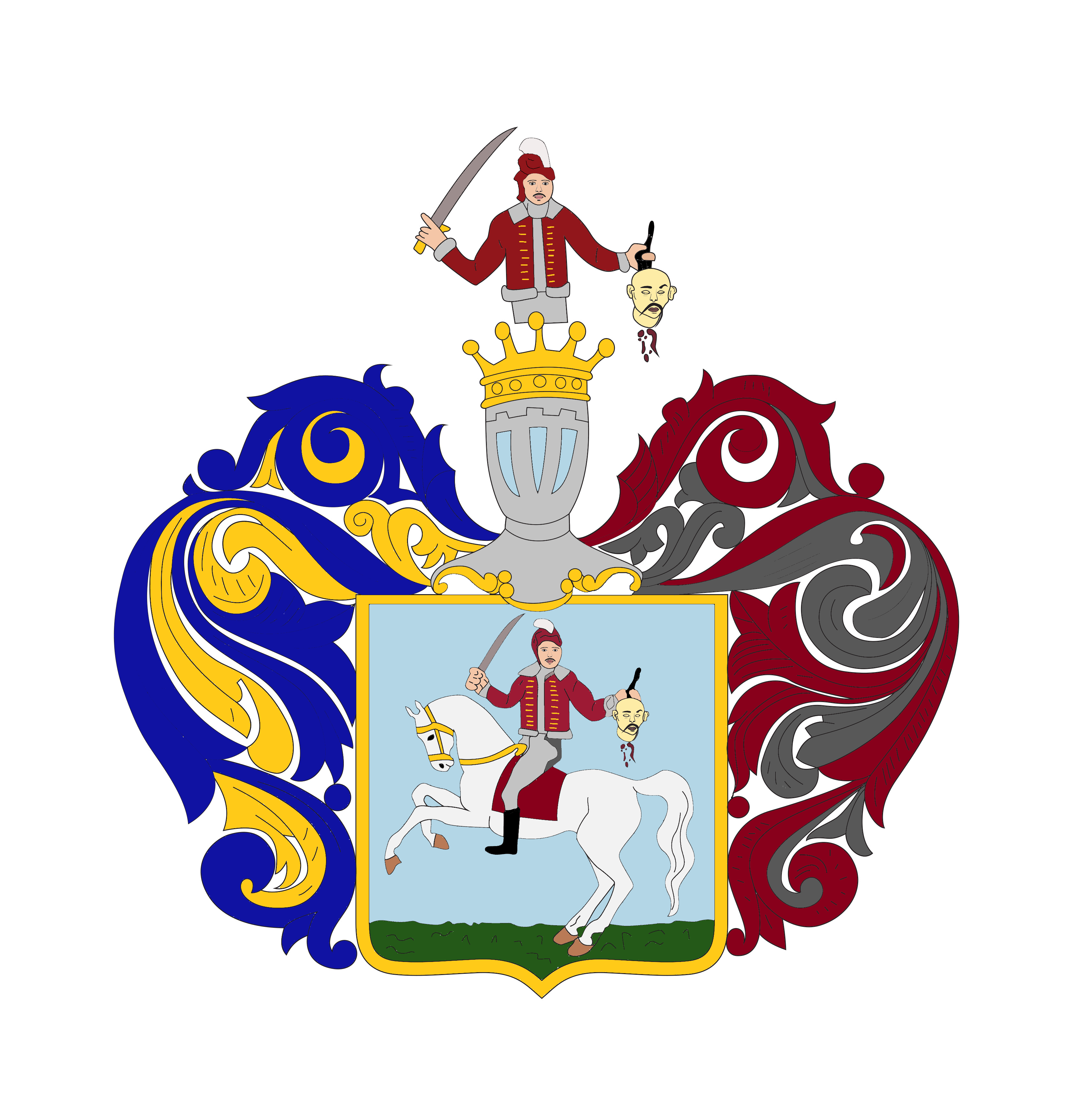
Coat of Arms of the Isépy family

The Isépy family of Magyarizsép (in Latin gens de [Magyar-]Isép; in German von Isép) is one of the oldest surviving noble families in Hungary. Their ancestral seat was the village of Magyarizsép (since the Treaty of Trianon, Czehoslovakia and from 1993 Slovakia; Slovak: Nižný Žipov).

== Name ==
The name appears in different forms: Izsépy, Isipi, Isepi. The official version ‘Isépy’ is the archaic form of the phonetically correct ‘Izsépy’. Etymologically, the name is traced back to the Greek Εὐσέβειος or the Latin form Eusebius, which entered Hungarian as Özséb, or to the name Josef (József).

== History ==
The Isépy of Magyarizsép descend from the Bogát-Radvány genus, which split into six families in the mid-13th century, along with the Cseleji, Monoky and Rákóczi. Except for the one branch of the Isépy, to which the members of the family living today can be traced back, all the others died out sooner or later. The ancestor of this branch was Sztáncs of Isép (early 13th century), whose name can be found in today's Isztáncs (Slovak: Stanča).

Members of the family bear the noble and administrative title of comes (latin “count”), i.e. hungarian ispán, in documents from the 13th and 14th centuries. In the 14th and 15th centuries, the Isépy owned 42 villages in the county of Zemplén and Sáros. Within a few decades in the second half of the 15th century, the Isépy family lost most of their land.

The history of the Isépy family is well documented in the following centuries, but members of the family played hardly any role in public life until the 19th century. Until the beginning of the 20th century and partly until the Beneš decrees, the Isépy family owned land in Magyarizsép, Barancs, Humenné, Snina, Éralja, Oroszsebes, Kistoronya, Céké and Trebišov, among other places.

== Coat of arms ==
A red-clad horseman with a blue shield on a white horse, his right hand holding a drawn sword and his left a severed head.

== People ==
- Dr. Tamás Isépy (1924–2004), Hungarian politician. In 2011, the ‘Isépy Tamás Library’ was established at the Németh László Highschool in Hódmezővásárhely from his private collection of 13,099 volumes.
- Dr. István Isépy (1942–2022), Hungarian biologist, director of the Botanical Garden of Eötvös Loránd University (ELTE), Budapest (1982–2005).
