= Elijah Monoky =

Hungarian Nobleman

- Lord of Monok
- Reign: fl. 1277
- Native name: Illés Monoky
- Known for: Founding the Monok dynasty
- Residence: Monok
- Wars and battles: Second Mongol Invasion of Hungary
- Noble family: House of Monok
- Issue: Ladislaus I; Stephen I
- Heir: Ladislaus I (''László I'')
- Father: Beke of the Bogát-Radvány Clan

Illés Monoky, also referred to as Sándor, reigned over the village of Monok and founded the House of Monok. Illés is the progenitor of the entire Monok family and the extant office of Baron granted to the Monoky family, which would be inherited by the Andrássy family.

== Name ==
Despite the certainty of the emergence of the Monok dynasty being confirmed, there has been a slight discrepancy of the name of Illés, with documents listing his name as either Sándor or Illés. The names of the descendants on the charts, however, perfectly match the descendents of the individual as well as significant dates in the family, which means that both are, in fact, the same person yet identified differently. Illés is a name of Christian and Judaic origins, literally translating to Elijah, which would have been the baptismal name rather than the given name/birth name, as Hungarians would adopt Christian names upon their baptism during this time. Illés was likely born with the name Sándor, translated as Alexander, yet adopted for himself the Christian name of Elijah. This theory also follows the growing trend of increasing Christianisation and the adoption of Christian names, as opposed to the previously common names of Slavic or Hungarian pagan origins.

== Lordship over Monok ==
During the reign of Elijah Monoky, the owner of the village of Monok and holder of economic monopoly over the village of Monok, the Mongols invaded Hungary which put the territories of the Monoks close to the frontlines. The Mongol forces would win decisively at the Battle of Mohi (also referred to as the Battle of the Sajó River or the Battle of the Tisza River), near the village of Monok, whereafter, Hungarian forces were utterly annihilated and on the retreat. The Mongol forces would come to pillage and destroy much of that country before moving on to the city of Pest and Esztergom. Elijah Monoky would be alive and hold ownership over Monok during the time of the second Mongol invasion of Hungary, however, the village and family of Monok would not be struck by Mongol forces during this conflict. The estate of Monok passed to Ladislaus Monoky I, the son of Elijah Monoky, the first well-documented Monok.

== Sources ==
1. "Barangolás Monokon." Royalmagazin.hu, https://web.archive.org/web/20160815151136/http://www.royalmagazin.hu/kozelet/barangolo/567-barangolas-monokon.

2. Karácsonyi, János. (1901) "A magyar nemzetségek a XIV. század közepéig." A Pechujfalusi Pechy Csalad Honlapja, pechy-de-pechujfalu.hu, https://www.pechy-de-pechujfalu.hu/myfiles/htmls/karacsonyi/karaxw-Title.html.

3. Kezai, Simon, et al. (1999) "Gesta Hunnorum Et Hungarorum." Central European University Press.

4. King Andrew II of Hungary. (1999) "De bulla aurea Andreae II regis Hungariae." 1222. Valdonega, 1999.

5. Makkai, László (2001). "History of Transylvania Volume I. From the Beginnings to 1606 – III. Transylvania in the Medieval Hungarian Kingdom (896–1526) – 1. Transylvania'a Indigenous Population at the Time of the Hungarian Conquest." New York: Columbia University Press, (The Hungarian original by Institute of History Of The Hungarian Academy of Sciences). ISBN 0-88033-479-7

6. "Monoky Család. (Monoki. †)." Arcanum, National Archives of Hungary, https://www.arcanum.com/hu/online-kiadvanyok/Nagyivan-nagy-ivan-magyarorszag-csaladai-1/hetedik-kotet-5828/monoky-csalad-monoki-6B2C/.

7. "Monoky de Monok family."

8. "Mónoky v. Mónok." Arcanum, National Archives of Hungary, https://www.arcanum.com/hu/online-kiadvanyok/Siebmacher-siebmacher-wappenbuch-1/der-adel-von-ungarn-magyarorszag-2/csaladok-29/monoky-v-monok-5387/.

9. Pál Engel, et al. (2001). "The Realm of St Stephen: A History of Medieval Hungary, 895–1526." I.B. Tauris, London.

10. Ráth, Mór. Magyar Elektronikus Könyvtár (MEK) / Hungarian Electronic Library, Nagy Iván, https://mek.oszk.hu/09300/09379/pdf/mo_csaladai_07.pdf.

11. "Tortenelem." Monok.hu, Web.archive.org, https://web.archive.org/web/20080311215152/http://www.monok.hu/tortenelem.html.
