= Bogátradvány (gens) =

Hungarian Clan

Bogát-Radvány (gens) Genus Bogát-Radvány Bogátradvány
- Princely, Ducal, and Baronial Clan
- Country: Principality of Hungary
- Titles: Voivode of Transylvania; Ban of Slavonia; Voivode; Ispán
- Cadet branches: House of Körtvélyessy; House of Isépy; House of Monok; House of Rákóczi

Bogátradvány (Bogát-Radván, Bogát-Radvány) was the name of a gens (Latin for "clan"; nemzetség in Hungarian) in the Kingdom of Hungary. The powerful Rákóczi family ascended from this gens.

The Cseleji, Dobi, Körtvélyessy, Hosszúmezei, Lukács, Morvay, Osvald, Posai, Bekecs and Isépy families also originated from the gens Bogátradvány.

== Origins ==
László Makkai, a Hungarian historian, through his work, Transylvania in the Medieval Hungarian Kingdom (896-1526), mentions the tribes regarding Bogát (Bugat rex) as a Gyula of the Magyar tribal confederation. Supporting the writings of Simon of Kéza, that the Bogátradvány Clan, being of Bohemian origins, means that the origin is the Keszi tribe. Simon of Kéza explains the origins of the Bogátradvány Clan are during Migration Period, as the tribe of Keszi settled in the East during the Hungarian conquests in Europe. The family of Bogát has its origins somewhere in the 300s Eastern Europe within the ruling family of the tribe of Keszi, one of the seven Magyar tribes.

== Notable clan members ==
- Bogát (fl. 919-922), Gyula of the Magyar tribes, Prince
- Radvány (died after 1071), Palatine (1067-1071)
- Ipoch (died after 1222), ban of Slavonia (1204; 1222), voivode of Transylvania (1216–1217)
- Albert (died after 1239), Vice-Palatine (1236–1239)
- Elijah Monoky (f. 1277), Lord of Monok (1277?)
- John (died 1322), vice-chancellor and provost of Székesfehérvár (1307–1322)

== Sources ==
- János Karácsonyi: A magyar nemzetségek a XIV. század közepéig. Budapest: Magyar Tudományos Akadémia. 1900–1901.
- Gyula Kristó (editor): Korai Magyar Történeti Lexikon - 9-14. század (Encyclopedia of the Early Hungarian History - 9-14th centuries); Akadémiai Kiadó, 1994, Budapest; ISBN 963-05-6722-9.
- László Makkai: Transylvania in the Medieval Hungarian Kingdom (896-1526). https://mek.oszk.hu/03400/03407/html/67.html.
- László Makkai: Transylvania in the Medieval Hungarian Kingdom (896-1526). https://mek.oszk.hu/03400/03407/html/66.html.
- Timothy Reuter, The New Cambridge Medieval History: c. 900-c. 1024, Cambridge University Press, 1995, p. 543–545, ISBN 978-0-521-36447-8
