= Nižný Žipov =

Village and municipality in Slovakia

Nižný Žipov Magyarizsép
- Municipality
- Flag

- Location of Nižný Žipov in the Košice Region Location of Nižný Žipov in Slovakia
- Coordinates: 48.58°N 21.65°E
- Country: Slovakia
- Region: Košice Region
- District: Trebišov District
- First mentioned: 1221

Area
  - Total: 17.07 km^{2} (6.59 sq mi)
- Elevation: 126 m (413 ft)

Population (2025)
  - Total: 1,502
- Time zone: UTC+1 (CET)
  - Summer (DST): UTC+2 (CEST)
- Postal code: 761 7
- Area code: +421 56
- Vehicle registration plate (until 2022): TV
- Website: www.niznyzipov.sk

Nižný Žipov (Hungarian: Magyarizsép) is a village and municipality in the Trebišov District in the Košice Region of south-eastern Slovakia.

== History ==
In historical records the village was first mentioned in 1221. It was part of the Kingdom of Hungary and the family seat of the Isép (Isépy) family. Since the Treaty of Trianon, it has belonged to Czechoslovakia, and since 1993 to Slovakia.

== Geography ==
The municipality lies at an altitude of 126 metres (413 ft) and covers an area of 17.07 km^{2} (6.59 sq mi) (2025).

== Population ==
Population statistic (10 years)
Year	1995	2005	2015	2025
Count	1204	1353	1501	1502
Difference		+12.37%	+10.93%	+0.06%

Population statistic
Year	2024	2025
Count	1496	1502
Difference		+0.40%

It has a population of 1502 people (31 December 2025).

=== Ethnicity ===
Census 2021 (1+ %)
Ethnicity	Number	Fraction
Slovak	1342	92.87%
Not found out	76	5.25%
Romani	68	4.7%
Total	1445	

In year 2021 was 1445 people by ethnicity 1342 as Slovak, 76 as Not found out, 68 as Romani, 11 as Czech, 5 as Russian, 5 as Hungarian, 2 as Other and 1 as Rusyn.

Note on population: The difference values of population numbers in the table "Population statistic" and in the sections "Ethnicity" & "Religion" is caused by the use of various statistical methods.

=== Religion ===
Census 2021 (1+ %)
Religion	Number	Fraction
Roman Catholic Church	950	65.74%
Greek Catholic Church	232	16.06%
None	98	6.78%
Not found out	82	5.67%
Calvinist Church	58	4.01%
Jehovah's Witnesses	19	1.31%
Total	1445	

In year 2021 was 1445 people by religion 950 from Roman Catholic Church, 232 from Greek Catholic Church, 98 from None, 82 from Not found out, 58 from Calvinist Church, 19 from Jehovah's Witnesses, 3 from Eastern Orthodox Church, 2 from Other and not ascertained christian church and 1 from Evangelical Church.

== Facilities ==
The village has a public library and a football pitch.
