= Subregions of Hungary =

Administrative territory

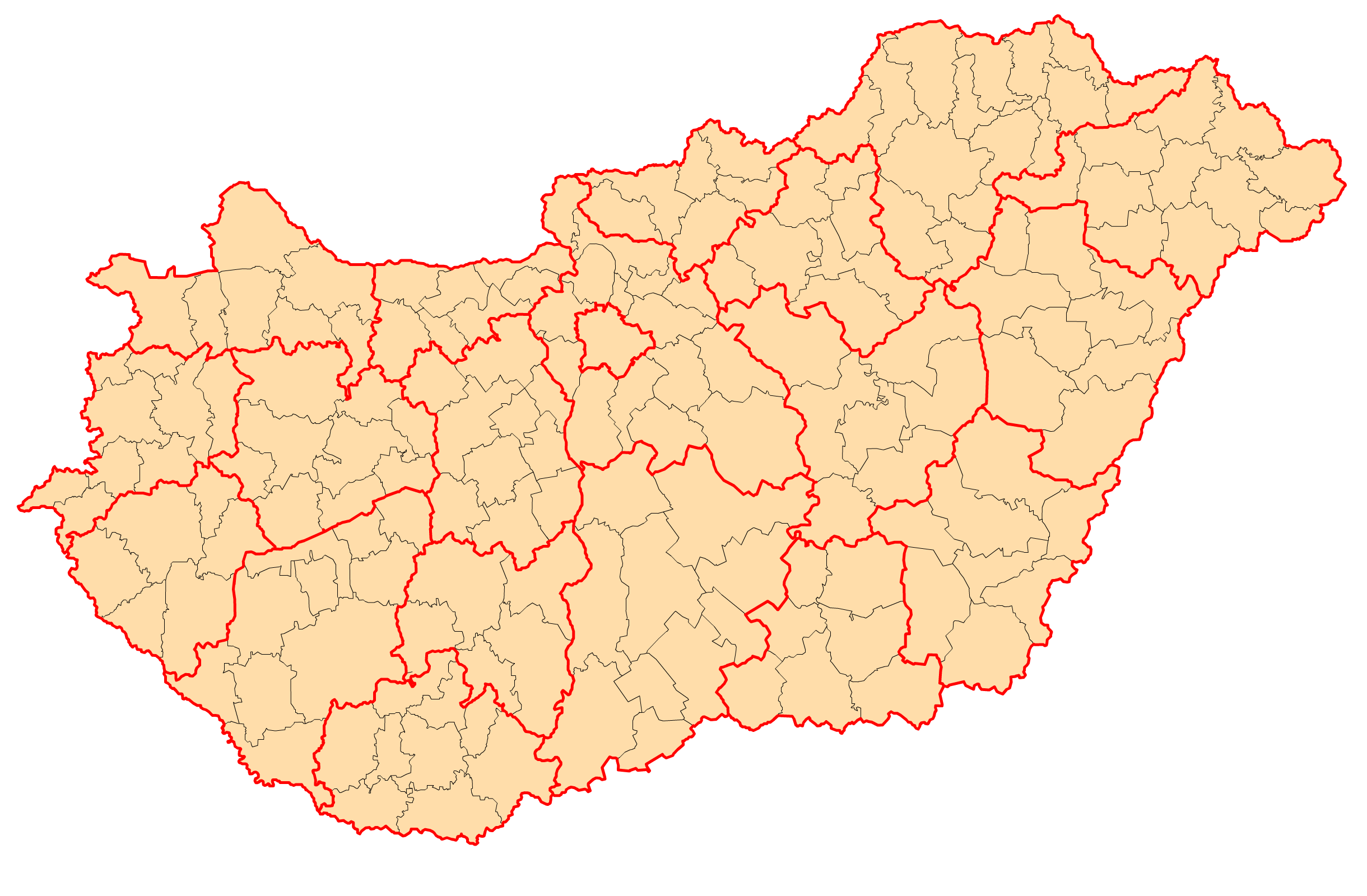

Subregions of Hungary (in Hungarian, kistérségek, sing. kistérség) were subdivisions of Hungary, dividing the twenty counties of Hungary (including Budapest) into 175 administrative subregions. The subregions were abolished and replaced by 198 districts in 2013.

== List ==
The subregions are listed below, by county:

County name	Code	Name	Seat	Settlements	Within City	Population	Area (km²)	Population density
Budapest	3101	Budapest	Budapest	1	1	1740041	525.09	3314
Bács-Kiskun County	3302	Bácsalmás Subregion	Bácsalmás	8	1	16148	381.09	42
Bács-Kiskun County	3301	Baja Subregion	Baja	20	1	72358	1190.18	61
Bács-Kiskun County	3310	Jánoshalma Subregion	Jánoshalma	4	2	15736	399.10	39
Bács-Kiskun County	3303	Kalocsa Subregion	Kalocsa	20	3	50315	1029.29	49
Bács-Kiskun County	3304	Kecskemét Subregion	Kecskemét	18	4	174545	1483.06	118
Bács-Kiskun County	3305	Kiskőrös Subregion	Kiskőrös	15	4	54807	1130.33	48
Bács-Kiskun County	3306	Kiskunfélegyháza Subregion	Kiskunfélegyháza	9	1	44986	717.51	63
Bács-Kiskun County	3307	Kiskunhalas Subregion	Kiskunhalas	9	2	44087	826.35	53
Bács-Kiskun County	3308	Kiskunmajsa Subregion	Kiskunmajsa	6	1	19429	485.13	40
Bács-Kiskun County	3309	Kunszentmiklós Subregion	Kunszentmiklós	10	3	29901	802.79	37
Baranya County	3201	Komló Subregion	Komló	19	1	38470	314.60	122
Baranya County	3202	Mohács Subregion	Mohács	43	2	48622	846.29	57
Baranya County	3207	Pécs Subregion	Pécs	39	2	186035	570.83	326
Baranya County	3208	Pécsvárad Subregion	Pécsvárad	19	1	12244	258.49	47
Baranya County	3203	Sásd Subregion	Sásd	27	2	13759	383.87	36
Baranya County	3204	Sellye Subregion	Sellye	35	1	13027	463.33	28
Baranya County	3205	Siklós Subregion	Siklós	53	3	36257	652.99	56
Baranya County	3209	Szentlőrinc Subregion	Szentlőrinc	20	1	14715	270.28	54
Baranya County	3206	Szigetvár Subregion	Szigetvár	46	1	25778	668.91	39
Békés County	3401	Békéscsaba Subregion	Békéscsaba	6	2	74995	450.73	166
Békés County	3407	Békés Subregion	Békés	9	2	41860	633.87	66
Békés County	3408	Gyula Subregion	Gyula	4	2	42264	413.22	102
Békés County	3402	Mezőkovácsháza Subregion	Mezőkovácsháza	18	4	38276	881.49	43
Békés County	3403	Orosháza Subregion	Orosháza	10	3	57127	848.14	67
Békés County	3404	Sarkad Subregion	Sarkad	11	1	22363	570.97	39
Békés County	3405	Szarvas Subregion	Szarvas	8	2	43063	821.57	52
Békés County	3406	Szeghalom Subregion	Szeghalom	9	5	37792	1009.73	37
Borsod-Abaúj-Zemplén County	3512	Abaúj-Hegyköz Subregion	Gönc	24	2	13827	440.47	31
Borsod-Abaúj-Zemplén County	3513	Bodrogköz Subregion	Cigánd	17	1	16113	400.38	40
Borsod-Abaúj-Zemplén County	3502	Edelény Subregion	Edelény	47	2	33795	783.23	43
Borsod-Abaúj-Zemplén County	3503	Encs Subregion	Encs	36	1	23137	449.45	51
Borsod-Abaúj-Zemplén County	3504	Kazincbarcika Subregion	Kazincbarcika	32	2	58047	460.02	126
Borsod-Abaúj-Zemplén County	3514	Mezőcsát Subregion	Mezőcsát	9	1	13688	378.49	36
Borsod-Abaúj-Zemplén County	3505	Mezőkövesd Subregion	Mezőkövesd	21	2	41190	679.62	61
Borsod-Abaúj-Zemplén County	3501	Miskolc Subregion	Miskolc	40	7	261680	1006.37	260
Borsod-Abaúj-Zemplén County	3506	Ózd Subregion	Ózd	29	3	65864	549.74	120
Borsod-Abaúj-Zemplén County	3507	Sárospatak Subregion	Sárospatak	16	1	24246	477.67	51
Borsod-Abaúj-Zemplén County	3508	Sátoraljaújhely Subregion	Sátoraljaújhely	19	2	21708	310.99	70
Borsod-Abaúj-Zemplén County	3509	Szerencs Subregion	Szerencs	18	1	41030	498.92	82
Borsod-Abaúj-Zemplén County	3510	Szikszó Subregion	Szikszó	23	1	18220	299.94	61
Borsod-Abaúj-Zemplén County	3511	Tiszaújváros Subregion	Tiszaújváros	16	1	32423	256.27	127
Borsod-Abaúj-Zemplén County	3515	Tokaj Subregion	Tokaj	11	1	13293	255.80	52
Csongrád County	3601	Csongrád Subregion	Csongrád	4	1	22633	339.24	67
Csongrád County	3602	Hódmezővásárhely Subregion	Hódmezővásárhely	4	2	56902	707.77	80
Csongrád County	3603	Kistelek Subregion	Kistelek	6	1	18152	410.20	44
Csongrád County	3604	Makó Subregion	Makó	17	2	45572	703.74	65
Csongrád County	3605	Mórahalom Subregion	Mórahalom	9	1	25983	534.82	49
Csongrád County	3606	Szeged Subregion	Szeged	12	2	209066	753.10	278
Csongrád County	3607	Szentes Subregion	Szentes	8	1	41058	813.84	50
Fejér County	3708	Aba Subregion	Aba	9		23516	467.16	50
Fejér County	3709	Adony Subregion	Adony	8	2	24525	319.96	77
Fejér County	3701	Bicske Subregion	Bicske	16	1	38154	618.73	62
Fejér County	3702	Dunaújváros Subregion	Dunaújváros	9	2	71268	371.73	192
Fejér County	3703	Enying Subregion	Enying	9	1	20075	433.11	46
Fejér County	3704	Gárdony Subregion	Gárdony	9	2	27686	265.15	104
Fejér County	3710	Martonvásár Subregion	Martonvásár	7	2	24319	236.65	103
Fejér County	3705	Mór Subregion	Mór	13	2	34431	417.55	82
Fejér County	3706	Sárbogárd Subregion	Sárbogárd	10	1	24281	561.27	43
Fejér County	3707	Székesfehérvár Subregion	Székesfehérvár	18	2	137326	667.14	206
Győr-Moson-Sopron County	3801	Csorna Subregion	Csorna	34	1	33785	598.76	56
Győr-Moson-Sopron County	3802	Győr Subregion	Győr	27	1	184118	742.56	248
Győr-Moson-Sopron County	3803	Kapuvár-Beled Subregion	Kapuvár	18	2	23070	362.72	64
Győr-Moson-Sopron County	3804	Mosonmagyaróvár Subregion	Mosonmagyaróvár	27	2	75121	930.68	81
Győr-Moson-Sopron County	3807	Pannonhalma Subregion	Pannonhalma	18	1	16751	320.55	52
Győr-Moson-Sopron County	3805	Sopron-Fertőd Subregion	Sopron	40	3	100411	877.17	114
Győr-Moson-Sopron County	3806	Tét Subregion	Tét	19	1	18571	375.57	49
Hajdú-Bihar County	3901	Balmazújváros Subregion	Balmazújváros	4	2	28217	731.22	39
Hajdú-Bihar County	3902	Berettyóújfalu Subregion	Berettyóújfalu	29	3	49909	1225.54	41
Hajdú-Bihar County	3903	Debrecen Subregion	Debrecen	2	1	212028	498.59	425
Hajdú-Bihar County	3908	Derecske-Létavértes Subregion	Derecske	10	2	34858	542.89	64
Hajdú-Bihar County	3904	Hajdúböszörmény Subregion	Hajdúböszörmény	3	3	57169	731.05	78
Hajdú-Bihar County	3909	Hajdúhadház Subregion	Hajdúhadház	11	5	60416	635.65	95
Hajdú-Bihar County	3905	Hajdúszoboszló Subregion	Hajdúszoboszló	4	1	33487	506.74	66
Hajdú-Bihar County	3906	Polgár Subregion	Polgár	6	1	13656	383.87	36
Hajdú-Bihar County	3907	Püspökladány Subregion	Püspökladány	13	3	48297	954.96	51
Heves County	4007	Bélapátfalva Subregion	Bélapátfalva	13	1	12008	260.06	46
Heves County	4001	Egr Subregion	Eger	17	1	84142	522.88	161
Heves County	4003	Füzesabony Subregion	Füzesabony	16	1	29910	578.56	52
Heves County	4004	Gyöngyös Subregion	Gyöngyös	25	1	74607	750.78	99
Heves County	4005	Hatvan Subregion	Hatvan	13	2	50585	352.16	144
Heves County	4002	Heves Subregion	Heves	17	2	33382	697.68	48
Heves County	4006	Pétervására Subregion	Pétervására	20	1	20702	475.07	44
Jász-Nagykun-Szolnok County	4601	Jászberény Subregion	Jászberény	18	5	83584	1161.46	72
Jász-Nagykun-Szolnok County	4602	Karcag Subregion	Karcag	5	3	42299	857.26	49
Jász-Nagykun-Szolnok County	4603	Kunszentmárton Subregion	Kunszentmárton	11	2	35176	576.49	61
Jász-Nagykun-Szolnok County	4607	Mezőtúr Subregion	Mezőtúr	5	2	27768	725.74	38
Jász-Nagykun-Szolnok County	4604	Szolnok Subregion	Szolnok	18	4	119380	914.48	131
Jász-Nagykun-Szolnok County	4605	Tiszafüred Subregion	Tiszafüred	13	3	36478	846.59	43
Jász-Nagykun-Szolnok County	4606	Törökszentmiklós Subregion	Törökszentmiklós	8	1	38443	499.58	77
Komárom-Esztergom County	4101	Dorog Subregion	Dorog	15	1	39239	232.57	169
Komárom-Esztergom County	4102	Esztergom Subregion	Esztergom	9	3	56067	304.69	184
Komárom-Esztergom County	4103	Kisbér Subregion	Kisbér	17	1	19968	510.57	39
Komárom-Esztergom County	4104	Komárom Subregion	Komárom	9	3	40107	378.76	106
Komárom-Esztergom County	4105	Oroszlány Subregion	Oroszlány	6	1	26353	199.39	132
Komárom-Esztergom County	4107	Tatabánya Subregion	Tatabánya	10	1	88159	331.65	266
Komárom-Esztergom County	4106	Tata Subregion	Tata	10	1	40307	306.72	131
Nógrád County	4201	Balassagyarmat Subregion	Balassagyarmat	29	1	39623	532.94	74
Nógrád County	4202	Bátonyterenye Subregion	Bátonyterenye	14	1	23541	273.64	86
Nógrád County	4203	Pásztó Subregion	Pásztó	26	1	31292	551.57	57
Nógrád County	4204	Rétság Subregion	Rétság	25	1	24003	435.03	55
Nógrád County	4205	Salgótarján Subregion	Salgótarján	24	1	61736	474.62	130
Nógrád County	4206	Szécsény Subregion	Szécsény	13	1	18738	277.67	67
Pest County	4301	Aszód Subregion	Aszód	9	2	35134	241.39	146
Pest County	4310	Budaörs Subregion	Budaörs	10	4	90103	240.68	374
Pest County	4302	Cegléd Subregion	Cegléd	15	4	119126	1235.55	96
Pest County	4303	Dabas Subregion	Dabas	10	2	44244	498.68	89
Pest County	4311	Dunakesz Subregion	Dunakeszi	4	3	84202	125.17	673
Pest County	4316	Érd Subregion	Érd	4	2	102947	117.95	873
Pest County	4304	Gödöllő Subregion	Gödöllő	12	4	112309	380.87	295
Pest County	4312	Gyál Subregion	Gyál	5	2	46689	286.54	163
Pest County	4305	Monor Subregion	Monor	15	6	112907	449.55	251
Pest County	4306	Nagykáta Subregion	Nagykáta	16	2	75425	710.12	106
Pest County	4313	Pilisvörösvár Subregion	Pilisvörösvár	14	2	69908	245.42	285
Pest County	4307	Ráckeve Subregion	Ráckeve	20	7	147760	628.33	235
Pest County	4314	Szentendre Subregion	Szentendre	13	4	80171	326.58	245
Pest County	4308	Szob Subregion	Szob	13	1	12333	312.62	39
Pest County	4309	Vác Subregion	Vác	19	2	72943	431.78	169
Pest County	4315	Veresegyház Subregion	Veresegyház	8	1	38847	159.82	243
Somogy County	4410	Balatonföldvár Subregion	Balatonföldvár	13	1	11261	241.73	47
Somogy County	4401	Barcs Subregion	Barcs	26	1	23613	696.47	34
Somogy County	4402	Csurgó Subregion	Csurgó	18	1	16594	496.20	33
Somogy County	4403	Fonyód Subregion	Fonyód	11	3	22702	372.82	61
Somogy County	4411	Kadarkút Subregion	Kadarkút	23	2	20137	531.96	38
Somogy County	4404	Kaposvár Subregion	Kaposvár	54	2	99202	1041.14	95
Somogy County	4405	Lengyeltót Subregion	Lengyeltóti	10	1	11260	272.62	41
Somogy County	4406	Marcal Subregion	Marcali	38	1	34799	922.50	38
Somogy County	4407	Nagyatád Subregion	Nagyatád	18	1	25609	647.07	40
Somogy County	4408	Siófok Subregion	Siófok	11	2	39136	415.32	94
Somogy County	4409	Tab Subregion	Tab	24	1	12716	427.24	30
Szabolcs-Szatmár-Bereg County	4501	Baktalórántháza Subregion	Baktalórántháza	19	2	33980	451.73	75
Szabolcs-Szatmár-Bereg County	4502	Csenger Subregion	Csenger	11	1	13126	246.51	53
Szabolcs-Szatmár-Bereg County	4503	Fehérgyarmat Subregion	Fehérgyarmat	49	1	36580	702.58	52
Szabolcs-Szatmár-Bereg County	4511	Ibrány-Nagyhalász Subregion	Ibrány	17	4	43435	520.97	83
Szabolcs-Szatmár-Bereg County	4504	Kisvárda Subregion	Kisvárda	21	2	50852	443.71	115
Szabolcs-Szatmár-Bereg County	4505	Mátészalka Subregion	Mátészalka	26	3	62576	624.70	100
Szabolcs-Szatmár-Bereg County	4506	Nagykálló Subregion	Nagykálló	9	3	43266	518.25	83
Szabolcs-Szatmár-Bereg County	4507	Nyírbátor Subregion	Nyírbátor	20	3	42011	695.94	60
Szabolcs-Szatmár-Bereg County	4508	Nyíregyháza Subregion	Nyíregyháza	9	2	143059	539.29	265
Szabolcs-Szatmár-Bereg County	4509	Tiszavasvár Subregion	Tiszavasvári	10	3	34994	479.00	73
Szabolcs-Szatmár-Bereg County	4510	Vásárosnamény Subregion	Vásárosnamény	27	1	29258	567.25	52
Szabolcs-Szatmár-Bereg County	4512	Záhony Subregion	Záhony	11	2	18734	145.92	128
Tolna County	4701	Bonyhád Subregion	Bonyhád	21	2	27818	377.46	74
Tolna County	4702	Dombóvár Subregion	Dombóvár	16	1	32489	509.02	64
Tolna County	4703	Paks Subregion	Paks	14	2	46953	765.07	61
Tolna County	4704	Szekszárd Subregion	Szekszárd	26	3	83461	1031.70	81
Tolna County	4705	Tamás Subregion	Tamási	32	3	38395	1019.93	38
Vas County	4801	Celldömölk Subregion	Celldömölk	28	1	24071	474.13	51
Vas County	4802	Csepreg Subregion	Csepreg	16	2	10684	184.86	58
Vas County	4803	Körmend Subregion	Körmend	25	1	20791	330.91	63
Vas County	4804	Kőszeg Subregion	Kőszeg	15	1	18327	185.07	99
Vas County	4805	Őriszentpéter Subregion	Őriszentpéter	22	1	6403	305.23	21
Vas County	4806	Sárvár Subregion	Sárvár	32	2	35417	601.97	59
Vas County	4807	Szentgotthárd Subregion	Szentgotthárd	15	1	14538	233.43	62
Vas County	4808	Szombathely Subregion	Szombathely	40	2	113063	646.36	175
Vas County	4809	Vasvár Subregion	Vasvár	23	1	13164	374.14	35
Veszprém County	4910	Ajka Subregion	Ajka	12	1	40172	355.76	113
Veszprém County	4902	Balatonalmád Subregion	Balatonalmádi	10	3	26482	264.18	100
Veszprém County	4903	Balatonfüred Subregion	Balatonfüred	21	1	22892	324.40	71
Veszprém County	4911	Devecser Subregion	Devecser	27	1	13768	387.67	36
Veszprém County	4904	Pápa Subregion	Pápa	49	1	58882	1021.10	58
Veszprém County	4905	Sümeg Subregion	Sümeg	21	1	15007	306.41	49
Veszprém County	4906	Tapolca Subregion	Tapolca	33	2	33901	540.30	63
Veszprém County	4907	Várpalota Subregion	Várpalota	7	2	36793	280.78	131
Veszprém County	4908	Veszprém Subregion	Veszprém	20	2	85632	643.75	133
Veszprém County	4909	Zirc Subregion	Zirc	16	1	19857	339.30	59
Zala County	5007	Hévíz Subregion	Hévíz	8	1	12807	123.60	104
Zala County	5001	Keszthely Subregion	Keszthely	16	1	34894	349.32	100
Zala County	5002	Lent Subregion	Lenti	51	1	20755	662.96	31
Zala County	5003	Letenye Subregion	Letenye	27	1	16265	388.69	42
Zala County	5004	Nagykanizsa Subregion	Nagykanizsa	27	1	64520	552.92	117
Zala County	5008	Pacsa Subregion	Pacsa	20	1	10230	278.84	37
Zala County	5005	Zalaegerszeg Subregion	Zalaegerszeg	65	2	95970	788.65	122
Zala County	5009	Zalakaros Subregion	Zalakaros	19	1	12671	311.86	41
Zala County	5006	Zalaszentgrót Subregion	Zalaszentgrót	25	1	17042	327.04	52

== See also ==
- Regions of Hungary
- Counties of Hungary
- Districts of Hungary (from 2013)
  - Subregions of Hungary (until 2013)
- Administrative divisions of the Kingdom of Hungary (until 1918)
  - Counties of the Kingdom of Hungary
- Administrative divisions of the Kingdom of Hungary (1941–44)
- List of cities and towns of Hungary
- NUTS:HU
