= House of Monok =

Hungarian Noble House

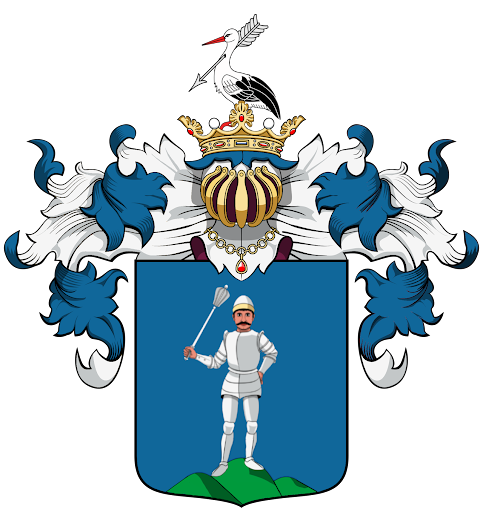
- Parent family: Bogátradvány genus
- Founder: Elijah Monoky
- Titles: Ispán; Alispán; Hereditary Baron; Lord; Noble
- Motto: Hűséggel és vitézséggel (With loyalty and with valour)
- Cadet branches: House of Dobi

The House of Monok (Hungarian: Monoky Család), alternatively spelled Monaky, Monoky, or Monoki was a Hungarian noble dynasty which held power from the 13th century until the 17th century. The earliest ancestors of the House of Monok are of the Clan of Bogát, founded in the late 9th century. The Bogátradvány genus are the predecessors of the Monoky along with other Hungarian noble families, including the House of Rákóczi.

== Name ==
The origins of the village name "Monok" are uncertain. Allegedly, the name of the village is derived from Slavic monoh meaning monk.

The name of the family originates from the family taking on the name of the village, the first documented person with such a name was Illés Monoky who lived during the 13th century. The House of Monok is documented as being originally derived from the Bogát-Radvány (genus) with land being given to the family, namely the village of Monok, for military service. The family, then adopted the name of the village of which they had ownership of leading the family to become known and documented as the Monoks.

The first documented person with such a name was Elijah Monoky who lived during the 13th century.

== History ==
=== Lords in Monok ===
The person of Illés is typically listed in documentation under the name of either Alexander or Elijah. The names of the descendants on all genealogical trees, however, perfectly match the descendants of the individual as well as significant dates in the family, which means that both are the same person yet identified differently. During the Tatar invasion, Elijah Monoky held ownership and Lordship over Monok, both the village and family of Monok were not struck nor pillaged by Mongol forces during this conflict. Count Ladislaus, the son of Elijah, would go on to be the first member of the Monok dynasty to extensively use the name "Monok" in records. Lord Elijah Monoky is mentioned in Hungarian records as being born between 1217 and 1277. Count Ladislaus participated in the Battle of Rozgony (1312) on the side of King Charles Robert. Among the sons of Ladislaus (d. 1310 and 1333), Michael I was the Viscount of Sáros, while Simon was the vice-Master of the Treasury. Sandrin, son of Michael I, was a master carpenter. Among Sandrin's sons, Stephen was a guard cannoneer in Fehérvár, and Peter was a prominent Catholic clergyman of Szabolcs. The successor of Ladislaus I was his son, Simon Monoky, held Lordship over the Monok lands, which he led for a great part of the mid 14th century. During his tenure as Lord, Simon would obtain ownership of Bekecs and ownership of Szada prior to his death in 1369.

The Coat of Arms of Michael III, as seen on the National Archives of Hungary website

Michael II's son, Nicholas I, would inherit Monok when his father died, and Nicholas I's son, Michael Monoky de Monok III, reigned in the latter half of the 1400s. Mihály Monoky de Monok II held power until his death in the early 1500s, and during his tenure became a Lord of Lúcz, due to the Monoks' blood relation to the House of Lúcz. However, the Barony of Lúcz would later be lost near permanently after the death of the Monok main line in the 17th century. It is from Mihály Monoky de Monok II that the first coat of arms of the Monok dynasty is documented.

=== Extinction of the Monoky main line ===
As a result of the service of Nicholas II (d. 1643), he and his descendants were raised to hereditary nobility at the rank of Baron, from King Ferdinand II of Hungary on August 16, 1625, in the Kingdom of Hungary. Among the children born to Baron Nicholas II Monoky and Anna Csetneki, the male line of the family died out in 1643 due to the early death of their son John. His brother, the vice-governor of Abaúj County, Francis Monoky, had only one son, Stephen, whose son, colonel Francis Monoky, was reportedly seen fighting alongside Prince Rákóczi in 1703. According to historical research he died, without leaving any surviving offspring. As a result, the Monoky family estates were passed down to the daughters' branches. Francis Monoky's daughters, from his marriage to Katalin Báthory of Gagy, included Kata Monoky, who married László Fáy, a councillor to Palatine Wesselényi and vice-governor of Borsod County, thus increasing the Fáy estates. Another daughter, Sophia Monoky, married George Lenkey of Lenke and Zadorfalu. Baron Nicholas II Monoky's daughter, Anna, became the wife of Mátyás Andrássy of Csíkszentkirály, which led to the Andrássy family inheriting significant properties, including the Monok family castle.

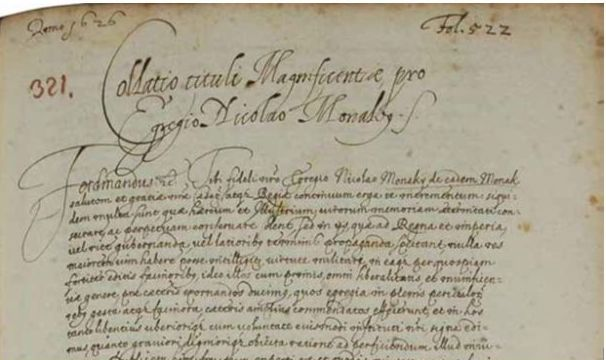
Nicholas (Miklós) Monoky obtains the title of Baron in 1626 (Libri Regii)

John Monoky de Monok III would become the next Baron, it is noted that he rebuilt the castle of Monok. Another achievement of John III was that of becoming the Captain of the castle of Fülek during military service. Nicholas II, son of John III, then adopted the title of Baron of Monok, later achieving Baronship through his connections and alignment with King Ferdinand II of Hungary, consisting of service in the military and holding an administrative position. In 1625, when Nicholas II received the title of Baron with a red seal from King Ferdinand, the title was hereditary and thus went to himself and his family, allowing for other family members to inherit the title.

=== Consolidation and Continuation ===
The Coat of Arms of Francis (Ferencz) Monoki, as seen on the National Archives of Hungary website

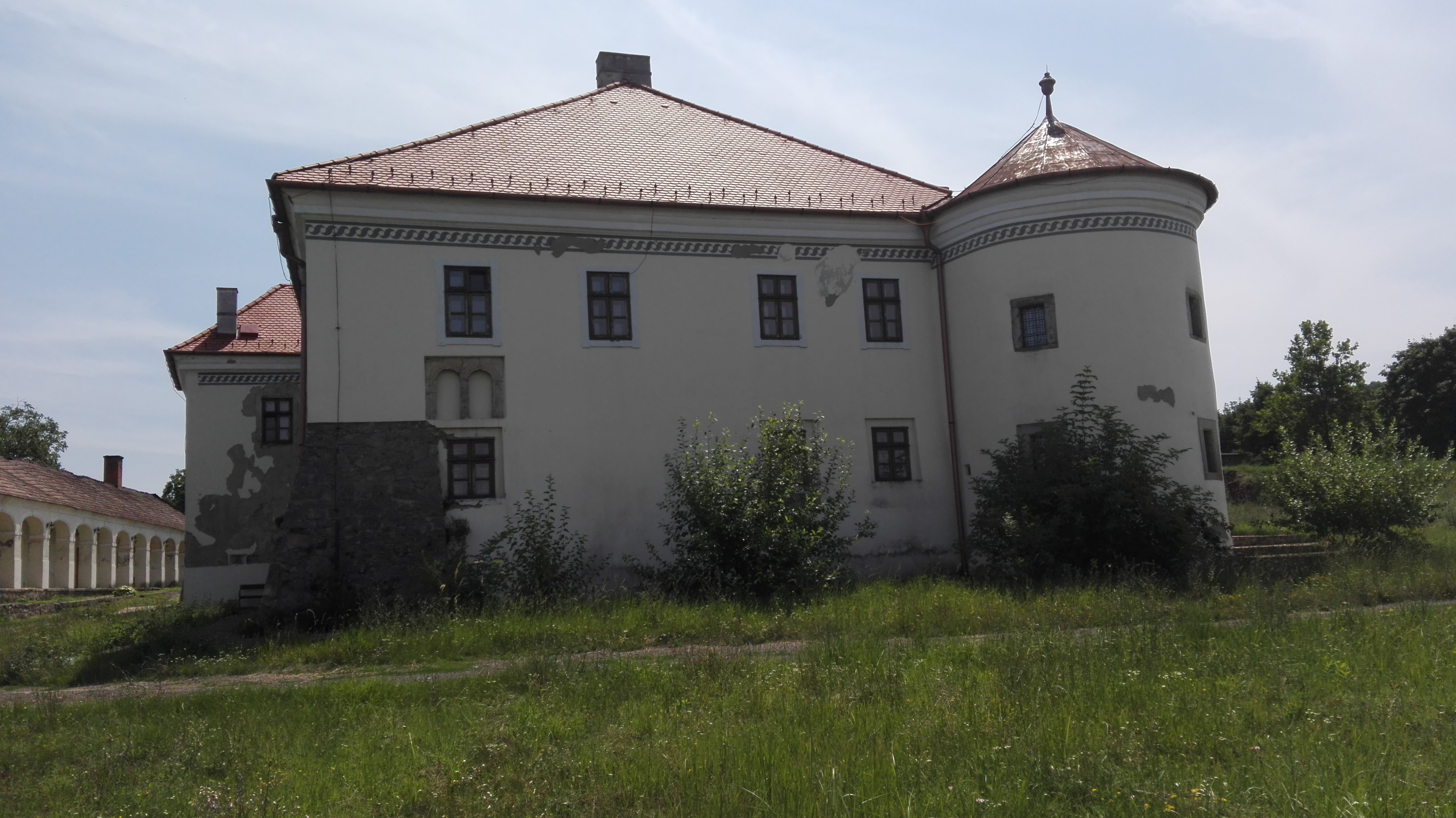
Castle of Monok

The cadet branches such as the Doby (also written as "Dobi") would still prosper. Péter Monoky de Monok's son, Miklós Monoky de Monok, was of the same generation of the famous Baron Miklós Monoky de Monok. Francis Monoky would have to contend with the continuation of these issues in his own life. Among what is known of Francis II is his coat of arms which was documented in 1694, 1703, and 1707.

== Notable family members ==
Illés de Monak (fl. 1277), took on the name of Monok.

László Monoky (fl. 1310-1333), Son of above.

- Mihály Monoky (fl. 1362), Son of above, Alispán of Sáros.
  - Sandrin de Monok (fl. 1395), Master of the Stewards. Son of above.
  - István Monoky, Canon (őrkanonok) of Fehérvár. Brother of above.
  - Péter de Dob (fl. 1373-1406), Főispán of Szabolcs. Brother of above.
  - Ilona Monoky (fl. 1367-1400), married László Tornai.
- Simon Monoky (fl. 1349-1370), vice-Master of the Treasury. Son of László Monoky.
- János Monoky († 1598), Captain of Fülek Castle.
- Baron Mihály Monoky de Monok († 1644), Son of above. Captain of Ónod (1607), received the title of baron for the Monoky family in 1625 from King Ferdinand II.
- Ferencz Monoky, Alispán of Abaúj. Brother of above.
- Ferencz Monoki (fl. 1703-1709), Grandson of above. Kuruc colonel under Ferenc Rákóczi during Rákóczi's War of Independence.

== See also ==
- Báró (in Hungarian)
- Hungarian nobility
- List of titled noble families in the Kingdom of Hungary
- Tripartitum

== Sources ==
- "Doby család." Arcanum, National Archives of Hungary, https://www.arcanum.com/en/online-kiadvanyok/Nagyivan-nagy-ivan-magyarorszag-csaladai-1/harmadik-kotet-1435/doby-csalad-203D/.
- Karácsonyi, János. (1901) "A magyar nemzetségek a XIV. század közepéig." A Pechujfalusi Pechy Csalad Honlapja, pechy-de-pechujfalu.hu, https://www.pechy-de-pechujfalu.hu/myfiles/htmls/karacsonyi/karaxw-Title.html.
- "Monoky Család. (Monoki. †)." Arcanum, National Archives of Hungary, https://www.arcanum.com/hu/online-kiadvanyok/Nagyivan-nagy-ivan-magyarorszag-csaladai-1/hetedik-kotet-5828/monoky-csalad-monoki-6B2C/.
- "Mónoky v. Mónok." Arcanum, National Archives of Hungary, https://www.arcanum.com/hu/online-kiadvanyok/Siebmacher-siebmacher-wappenbuch-1/der-adel-von-ungarn-magyarorszag-2/csaladok-29/monoky-v-monok-5387/.
- Ráth, Mór. Magyar Elektronikus Könyvtár (MEK) / Hungarian Electronic Library, Nagy Iván, https://mek.oszk.hu/09300/09379/pdf/mo_csaladai_07.pdf.
