= Stanča, Slovakia =

Municipality of Slovakia

Stanča Isztáncs
- Municipality
- Flag

- Location of Stanča in the Košice Region Location of Stanča in Slovakia
- Coordinates: 48.57°N 21.65°E
- Country: Slovakia
- Region: Košice Region
- District: Trebišov District
- First mentioned: 1290

Area
  - Total: 5.49 km^{2} (2.12 sq mi)
- Elevation: 120 m (390 ft)

Population (2025)
  - Total: 423
- Time zone: UTC+1 (CET)
  - Summer (DST): UTC+2 (CEST)
- Postal code: 761 6
- Area code: +421 56
- Vehicle registration plate (until 2022): TV
- Website: obec.stanca.sk

Stanča (Hungarian: Isztáncs) is a village and municipality in the Trebišov District in the Košice Region of south-eastern Slovakia.

== History ==
In historical records the village was first mentioned in 1290.

== Geography ==
The municipality lies at an altitude of 120 metres (390 ft) and covers an area of 5.49 km^{2} (2.12 sq mi) (2025).

== Population ==
Population statistic (10 years)
Year	1995	2005	2015	2025
Count	418	434	409	423
Difference		+3.82%	−5.76%	+3.42%

Population statistic
Year	2024	2025
Count	421	423
Difference		+0.47%

It has a population of 423 people (31 December 2025).

=== Ethnicity ===
Census 2021 (1+ %)
Ethnicity	Number	Fraction
Slovak	384	96.24%
Romani	42	10.52%
Not found out	13	3.25%
Rusyn	6	1.5%
Czech	4	1%
Total	399	

In year 2021 was 399 people by ethnicity 384 as Slovak, 42 as Romani, 13 as Not found out, 6 as Rusyn, 4 as Czech and 1 as Polish.

Note on population: The difference values of population numbers in the table "Population statistic" and in the sections "Ethnicity" & "Religion" is caused by the use of various statistical methods.

=== Religion ===
Census 2021 (1+ %)
Religion	Number	Fraction
Greek Catholic Church	160	40.1%
Roman Catholic Church	159	39.85%
None	23	5.76%
Eastern Orthodox Church	20	5.01%
Jehovah's Witnesses	17	4.26%
Not found out	13	3.26%
Total	399	

In year 2021 was 399 people by religion 160 from Greek Catholic Church, 159 from Roman Catholic Church, 23 from None, 20 from Eastern Orthodox Church, 17 from Jehovah's Witnesses, 13 from Not found out, 3 from Apostolic Church, 2 from Calvinist Church and 2 from Evangelical Church.

== Facilities ==
The village has a public library and a football pitch.
