= Taktakenéz =

- Village
- Flag Coat of arms

- Location of Taktakenéz
- Coordinates: 48.05044°N 21.21737°E
- Country: Hungary
- Region: Northern Hungary
- County: Borsod-Abaúj-Zemplén
- District: Szerencs

Area
  - Total: 19.74 km^{2} (7.62 sq mi)

Population (1 January 2026)
  - Total: 1,057
  - Density: 53.55/km^{2} (138.7/sq mi)
- Time zone: UTC+1 (CET)
  - Summer (DST): UTC+2 (CEST)
- Postal code: 3924
- Area code: (+36) 47
- Website: www.taktakenez.hu

Taktakenéz is a village in Borsod-Abaúj-Zemplén County in northeastern Hungary.
