= Iuliu Ilyés =

Rouman-Hungarian engineer and politician

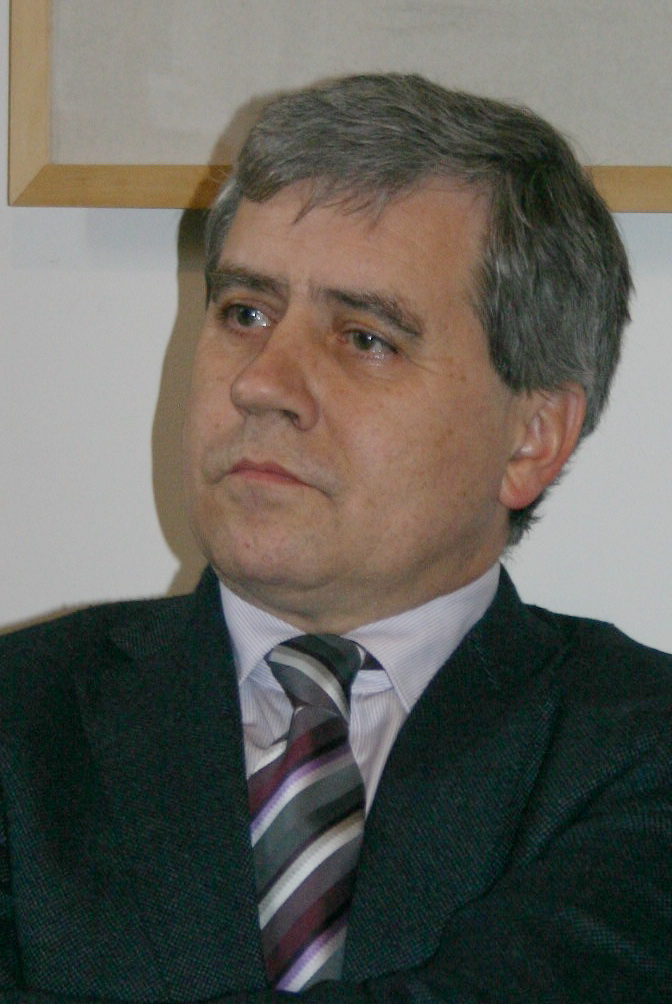
Image: László Horváth

Iuliu Ilyés (born April 25, 1957, in Satu Mare) is a Romanian engineer and politician of Hungarian ethnicity. A member of the Democratic Union of Hungarians in Romania (UDMR), he was the mayor of Satu Mare for two terms, from 2004 until 2012. Between 1996 and 2004 he was the deputy mayor of the city. He is married to Ildikó and has two children.

== Biography ==
He was born to ethnic Hungarian parents in Satu Mare. After graduating high school, he studied engineering at the Polytechnic University of Timișoara, graduating in 1982. Following postgraduate studies at the Bucharest Academy of Economic Studies, which he finished in 2001, he attended several postgraduate seminars in Budapest-Hungary, Opatija-Croatia and the United States. Ilyés worked as an engineer in Satu Mare from 1982 to 1992, while continuing to live in his native city. In 1995 he was hired as an executive manager at Silcomprest SRL, a local company. He began his political activity within the UDMR in 1996, serving as deputy mayor between 1996 and 2004 and as mayor from 2004 to 2012.

The first time when Ilyés became mayor at the 2004 local elections he secured his place with 45.3% of the total suffrage while his direct competitor Radu Bud only obtained 23%. He was re-elected at the 2008 local elections when he obtained 48% and his main competitor Dorel Coica obtained 26.5% of the total votes. Following a rematch at the 2012 local elections, Coica finished ahead, defeating Ilyés on a 49–37.9 margin.

Within the UDMR, Ilyés has served as President of the Satu Mare County Chapter since 1999, and since 2005 he is president of the National Council of Local UDMR Mayors.
