= Taktaszada =

- Village
- Flag Coat of arms

- Location of Taktaszada
- Coordinates: 48.11019°N 21.16883°E
- Country: Hungary
- Region: Northern Hungary
- County: Borsod-Abaúj-Zemplén
- District: Szerencs

Area
  - Total: 25.74 km^{2} (9.94 sq mi)

Population (1 January 2026)
  - Total: 1,738
  - Density: 67.52/km^{2} (174.9/sq mi)
- Time zone: UTC+1 (CET)
  - Summer (DST): UTC+2 (CEST)
- Postal code: 3921
- Area code: (+36) 47
- Website: www.taktaszada.hu

Taktaszada is a village in Borsod-Abaúj-Zemplén county, Hungary.
