= Rátka =

- Village
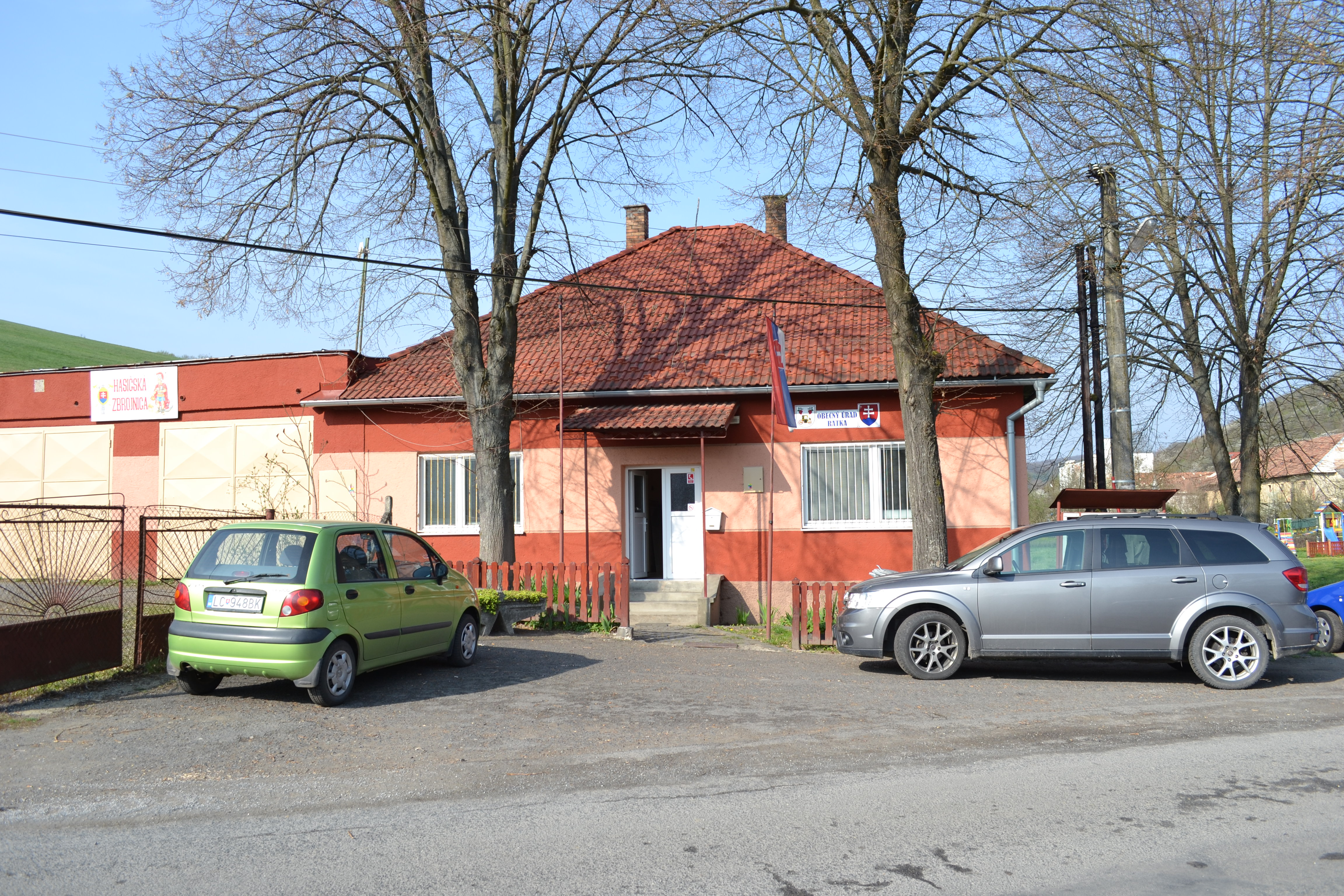
- Village hall

- Flag Coat of arms

- Location within Hungary
- Coordinates: 48.2142°N 21.2258°E
- Country: Hungary
- Regions: Northern Hungary
- County: Borsod-Abaúj-Zemplén County
- Time zone: UTC+1 (CET)
  - Summer (DST): UTC+2 (CEST)

Rátka is a village in Borsod-Abaúj-Zemplén County in northeastern Hungary.
