= Illés =

Illés may refer to:

== People ==
- Béla Illés (born 1968), Hungarian footballer
- Béla Illés (writer) (1895-1974), Hungarian writer and journalist
- Jenö Illés (1877–1951), Hungarian-German cinematographer and film director
- György Illés (1914–2006), Hungarian cinematographer who collaborated with Zoltán Fábri
- Márton Illés (born 1975), Hungarian composer and pianist

== Other uses ==
- Illés (band), Hungarian rock band (1960–1973)
