= Taktaharkány =

- Large village
- Flag Coat of arms

- Location of Taktaharkány
- Coordinates: 48.09096°N 21.12802°E
- Country: Hungary
- Region: Northern Hungary
- County: Borsod-Abaúj-Zemplén
- District: Szerencs

Area
  - Total: 39.13 km^{2} (15.11 sq mi)

Population (1 January 2026)
  - Total: 3,402
  - Density: 86.94/km^{2} (225.2/sq mi)
- Time zone: UTC+1 (CET)
  - Summer (DST): UTC+2 (CEST)
- Postal code: 3922
- Area code: (+36) 47
- Website: taktaharkany.hu

Taktaharkány is a village in Borsod-Abaúj-Zemplén County in northeastern Hungary.

== Sister cities ==
- Attert (Belgium) since 2003
