= Mád =

Mád מאדע (in Yiddish)
- Village
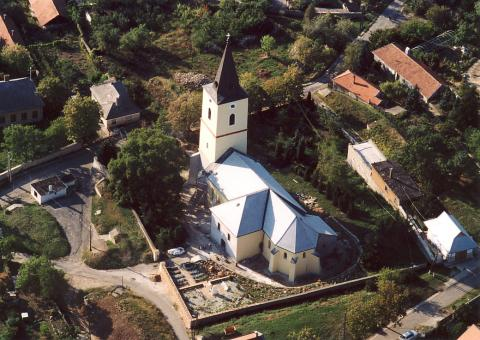
- Holy Trinity Church in Mád

- Flag Coat of arms

- Location of Mád
- Coordinates: 48.18981°N 21.27653°E
- Country: Hungary
- Region: Northern Hungary
- County: Borsod-Abaúj-Zemplén
- District: Szerencs

Area
  - Total: 31.86 km^{2} (12.30 sq mi)

Population (1 January 2026)
  - Total: 1,784
  - Density: 55.99/km^{2} (145.0/sq mi)
- Time zone: UTC+1 (CET)
  - Summer (DST): UTC+2 (CEST)
- Postal code: 3909
- Area code: (+36) 47
- Website: www.mad.info.hu

Mád (Yiddish: מאדע Made) is a village in Borsod-Abaúj-Zemplén County in northeastern Hungary.

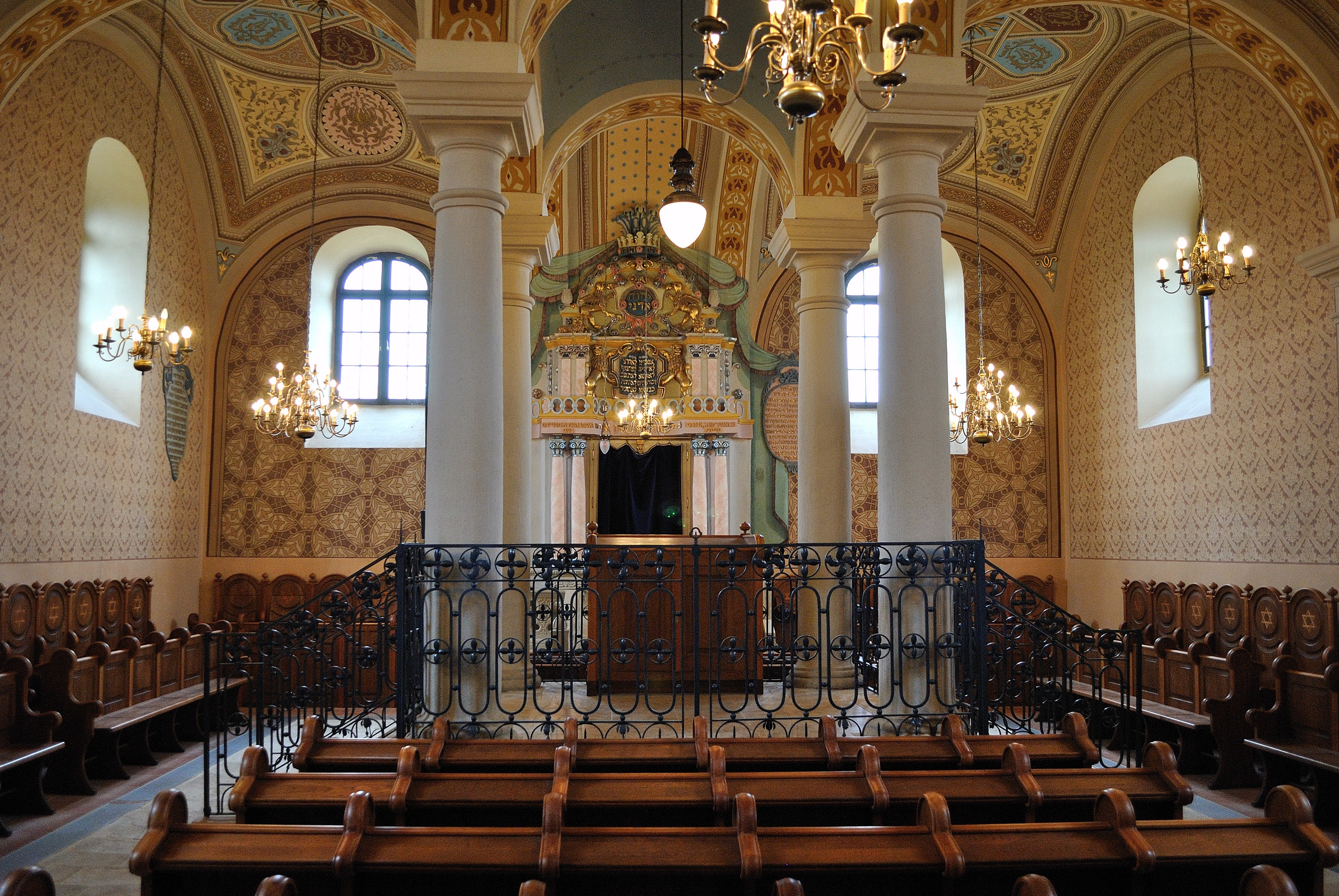
Mád Synagogue interior

The former Jewish synagogue (1795) in Mád was restored between 2000 and 2004 with aid from the World Monuments Fund.
