= Tiszalúc =

- Large village
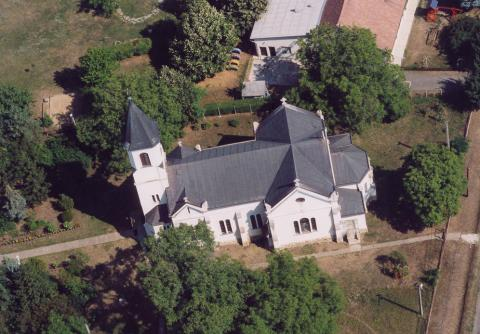

- Flag Coat of arms

- Location of Tiszalúc
- Coordinates: 48.03675°N 21.06292°E
- Country: Hungary
- Region: Northern Hungary
- County: Borsod-Abaúj-Zemplén
- District: Szerencs

Area
  - Total: 44.88 km^{2} (17.33 sq mi)

Population (1 January 2026)
  - Total: 4,677
  - Density: 104.2/km^{2} (269.9/sq mi)
- Time zone: UTC+1 (CET)
  - Summer (DST): UTC+2 (CEST)
- Postal code: 3565
- Area code: (+36) 46
- Website: www.tiszaluc.hu

Tiszalúc is a village in Borsod-Abaúj-Zemplén County in northeastern Hungary.
