= Alsódobsza =

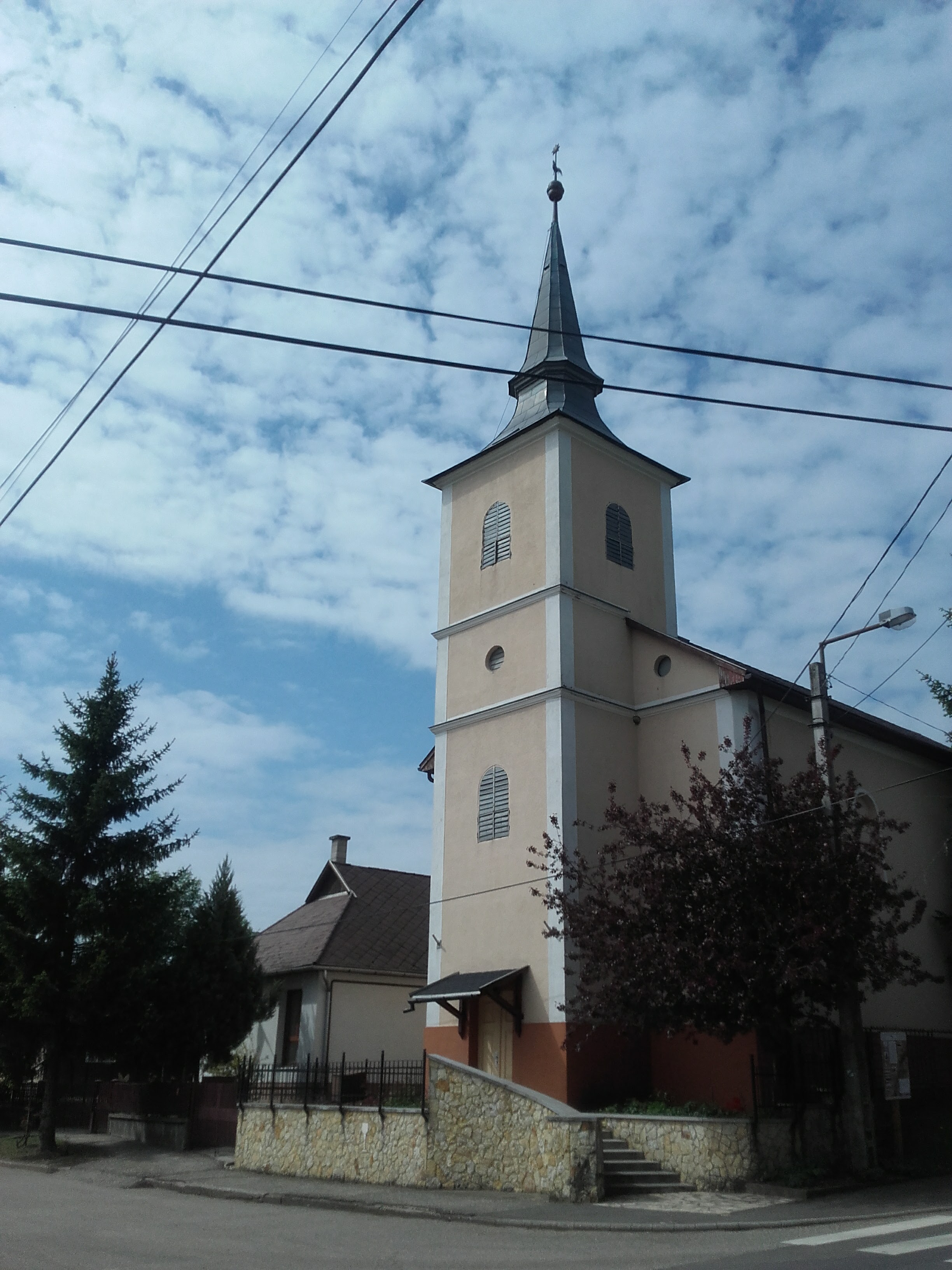
- Church, Alsódobsza

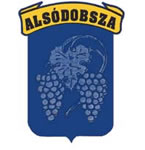
- Coat of arms

- Location of Borsod-Abaúj-Zemplén county in Hungary

- Location of Alsódobsza
- Coordinates: 48.17999°N 21.00178°E
- Country: Hungary
- County: Borsod-Abaúj-Zemplén

Area
  - Total: 10.69 km^{2} (4.13 sq mi)

Population (2015)
  - Total: 287
  - Density: 26.8/km^{2} (69.5/sq mi)
- Time zone: UTC+1 (CET)
  - Summer (DST): UTC+2 (CEST)
- Postal code: 3717
- Area code: 47

Alsódobsza is a village in Borsod-Abaúj-Zemplén county, Hungary.
