= Prügy =

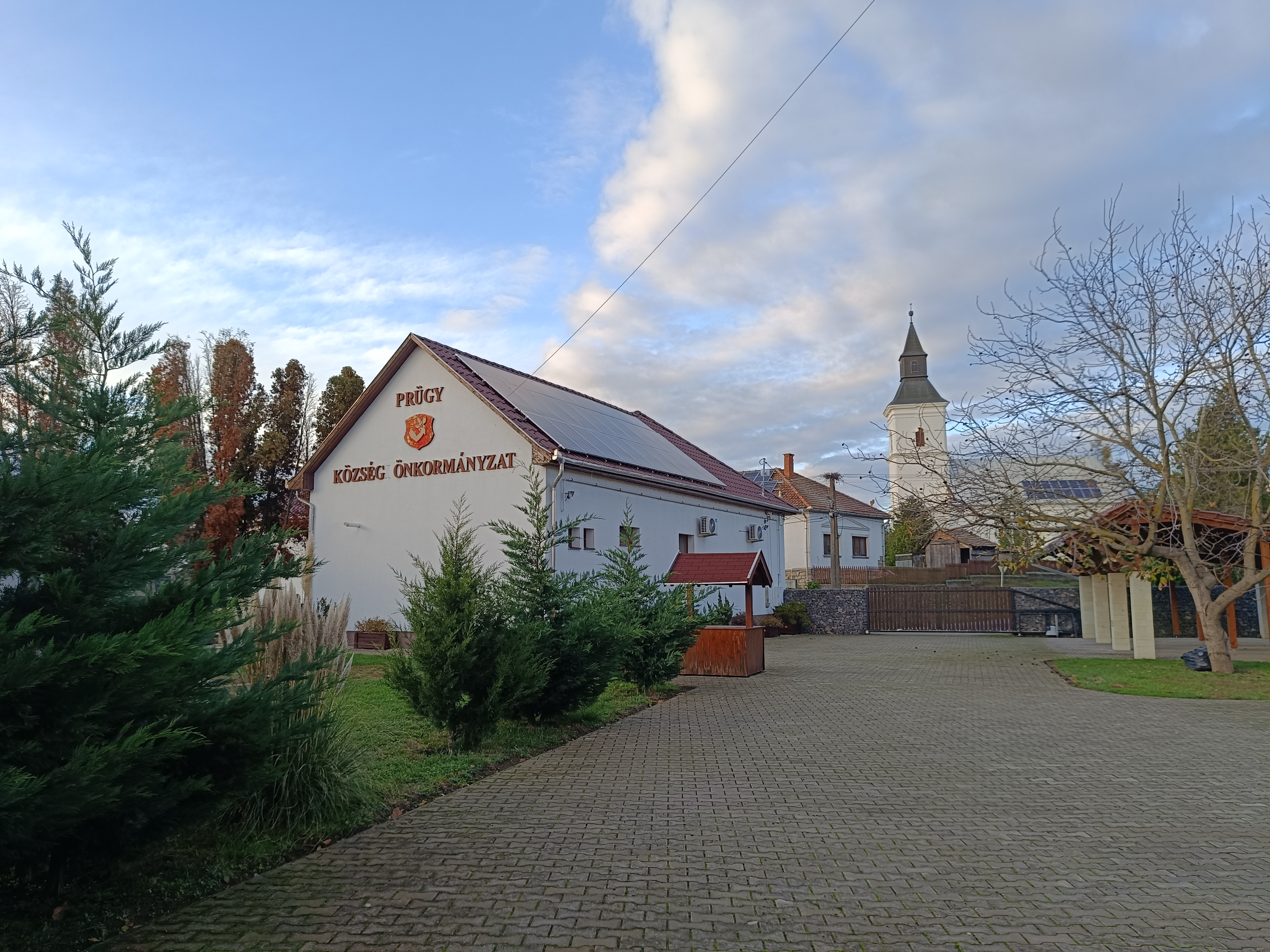
- Town hall

- Coat of arms

- Location of Borsod-Abaúj-Zemplén county in Hungary

- Location of Prügy
- Coordinates: 48.08175°N 21.24305°E
- Country: Hungary
- County: Borsod-Abaúj-Zemplén

Area
  - Total: 31.39 km^{2} (12.12 sq mi)

Population (2004)
  - Total: 2,616
  - Density: 83.33/km^{2} (215.8/sq mi)
- Time zone: UTC+1 (CET)
  - Summer (DST): UTC+2 (CEST)
- Postal code: 3925
- Area code: 47

Prügy is a village in Borsod-Abaúj-Zemplén county, Hungary.
