= Legyesbénye =

Coordinates: 48°10′N 21°09′E

- Village
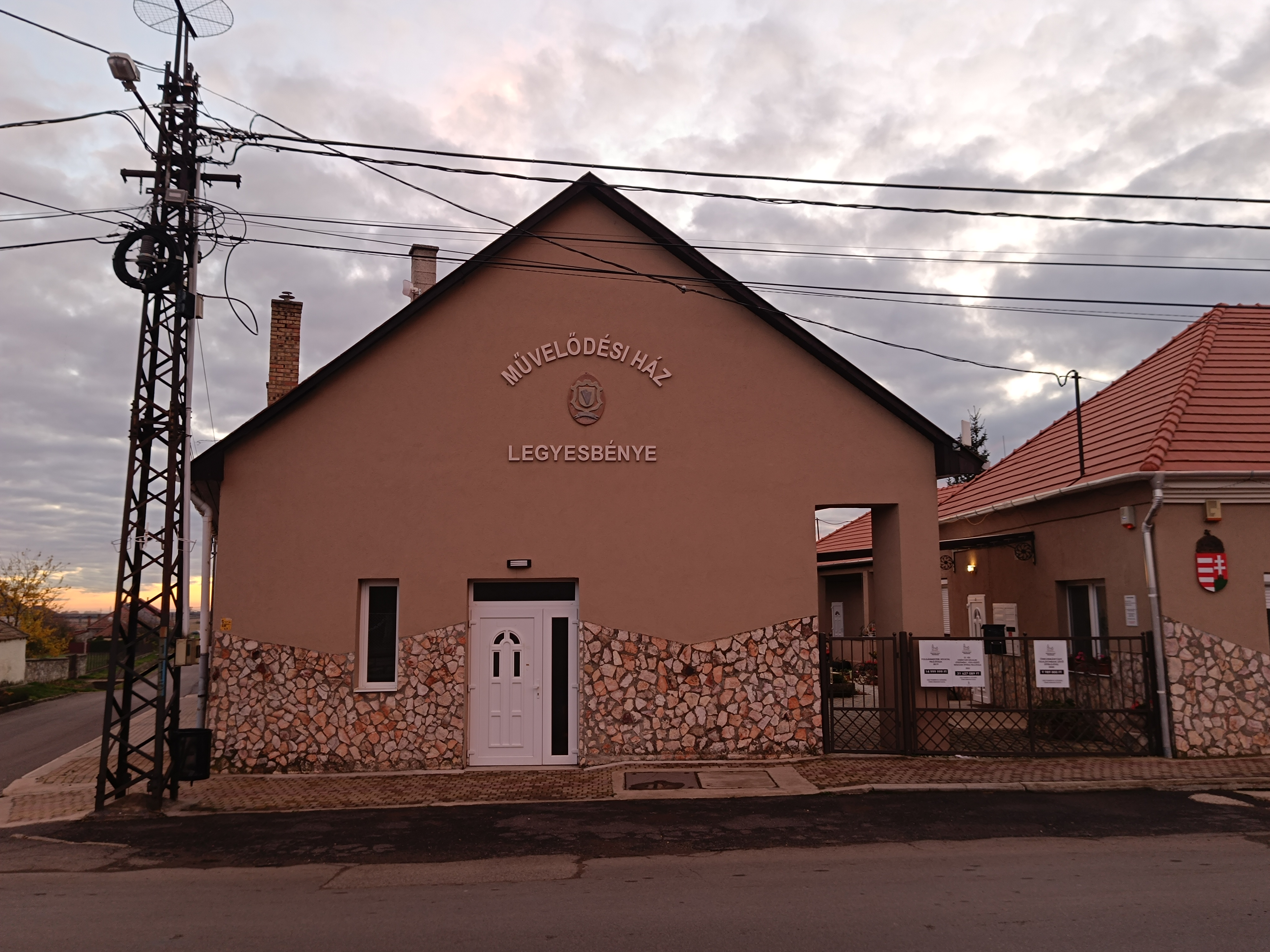
- Town hall

- Coat of arms
- Interactive map of Legyesbénye
- Country: Hungary
- Regions: Northern Hungary
- County: Borsod-Abaúj-Zemplén County
- Time zone: UTC+1 (CET)
  - Summer (DST): UTC+2 (CEST)

Legyesbénye is a village in Borsod-Abaúj-Zemplén County in northeastern Hungary.
