= Tállya =

- Village
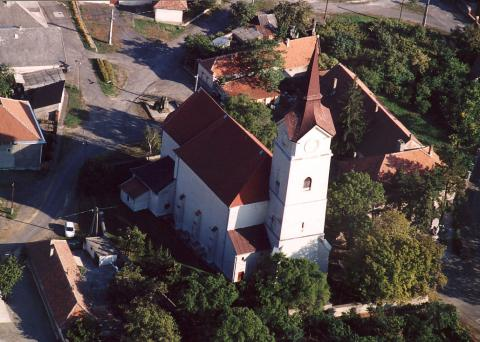
- St. Ladislaus Catholic church

- Flag Coat of arms

- Location of Tállya
- Coordinates: 48.2361°N 21.22574°E
- Country: Hungary
- Region: Northern Hungary
- County: Borsod-Abaúj-Zemplén
- District: Szerencs

Area
  - Total: 37.94 km^{2} (14.65 sq mi)

Population (1 January 2026)
  - Total: 1,558
  - Density: 41.06/km^{2} (106.4/sq mi)
- Time zone: UTC+1 (CET)
  - Summer (DST): UTC+2 (CEST)
- Postal code: 3907
- Area code: (+36) 47
- Website: tallya.hu

Tállya is a village in Borsod-Abaúj-Zemplén county, Northern Hungary, 45 kilometres from county seat Miskolc, in the famous Tokaj-Hegyalja wine district.

== Geography ==
Tállya is located at 48°14′N 21°13′E. According to the 2001 Census the village has a total area of 37.96 km^{2} (15 sq mi).

== Demographics ==
As of the census of 2001, there were 2205 people residing in the village; 98.4% Magyars, 1.3% Romani, and 0.3% other. The population density was 58/km^{2}. There were 1004 housing units at an average density of 26.44/km^{2}.

== History ==
The area has been inhabited since ancient times. The village was first mentioned in the 13th century. According to some sources the area was settled by Walloon settlers, who brought viticulture to the area; the name of the village possibly comes from the French word taille (meaning "cutting", referring that the trees of forests on the hills had to be cut so that vine can grow there).

Tállya soon became the most important village of the Tokaj-Hegyalja wine district. A letter by Bishop Andrew from 1272 mentions that after the Mongol invasion (1241–42) Italians settled down in the area. Tállya also had a castle by then, which has been destroyed since then, but some of the ruins still can be seen.

From 1584 Tállya's Protestant pastor was Gáspár Károli, who was the first to translate the Bible to Hungarian.

In the 17th century Tállya was already mentioned as a town, surrounded by a wall and a moat. In 1631 Ferdinand II gave the town right to hold a market and exempted its citizens from taxes. In 1683 Imre Thököly and his supporters met in Tállya during his fight to free Hungary from Habsburg rule; after the freedom fight the imperial troops pillaged the area, which led to the Hegyalja uprising in 1697.

In a census from the mid-1780s Tállya was the largest town of Zemplén county with a population of 4388. The quick development of the town was mostly due to its vineyards and its hospitality. Anyone who wanted to settle down in Tállya was exempt from paying taxes for 12 years if they planted a vineyard. Still Tállya lost its town rights in 1896 because it couldn't afford paying the expenses of being a town.

In 1928 a pyroxene and andesite mine was opened.

World War I and II claimed the lives of 110 and 87 Tállya soldiers, respectively. Soviet troops occupied the village on 14 December 1944.

After the war the population started to decrease mostly because the village's distance from main roads, the lack of markets for wine, the decreasing price of wine, and the Socialist regime's industrial politics which tended to favor the major cities over smaller settlements. By 1980 Tállya had only 2815 residents.

== Sport ==
The association football club, Tállya KSE, is based in Tállya.

== Gallery ==
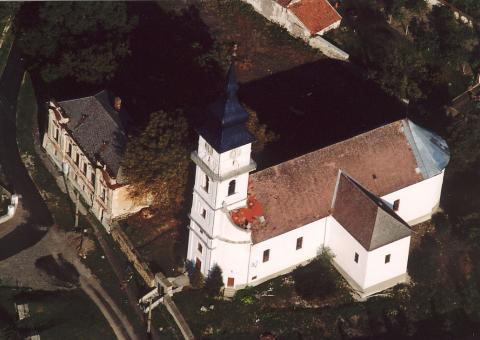

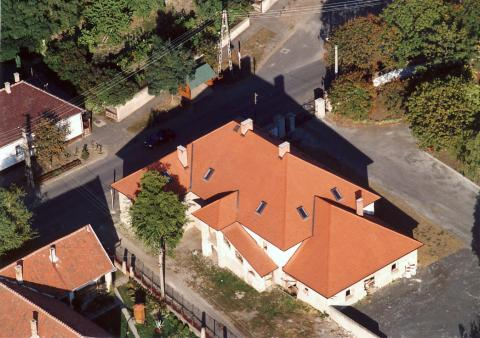

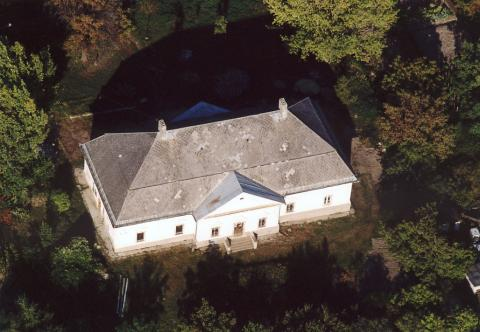

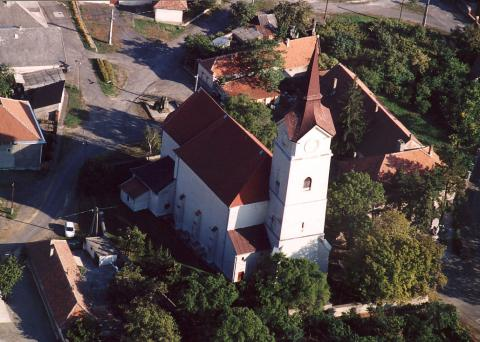
