= Golop =

- Location of Borsod-Abaúj-Zemplén county in Hungary

- Location of Golop
- Coordinates: 48.23716°N 21.18850°E
- Country: Hungary
- County: Borsod-Abaúj-Zemplén

Area
  - Total: 9.43 km^{2} (3.64 sq mi)

Population (2004)
  - Total: 639
  - Density: 67.76/km^{2} (175.5/sq mi)
- Time zone: UTC+1 (CET)
  - Summer (DST): UTC+2 (CEST)
- Postal code: 3906
- Area code: 47

Golop is a village in Borsod-Abaúj-Zemplén county, Hungary. The coat of arms depicts a green shield with two golden bunches of grapes and a golden a grape leaf below. Above the shield is a helmet and crown, with blue-gold and red-silver helmet covers. There are two versions of Golop’s flag; both versions have two equal stripes of green-gold and one also contains the coat of arms.

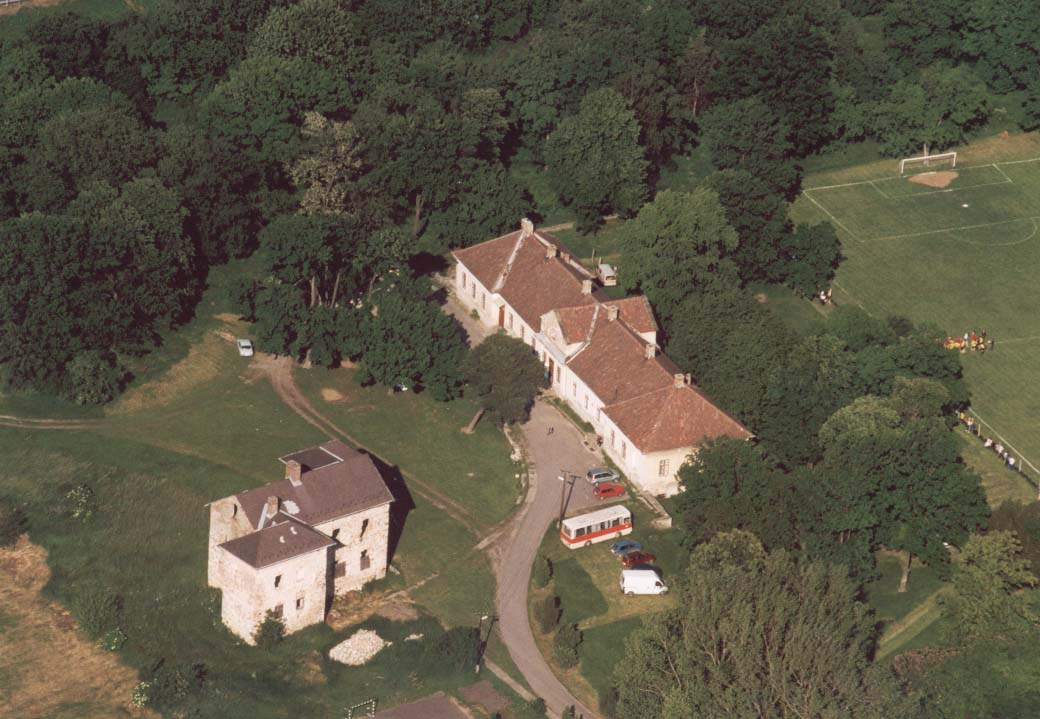
Aerial photography of the Castles of Golop
