= Szerencs =

- Town
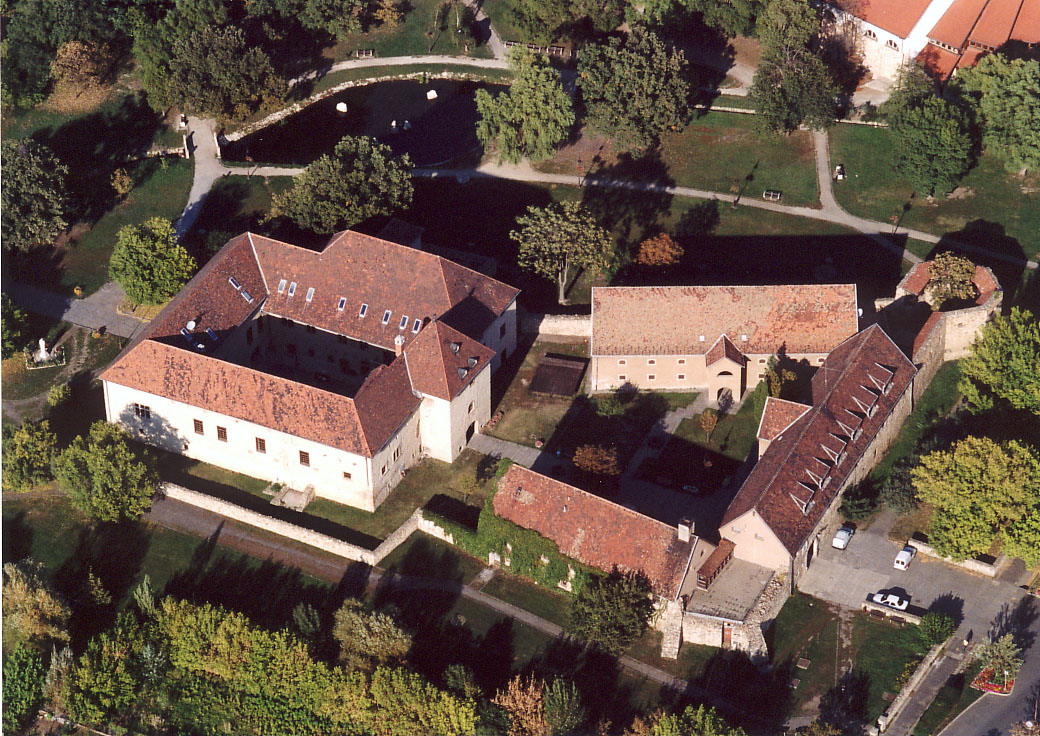
- Szerencs Castle

- Flag Coat of arms

- Location within Hungary
- Coordinates: 48.16228°N 21.20507°E
- Country: Hungary
- County: Borsod-Abaúj-Zemplén
- District: Szerencs

Area
  - Total: 36.69 km^{2} (14.17 sq mi)

Population (2001)
  - Total: 10,184
  - Density: 277.57/km^{2} (718.9/sq mi)
- Time zone: UTC+1 (CET)
  - Summer (DST): UTC+2 (CEST)
- Postal code: 3900
- Area code: (+36) 47

Szerencs (Hungarian pronunciation: [ˈsɛrɛnt͡ʃ]) is a town in Borsod-Abaúj-Zemplén county, Northern Hungary. It lies 35 km (22 mi) away from Miskolc, and 205 km (127 mi) away from Budapest. It has about 9,100 inhabitants.

== History ==
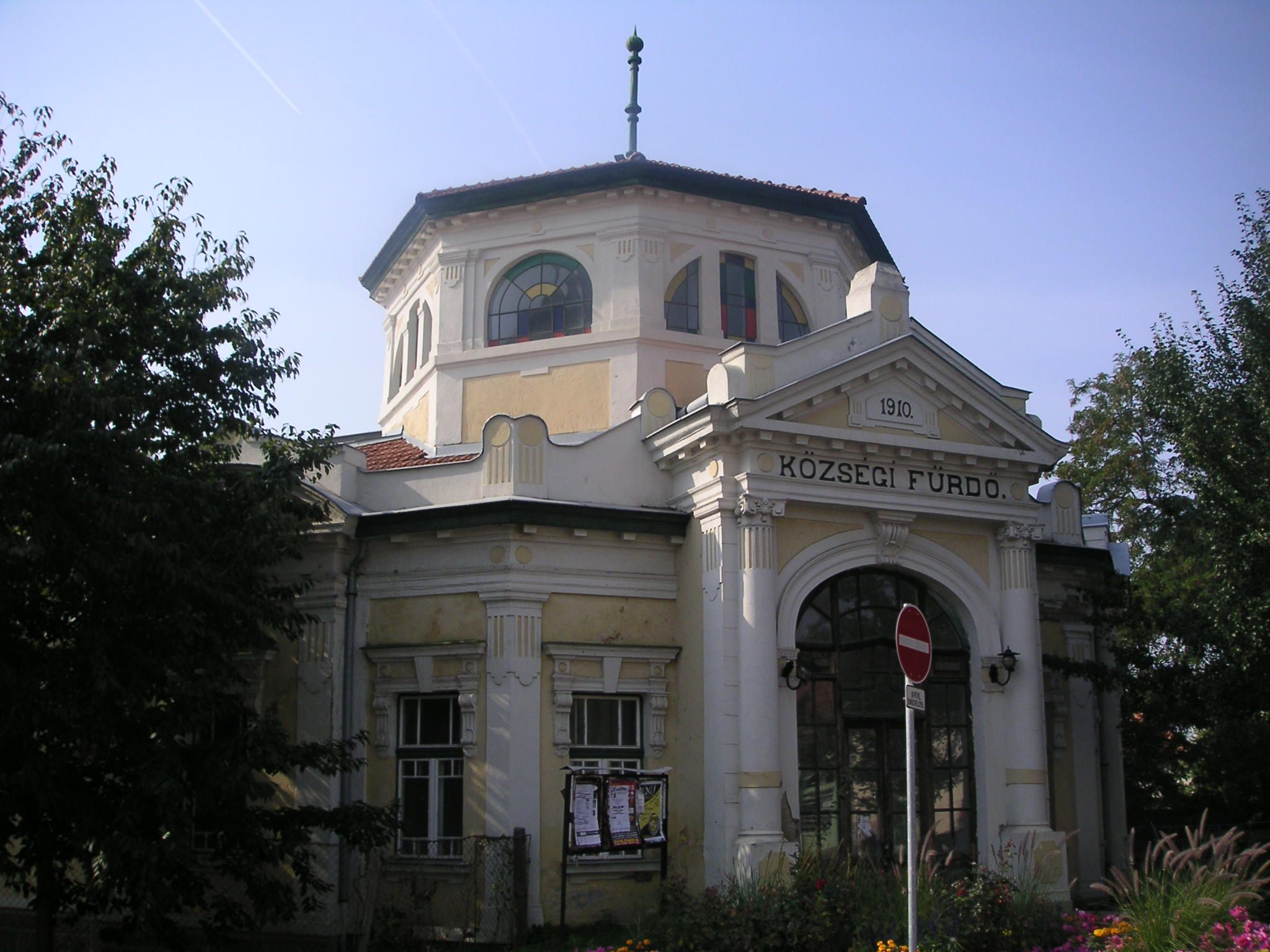
Old bath house in Szerencs

Szerencs grew into a town where the Great Plain and the Zemplén mountains meet. It is the cultural and economic centre of Southern Hegyalja. This small town, with rich historical past, is called the Gate of Hegyalja and due to it was inhabited in ancient times.

The first authentic written record about the one-thousand-year-old Szerencs dates back to a document from the 13th century. In 1241 the monastery of crusaders from St. John-order (the Joannists) stood here, which was named “Szerencs-Abbey of the Apostles called St. Peter and St. Paul”. The documents from the end of the 15th century refer to the settlement as a town.

The most important part of the history of the town can be connected to the era of Zsigmond Rákóczi, around the 16th and 17th centuries.

In 1605 in Szerencs on his land the parliament was convoked where István Bocskai was elected the Governor of Transylvania.

Programme “Day of Szerencs town“ has been organized since 1998 to celebrate this historical event on 20 April, every year.

István Bocskai gave Szerencs the status of a royal town with significant privileges in 1606.

Among the Rákóczi Family the last lord of the Szerencs-castle was Ferenc Rákóczi II. In the 18th century, in the era of Mária Terézia, the settlement began to show slow economic development. Then this development came to a sudden stop and during the administrative reform of 1876 Szerencs was qualified as a large village, i.e. it lost its status as a medieval market town.

Establishing industries at the end of the 19th century gave a new pace to the settlement.

The greatest sugar factory and refinery at that time of Europe were built here during 8 months in 1889. The chocolate factory was built in 1923, and its products made the name of Szerencs known nationally. Between the two world wars the settlement developed, but not at an earlier rapid pace. Szerencs had a population of 6707 residents in 1930. The factories, the rolling mill and the quarry provided a decent living for the people living here.

After 1945 Szerencs became the economic, cultural and administrative centre of the district and the modern development of the settlement began in 1960s.

In 1984 the settlement was given town status again.

In the 20th century Szerencs has become a town with its specific atmosphere as a result of urbanizational processes embedded in historical traditions. The educational institutions like the crčche, three nursery schools, two primary schools and two secondary schools, ensure socialization, trade-learning and preparations for higher education at a high level for nearly 3000 children and young people.

International relations of Szerencs enrich the educational and cultural life of the town. Twin town co-operational agreements were concluded with Malchin (1989) and Geisenheim (1989) in Germany, Roznava (1991) in Slovakia and Hesperingen (1997) in Luxembourg. Twin town relations provide opportunities for exchange visits of students, tradition-keeping groups, families and the mutual introduction of cultural values.

Nowadays, the town serves as the engine of the Multi-purpose Microregion of Szerencs Town comprising 18 settlements with its primary and medium level educational establishments, its health care, sports facilities and services.

In recent years, several developments have taken place in the town (construction of a swimming pool, establishing an Industrial Park, creating a flowery city). New developments are also underway: block of flats building program, making up a rainwater and groundwater system, upgrading the existing ambulance center etc.). The ultimate goal is to create a small town of European standard.

== Tourist sights ==
Rákóczi Castle

The history of the castle, built on the ruins of a Benedictine Abbey, goes back to the 1550s. During the war against the Turkish it saw several battles. Between 1586 and 1616 it was the residence of the Rákóczi family. In the second half of the 18th century three towers of the inner castle were demolished, but the southern tower remained. After the War of Independence, led by Ferenc Rákóczi II, the new landlords rebuilt it as a palace, so it lost its characteristics as a castle.

The Huszárvár Hotel, the Zemplén Museum and the Town Cultural Centre are also housed here where the latter organises various programmes attracting tourists. Every June the Hegyalja Smallholders’ Days with grape-wine exhibition, wine competition and folklore programmes are held here.

The Museum of the town rich in history, at the edge of Tokaj-Hegyalja, was opened in 1969. The permanent exhibition of the Zemplén Museum can be seen in six rooms on the first floor of the eastern wing. The exhibits are displayed in four groups. The largest one is placed in three rooms and called the History of Picture Postcards. This collection of picture postcards is still the biggest collection in Hungary: its estimated number is 900,000.

Roman Catholic Church

The Roman Catholic Church, built in baroque style in 1774, and the statue if Saint John from Nepomuk in front of it in Rákóczi Street, have architectural value.

Calvinist Church

The old Calvinist Church, built in Gothic style at the end of the 13th century, can also be found in Rákóczi Street. Zsigmond Rákóczi was buried here in 1609. His red marble tomb can be seen in the nave.

Greek Catholic Church

The Greek Catholic Church, in Ondi Street, was built in the beginning of the 18th century.

== Twin towns – sister cities ==
Szerencs is twinned with:

- Geisenheim, Germany
- Hesperange, Luxembourg
- Malchin, Germany
- Miercurea Nirajului, Romania
- Podgora, Croatia
- Pułtusk, Poland
- Rožňava, Slovakia
