= Gwoźnica =

Gwoźnica may refer to the following places in Poland:

- Gwoźnica Dolna
- Gwoźnica Górna
