= Tadeusz Peiper =

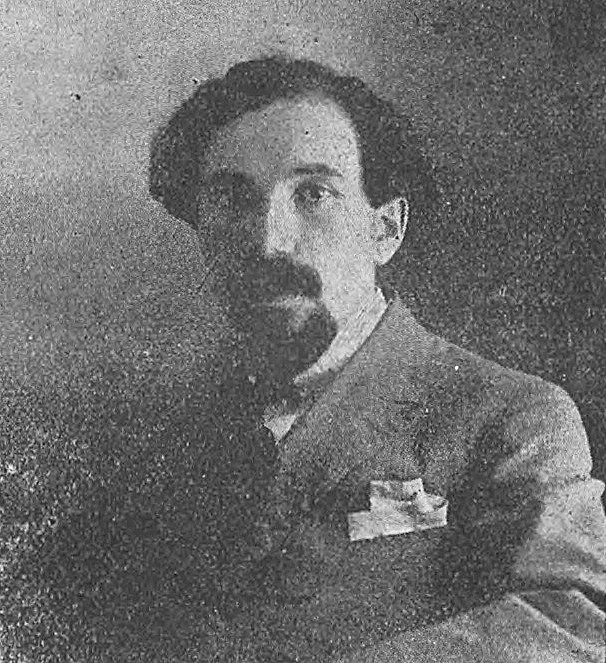
- Born: 3 May 1891; Kraków, Grand Duchy of Kraków, Austria-Hungary
- Died: 10 November 1969 (aged 78); Warsaw, Polish People's Republic
- Writing career
- Language: Polish

Tadeusz Peiper (3 May 1891 – 10 November 1969) was a Polish poet, art critic, theoretician of literature and one of the precursors of the avant-garde movement in Polish poetry. Born to a Jewish family, Peiper converted to Catholicism as a young man and spent several years in Spain. He was a co-founder of the Awangarda krakowska ('Kraków Avant-garde') group of writers.

In 1922, in the Second Polish Republic, he founded the Zwrotnica ('Railroad switch') monthly, devoted mostly to avant-garde movements in contemporary poetry. Although short-lived, the magazine (issued until 1923 and then briefly reactivated between 1926 and 1927), paved the way for young poets of the Awangarda krakowska group, among them Julian Przyboś, Jan Brzękowski and Jalu Kurek. Peiper also published three notable collections of poems, which were among the most notable pieces of constructivist Polish poetry. As an artist, Peiper believed that a writer should resemble a skilled craftsman, able to carefully plan his words. He coined the "3 x M" slogan Miasto, Masa, Maszyna ('City, Mass, Machine'), one of the memes of Polish poetry of the 1920s. Soon after World War II he wrote for Tygodnik Powszechny about Adam Mickiewicz. Until his retirement, Peiper worked for Jerzy Borejsza.
