= Dobrzechów =

- Village
- Location within Poland
- Coordinates: 49°53′N 21°45′E
- Country: Poland
- Voivodeship: Subcarpathian
- County: Strzyżów
- Gmina: Strzyżów

Dobrzechów [dɔˈbʐɛxuf] is a village in the administrative district of Gmina Strzyżów, within Strzyżów County, Subcarpathian Voivodeship, in south-eastern Poland. It lies approximately 3 km (2 mi) west of Strzyżów and 25 km (16 mi) south-west of the regional
