= Zawadka, Strzyżów County =

Zawadka
- Village
- Location within Poland
- Coordinates: 49°56′N 21°42′E
- Country: Poland
- Voivodeship: Subcarpathian
- County: Strzyżów
- Gmina: Strzyżów

Zawadka [zaˈvatka] is a village in the administrative district of Gmina Strzyżów, within Strzyżów County, Subcarpathian Voivodeship, in south-eastern Poland. Zawadka is the largest producer of barley in the county.
