= Kobyle, Podkarpackie Voivodeship =

Kobyle
- Village
- Location within Poland
- Coordinates: 49°50′42″N 21°37′39″E
- Country: Poland
- Voivodeship: Subcarpathian
- County: Strzyżów
- Gmina: Frysztak

Kobyle [kɔˈbɨlɛ] is a village in the administrative district of Gmina Frysztak, within Strzyżów County, Subcarpathian Voivodeship, in south-eastern Poland.
