= Zaborów, Podkarpackie Voivodeship =

Zaborów
- Village
- Location within Poland
- Coordinates: 49°55′N 21°49′E
- Country: Poland
- Voivodeship: Subcarpathian
- County: Strzyżów
- Gmina: Czudec

Zaborów [zaˈbɔruf] is a village in the administrative district of Gmina Czudec, within Strzyżów County, Subcarpathian Voivodeship, in south-eastern Poland.
