= Nowa Wieś, Strzyżów County =

Nowa Wieś
- Village
- Location within Poland
- Coordinates: 49°56′44″N 21°50′17″E
- Country: Poland
- Voivodeship: Subcarpathian
- County: Strzyżów
- Gmina: Czudec
- Population: 870

Nowa Wieś [ˈnɔva ˈvjɛɕ] is a village in the administrative district of Gmina Czudec, within Strzyżów County, Subcarpathian Voivodeship, in south-eastern Poland.
