= Pułanki =

- Village
- Location within Poland
- Coordinates: 49°50′46″N 21°36′40″E
- Country: Poland
- Voivodeship: Subcarpathian
- County: Strzyżów
- Gmina: Frysztak

Pułanki [puˈwaŋkʲi] is a village in the administrative district of Gmina Frysztak, within Strzyżów County, Subcarpathian Voivodeship, in south-eastern Poland.
