= Różanka, Podkarpackie Voivodeship =

Różanka
- Village
- Location within Poland
- Coordinates: 49°54′44″N 21°40′41″E
- Country: Poland
- Voivodeship: Subcarpathian
- County: Strzyżów
- Gmina: Wiśniowa
- Website: www.rozanka.pl

Różanka [ruˈʐaŋka] is a village in the administrative district of Gmina Wiśniowa. It is situated within Strzyżów County, Subcarpathian Voivodeship, in south-eastern Poland.
