= Cieszyna =

- Village
- Location within Poland
- Coordinates: 49°53′N 21°36′E
- Country: Poland
- Voivodeship: Subcarpathian
- County: Strzyżów
- Gmina: Frysztak
- Elevation: 300 m (980 ft)
- Population (approx.): 980

Cieszyna [t͡ɕɛˈʂɨna] is a village in the administrative district of Gmina Frysztak, within Strzyżów County, Subcarpathian Voivodeship, in south-eastern Poland.
