= Wyżne =

- Village
- Location within Poland
- Coordinates: 49°56′N 21°53′E
- Country: Poland
- Voivodeship: Subcarpathian
- County: Strzyżów
- Gmina: Czudec

Wyżne [ˈvɨʐnɛ] is a village in the administrative district of Gmina Czudec, within Strzyżów County, Subcarpathian Voivodeship, in south-eastern Poland.
