= Łętownia, Strzyżów County =

Łętownia
- Village
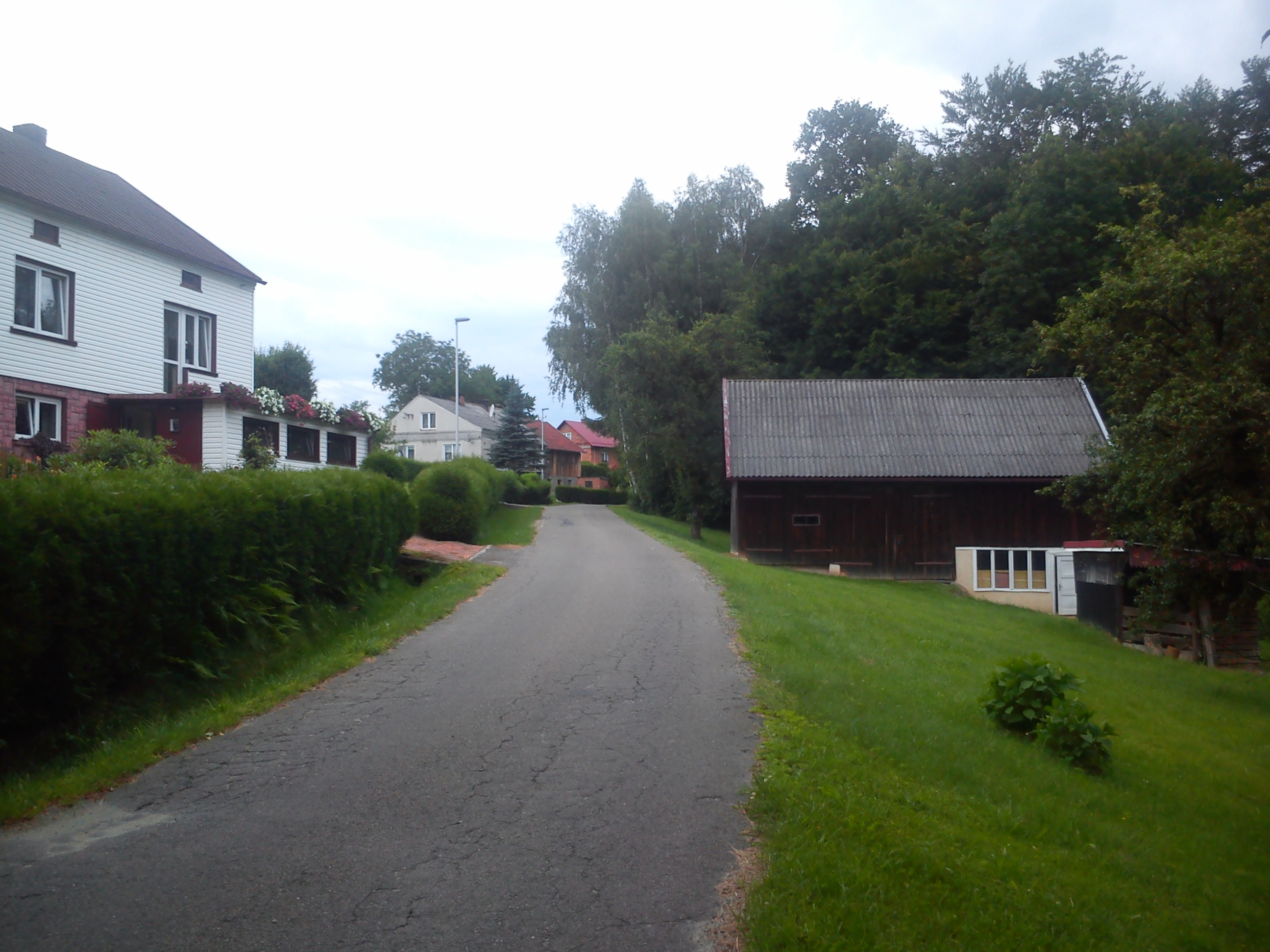

- Location within Poland
- Coordinates: 49°53′50″N 21°46′27″E
- Country: Poland
- Voivodeship: Podkarpackie
- County: Strzyżów
- Gmina: Strzyżów

Łętownia [wɛnˈtɔvɲa] is a village in the administrative district of Gmina Strzyżów, within Strzyżów County, Podkarpackie Voivodeship, in south-eastern Poland.
