= Glinik Zaborowski =

- Village
- Location within Poland
- Coordinates: 49°53′58″N 21°49′33″E
- Country: Poland
- Voivodeship: Subcarpathian
- County: Strzyżów
- Gmina: Strzyżów
- Population: 640

Glinik Zaborowski [ˈɡlʲiɲik zabɔˈrɔfskʲi] is a village in the administrative district of Gmina Strzyżów, within Strzyżów County, Subcarpathian Voivodeship, in south-eastern Poland.
