= Gmina Frysztak =

Gmina Frysztak Frysztak Commune
- Gmina
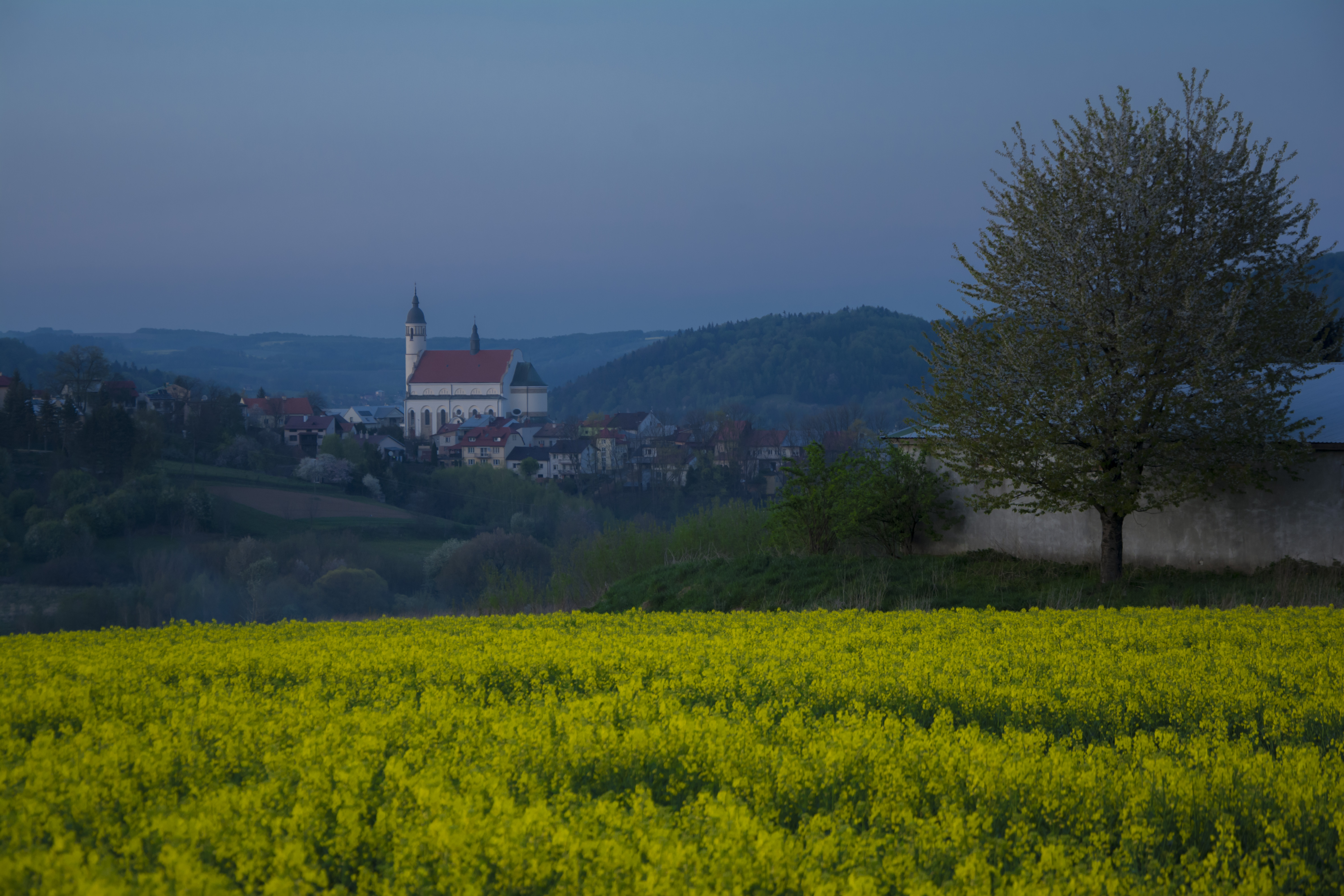
- View of Frystak

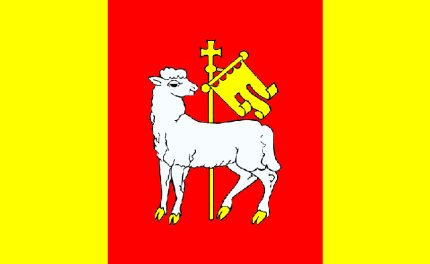
- Flag Coat of arms
- Interactive map of Gmina Frysztak
- Coordinates (Frysztak): 49°50′N 21°37′E
- Country: Poland
- Voivodeship: Subcarpathian
- County: Strzyżów
- Seat: Frysztak

Area
  - Total: 90.51 km^{2} (34.95 sq mi)

Population (2006)
  - Total: 10,635
  - Density: 117.5/km^{2} (304.3/sq mi)
- Website: http://www.frysztak.pl

Gmina Frysztak is a rural gmina (administrative district) in Strzyżów County, Subcarpathian Voivodeship, in south-eastern Poland. Its seat is the village of Frysztak, which lies approximately 14 kilometres (9 mi) south-west of Strzyżów and 36 km (22 mi) south-west of the regional capital Rzeszów.

The gmina covers an area of 90.51 square kilometres (34.9 sq mi), and as of 2006 its total population is 10,635.

The gmina contains part of the protected area called Czarnorzeki-Strzyżów Landscape Park.

== Villages ==
Gmina Frysztak contains the villages and settlements of Chytrówka, Cieszyna, Frysztak, Glinik Dolny, Glinik Górny, Glinik Średni, Gogołów, Huta Gogołowska, Kobyle, Lubla, Pułanki, Stępina, Twierdza and Widacz.

== Neighbouring gminas ==
Gmina Frysztak is bordered by the gminas of Brzostek, Jasło, Kołaczyce, Wielopole Skrzyńskie, Wiśniowa and Wojaszówka.
