= Kożuchów, Podkarpackie Voivodeship =

Kożuchów
- Village
- Location within Poland
- Coordinates: 49°52′30″N 21°41′44″E
- Country: Poland
- Voivodeship: Subcarpathian
- County: Strzyżów
- Gmina: Wiśniowa

Kożuchów [kɔˈʐuxuf] is a village in the administrative district of Gmina Wiśniowa, within Strzyżów County, Subcarpathian Voivodeship, in south-eastern Poland.
