= Jazowa, Podkarpackie Voivodeship =

Jazowa
- Village
- Location within Poland
- Coordinates: 49°51′30″N 21°39′27″E
- Country: Poland
- Voivodeship: Subcarpathian
- County: Strzyżów
- Gmina: Wiśniowa

Jazowa [jaˈzɔva] is a village in the administrative district of Gmina Wiśniowa, within Strzyżów County, Subcarpathian Voivodeship, in south-eastern Poland.
