= Jaszczurowa, Podkarpackie Voivodeship =

Jaszczurowa
- Village
- Location within Poland
- Coordinates: 49°54′30″N 21°33′55″E
- Country: Poland
- Voivodeship: Subcarpathian
- County: Strzyżów
- Gmina: Wiśniowa

Jaszczurowa [jaʂt͡ʂuˈrɔva] is a village in the administrative district of Gmina Wiśniowa, within Strzyżów County, Subcarpathian Voivodeship, in south-eastern Poland.
