= Godowa =

- Village
- Location within Poland
- Coordinates: 49°51′8″N 21°47′55″E
- Country: Poland
- Voivodeship: Subcarpathian
- County: Strzyżów
- Gmina: Strzyżów
- Population: 2,100
- Website: http://www.godowa.ocom.pl

Godowa [ɡɔˈdɔva] is a village in the administrative district of Gmina Strzyżów, within Strzyżów County, Subcarpathian Voivodeship, in south-eastern Poland.
