= Jawornik, Strzyżów County =

Jawornik
- Village
- Location within Poland
- Coordinates: 49°50′46″N 21°53′36″E
- Country: Poland
- Voivodeship: Subcarpathian
- County: Strzyżów
- Gmina: Niebylec
- Population: 1,200

Jawornik [jaˈvɔrɲik] is a village in the administrative district of Gmina Niebylec, within Strzyżów County, Subcarpathian Voivodeship, in south-eastern Poland.
