= Babica, Podkarpackie Voivodeship =

Babica
- Village
- Location within Poland
- Coordinates: 49°56′7″N 21°53′59″E
- Country: Poland
- Voivodeship: Subcarpathian
- County: Strzyżów
- Gmina: Czudec
- Population: 1,200

Babica [baˈbʲit͡sa] is a village in the administrative district of Gmina Czudec, within Strzyżów County, Subcarpathian Voivodeship, in south-eastern Poland.

The village had a population of 1,200 as of a 2008 census.
