= Kalembina =

- Village
- Location within Poland
- Coordinates: 49°52′N 21°40′E
- Country: Poland
- Voivodeship: Subcarpathian
- County: Strzyżów
- Gmina: Wiśniowa

Kalembina [kalɛmˈbʲina] is a village in the administrative district of Gmina Wiśniowa, within Strzyżów County, Subcarpathian Voivodeship, in south-eastern Poland.
