= Szufnarowa =

- Village
- Location within Poland
- Coordinates: 49°55′N 21°38′E
- Country: Poland
- Voivodeship: Subcarpathian
- County: Strzyżów
- Gmina: Wiśniowa
- Time zone: UTC+1 (CET)
  - Summer (DST): UTC+2 (CEST)
- Vehicle registration: RSR
- Website: http://www.szufnarowa.cba.pl

Szufnarowa [ʂufnaˈrɔva] is a village in the administrative district of Gmina Wiśniowa, within Strzyżów County, Subcarpathian Voivodeship, in south-eastern Poland.

Four Polish citizens were murdered by Nazi Germany in the village during World War II.

It is the place of birth of the 80's pop singer and starlette Danuta Lato.
