= Gbiska =

- Village
- Location within Poland
- Coordinates: 49°51′49″N 21°45′42″E
- Country: Poland
- Voivodeship: Podkarpackie
- County: Strzyżów
- Gmina: Strzyżów

Gbiska [ˈɡbʲiska] is a village in the administrative district of Gmina Strzyżów, within Strzyżów County, Podkarpackie Voivodeship, in south-eastern Poland.
