= Lubla =

- Village
- Location within Poland
- Coordinates: 49°49′N 21°35′E
- Country: Poland
- Voivodeship: Subcarpathian
- County: Strzyżów
- Gmina: Frysztak

Lubla [ˈlubla] is a village in the administrative district of Gmina Frysztak, within Strzyżów County, Subcarpathian Voivodeship, in south-eastern Poland.

== History ==
Lubla belonged to the early settlements in Podkarpacie. "The manor house in Lubla and the village were owned by the Cistercian order from 1185. Originally, it was administered by a religious brother (layman), later by lay administrators and tenants, as mentioned in the visit reports of Kraków bishops. After the first partition, the Austrian government confiscated the manor and the village for the benefit of the state treasury".

There is an entry in the foundation privilege of the prince of Kraków, Kazimierz the Righteous, in which Lubla is listed as a donation given by Count Mikołaj of Bogoria to the Cistercian order in Koprzywnica. the salary of the Cistercian monastery in Koprzywnica. In 1279, the papal legate, Bishop of Firm Filip, in Buda, Hungary, confirmed to the abbot of the Cistercian monastery in Koprzywnica the right to receive tithes from, among others, Dobrzechów, Lubla, Zaborów, Czudec and Strzyżów. Throughout history, it was approved by Polish princes and kings as the property of the Cistercians.

In the years 1732–1734, the parish priest in Lubli was Fr. Antoni Duchnowski, later canon of Livonia and Tarnów.

In 1780, the Austrian Emperor Joseph II, after the confiscation of the Cistercian order, incorporated the village and the manor into the imperial estates.

In 1808, the Austrian government sold the village and the farm to private hands at an auction. Jan Brzciciel Rogoyski, Brochwicz coat of arms, and on 7 June 1867, it was bought by Ludwin Dzianott with his wife Izabela from Czechs (primo voto Lisowiecka).
