= Gmina Czudec =

Gmina Czudec Czudec Commune
- Gmina
- Coat of arms
- Interactive map of Gmina Czudec
- Coordinates (Czudec): 49°56′44″N 21°50′17″E
- Country: Poland
- Voivodeship: Subcarpathian
- County: Strzyżów
- Seat: Czudec

Area
  - Total: 84.96 km^{2} (32.80 sq mi)

Population (2006)
  - Total: 11,561
  - Density: 136.1/km^{2} (352.4/sq mi)
- Website: http://www.czudec.pl/

Gmina Czudec is a rural gmina (administrative district) in Strzyżów County, Subcarpathian Voivodeship, in south-eastern Poland. Its seat is the village of Czudec, which lies approximately 8 kilometres (5 mi) north-east of Strzyżów and 16 km (10 mi) south-west of the regional capital Rzeszów.

The gmina covers an area of 84.96 square kilometres (32.8 sq mi), and as of 2006 its total population is 11,561.

== Villages ==
Gmina Czudec contains the villages and settlements of Babica, Czudec, Nowa Wieś, Przedmieście Czudeckie, Pstrągowa, Wyżne and Zaborów.

== Neighbouring gminas ==
Gmina Czudec is bordered by the gminas of Boguchwała, Iwierzyce, Lubenia, Niebylec, Strzyżów and Wielopole Skrzyńskie.
