= Pstrągowa =

- Village
- Location within Poland
- Coordinates: 49°56′3″N 21°45′43″E
- Country: Poland
- Voivodeship: Subcarpathian
- County: Strzyżów
- Gmina: Czudec
- Population: 1,900

Pstrągowa [pstrɔŋˈɡɔva] is a village in the administrative district of Gmina Czudec, within Strzyżów County, Subcarpathian Voivodeship, in south-eastern Poland.
