= Grodzisko, Podkarpackie Voivodeship =

Grodzisko
- Village
- Location within Poland
- Coordinates: 49°55′N 21°43′E
- Country: Poland
- Voivodeship: Subcarpathian
- County: Strzyżów
- Gmina: Strzyżów

Grodzisko [ɡrɔˈd͡ʑiskɔ] is a village in the administrative district of Gmina Strzyżów, within Strzyżów County, Subcarpathian Voivodeship, in south-eastern Poland.
