= Gwoździanka =

- Village
- Location within Poland
- Coordinates: 49°53′N 21°54′E
- Country: Poland
- Voivodeship: Subcarpathian
- County: Strzyżów
- Gmina: Niebylec

Gwoździanka [ɡvɔʑˈd͡ʑaŋka] is a village in the administrative district of Gmina Niebylec, within Strzyżów County, Subcarpathian Voivodeship, in south-eastern Poland.
