= Huta Gogołowska =

- Village
- Location within Poland
- Coordinates: 49°53′N 21°32′E
- Country: Poland
- Voivodeship: Subcarpathian
- County: Strzyżów
- Gmina: Frysztak
- Population: 225

Huta Gogołowska [ˈxuta ɡɔɡɔˈwɔfska] is a village in the administrative district of Gmina Frysztak, within Strzyżów County, Subcarpathian Voivodeship, in south-eastern Poland.
