= Markuszowa =

- Village
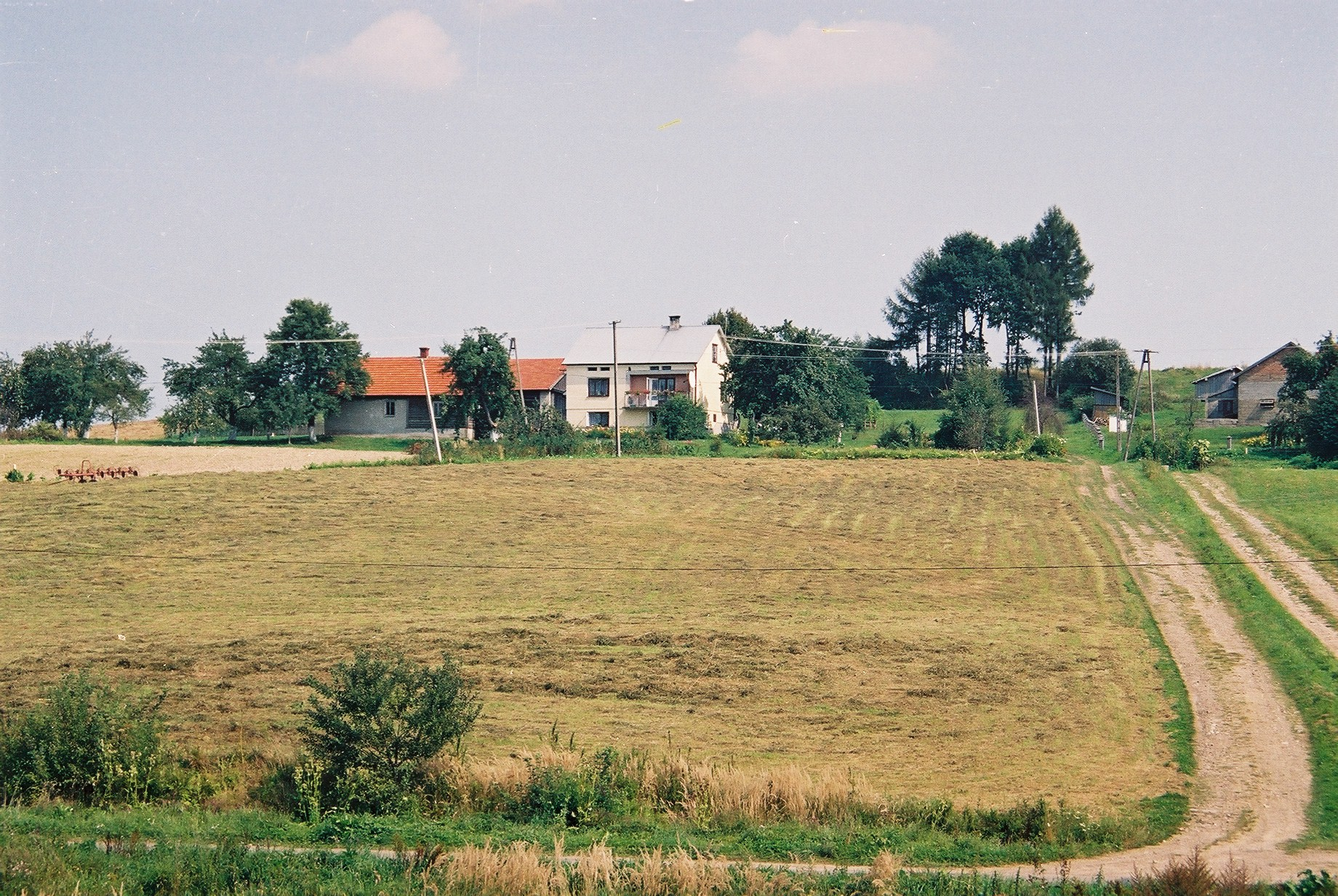

- Location within Poland
- Coordinates: 49°51′N 21°42′E
- Country: Poland
- Voivodeship: Subcarpathian
- County: Strzyżów
- Gmina: Wiśniowa
- Time zone: UTC+1 (CET)
  - Summer (DST): UTC+2 (CEST)
- Vehicle registration: RSR

Markuszowa [markuˈʂɔva] is a village in the administrative district of Gmina Wiśniowa, within Strzyżów County, Subcarpathian Voivodeship, in south-eastern Poland.

== History ==
Following the joint German-Soviet invasion of Poland, which started World War II in September 1939, the village was occupied by Germany. In June 1943, the German gendarmerie carried out a massacre of five Poles, four farmers and one officer, as punishment for aiding Jews.
