= Glinik Średni =

- Village
- Location within Poland
- Coordinates: 49°50′N 21°34′E
- Country: Poland
- Voivodeship: Subcarpathian
- County: Strzyżów
- Gmina: Frysztak

Glinik Średni [ˈɡlʲiɲik ˈɕrɛdɲi] is a village in the administrative district of Gmina Frysztak, within Strzyżów County, Subcarpathian Voivodeship, in south-eastern Poland.
