= Glinik Charzewski =

- Village
- Location within Poland
- Coordinates: 49°55′N 21°50′E
- Country: Poland
- Voivodeship: Subcarpathian
- County: Strzyżów
- Gmina: Strzyżów

Glinik Charzewski [ˈɡlʲiɲik xaˈʐɛfskʲi] is a village in the administrative district of Gmina Strzyżów in Strzyżów County, Subcarpathian Voivodeship, located in south-eastern Poland.
