= Niebylec, Podkarpackie Voivodeship =

Niebylec
- Village
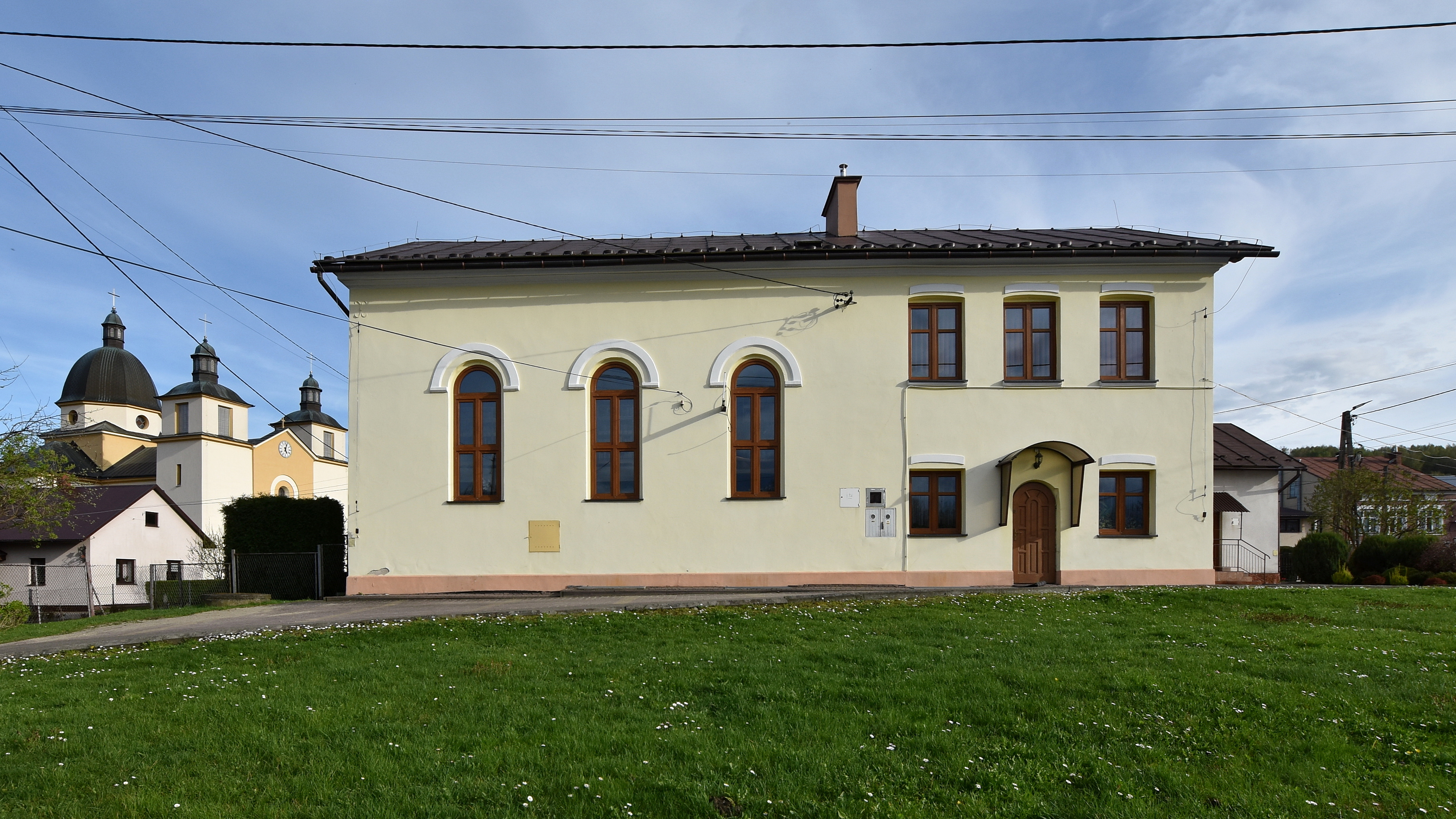
- Former synagogue, now a library, and the Church of the Finding of the Holy Cross to the left

- Location within Poland
- Coordinates: 49°51′N 21°54′E
- Country: Poland
- Voivodeship: Subcarpathian
- County: Strzyżów
- Gmina: Niebylec

Population
  - Total: 594

Niebylec [ɲɛˈbɨlɛt͡s] is a village in Strzyżów County, Subcarpathian Voivodeship, in south-eastern Poland. It is the seat of the gmina (administrative district) called Gmina Niebylec. Niebylec lies in eastern part of historic Lesser Poland, approximately 10 km (6 mi) south-east of Strzyżów and 22 km (14 mi) south of the regional capital Rzeszów. The village is located along National Road Nr. 9, which also makes Polish part of the European route E371. Niebylec, even though a village now, used to be a town from 1509 until 1919.

In the 15th and 16th centuries, the village, known at that time as Jawornik, belonged to the noble Machowski family (Abdank coat of arms). Jawornik received Magdeburg rights in 1509, due to efforts of Mikolaj Machowski of Machow. The town was part of Lesser Poland's Sandomierz Voivodeship, remaining a small location in the eastern outskirts of the province, close to the border with Red Ruthenia. In 1646, a new Roman Catholic church was built here by Niebylec's new owner, Janusz Romer. In the late 17th and the 18th centuries, the town belonged to several families. Niebylec was one of the centers of the Bar Confederation, and in 1772 (see Partitions of Poland), it was annexed by the Habsburg Empire, as part of Galicia. In the 19th century, the number of Jews grew in Niebylec, and by the early 20th century, they made the majority of the population. Niebylec lost its charter in 1919, as it was too small to remain a town.

During World War II, Jewish population was decimated in the Holocaust. The area of the village was a stronghold of the Home Army (AK), as part of AK's Rzeszow- South Inspectorate.

Niebylec has a parish church, built in 1936–1943 on the spot of the location of the 1646 church. In the village there also is a synagogue (second half of the 19th century), which now houses a library. Furthermore, the village has a 15th-century manor house, rebuilt in the 18th and 19th centuries, and a late 18th-century roadside chapel.

In September 2019 Niebylec declared itself an "LGBT-free zone."
