= Konieczkowa =

- Village
- Location within Poland
- Coordinates: 49°51′N 21°56′E
- Country: Poland
- Voivodeship: Subcarpathian
- County: Strzyżów
- Gmina: Niebylec
- Population: 1,500

Konieczkowa [kɔɲɛt͡ʂˈkɔva] is a village in the administrative district of Gmina Niebylec, within Strzyżów County, Subcarpathian Voivodeship, in south-eastern Poland.
