= Kozłówek, Podkarpackie Voivodeship =

Kozłówek
- Village
- Location within Poland
- Coordinates: 49°51′27″N 21°41′0″E
- Country: Poland
- Voivodeship: Subcarpathian
- County: Strzyżów
- Gmina: Wiśniowa

Kozłówek [kɔˈzwuvɛk] is a village in the administrative district of Gmina Wiśniowa, within Strzyżów County, Subcarpathian Voivodeship, in south-eastern Poland.
