= Top of the Line =

Top of the Line may refer to:

- Top of the Line (Rittz album), 2016
- Top of the Line (Tito El Bambino album), 2006
- Top of the Line, album by Prince Phillip Mitchell, 1979
- Top of the Line, album by Patty Ryan, 1988
- "Top of the Line", song by Frankie J from Priceless, 2006
