= Chytrówka =

- Village
- Location within Poland
- Coordinates: 49°53′16″N 21°34′46″E
- Country: Poland
- Voivodeship: Subcarpathian
- County: Strzyżów
- Gmina: Frysztak

Chytrówka [xɨˈtrufka] is a village in the administrative district of Gmina Frysztak, within Strzyżów County, Subcarpathian Voivodeship, in south-eastern Poland.
