= Widacz, Strzyżów County =

Widacz
- Village
- Location within Poland
- Coordinates: 49°48′38″N 21°37′48″E
- Country: Poland
- Voivodeship: Subcarpathian
- County: Strzyżów
- Gmina: Frysztak
- Population: 230

Widacz [ˈvʲidat͡ʂ] is a village in the administrative district of Gmina Frysztak, within Strzyżów County, Subcarpathian Voivodeship, in south-eastern Poland.
