= Przedmieście Czudeckie =

- Village
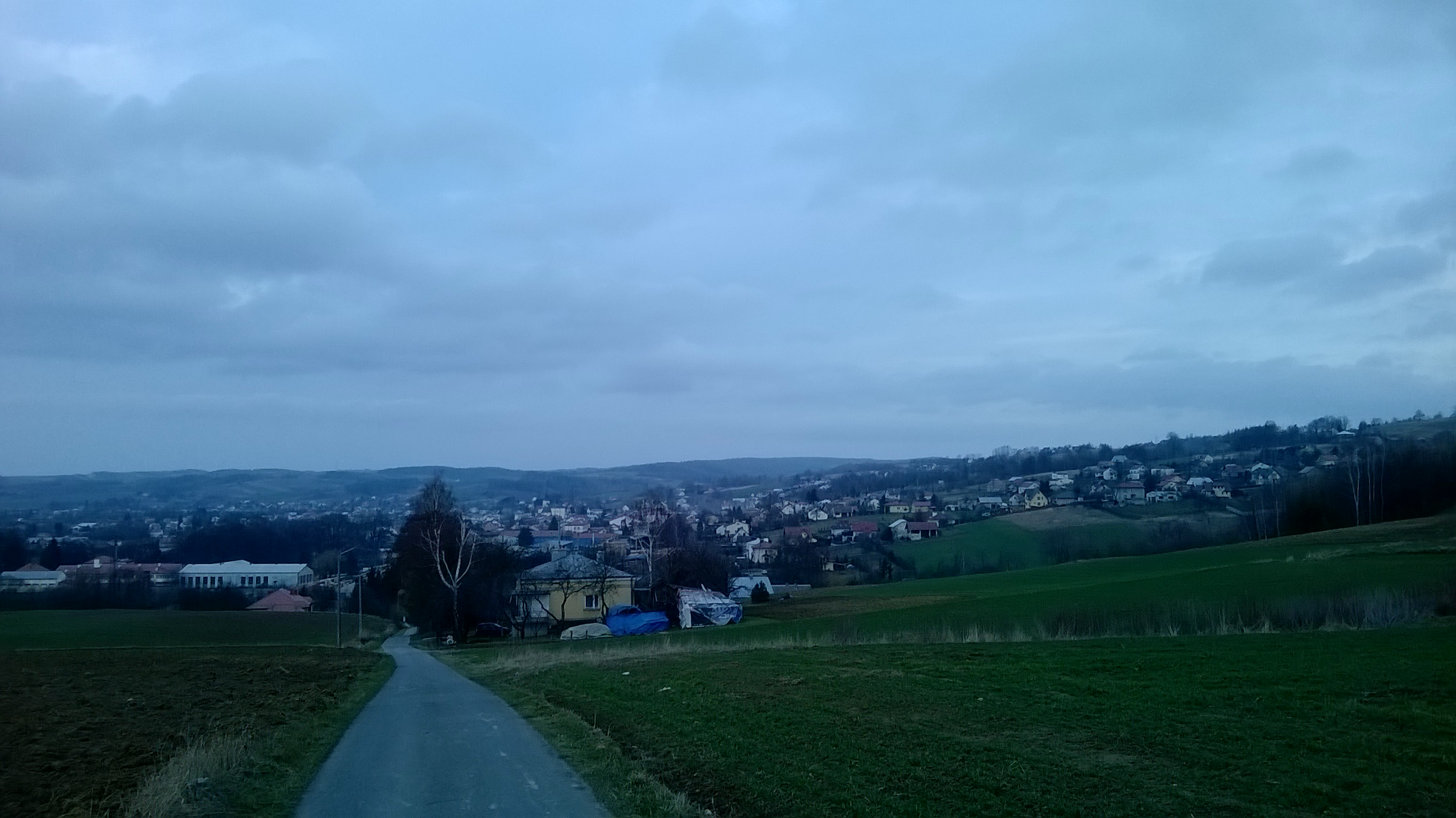

- Location within Poland
- Coordinates: 49°57′51″N 21°49′25″E
- Country: Poland
- Voivodeship: Subcarpathian
- County: Strzyżów
- Gmina: Czudec

Population
  - Total: 1,700
- Time zone: UTC+1 (CET)
  - Summer (DST): UTC+2 (CEST)
- Vehicle registration: RSR

Przedmieście Czudeckie [pʂɛdˈmʲɛɕt͡ɕɛ t͡ʂuˈdɛt͡skʲɛ] is a village in the administrative district of Gmina Czudec, within Strzyżów County, Subcarpathian Voivodeship, in south-eastern Poland.

Four Polish citizens were murdered by Nazi Germany in the village during World War II.
