= Gmina Niebylec =

Gmina Niebylec Niebylec Commune
- Gmina
- Coat of arms
- Interactive map of Gmina Niebylec
- Coordinates (Niebylec): 49°51′N 21°54′E
- Country: Poland
- Voivodeship: Subcarpathian
- County: Strzyżów
- Seat: Niebylec

Area
  - Total: 104.37 km^{2} (40.30 sq mi)

Population (2006)
  - Total: 10,606
  - Density: 101.62/km^{2} (263.19/sq mi)
- Website: http://www.niebylec.pl

Gmina Niebylec is a rural gmina (administrative district) in Strzyżów County, Subcarpathian Voivodeship, in south-eastern Poland. Its seat is the village of Niebylec, which lies approximately 10 kilometres (6 mi) south-east of Strzyżów and 22 km (14 mi) south of the regional capital Rzeszów.

The gmina covers an area of 104.37 square kilometres (40.3 sq mi), and as of 2006 its total population is 10,606.

== Villages ==
Gmina Niebylec contains the villages and settlements of Baryczka, Blizianka, Gwoździanka, Gwoźnica Dolna, Gwoźnica Górna, Jawornik, Konieczkowa, Lutcza, Małówka, Niebylec and Połomia.

== Neighbouring gminas ==
Gmina Niebylec is bordered by the gminas of Błażowa, Czudec, Domaradz, Korczyna, Lubenia and Strzyżów.
