= Połomia, Strzyżów County =

Połomia
- Village
- Location within Poland
- Coordinates: 49°53′53″N 21°52′52″E
- Country: Poland
- Voivodeship: Subcarpathian
- County: Strzyżów
- Gmina: Niebylec
- Population: 1,800

Połomia [pɔˈwɔmʲa] is a village in the administrative district of Gmina Niebylec, within Strzyżów County, Subcarpathian Voivodeship, in south-eastern Poland.
