= Tadeusz Lutak =

Polish soldier and resistance member (1917–2026)

- Lutak as a young man
- Born: 29 August 1917; Żarnowa, Kingdom of Galicia and Lodomeria
- Died: 5 October 2026 (aged 109); Strzyżów, Poland
- Military career
- Allegiance: Poland
- Branch: Polish Armed Forces; Home Army
- Rank: Captain
- Units: 2nd Armoured Battalion; 121st Light Tank Company; Rzeszów Inspectorate of the Home Army
- Conflicts: Invasion of Poland

Tadeusz Władysław Lutak (29 August 1917 – 5 October 2026), nom de guerre "Pancerz", was a Polish soldier and World War II veteran who participated in the September 1939 campaign and the Polish resistance movement during the invasion of Poland. Before the war he had served in the Polish armoured forces; during the German occupation of Poland, he was a member of the Union of Armed Struggle (ZWZ) and later the Home Army (AK).

== Early life ==
Tadeusz Władysław Lutak was born on 29 August 1917 in Żarnowa, the son of Piotr Lutak and Katarzyna, née Dudek. He was one of nine children, having five sisters and three brothers. His father worked as a railway switchman and his mother managed the family farm.

After completing elementary school, Lutak obtained a journeyman qualification in meat processing. In 1937 he volunteered for military service.

== Military service ==
=== Pre-war service ===
On 25 November 1937, Lutak was assigned to the non-commissioned officers' school of the 2nd Armoured Battalion at Żurawica. He attended the school from 1 February to 30 September 1938. After completing his training, he was assigned to a company equipped with Vickers 6-Ton tanks and served as a motorcycle dispatch rider.

On 1 August 1938 he received a "Good Marksman" distinction, and in September he was promoted to senior rifleman. In the autumn of 1938, he took part in Polish military operations in Zaolzie, Spiš and Orava.

=== September Campaign ===
Following the German invasion of Poland on 1 September 1939, Lutak served as a motorcycle dispatch rider with the 121st Light Tank Company of the 10th Cavalry Brigade, commanded by Colonel Stanisław Maczek.

Lutak took part in fighting near Myślenice and Jordanów as Polish forces withdrew through southern and south-eastern Poland. He was subsequently captured by German forces near Stary Dzików, but escaped from a prisoner transport and returned home.

== Resistance activities ==
During the German occupation, Lutak took employment in order to avoid deportation to Germany for forced labour. He worked on the construction of the German railway shelter at Strzyżów and later worked as a coachman during the early stages of the German–Soviet war.

From 1940, Lutak was active in the underground Union of Armed Struggle, which became the Home Army in 1942. Using the pseudonym "Pancerz", he served in a sabotage group commanded by Stanisław Mikulski, pseudonym "Żmija". He was also connected with the underground centre commanded by Lieutenant Józef Lutak, pseudonym "Orzeł". He served in the intelligence and sabotage organisation codenamed "Ruch", which was subordinate to the Rzeszów Home Army inspector Łukasz Ciepliński. He gathered intelligence and participated in sabotage and diversion activities.

A 2024 study by historian Józef Forystek, drawing on archival Home Army records, also identifies Lutak as a member of Mikulski's sabotage group. In early July 1943, Mikulski's group, including Lutak, joined a Home Army partisan training detachment in the forests near Sołonka. The combined groups conducted military exercises before separating and returning to their respective areas of operation. While working on the railway shelter at Strzyżów, Lutak continued his underground activities. According to the Institute of National Remembrance, he obtained intelligence and was able to acquire some of the explosives used by the Germans during construction for use by the resistance.

In 1944, holding the underground rank of corporal, he became commander of a sabotage squad in the sabotage platoon of the Home Army post at Strzyżów.

== Post-war life ==
Following the arrival of Soviet forces in the region, Lutak left for the former German territories transferred to Poland after World War II, commonly known in Poland as the Recovered Territories. He remained there for about a year before returning to Żarnowa in 1946. He subsequently worked as a butcher and farmer.

After the end of communist rule in Poland, Lutak became active in veterans' organisations, including the World Association of Home Army Soldiers and the Union of Combatants of the Republic of Poland and Former Political Prisoners. His activity in the latter organisation was recognised with its merit badge in 2000.

On 2 January 2001, Lutak was appointed to the rank of second lieutenant. He was later promoted to lieutenant. On 3 March 2023, during a ceremony at the Sokół Cultural Centre in Strzyżów, he was promoted to captain.

== Veterans' and historical activities ==
Lutak participated in historical education and commemorative activities concerning the Home Army and the Polish wartime underground. He cooperated with the Rzeszów branch of the Institute of National Remembrance, including in the organisation of an educational rally following Home Army sites in the Strzyżów area.

He also contributed information and source material to historical works. He assisted Piotr Szopa in preparing Armia Krajowa w Strzyżowskiem, published in 2009, and later contributed to Szopa's W imieniu Rzeczypospolitej... Wymiar sprawiedliwości Polskiego Państwa Podziemnego na terenie Podokręgu AK Rzeszów, published in 2014.

In 2016, Lutak provided soldiers of his former unit at Żurawica with historical photographs relating to the unit's pre-war activities.

== Personal life and death ==
Lutak married Maria in 1943 during the German occupation. The wedding took place at her family home in Żarnowa. The couple had three daughters. After the war they built a house and farmed together, while Lutak also continued to work as a butcher. Tadeusz and Maria Lutak were married for 69 years. Maria died following an illness in 2012. In 2025, Lutak was reported to have ten grandchildren. One of his grandsons, Wojciech Grodecki, collected and edited Lutak's wartime recollections for a book published in 2024.

Lutak reached his centenary on 29 August 2017. On the eve of his 100th birthday, he was presented with the Officer's Cross of the Order of Polonia Restituta, awarded by the President of Poland for his contributions to Polish independence and his veteran and social activities. He also received a congratulatory letter from Prime Minister Beata Szydło marking his centenary. He celebrated his 105th birthday in August 2022, when he was visited by a delegation from the 11th Lubuska Armoured Cavalry Division, which described him as the oldest tank soldier of the Polish Army. On 29 August 2026, Lutak celebrated his 109th birthday. He was visited by the head of the Office for War Veterans and Victims of Oppression, Lech Parell, who presented him with a commemorative sabre. At the time, the office described Lutak as the oldest living soldier of the Polish Army and the oldest living man in Poland.

Lutak died on 5 October 2026, at the age of 109. He was likely succeeded as Poland's oldest living man by 108-year-old Alfons Tomke.

== Memoirs ==
Lutak's wartime recollections were published in the regional monthly magazine Waga i Miecz in 1991 and 1992. A collection of his memoirs was published in 2001 under the title Wojenne losy Strzyżowiaków (English: The wartime fates of the people of Strzyżów).

In 2024, a further selection of his accounts, Tadeusz Lutak ps. "Pancerz": opowieści wojenne, was published. His grandson Wojciech Grodecki collected and edited the accounts, which cover Lutak's pre-war military service, the September Campaign and his wartime underground activities.
