= Pstrągówka =

- Village
- Location within Poland
- Coordinates: 49°53′N 21°37′E
- Country: Poland
- Voivodeship: Subcarpathian
- County: Strzyżów
- Gmina: Wiśniowa
- Population: 600

Pstrągówka [pstrɔŋˈɡufka] is a village in the administrative district of Gmina Wiśniowa, within Strzyżów County, Subcarpathian Voivodeship, in south-eastern Poland.
