= Lutcza =

- Village
- Location within Poland
- Coordinates: 49°48′12″N 21°54′34″E
- Country: Poland
- Voivodeship: Subcarpathian
- County: Strzyżów
- Gmina: Niebylec
- Population: 2,200

Lutcza [ˈlut͡ʂːa] is a village in the administrative district of Gmina Niebylec, within Strzyżów County, Subcarpathian Voivodeship, in south-eastern Poland.
