= Żarnowa =

- Village
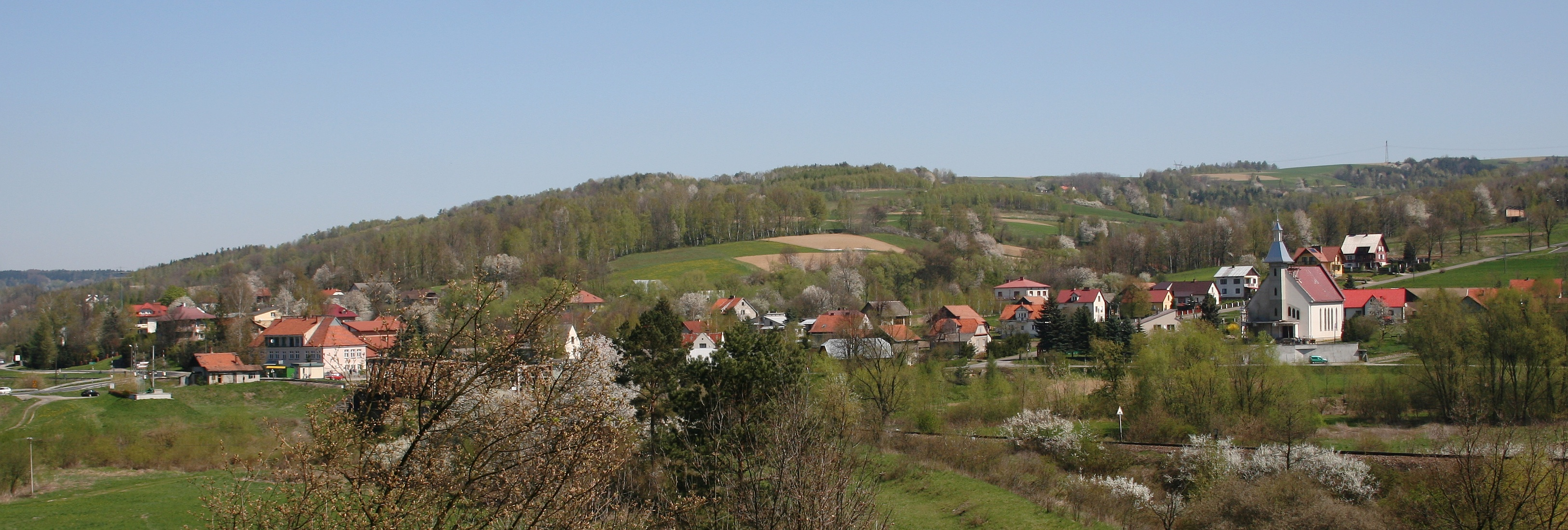

- Location within Poland
- Coordinates: 49°52′28″N 21°49′05″E
- Country: Poland
- Voivodeship: Podkarpackie
- County: Strzyżów
- Gmina: Strzyżów
- Population (approx.): 1,000

Żarnowa [ʐarˈnɔva] is a village in the administrative district of Gmina Strzyżów, within Strzyżów County, Podkarpackie Voivodeship, in south-eastern Poland.
