= Żyznów =

- Village
- Żyznów Palace

- Location within Poland
- Coordinates: 49°49′1″N 21°50′21″E
- Country: Poland
- Voivodeship: Subcarpathian
- County: Strzyżów
- Gmina: Strzyżów
- Time zone: UTC+1 (CET)
  - Summer (DST): UTC+2 (CEST)

Żyznów [ˈʐɨznuf] is a village in the administrative district of Gmina Strzyżów, within Strzyżów County, Subcarpathian Voivodeship, in south-eastern Poland.

Five Polish citizens were murdered by Nazi Germany in the village during World War II.
