= Patty Ryan =

German singer (1961–2023)

- Also known as: Susi
- Born: Birgit Hartmann; 6 May 1961; Wuppertal, North Rhine-Westphalia, West Germany
- Died: 23 July 2023 (aged 62) Barmen, Wuppertal, North Rhine-Westphalia, Germany
- Genres: Euro disco, Europop, Eurodance
- Occupations: Singer, songwriter
- Instruments: Vocals
- Years active: 1981–2023; 2005–2006 (songwriter)
- Label: Otre-Media
- Website: pattyryan.eu

Patty Ryan (6 May 1961 – 23 July 2023, born Birgit Hartmann) was a German singer-songwriter best known for her Eurodisco song "You're My Love, You're My Life" from 1986. She also sang the hits "Stay With Me Tonight", "Love is the Name of the Game", and "I Don't Wanna Lose You Tonight" (all from her debut album Love is the Name of the Game). Her style is similar to that of bands like Modern Talking, London Boys, and Bad Boys Blue. Some of the songs from her debut album resemble Modern Talking songs considerably, You're My Love, You're My Life (You're My Heart, You're My Soul), I'm Feeling So Blue (There's Too Much Blue In Missing You), and the song Chinese Eyes even is based around melodies from "You're My Heart, You're My Soul". She also sang Danuta Lato's hit "Touch My Heart".

Ryan had her start in music business with the rockabilly formation Susi & die Rockets, which also participated in the ZDF-Hitparade in 1981 with the song Dieses Haus ist kein Bahnhof (German version of Sweet Lolita from the British rockabilly band Matchbox).

Patty Ryan's later releases included the 2005 CD single "I Gave You All My Love", the 2006 compilation All the Best (Otre-Media), the hits "Ohne Zweifel" (2004), and "Lass mir doch mal meinen Spass" (2005) in Germany.

In May 2022, Patty was diagnosed with lung cancer. Patty Ryan died on 23 July 2023, at the age of 62.

== Discography ==
- Love Is the Name of the Game (1987)
- Top of the Line (1988)
- Lay Love On You (2003)
- All the Best (2006)
