= Gwoźnica Dolna =

- Village
- Location within Poland
- Coordinates: 49°50′15″N 21°57′17″E
- Country: Poland
- Voivodeship: Podkarpackie
- County: Strzyżów
- Gmina: Niebylec

Gwoźnica Dolna [ɡvɔʑˈɲit͡sa ˈdɔlna] is a village in the administrative district of Gmina Niebylec, within Strzyżów County, Podkarpackie Voivodeship, in south-eastern Poland.
