= Frysztak =

- Village
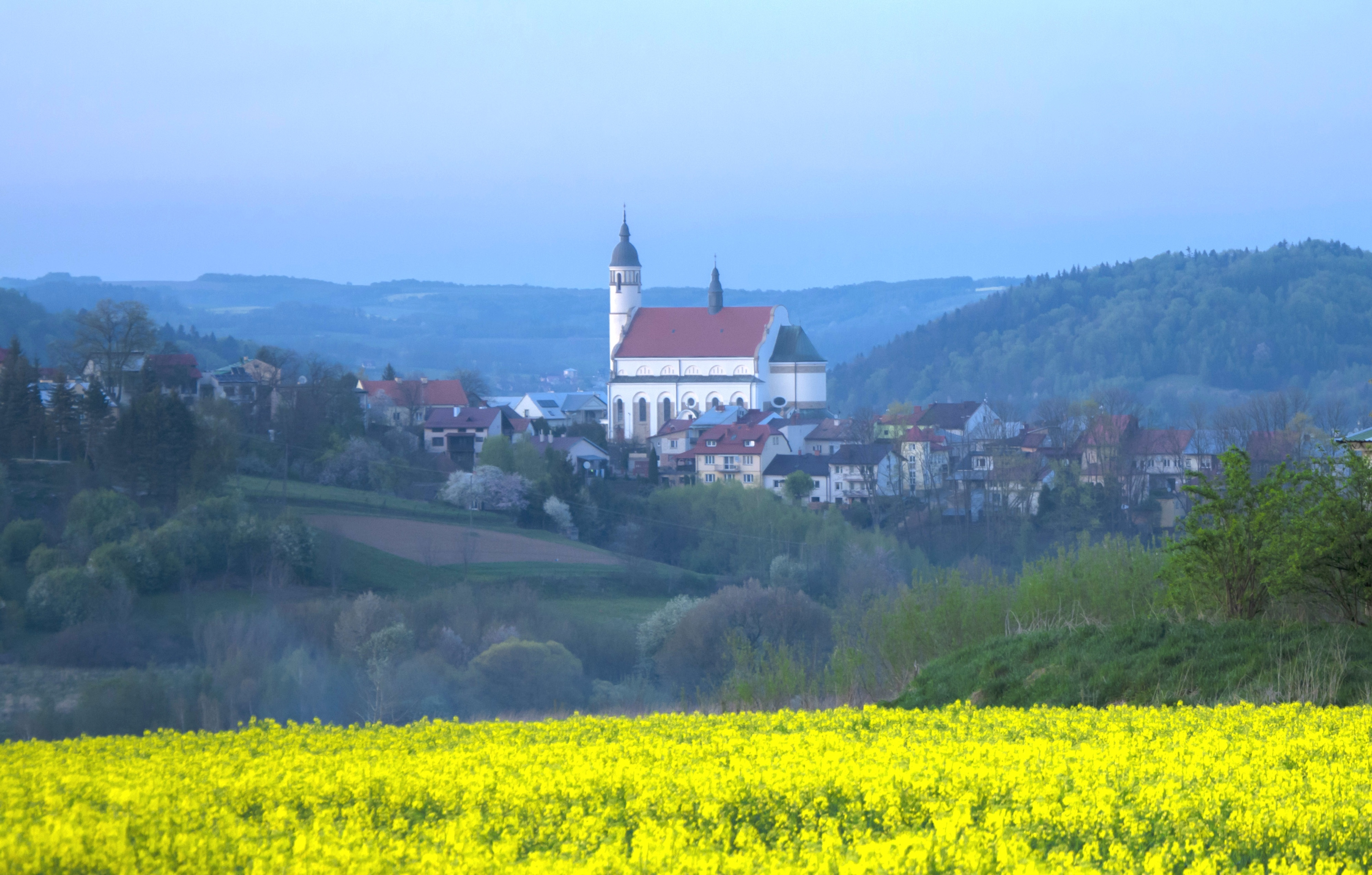
- View of Frysztak

- Location within Poland
- Coordinates: 49°50′N 21°37′E
- Country: Poland
- Voivodeship: Subcarpathian
- County: Strzyżów
- Gmina: Frysztak
- Population: 950
- Time zone: UTC+1 (CET)
  - Summer (DST): UTC+2 (CEST)
- Vehicle registration: RSR
- Website: http://www.frysztak.pl

Frysztak [ˈfrɨʂtak] (Yiddish: פֿריסטיק Fristik; German: Freistadt [ˈfʁaɪʃtat]) is a village in the Gmina Frysztak, Strzyżów County, Subcarpathian Voivodeship, Poland, 17 km (11 mi) from Krosno. Frysztak lies in historic Lesser Poland. It is located on a hillock near the river Wisłok, on the road from Rzeszów to Krosno.

== History ==
Frysztak was mentioned in a 1259 AD document as a town with Magdeburg Rights given by King Bolesław V the Chaste and named Freistadt, literally "Freestead," by the invited German immigrants, though the Polish Internetowa encyklopedia PWN says that Frysztak received city rights (act of city location) in 1366. For centuries, it was a private town, administratively located in the Sandomierz Voivodeship in the Lesser Poland Province.

In 1474, the town was completely destroyed by Hungarian army of King Matthias Corvinus, after which Frysztak declined. Its German-speaking population of the Walddeutsche became Polonized in the course of the time.

The Hasidic leader Rabbi Menachem Mendel of Rimanov (1745–1815) lived and worked there for many years. In 1772, it was annexed by Austria in the First Partition of Poland and included within its newly formed province of Galicia. Following World War I, Poland regained independence and control of the town. Frysztak was stripped of its town charter due to population decline in 1932. Its residents twice tried to change this decision (in 1952 and 1975), but without success.

Following the joint German-Soviet invasion of Poland, which started World War II in September 1939, it was occupied by Germany. Its Jewish population was concentrated in the Frysztak Ghetto and eventually murdered during the Holocaust. A preserved remnant of the local Jewish minority is the Old Jewish Cemetery.

== Notable people ==
- Ludwik de Laveaux (1891–1969), brigadier general of the Polish Army
