= Gmina Strzyżów =

Gmina Strzyżów Strzyżów Commune
- Gmina
- Coat of arms
- Interactive map of Gmina Strzyżów
- Coordinates (Strzyżów): 49°53′N 21°47′E
- Country: Poland
- Voivodeship: Subcarpathian
- County: Strzyżów
- Seat: Strzyżów

Area
  - Total: 140.23 km^{2} (54.14 sq mi)

Population (2006)
  - Total: 20,645
  - Density: 147.22/km^{2} (381.30/sq mi)
  - Urban: 8,703
  - Rural: 11,942
- Website: http://www.strzyzow.pl

Gmina Strzyżów is an urban-rural gmina (administrative district) in Strzyżów County, Subcarpathian Voivodeship, in south-eastern Poland. Its seat is the town of Strzyżów, which lies approximately 24 kilometres (15 mi) south-west of the regional capital Rzeszów.

The gmina covers an area of 140.23 square kilometres (54.1 sq mi), and as of 2006 its total population is 20,645 (out of which the population of Strzyżów amounts to 8,703, and the population of the rural part of the gmina is 11,942).

The gmina contains part of the protected area called Czarnorzeki-Strzyżów Landscape Park.

== Villages ==
Apart from the town of Strzyżów, Gmina Strzyżów contains the villages and settlements of Bonarówka, Brzeżanka, Dobrzechów, Gbiska, Glinik Charzewski, Glinik Zaborowski, Godowa, Grodzisko, Łętownia, Tropie, Wysoka Strzyżowska, Żarnowa, Zawadka and Żyznów.

== Neighbouring gminas ==
Gmina Strzyżów is bordered by the gminas of Czudec, Korczyna, Niebylec, Wielopole Skrzyńskie, Wiśniowa and Wojaszówka.
