= Brzeżanka =

- Village
- Location within Poland
- Coordinates: 49°50′40″N 21°46′0″E
- Country: Poland
- Voivodeship: Subcarpathian
- County: Strzyżów
- Gmina: Strzyżów

Brzeżanka [bʐɛˈʐaŋka] is a village in the administrative district of Gmina Strzyżów, within Strzyżów County, Subcarpathian Voivodeship, in south-eastern Poland.
