= Gwoźnica Górna =

- Village
- Location within Poland
- Coordinates: 49°49′N 21°59′E
- Country: Poland
- Voivodeship: Subcarpathian
- County: Strzyżów
- Gmina: Niebylec
- Elevation: 510 m (1,670 ft)
- Population: 1,480

Gwoźnica Górna [ɡvɔʑˈɲit͡sa ˈɡurna] is a village in the administrative district of Gmina Niebylec, within Strzyżów County, Subcarpathian Voivodeship, in south-eastern Poland.

Polish writer Julian Przyboś was born here.
