= Zwrotnica =

Literary magazine in Poland (1922–1927)

- Categories: Literary magazine
- Founder: Tadeusz Peiper
- Founded: 1922
- First issue: May 1922
- Final issue: 1927
- Country: Poland
- Based in: Kraków
- Language: Polish

Zwrotnica (Polish pronunciation: [zvrɔtˈɲi.t͡sa], Polish: The Switch) was an avant-garde magazine which was one of the significant publications in Poland. It appeared in Kraków in two periods: first between 1922 and 1923, and then between 1926 and 1927. Despite its short run, it is the first Polish avant-garde magazine that had an international audience.

== History and profile ==
Zwrotnica was established by Tadeusz Peiper in Kraków in 1922, and its first issue appeared in May that year. After being published for one year, it ceased publication. Peiper was the editor-in-chief of Zwrotnica between its start in 1922 and its closure in October 1923. The magazine was restarted in 1926 and was permanently closed down in 1927.

Zwrotnica first adopted a futurist approach, but the magazine abandoned it in its second period between 1926 and 1927. Later, the magazine became an avant-garde publication which was the major platform for a Polish group of avant-garde artists from Kraków called Awangarda Krakowska. One of them was Julian Przyboś who published both poems and prose in the second phase of the publication from 1926 to 1927. The other notable contributors of the magazine included Jan Brzękowski and Jalu Kurek. In addition, the writings of the Italian poet Filippo Tommaso Marinetti were featured in the magazine.

Zwrotnica was also an advocate of constructivism, and Henryk Stażewski, a Polish constructivist painter, collaborated with the magazine. Kazimierz Podsadecki became the typographic editor of Zwrotnica in 1926.

Tadeusz Peiper developed a literary program of Zwrotnica which was shared by other avant-garde groups in Europe. It was based on the view that the nature of history was linear. It also emphasized the necessity of technological and scientific developments as well as social utopia. In addition, Zwrotnica managed to be part of the European network of avant‐garde publications which shared articles and other work.
