= Gmina Wiśniowa, Podkarpackie Voivodeship =

Gmina Wiśniowa Wiśniowa Commune
- Gmina
- Coat of arms
- Interactive map of Gmina Wiśniowa
- Coordinates (Wiśniowa): 49°52′N 21°38′E
- Country: Poland
- Voivodeship: Subcarpathian
- County: Strzyżów
- Seat: Wiśniowa

Area
  - Total: 82 km^{2} (32 sq mi)

Population (2006)
  - Total: 8,491
  - Density: 100/km^{2} (270/sq mi)
- Website: http://www.wisniowa.pl

Gmina Wiśniowa is a rural gmina (administrative district) in Strzyżów County, Subcarpathian Voivodeship, in south-eastern Poland. Its seat is the village of Wiśniowa, which lies approximately 11 kilometres (7 mi) west of Strzyżów and 33 km (21 mi) south-west of the regional capital Rzeszów.

The gmina covers an area of 83.29 square kilometres (32.2 sq mi), and as of 2006 its total population is 8,491.

The gmina contains part of the protected area called Czarnorzeki-Strzyżów Landscape Park.

== Villages ==
Gmina Wiśniowa contains the villages and settlements of Jaszczurowa, Jazowa, Kalembina, Kozłówek, Kożuchów, Markuszowa, Niewodna, Oparówka, Pstrągówka, Różanka, Szufnarowa, Tułkowice and Wiśniowa.

== Neighbouring gminas ==
Gmina Wiśniowa is bordered by the gminas of Frysztak, Strzyżów, Wielopole Skrzyńskie and Wojaszówka.
