= Danuta Lato =

Polish model

- Born: Danuta Irzyk; 25 November 1963 (age 62); Szufnarowa, Polish People's Republic (now Poland)
- Other names: Danuta; Danuta Duvall
- Occupations: Glamour model; actress; singer
- Height: 4 ft 11 in (1.50 m)

Danuta Lato (born Danuta Irzyk; 25 November 1963) is a Polish glamour model, actress and later singer.

== Career ==
Lato was born Danuta Irzyk on 25 November 1963 (some sources give 1965) in the small village of Szufnarowa in Gmina Wiśniowa, Podkarpackie Voivodeship where she later worked as a kindergarten teacher. She married and divorced her first husband at the age of 20 after only a week's marriage. It was the first divorce ever in the village. Some sources claim her daughter Laura is from that weeklong marriage.

Lato moved to West Germany in 1984 to pursue a modeling and film career, including a recurring role in Yehuda Barkan's series of Hidden Camera films.

Throughout the late 1980s into the 1990s she pursued a music career. As a singer, she had moderate success in Europe with her single "Touch My Heart". Her other songs were syndicated across European Italo disco compilation CDs from the 1980s–1990s, such as Hot Girls.

Although not officially retired, she has not been in public since 1994.

== Discography ==
Singles

- 1987 – "Touch My Heart" / "I Need You" (ZYX)
- 1989 – "Whenever You Go" / "Nobody's Woman" (ZYX)

Compilation

- 1989 – Hot Girls (with Samantha Fox and Sabrina) (Perfil)

== Filmography ==
Year	Title	Role	Other notes
1985	Drei und eine halbe Portion	Stripper	
1986	Nipagesh Basivuv	Danuta	Israeli prank movie
1986	Total Bescheuert		
1987	Soldier of Fortune		
1987	Nipagesh Bachof	Danuta	Israeli prank movie
1988	Felix	Danuta	
1989	Busen 2 (V)	"Cover Girl"	
1989	With the Next Man Everything Will Be Different	Blonde	
1989	W labiryncie	Barbara	Appeared in season 1's episodes 35 & 38 – 42
1990	Neshika Bametzach	Danuta – Buxom Polish escort	
1990	Das Erbe der Guldenburgs		Appeared in season 3's episode 12
1991	Pommes Rot-Weiß (V)		
1997	A Case for Two		Appeared in season 17's episode 5
