= Julian Przyboś =

Polish writer (1901–1970)

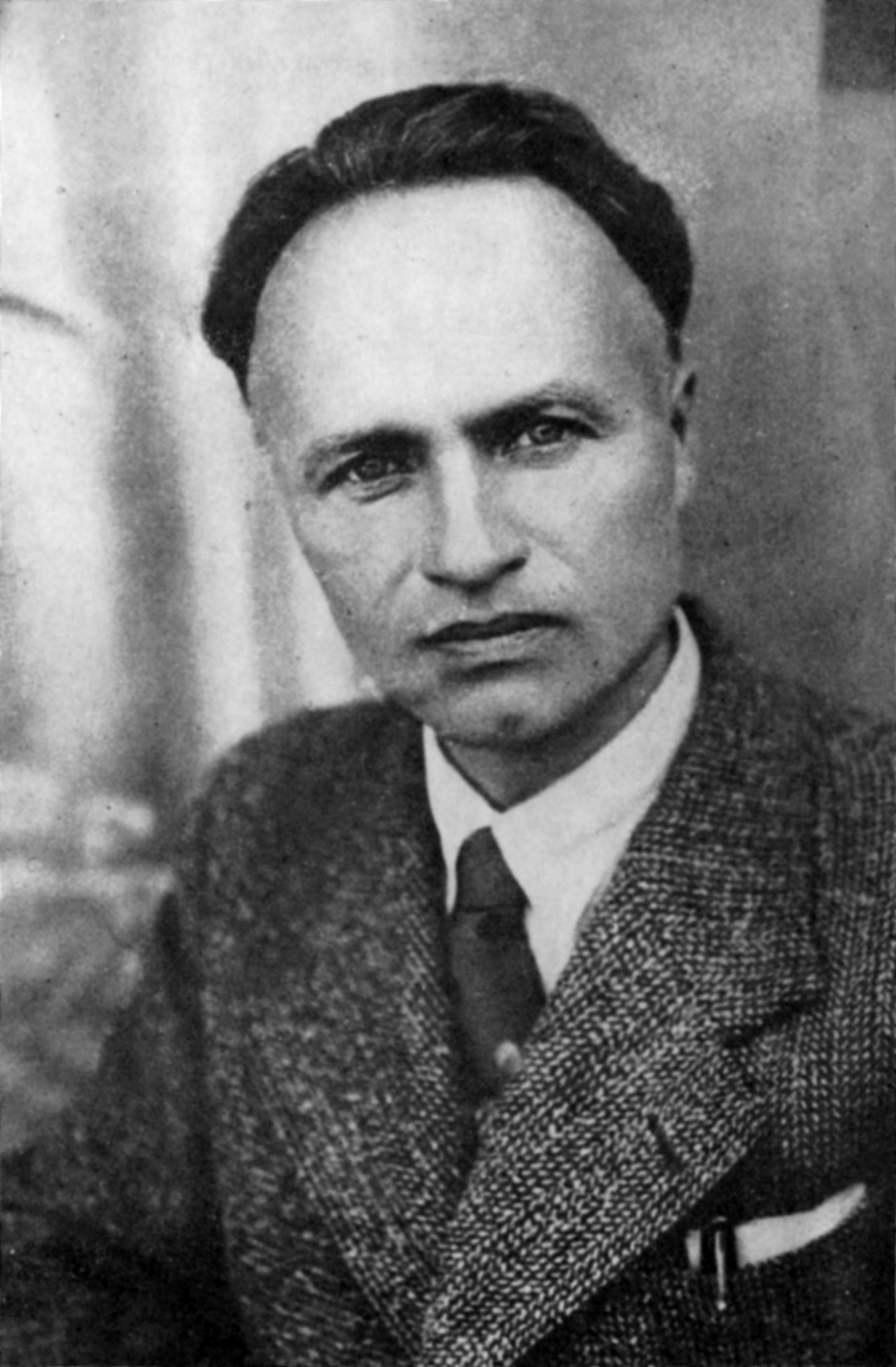
- Julian Przyboś in 1940s
- Born: 5 March 1901; Gwoźnica, Austria-Hungary
- Died: 6 October 1970 (aged 69); Warsaw, Polish People's Republic
- Occupations: Poet, essayist, translator
- Writing career
- Movement: Kraków Avant-Garde

Julian Przyboś (5 March 1901 – 6 October 1970) was a Polish poet, essayist and translator, one of the most important poets of the Kraków Avant-Garde.

== Life ==
Przyboś was born in Gwoźnica near Strzyżów to a peasant family. From 1912, he attended the Konarski Secondary School in Rzeszów.

A supporter of socialist ideals, in 1920 he volunteered for the Polish Army during the Polish–Soviet War. In 1920–1923 he studied Polish studies at the Jagiellonian University in Kraków. He was one of the contributors of Zwrotnica, magazine of the avant-garde artists in Kraków. Przyboś worked as a teacher in Sokal (1923–1925), Chrzanów (1925–1927), and Cieszyn (1927–1939). In Cieszyn, he published his works in Zaranie Śląskie (Silesian Dawn) (1929–1938). He also published in many other magazines before and after World War II.

In December 1939 Przyboś relocated to Lviv. In 1941 he was arrested by the Gestapo, the Nazi German secret police. After World War II he became a member of the Polish Workers' Party, and later of the Polish United Workers' Party. In 1947–1951 he was a diplomat in Switzerland. Afterward he was director of the Jagiellonian Library in Kraków. After the Hungarian Revolution of 1956, Przyboś left the Polish United Workers' Party.

== Works ==
- Śruby (1925)
- Oburącz (1926)
- Z ponad (also known as Sponad) (1930)
- W głąb las (1932)
- Równanie serca (1938)
- Póki my żyjemy (1944)
- Miejsce na ziemi (1945)
- Czytając Mickiewicza (1950)
- Rzut pionowy (1952) - poetry collection
- Najmniej słów. Poezje. Materiały poetyckie. Objaśnienia (1955)
- Linia i gwar, vol. 1-2 (1956)
- Narzędzie ze światła (1958)
- Więcej o manifest (1962)
- Sens poetycki (1963)
- Na znak (1965)
- Kwiat nieznany (1968)

== See also ==
- List of Poles
