= Old Jewish Cemetery, Frysztak =

Cemetery in Frysztak, Poland

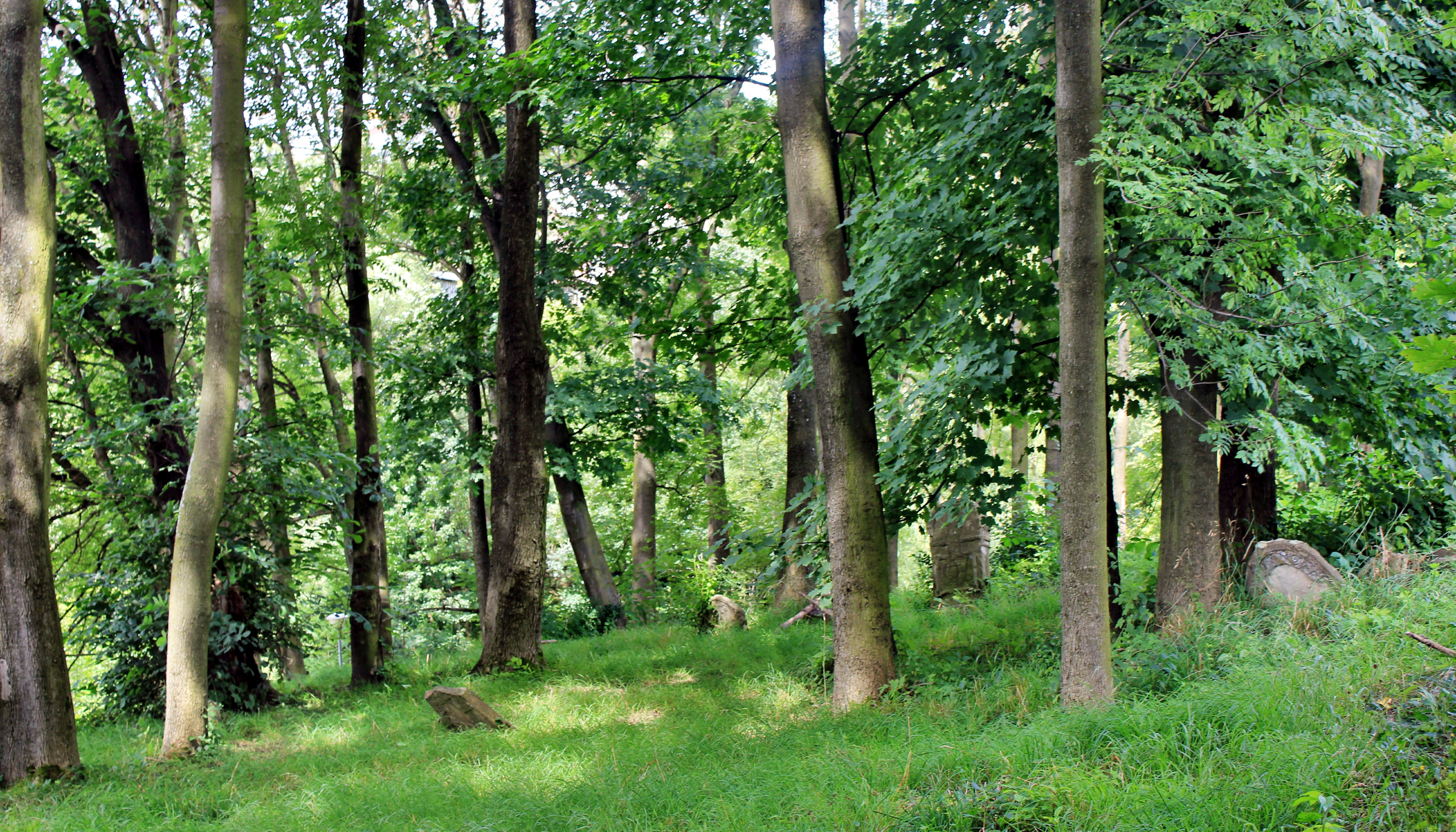
- General view in 2013
- Interactive map of Old Jewish Cemetery, Frysztak

Details
- Established: 17th century
- Location: Frysztak, Poland
- Country: Poland
- Coordinates: 49°50′03″N 21°36′32″E
- Type: Jewish cemetery
- Size: 0.46 ha

The Old Jewish Cemetery (Polish: Stary Cmentarz Żydowski we Frysztaku) in Frysztak, Poland, was established probably in the 17th century and not later than 1860s, and is located at present-day Parkowa Street south of the town square.

Around thirty matzevahs and the remnants of the old cemetery wall remain until the present-day. The grave of Esther Etel Elbaum (d. 1800), daughter of Rebbe Elimelech of Lizhensk, surrounded by a metal fence is especially noteworthy.

== Gallery ==
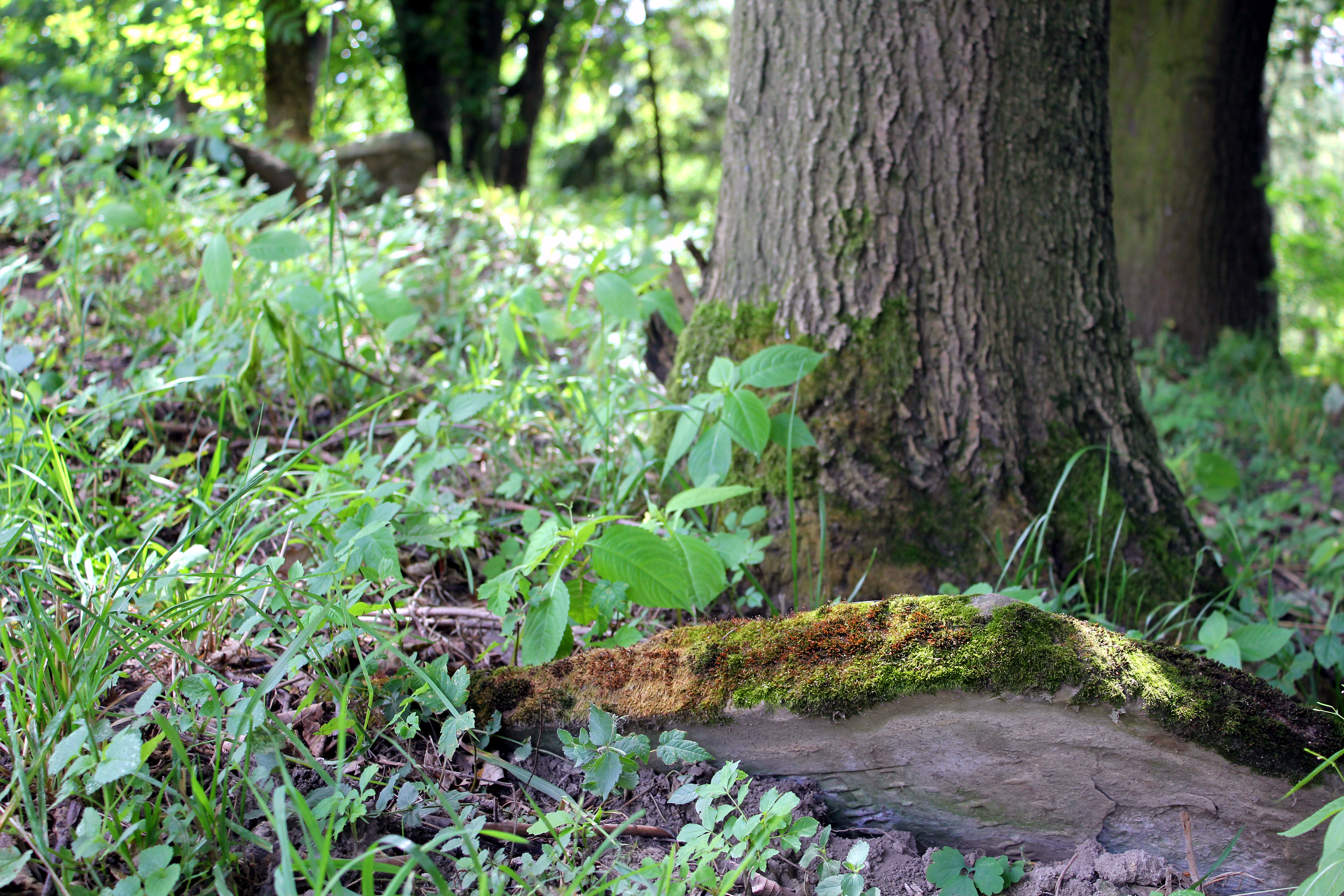
One of the matzevahs, fallen and covered with moss

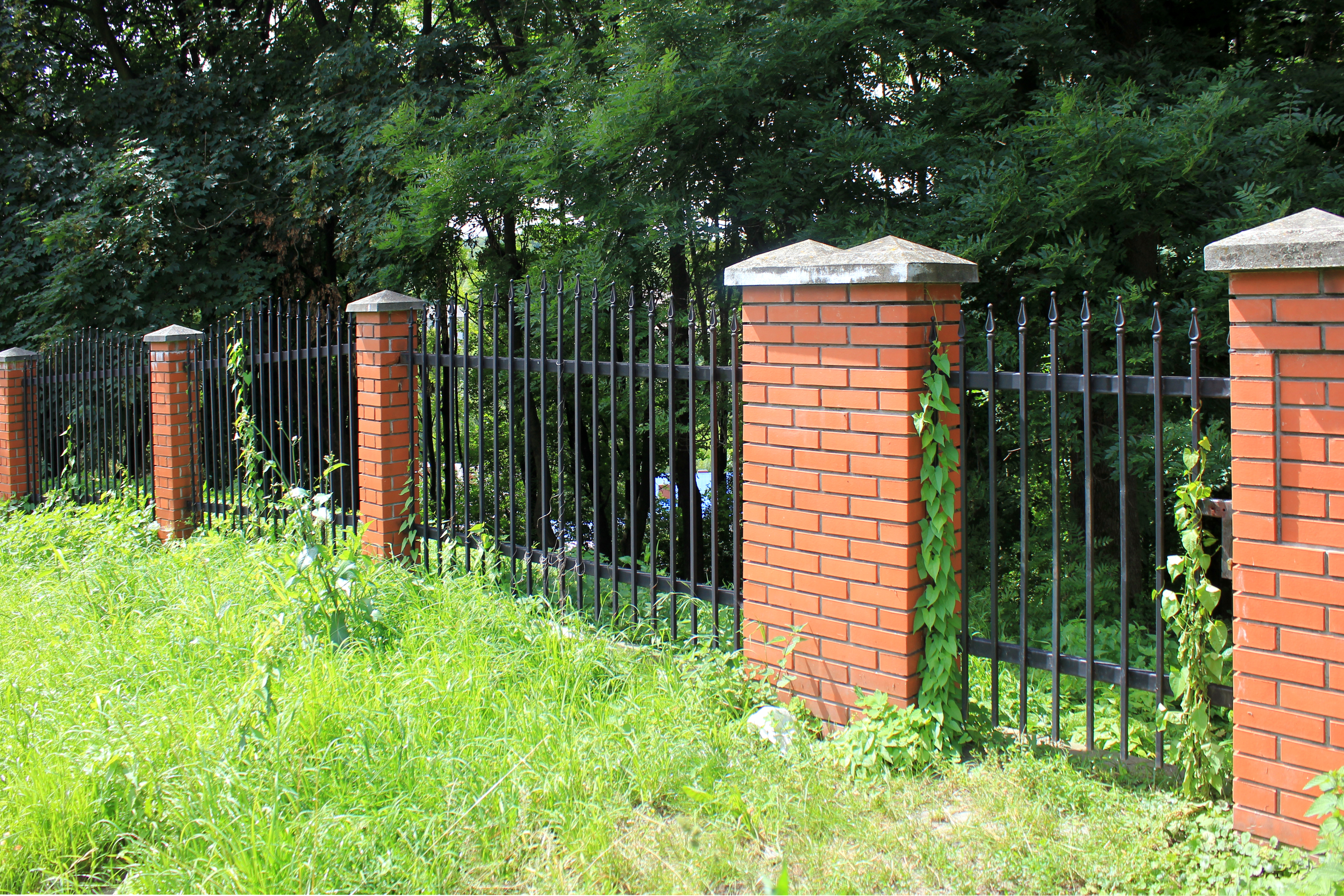
The modern wall surrounding part of the cemetery grounds

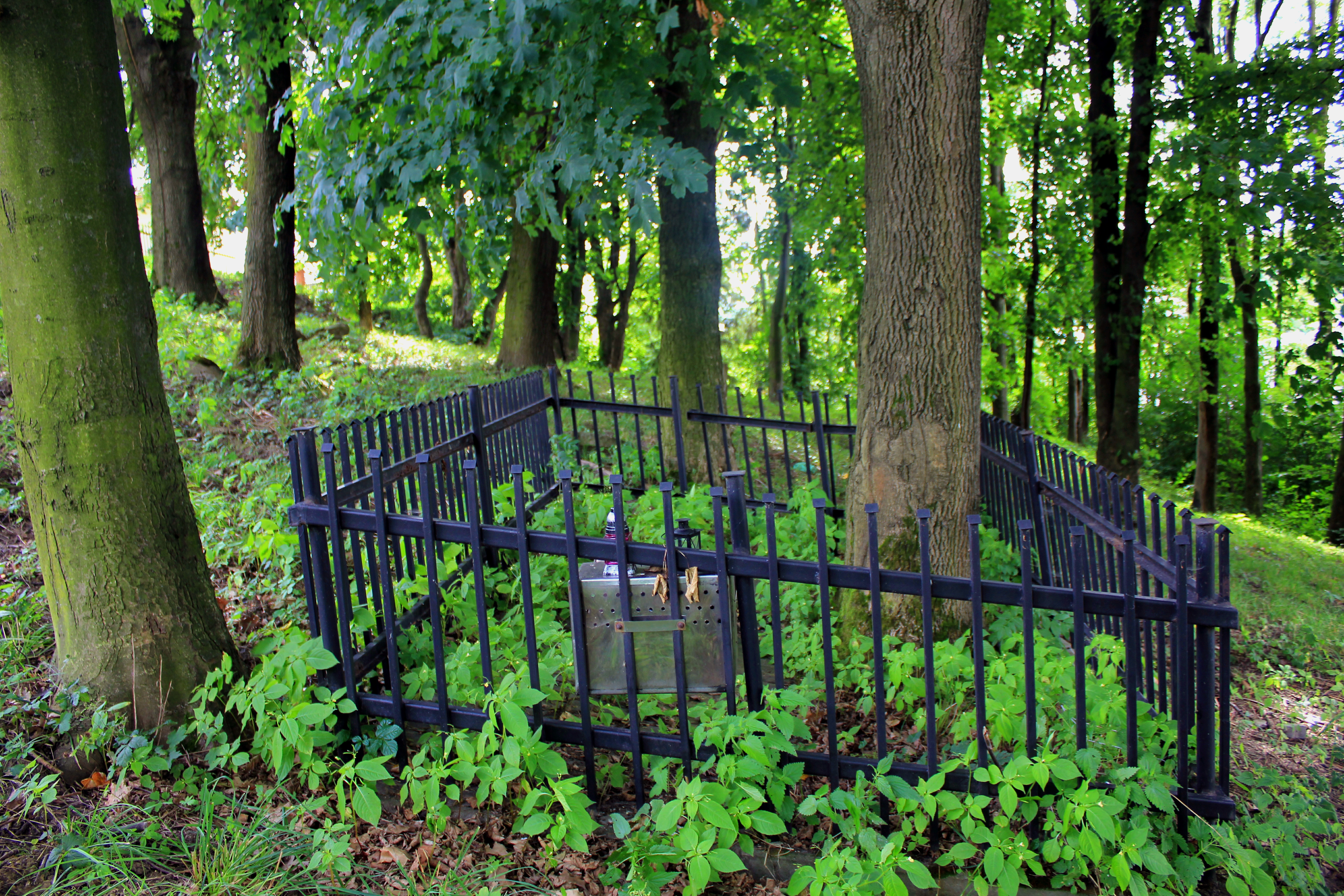
The grave of daughter of Rebbe Elimelech, Esther Etel Elbaum

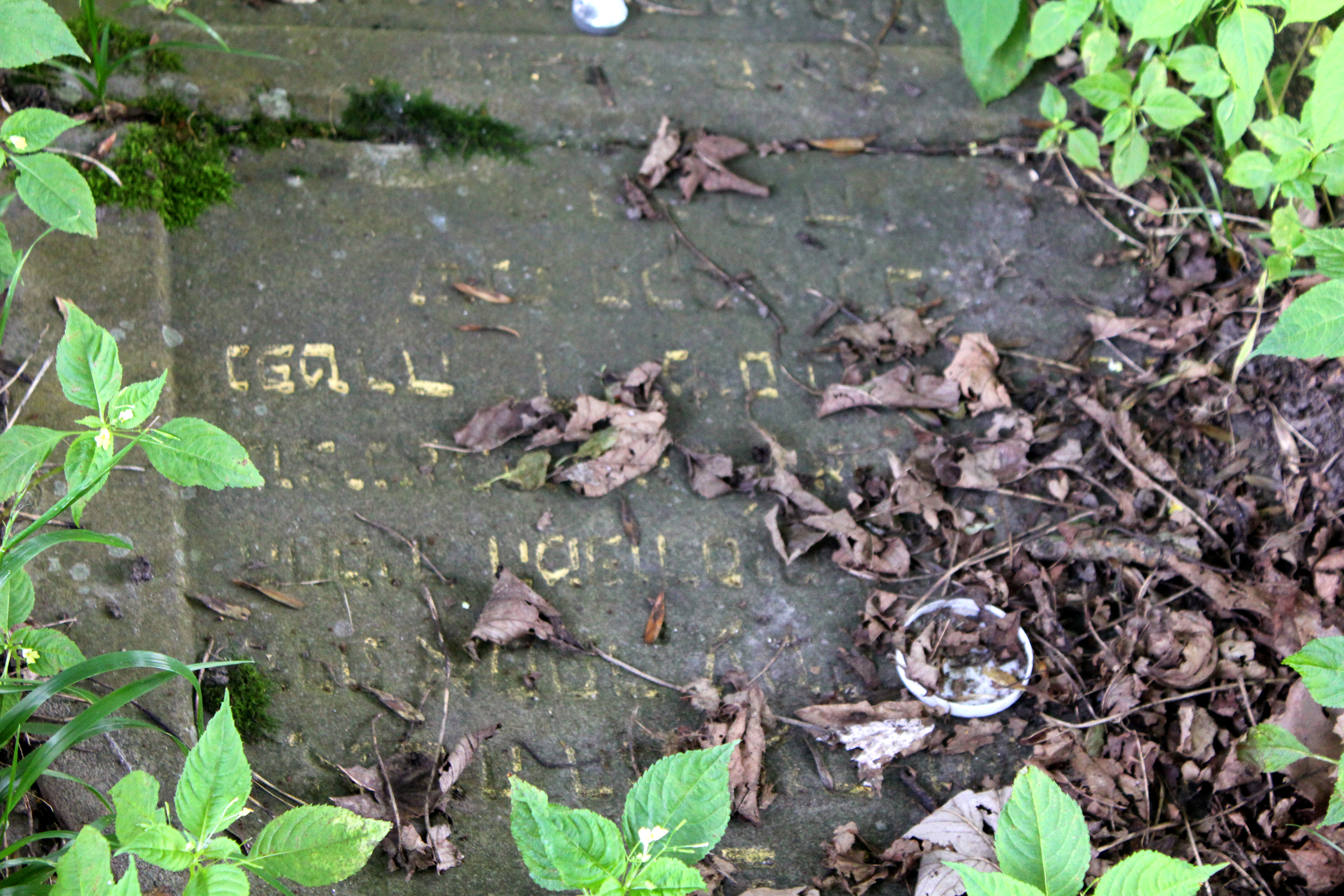
The tombstone of daughter of Rebbe Elimelech, Esther Etel Elbaum

== Bibliography ==
- Burchard, Przemysław (1990). Pamiątki i zabytki kultury żydowskiej w Polsce (Objects and Monuments of Historic Value of the Jewish Culture in Poland). Warszawa: Druk. w Zakladach Graficznych. p. 270.
