= Gogołów, Podkarpackie Voivodeship =

Gogołów
- Village
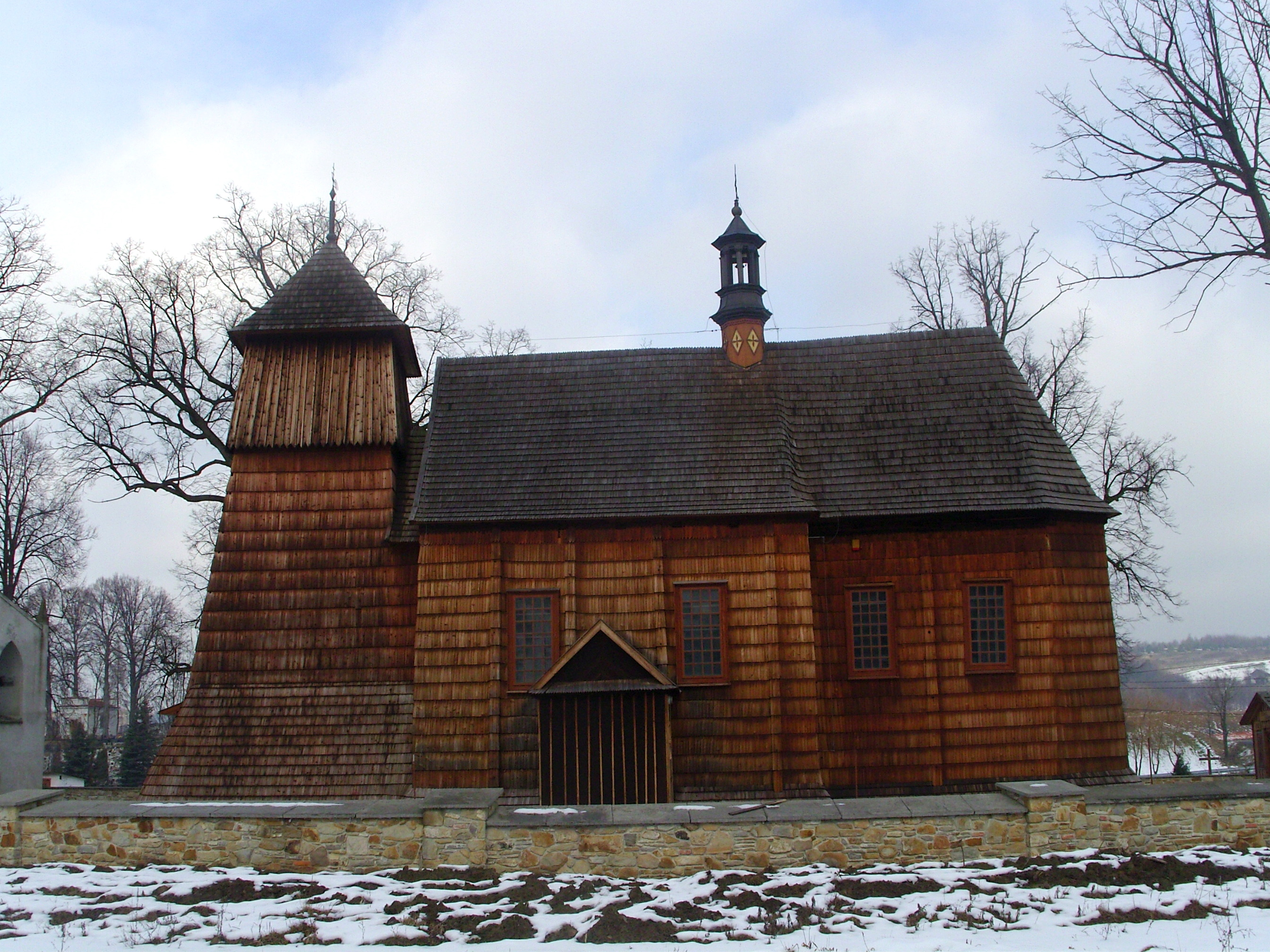
- St. Catherine Church from 1672

- Location within Poland
- Coordinates: 49°51′8″N 21°30′33″E
- Country: Poland
- Voivodeship: Subcarpathian
- County: Strzyżów
- Gmina: Frysztak

Gogołów [ɡɔˈɡɔwuf] is a village in the administrative district of Gmina Frysztak, within Strzyżów County, Subcarpathian Voivodeship, in south-eastern Poland.
