= Wiśniowa, Strzyżów County =

Wiśniowa
- Village
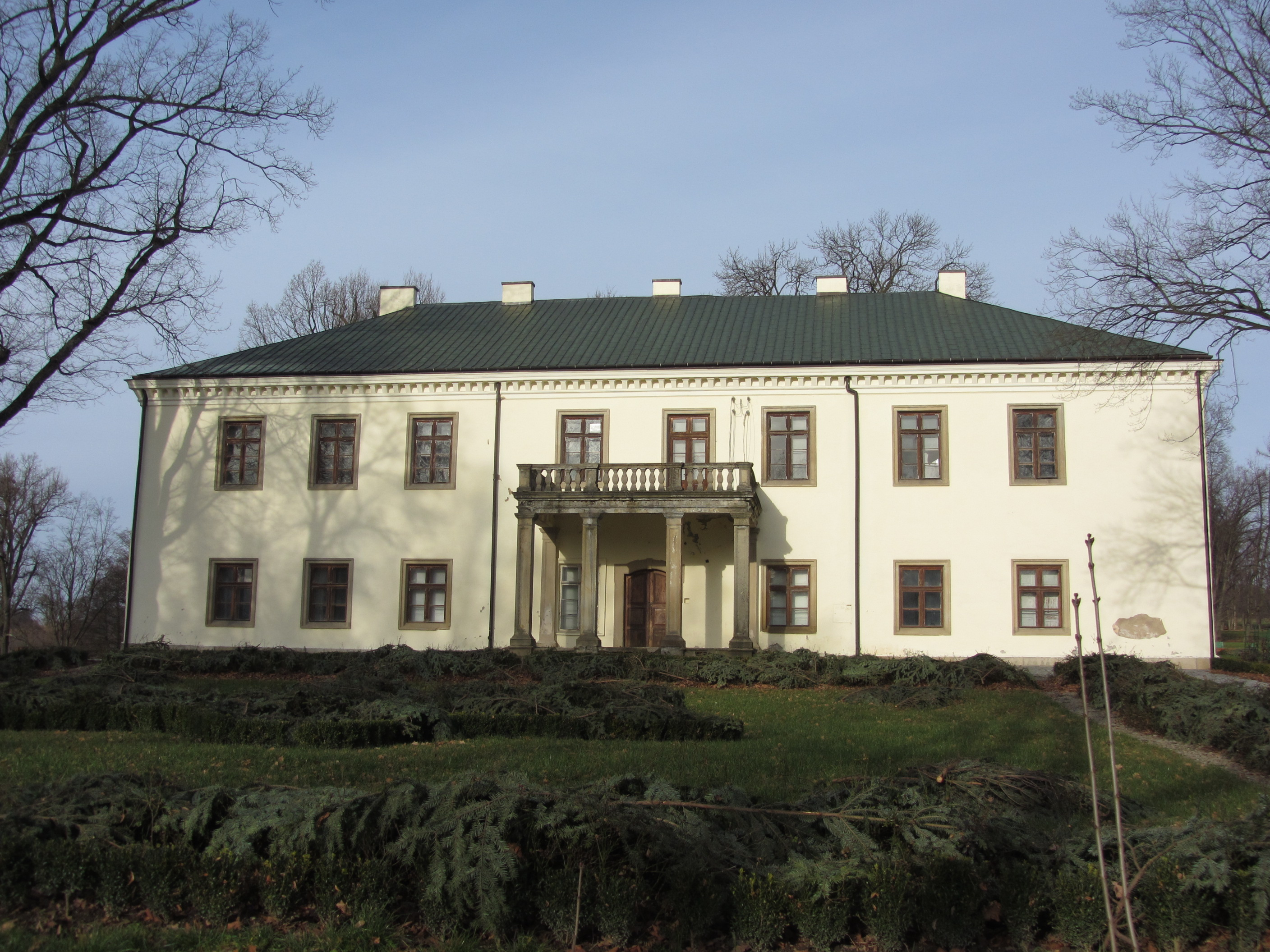
- Manor in Wiśniowa

- Location within Poland
- Coordinates: 49°52′N 21°38′E
- Country: Poland
- Voivodeship: Subcarpathian
- County: Strzyżów
- Gmina: Wiśniowa

Population
  - Total: 1,826

Wiśniowa [vʲiɕˈɲɔva] is a village in Strzyżów County, Subcarpathian Voivodeship, in south-eastern Poland. It is the seat of the gmina (administrative district) called Gmina Wiśniowa.
