= Jalu Kurek =

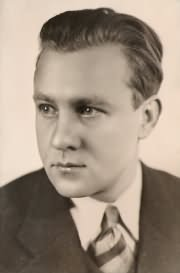
Jalu Kurek

Jalu Kurek (29 February 1904, in Kraków – 10 November 1983, in Rabka) was a Polish poet and prose writer, one of the figures of the so-called Kraków avant-garde. He was one of the contributors of the group's magazine Zwrotnica. He was a laureate of the Young Poland Literary Award for the novel "Grypa szaleje w Naprawie" ("Influenza ravages Naprawa").

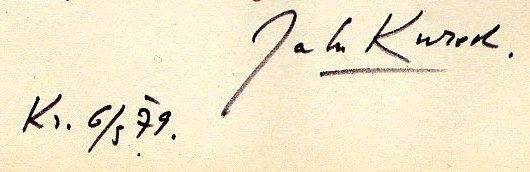
His autograph asked for in Cracow (Septembre 1979)

He graduated from the Bartłomiej Nowodworski High School in Kraków and obtained a master's degree in philosophy from Jagiellonian University. He continued his studies at University of Naples. He was a lifelong friend of Filippo Tommaso Marinetti.
