= Czudec =

- Village
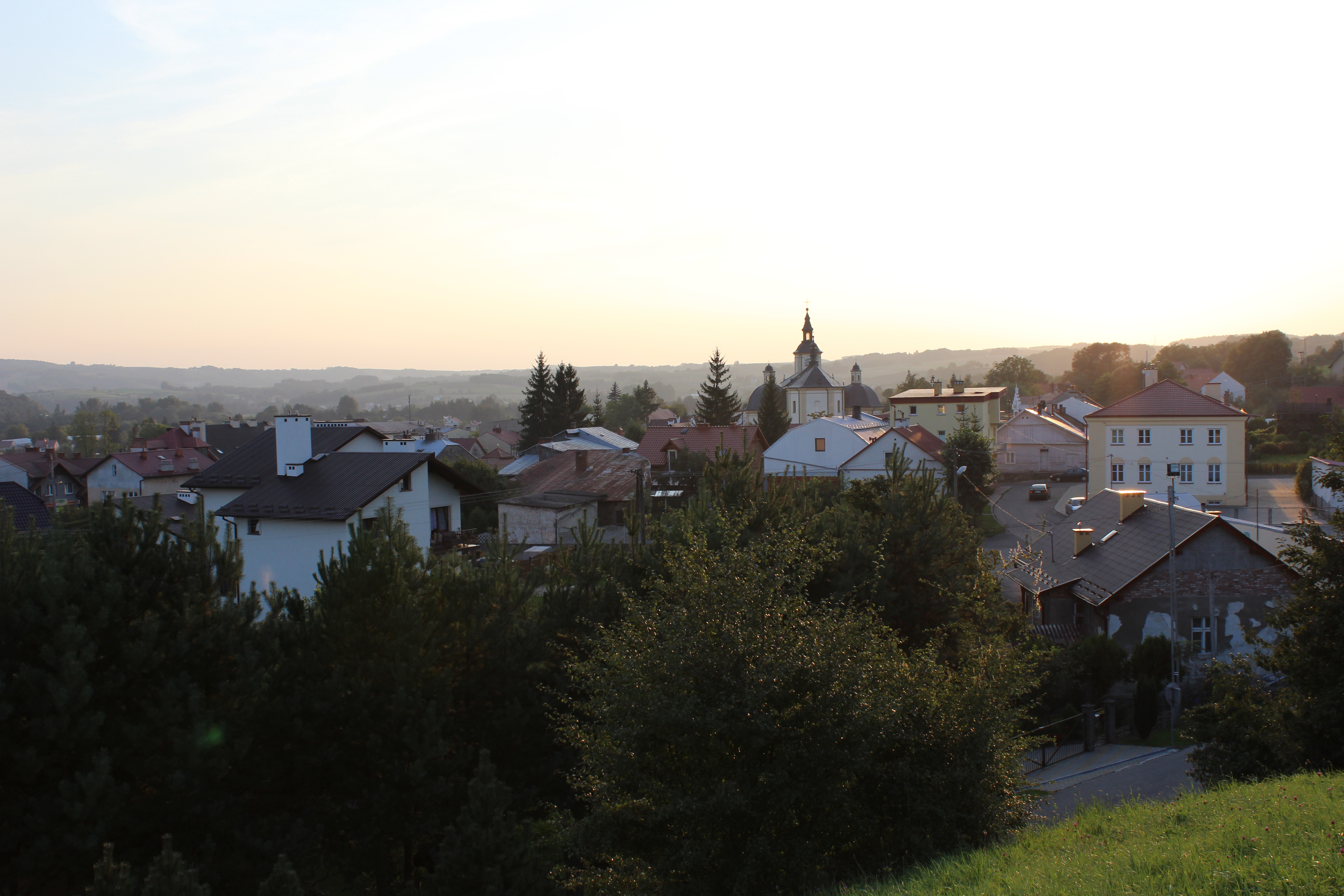
- Czudec

- Location within Poland
- Coordinates: 49°56′44″N 21°50′17″E
- Country: Poland
- Voivodeship: Subcarpathian
- County: Strzyżów
- Gmina: Czudec

Population
  - Total: 2,900
- Time zone: UTC+1 (CET)
  - Summer (DST): UTC+2 (CEST)
- Website: http://www.czudec.pl/

Czudec [ˈt͡ʂudɛt͡s] is a village (formerly a town) in Strzyżów County, Subcarpathian Voivodeship, in south-eastern Poland. It is the seat of the gmina (administrative district) called Gmina Czudec.

== History ==
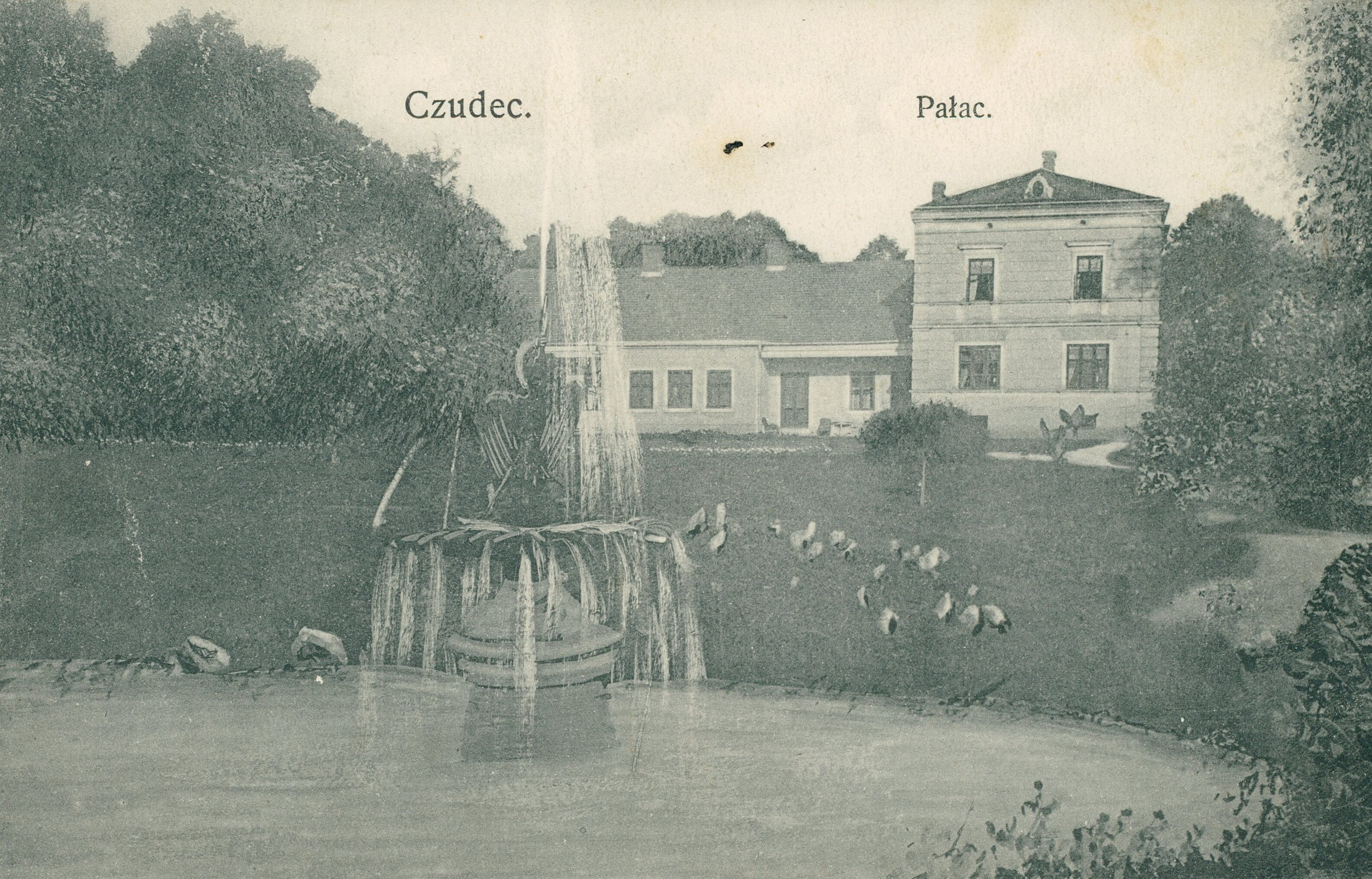
Palace, ca 1915

The history of Czudec dates back to the year 1185, when Mikołaj Bogoria from the town of Bogoria near Sandomierz granted a number of Lesser Poland’s villages to the newly established Koprzywnica Cistercian abbey. Among those villages was Czudec. In 1263 in Tarnów, Lesser Poland's prince Bolesław V the Chaste met with Daniel of Galicia, to establish a border between the two states. According to their agreement, Czudec was to remain within Lesser Poland, while nearby Rzeszów belonged to Red Ruthenia.

On September 11, 1427, King Władysław II Jagiełło granted Magdeburg rights town charter to Czudec. The new town was permitted to have one fair a week, and to create several guilds. Until 1610, Czudec belonged to the Strzyżowski family. The town then passed into the hands of the Grabieński family (Pomian coat of arms), which owned it until 1840. Until 1772, Czudec was administratively located in the Pilzno County in the Sandomierz Voivodeship in the Lesser Poland Province. After the Partitions of Poland, it was annexed by the Habsburg Empire, and from 1772 to 1918, belonged to the province of Galicia. In the 19th century the town declined, as its artisans could not compete with modern industry. Finally, in 1919, the government of the Second Polish Republic stripped Czudec of the town charter; it has remained a village ever since.

== Sights ==
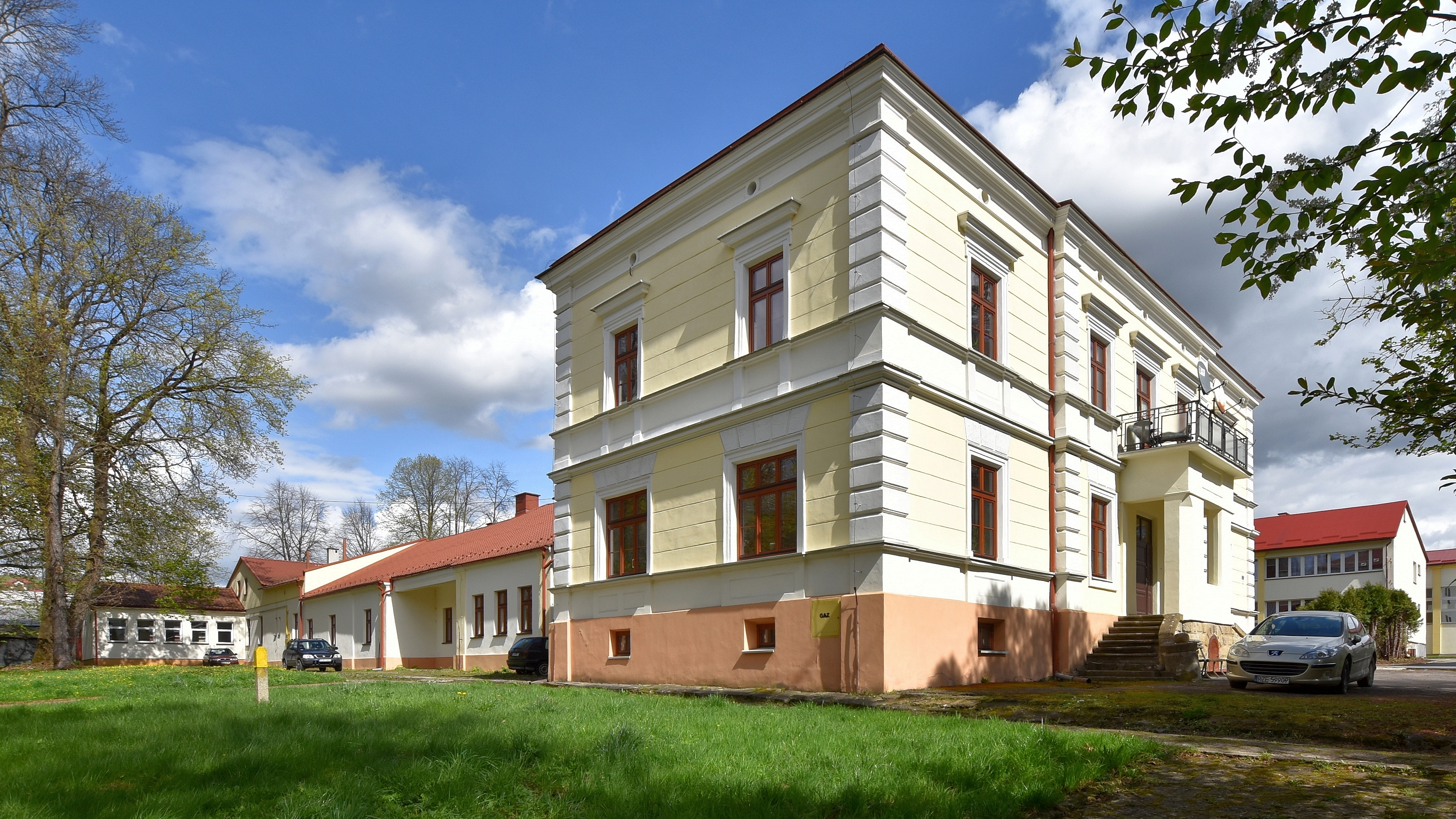
The palace today

- Baroque Holy Trinity parish church (1721–1735), built from stone of the ruined Czudec Castle,
- St. Martin roadside chapel (1692),
- a 17th-century manor house called Lamus, together with a park,
- wooden houses in the market square,
- ruins of the medieval Czudec Castle. The ruins are located on a hill called Góra Zamkowa, at the Wislok river. In 1938 and 1954, archaeologists found here several examples of Gothic brick walls. The castle dates back to the early years of Polish history, when it was a gord, guarding southeastern border of Lesser Poland. In the 14th century, a wooden complex was built, which was remodeled in Renaissance style in the 16th century. In 1657, during the Swedish invasion of Poland, the castle was destroyed by Transilvanian army of George II Rakoczi. The image of the castle was presented on the official seal of Czudec, in the period when it was a town (1427–1935). It also makes current coat of arms of the village.

== Transport ==
The village has a rail station on the secondary-importance line from Rzeszów to Jasło.
