= Strzyżów =

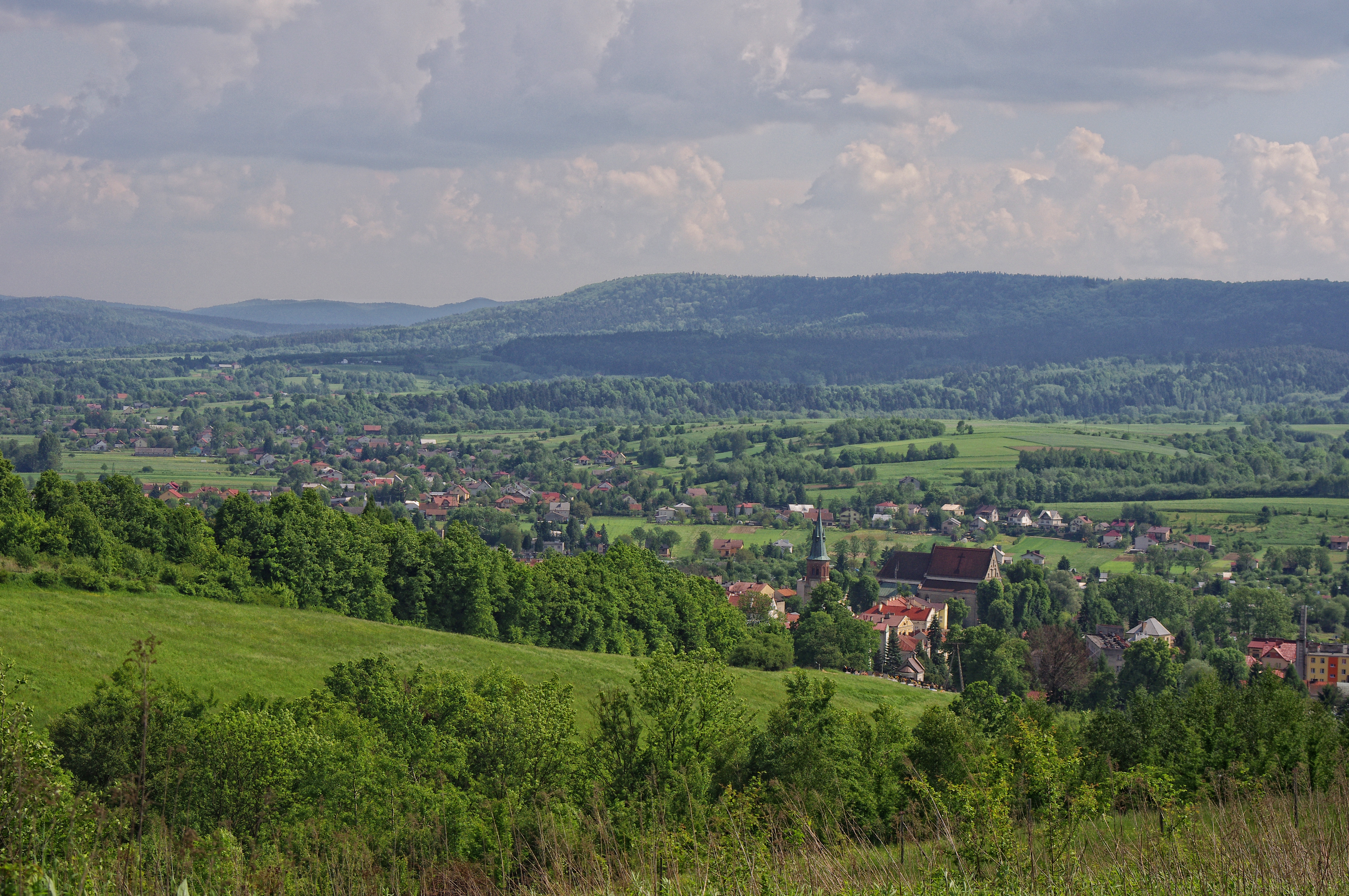
- Panorama of Strzyżów

- Coat of arms

- Location within Poland
- Coordinates: 49°53′N 21°47′E
- Country: Poland
- Voivodeship: Subcarpathian
- County: Strzyżów
- Gmina: Strzyżów
- Established: 9th century
- Town rights: 1373

Government
  - Mayor: Agata Gadziała

Area
  - Total: 13.89 km^{2} (5.36 sq mi)

Population (2025)
  - Total: 8,183
  - Density: 589.1/km^{2} (1,526/sq mi)
- Time zone: UTC+1 (CET)
  - Summer (DST): UTC+2 (CEST)
- Postal code: 38-100
- Area code: +48 17
- Car plates: RSR
- Website: http://www.strzyzow.pl

Strzyżów [ˈstʂɨʐuf] is a town in Strzyżów County, Subcarpathian Voivodeship, Poland, along the Wisłok river valley. Strzyżów is one of the towns within the Strzyżowsko-Dynowskie Foothill, located 160 kilometres (99 miles) south-east of Kraków and 30 km (19 mi) from Rzeszów. According to statistics from 30 June 2010 from GUS (the Central Statistical Office in Poland), there are 8,782 inhabitants.

== History ==
The history of Strzyżów dates back to the 9th century, to the times of the Wiślanie tribe (Vistulans) when a legendary pagan Vistulan prince is said to have built a watchtower by Stobnica and Wisłok river called "Strzeżno", for the defence of eastern borders of his land. In 1279, in Buda (Hungary), the Pope's legate named Bishop Philip confirmed the abbot's right to take a special tax (a tithe) from Czudec and Strzyżów.

Strzyżów obtained town rights between 1373 and 1397. The town was surrounded by a soil defence embankment (Zawale Street still exists and it relates to that embankment). These were the times of town splendour and its development, craft, farming and trade contracts with other towns in what is now Poland, Hungary and Slovakia. In 1373, Strzyżów came into the hands of a knight, Wojtko, and later Pakosz and his sons Jan and Mikołaj. With time the town changed its owners. On 15 August 1769 the Bar Confederates made an oath in front of the painting of Immaculate Mary in Strzyżów, in the presence of Casimir Pulaski and Franciszek Trzecielski. After this event, that image appeared on the Confederates’ Banner. In 1796 the foundation of secular school strengthened town development as well as royal permission for organisation of four fairs a year from 1684. Following the partitions of Poland in the late 18th century, the town became part of Austrian Galicia.

Throughout its history Strzyżów suffered from as many as nine fires, the last one in 1895 caused the populace to build buildings solely from brick. By 1880 Strzyżów was inhabited mostly by Poles, but there were also significant minorities such as the Jews and the Germans. In 1918, the town returned to Poland (Second Polish Republic), within which it was a county seat in the Lwów Voivodeship. In 1925, town limits were expanded by including Przedmieście Strzyżowskie (former suburb). Following the German-Soviet invasion of Poland, which started World War II in September 1939, the town was occupied by Germany until 1944. The 1960s and 1970s gave beginning to industrialisation; many factories, companies, schools and cultural centres were founded in the town's vicinity.

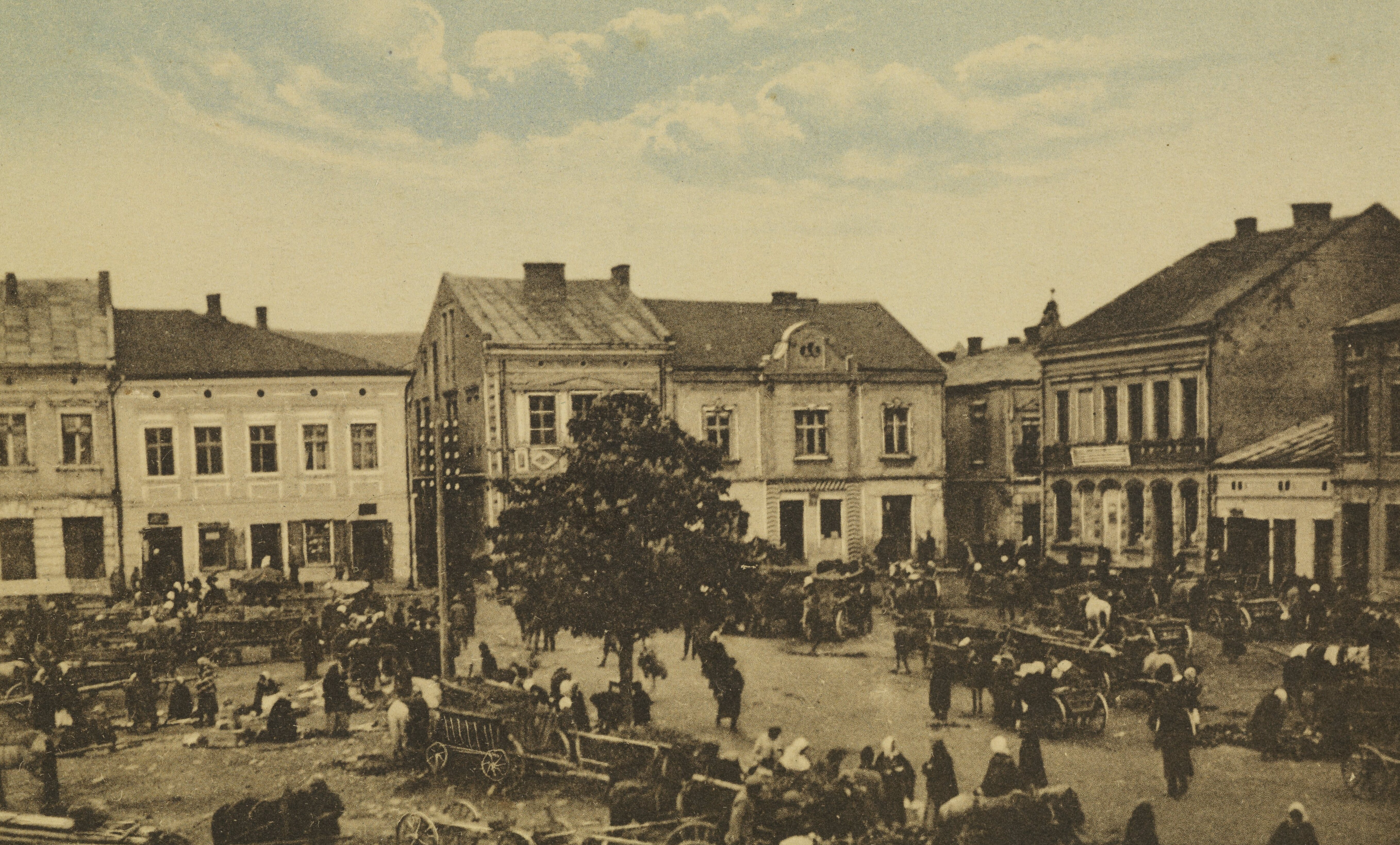
Market square, 1914-1931

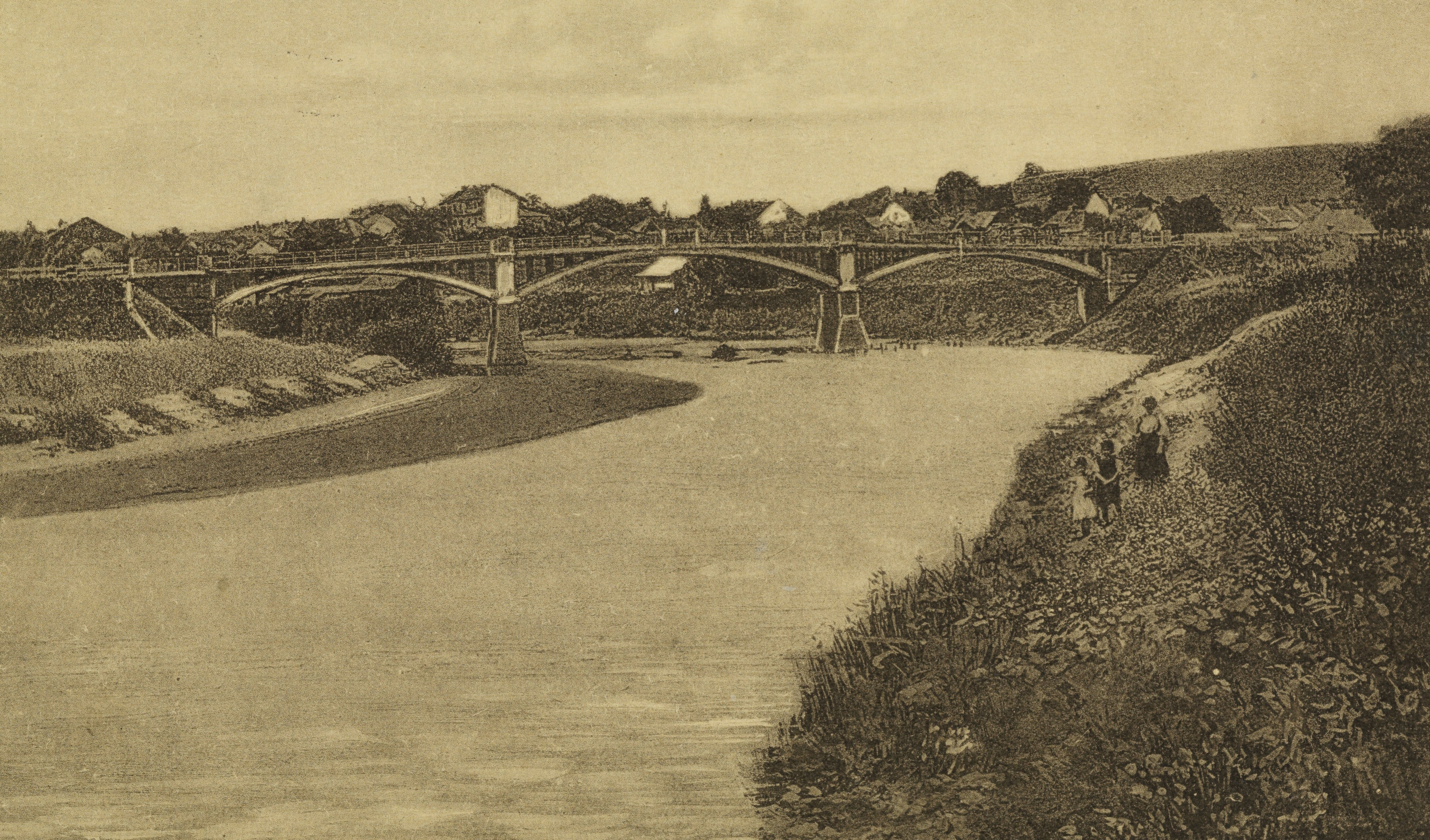
Bridge over the Wisłok, 1931

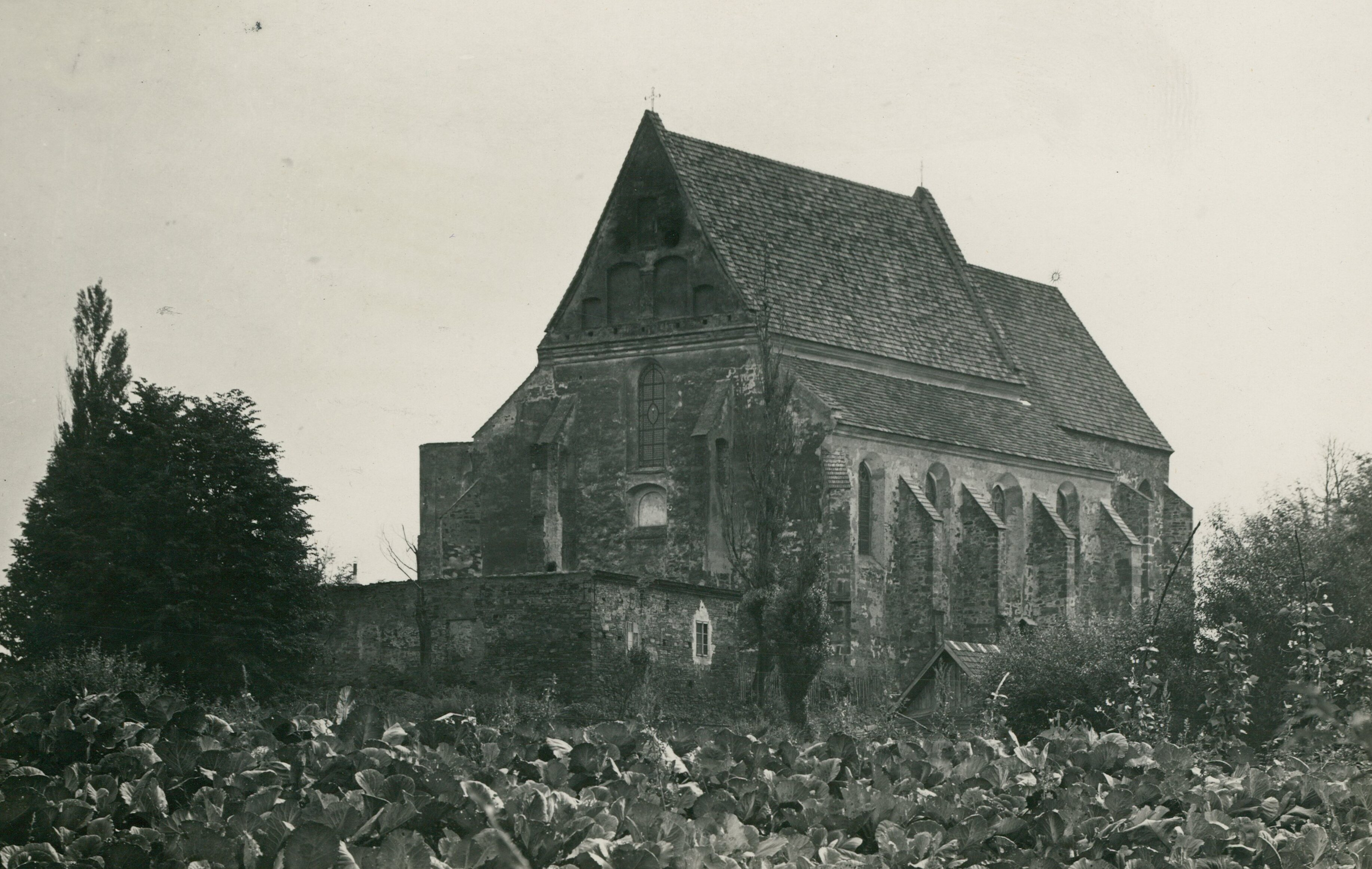
Collegiate church, ca 1915

== Cuisine ==
The officially protected traditional food of Strzyżów (as designated by the Ministry of Agriculture and Rural Development of Poland) is krówka mleczna strzyżowska, a local type of krówka (traditional Polish candy).

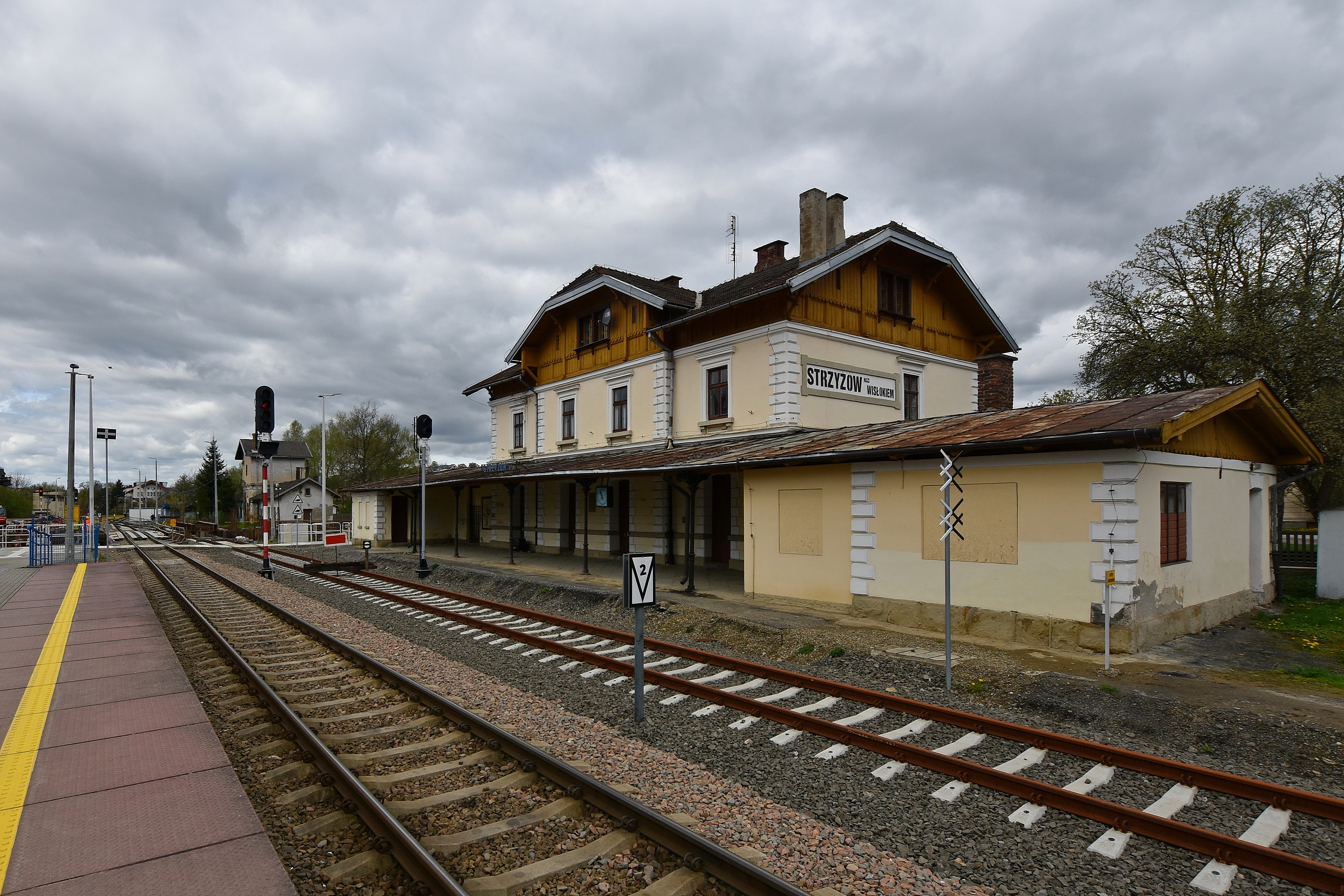
Railway station

== Schools ==
- Adam Mickiewicz Secondary School
- Technical Schools
- Municipal Schools
- White Eagle Primary School No. 1
- Maria Konopnicka Primary School No. 2
- Public Middle School No. 1
- Zygmunt Mycielski National School of Music - 1st degree
- Career Development Center

== Notable residents ==
- Mieczysław G. Bekker (1905–1989), engineer and scientist
- Tadeusz Lutak (1917-2026), soldier

== International relations ==
=== Twin towns — Sister cities ===
Strzyżów is twinned with:

| Bagnacavallo in Italy; Cissé in France; Horodok in Ukraine | Kisvárda in Hungary; Lassee in Austria; Svidník in Slovakia |
