= Strzyżów County =

Strzyżów County Powiat strzyżowski
- County
- Flag Coat of arms

- Location within the voivodeship
- Coordinates (Strzyżów): 49°53′N 21°47′E
- Country: Poland
- Voivodeship: Subcarpathian
- Seat: Strzyżów
- Gminas: Total 5: Gmina Czudec; Gmina Frysztak; Gmina Niebylec; Gmina Strzyżów; Gmina Wiśniowa

Area
  - Total: 503.36 km^{2} (194.35 sq mi)

Population (2019)
  - Total: 61,505
  - Density: 122.19/km^{2} (316.47/sq mi)
  - Urban: 8,884
  - Rural: 52,621
- Car plates: RSR
- Website: www.strzyzowpowiat.un.pl

Strzyżów County (Polish: powiat strzyżowski) is a unit of territorial administration and local government (powiat) in Subcarpathian Voivodeship, south-eastern Poland. It came into being on January 1, 1999, as a result of the Polish local government reforms passed in 1998. Its administrative seat and only town is Strzyżów, which lies 24 kilometres (15 mi) south-west of the regional capital Rzeszów.

The county covers an area of 503.36 square kilometres (194.3 sq mi). As of 2019 its total population is 61,505, out of which the population of Strzyżów is 8,884 and the rural population is 52,621.

== Places of interest ==
Places of historical interest include the palace and park complex in Wiśniowa, the 15th century church complex in Strzyżów, the 18th century manorial complex on Modrzewiowa Street in Strzyżów, synagogues in Czudec, Niebylec and Strzyżów, the palace complex in Żyznów, wooden churches in Lutcza and Gogołów and Greek Catholic Churches in Brzeżanka and Oparówka. There are also two complexes of fortifications from the time of World War II, one in Stępina and the other in Strzyżów.

As regards the natural geography of the region, the valley of the Wisłok and its tributaries are interspersed with the low, sparsely wooded hills of the Dynowsko-Strzyżowskie Plateau. The region also includes the Czarnorzecko-Strzyżowski Landscape Park and the Sędziszowsko-Strzyżowska and Hyżyńsko-Gwoźnicka protected areas.

== Neighbouring counties ==
Strzyżów County is bordered by Ropczyce-Sędziszów County to the north, Rzeszów County to the north-east, Brzozów County to the south-east, Krosno County to the south, Jasło County to the south-west and Dębica County to the north-west.

== Administrative divisions ==
The county is subdivided into five gminas (one urban-rural and four rural). These are listed in the following table, in descending order of population.

Gmina	Type	Area (km^{2})	Population (2019)	Seat
Gmina Strzyżów	urban-rural	140.2	20,727	Strzyżów
Gmina Czudec	rural	85.0	11,815	Czudec
Gmina Frysztak	rural	90.5	10,392	Frysztak
Gmina Niebylec	rural	104.4	10,534	Niebylec
Gmina Wiśniowa	rural	83.3	8,037	Wiśniowa
