= Kawęczyn =

Kawęczyn may refer to the following places:

- Kawęczyn, Turek County in Greater Poland Voivodeship (west-central Poland)
- Kawęczyn, Września County in Greater Poland Voivodeship (west-central Poland)
- Kawęczyn, Inowrocław County in Kuyavian-Pomeranian Voivodeship (north-central Poland)
- Kawęczyn, Toruń County in Kuyavian-Pomeranian Voivodeship (north-central Poland)
- Kawęczyn, Piotrków County in Łódź Voivodeship (central Poland)
- Kawęczyn, Radomsko County in Łódź Voivodeship (central Poland)
- Kawęczyn, Skierniewice County in Łódź Voivodeship (central Poland)
- Kawęczyn, Gmina Rzeczyca, Tomaszów County in Łódź Voivodeship (central Poland)
- Kawęczyn, Janów County in Lublin Voivodeship (east Poland)
- Kawęczyn, Gmina Chodel in Opole County, Lublin Voivodeship (east Poland)
- Kawęczyn, Ryki County in Lublin Voivodeship (east Poland)
- Kawęczyn, Świdnik County in Lublin Voivodeship (east Poland)
- Kawęczyn, Zamość County in Lublin Voivodeship (east Poland)
- Kawęczyn, Garwolin County in Masovian Voivodeship (east-central Poland)
- Kawęczyn, Gmina Konstancin-Jeziorna in Masovian Voivodeship (east-central Poland)
- Kawęczyn, Gmina Tarczyn in Masovian Voivodeship (east-central Poland)
- Kawęczyn, Sochaczew County in Masovian Voivodeship (east-central Poland)
- Kawęczyn, Podkarpackie Voivodeship (south-east Poland)
- Kawęczyn, Busko County in Świętokrzyskie Voivodeship (south-central Poland)
- Kawęczyn, Jędrzejów County in Świętokrzyskie Voivodeship (south-central Poland)
- Kawęczyn Sędziszowski in Ropczyce-Sędziszów County in Podkarpackie Voivodeship (southeast Poland)
- Kawęczyn-Wygoda, within Rembertów, Warsaw
