= Jarmoliński =

Jarmoliński, feminine: Jarmolińska is a Polish-language surname. The East-Slavic equivalent is Yarmolinsky. Notable people with this surname include:

- Aleksandra Jarmolińska (born 1990), Polish sports shooter
- Monika Jurek née Jarmolińska (born 1967), Polish teacher and politician
- Stanisław Jarmoliński (born 1944), Polish politician and physician
