= Wolica Piaskowa =

- Village
- Location within Poland
- Coordinates: 50°5′N 21°43′E
- Country: Poland
- Voivodeship: Subcarpathian
- County: Ropczyce-Sędziszów
- Gmina: Sędziszów Małopolski
- Population: 3,100

Wolica Piaskowa [vɔˈlit͡sa pjasˈkɔva] is a village in the administrative district of Gmina Sędziszów Małopolski, within Ropczyce-Sędziszów County, Subcarpathian Voivodeship, in south-eastern Poland.
