= Gmina Wielopole Skrzyńskie =

Gmina Wielopole Skrzyńskie Wielopole Skrzyńskie Commune
- Gmina
- Coat of arms
- Interactive map of Gmina Wielopole Skrzyńskie
- Coordinates (Wielopole Skrzyńskie): 49°57′N 21°37′E
- Country: Poland
- Voivodeship: Subcarpathian
- County: Ropczyce-Sędziszów
- Seat: Wielopole Skrzyńskie

Area
  - Total: 93.22 km^{2} (35.99 sq mi)

Population (2006)
  - Total: 8,380
  - Density: 89.9/km^{2} (233/sq mi)
- Website: http://www.wielopole.eu/

Gmina Wielopole Skrzyńskie is a rural gmina (administrative district) in Ropczyce-Sędziszów County, Subcarpathian Voivodeship, in south-eastern Poland. Its seat is the village of Wielopole Skrzyńskie, which lies approximately 16 kilometres (10 mi) south of Ropczyce and 30 km (19 mi) west of the regional capital Rzeszów.

The gmina covers an area of 93.22 square kilometres (35.99 sq mi), and as of 2022 its total population is 8,380.

== Villages ==
Gmina Wielopole Skrzyńskie contains the villages and settlements of Broniszów, Brzeziny, Glinik, Nawsie and Wielopole Skrzyńskie.

== Neighbouring gminas ==
Gmina Wielopole Skrzyńskie is bordered by the gminas of Brzostek, Czudec, Frysztak, Iwierzyce, Ropczyce, Sędziszów Małopolski, Strzyżów and Wiśniowa.
