= Gnojnica =

- Village
- Location within Poland
- Coordinates: 50°2′N 21°39′E
- Country: Poland
- Voivodeship: Subcarpathian
- County: Ropczyce-Sędziszów
- Gmina: Ropczyce
- Population: 2,100

Gnojnica [ɡnɔi̯ˈnit͡sa] is a village in the administrative district of Gmina Ropczyce, within Ropczyce-Sędziszów County, Subcarpathian Voivodeship, in south-eastern Poland.
