= Olchowa, Ropczyce-Sędziszów County =

Olchowa
- Village
- Location within Poland
- Coordinates: 50°03′20″N 21°45′36″E
- Country: Poland
- Voivodeship: Subcarpathian
- County: Ropczyce-Sędziszów
- Gmina: Iwierzyce
- Population: 1,100

Olchowa [ɔlˈxɔva] is a village in the administrative district of Gmina Iwierzyce, within Ropczyce-Sędziszów County, Subcarpathian Voivodeship, in south-eastern Poland.
