= Boreczek =

Boreczek may refer to the following places in Poland:

- Boreczek, Lower Silesian Voivodeship (south-west Poland)
- Boreczek, Subcarpathian Voivodeship (south-east Poland)
- Boreczek, Masovian Voivodeship (east-central Poland)
- Boreczek, Greater Poland Voivodeship (west-central Poland)
- Boreczek, Warmian-Masurian Voivodeship (north Poland)
- Boreczek, Podkarpackie Voivodeship (south-east Poland)
