= Bystrzyca, Podkarpackie Voivodeship =

Bystrzyca
- Village
- Location within Poland
- Coordinates: 49°59′35″N 21°44′8″E
- Country: Poland
- Voivodeship: Subcarpathian
- County: Ropczyce-Sędziszów
- Gmina: Iwierzyce

Bystrzyca [bɨsˈtʂɨt͡sa] is a village in the administrative district of Gmina Iwierzyce, within Ropczyce-Sędziszów County, Subcarpathian Voivodeship, in south-eastern Poland.
