= Wiśniowa, Ropczyce-Sędziszów County =

Wiśniowa
- Village
- Location within Poland
- Coordinates: 50°0′N 21°45′E
- Country: Poland
- Voivodeship: Subcarpathian
- County: Ropczyce-Sędziszów
- Gmina: Iwierzyce
- Population: 870

Wiśniowa [viɕˈɲɔva] is a village in the administrative district of Gmina Iwierzyce, within Ropczyce-Sędziszów County, Subcarpathian Voivodeship, in south-eastern Poland.
