= Gmina Sędziszów Małopolski =

Gmina Sędziszów Małopolski Sędziszów Małopolski Commune
- Gmina
- Coat of arms
- Interactive map of Gmina Sędziszów Małopolski
- Coordinates (Sędziszów Małopolski): 50°4′10″N 21°42′5″E
- Country: Poland
- Voivodeship: Subcarpathian
- County: Ropczyce-Sędziszów
- Seat: Sędziszów Małopolski

Area
  - Total: 155.71 km^{2} (60.12 sq mi)

Population (2006)
  - Total: 22,670
  - Density: 145.6/km^{2} (377.1/sq mi)
  - Urban: 7,121
  - Rural: 15,549
- Website: http://www.sedziszow-mlp.pl

Gmina Sędziszów Małopolski is an urban-rural gmina (administrative district) in Ropczyce-Sędziszów County, Subcarpathian Voivodeship, in south-eastern Poland. Its seat is the town of Sędziszów Małopolski, which lies approximately 6 kilometres (4 mi) east of Ropczyce and 23 km (14 mi) west of the regional capital Rzeszów.

The gmina covers an area of 155.71 square kilometres (60.1 sq mi), and as of 2022 its total population is 22,670 (out of which the population of Sędziszów Małopolski amounts to 7,121, and the population of the rural part of the gmina is 15,549).

== Villages ==
Apart from the town of Sędziszów Małopolski, Gmina Sędziszów Małopolski contains the villages and settlements of Będziemyśl, Boreczek, Borek Wielki, Cierpisz, Czarna Sędziszowska, Góra Ropczycka, Kawęczyn Sędziszowski, Klęczany, Krzywa, Ruda, Szkodna, Wolica Ługowa, Wolica Piaskowa and Zagorzyce.

== Neighbouring gminas ==
Gmina Sędziszów Małopolski is bordered by the gminas of Iwierzyce, Kolbuszowa, Niwiska, Ostrów, Ropczyce, Świlcza and Wielopole Skrzyńskie.
