= Sielec =

Sielec may refer to the following places:

== Belarus ==
- Sialiec, Biaroza Raion (western Belarus)

== Poland ==
- Sielec, Inowrocław County, Kuyavian-Pomeranian Voivodeship (north-central Poland)
- Sielec, Żnin County, Kuyavian-Pomeranian Voivodeship (north-central Poland)
- Sielec, Gmina Opoczno, Łódź Voivodeship (central Poland)
- Sielec, Gmina Żarnów, Łódź Voivodeship (central Poland)
- Sielec, Lublin Voivodeship (east Poland)
- Sielec, Grójec County, Masovian Voivodeship (east-central Poland)
- Sielec, Płońsk County, Masovian Voivodeship (east-central Poland)
- Sielec, Tarnobrzeg, Podkarpackie Voivodeship
- Sielec, Podkarpackie Voivodeship
- Sielec, Subcarpathian Voivodeship (south-east Poland)
- Sielec, Busko County, Świętokrzyskie Voivodeship (south-central Poland)
- Sielec, Jędrzejów County, Świętokrzyskie Voivodeship (south-central Poland)
- Sielec, Staszów County, Świętokrzyskie Voivodeship (south-central Poland)
- Sielec-Kolonia, Świętokrzyskie Voivodeship

== Ukraine ==
- Sielec, Drohobych Raion in Lviv Oblast (western Ukraine)

== See also ==
- Sielecki, a Polish surname
