= Sielecki =

Sas coat of arms of the Skrebeciowicz de Sielecki family

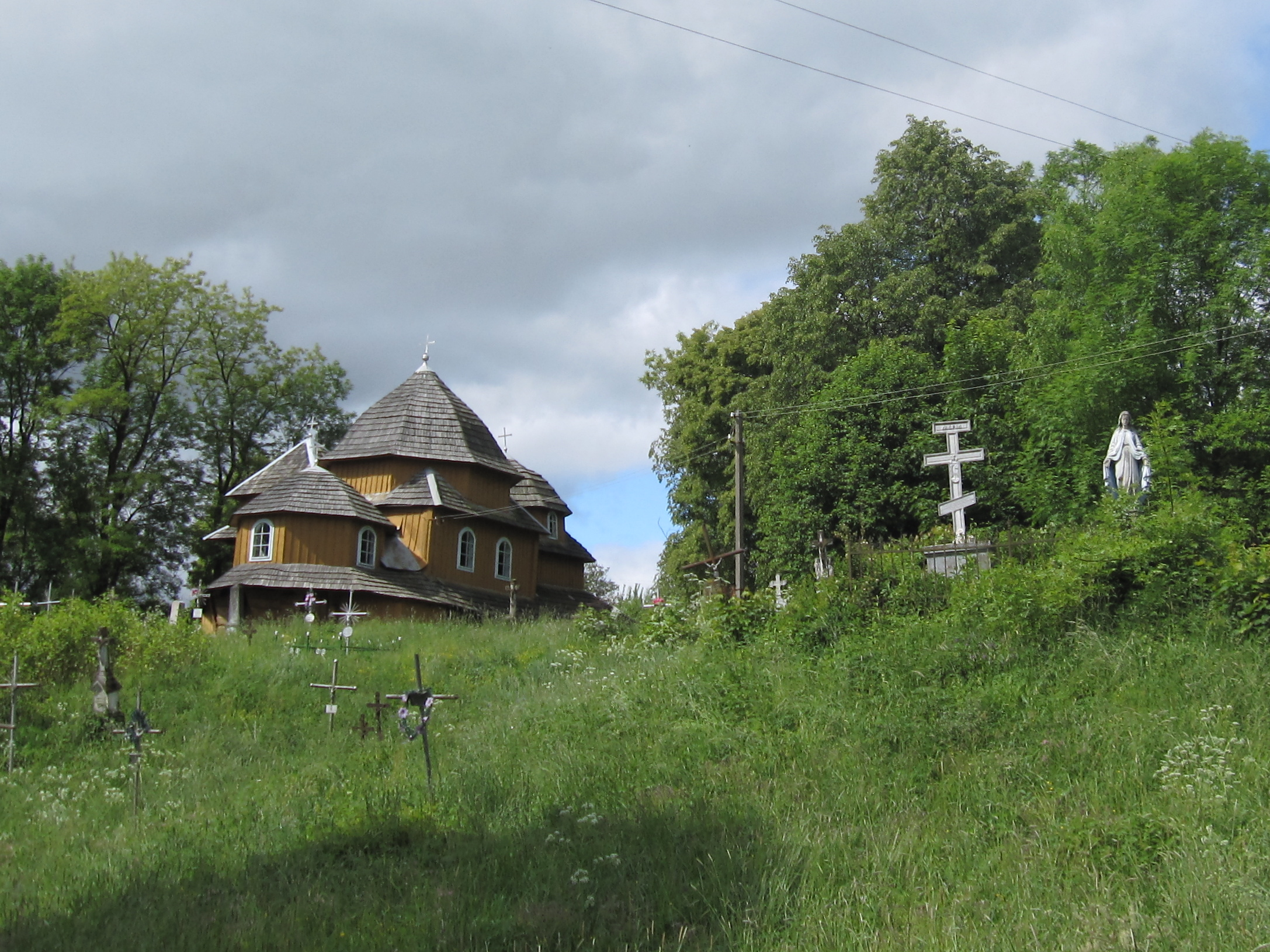
The village of Sielec in East Galicia (2009)

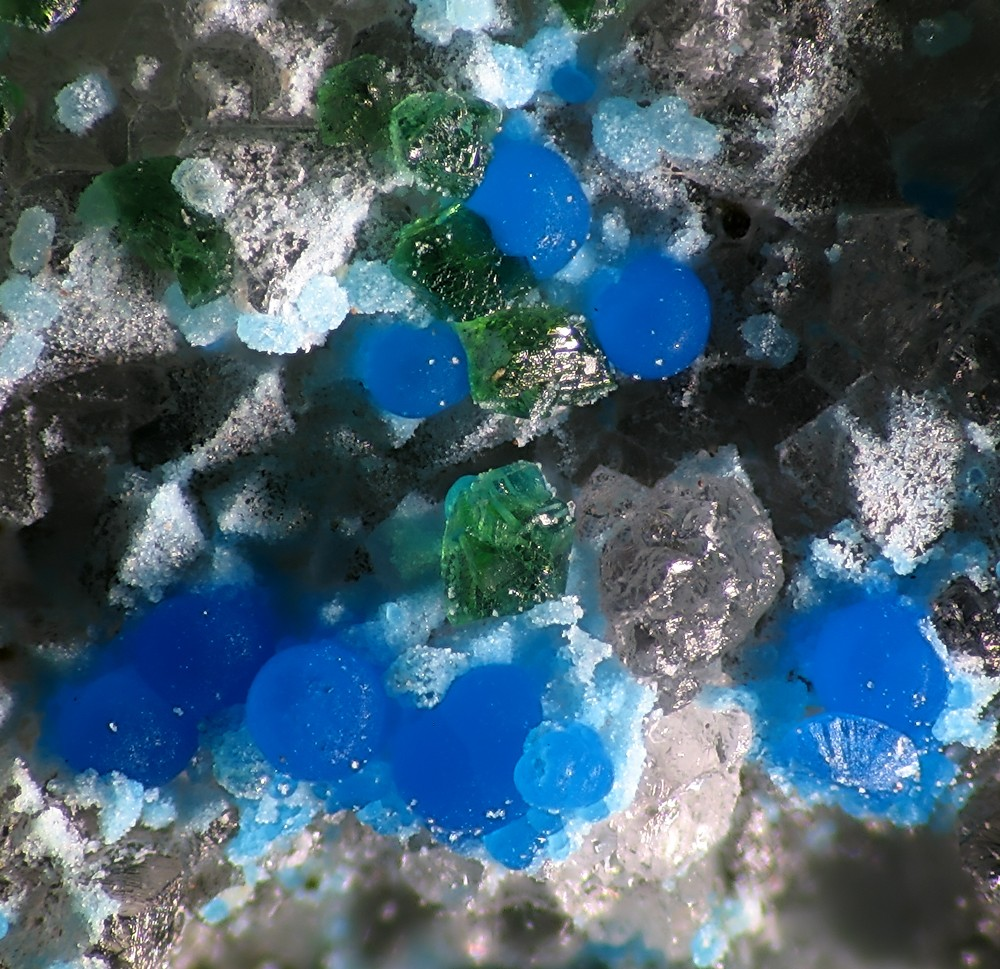
The mineral Sieleckiite

Sielecki (plural: Sieleccy, feminine form: Sielecka) is a Polish surname, also of one of the noble (szlachta) families. It is derived from the village of Sielec, of which many exist with that name in Poland, Ukraine and Belarus.

As is typical with Polish surnames, if noble families exist with the same family name but are not related to each other, a coat of arms was assigned to them in order to differentiate between each other. A person with the surname Sielecki does therefore not necessarily have to be related to each other or even be noble.

The Sielecki family from Sielec, Drohobych Raion were Eastern Catholics of the Byzantine rite, as well as Roman catholic, while there are other Sieleckis who are Jewish from places such as Lithuania and Belarus, many of whom live in Argentina and South America today.

== Skrebeciowicz de Sielecki ==
Around 1650 King John II Casimir awarded the Cossack Ataman Skrebeciowicz one half of the estate of Sielec, Drohobych Raion, as well as the right to bear the Sas coat of arms for his loyal services to the crown during the Khmelnytsky Uprising. After the Austrian partition of southern Poland in 1772, the Skrebeciowicz de Sielecki family's noble status was reaffirmed by the Habsburg emperor in Vienna who gave the hereditary title of Ritter (Knight). Members of the family were either Greek or Roman Catholic.

== Notable members ==
- Cyril Sielecki (1835–1918), Greek catholic clergyman and social activist, papal chamberlain and servant of God, Knight of the Order of Franz Joseph
- Johann Ritter von Sielecki (late 18th century–mid 19th century), Greek catholic archpriest at the diocese Przemyśl and vice-director of the local gymnasium, Knight of the Order of the Iron Crown
- Leon Ritter von Sielecki (fell in Tyrawa Wołoska on May 12, 1915), lieutenant of the Imperial and Royal Uhlan Regiment Nr. 13
- Klemens Stefan Sielecki (1903–1980), engineer and technical director of Fablok locomotives company, Knight of the Order of Polonia Restituta
- Manuel Sielecki (1909–1998), Polish-born Argentine entrepreneur and philanthropist
- Hubert Sielecki (b. 1946), Austrian artist, recipient of the Theodor Körner Prize 1982 and winner of the Diagonale short film price 1995
- Robert Sielecki (b. 1958), Australian geologist and entrepreneur, discoverer of the mineral Sieleckiite
- Christof Sielecki (b. 1974), German chess player
