= Kawęczyn Sędziszowski =

- Municipal part of Sędziszów Małopolski
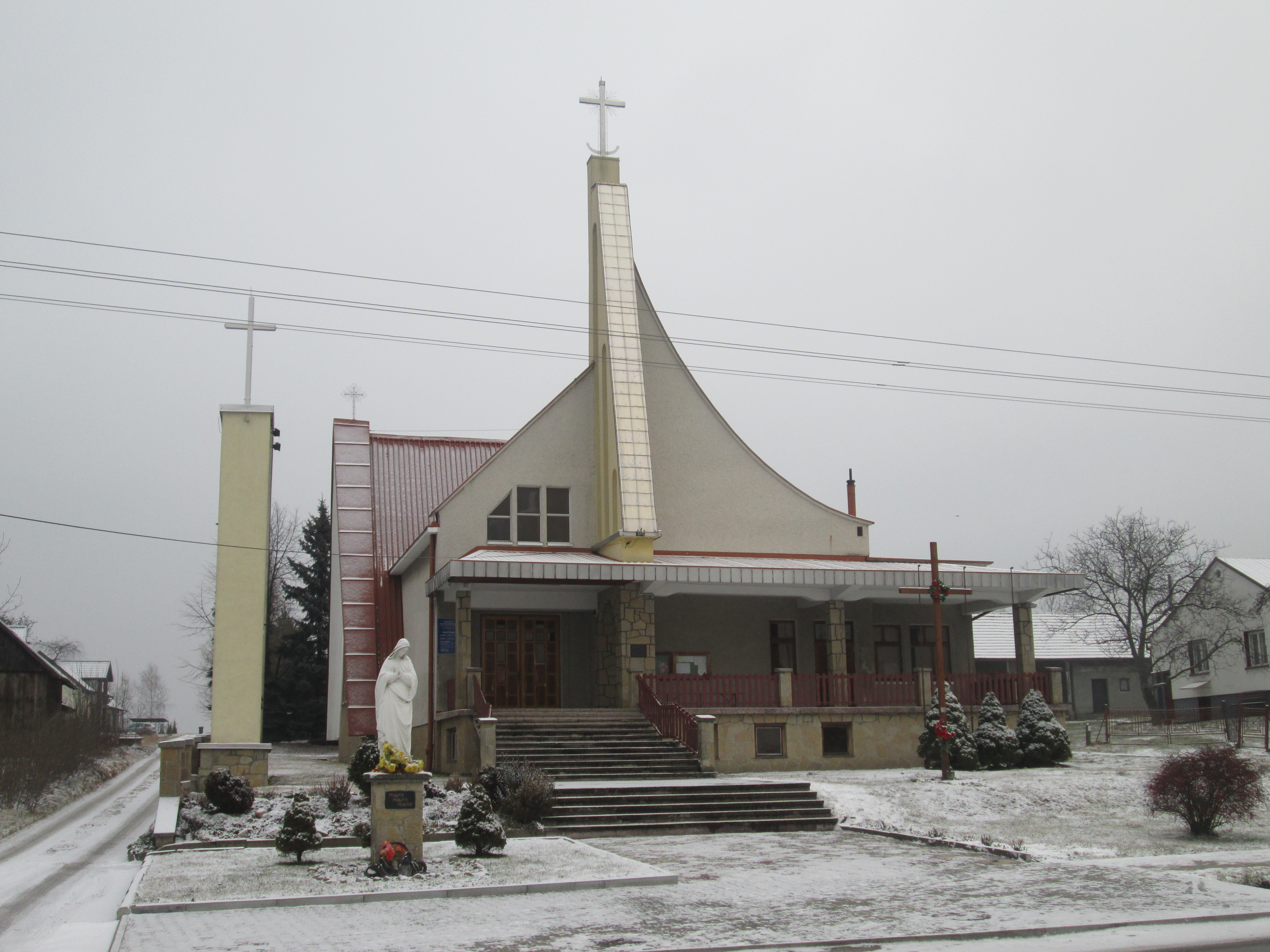
- Church of the Exaltation of the Holy Cross

- Location within Poland
- Coordinates: 50°4′N 21°44′E
- Country: Poland
- Voivodeship: Subcarpathian
- County: Ropczyce-Sędziszów
- Gmina: Sędziszów Małopolski
- Town: Sędziszów Małopolski
- Within town limits: 2019

Population
  - Total: 1,100
- Time zone: UTC+1 (CET)
  - Summer (DST): UTC+2 (CEST)
- Vehicle registration: RRS

Kawęczyn Sędziszowski [kaˈvɛnt͡ʂɨn sɛnd͡ʑiˈʂɔfski] is a neighbourhood of Sędziszów Małopolski, located in the eastern part of the town, in the administrative district of Gmina Sędziszów Małopolski, within Ropczyce-Sędziszów County, Subcarpathian Voivodeship, in south-eastern Poland.

Formerly an independent village, it was incorporated into the town limits of Sędziszów Małopolski effective 1 January 2019.
