= Krzywa, Podkarpackie Voivodeship =

Krzywa
- Village
- Location within Poland
- Coordinates: 50°6′5″N 21°44′9″E
- Country: Poland
- Voivodeship: Subcarpathian
- County: Ropczyce-Sędziszów
- Gmina: Sędziszów Małopolski
- Population: 1,000

Krzywa [ˈkʂɨva] is a village in the administrative district of Gmina Sędziszów Małopolski, within Ropczyce-Sędziszów County, Subcarpathian Voivodeship, in south-eastern Poland.
