= Mała =

- Village
- Location within Poland
- Coordinates: 49°57′N 21°30′E
- Country: Poland
- Voivodeship: Subcarpathian
- County: Ropczyce-Sędziszów
- Gmina: Ropczyce

Mała [ˈmawa] is a village in the administrative district of Gmina Ropczyce, within Ropczyce-Sędziszów County, Subcarpathian Voivodeship, in south-eastern Poland.
