= Lubzina =

- Village
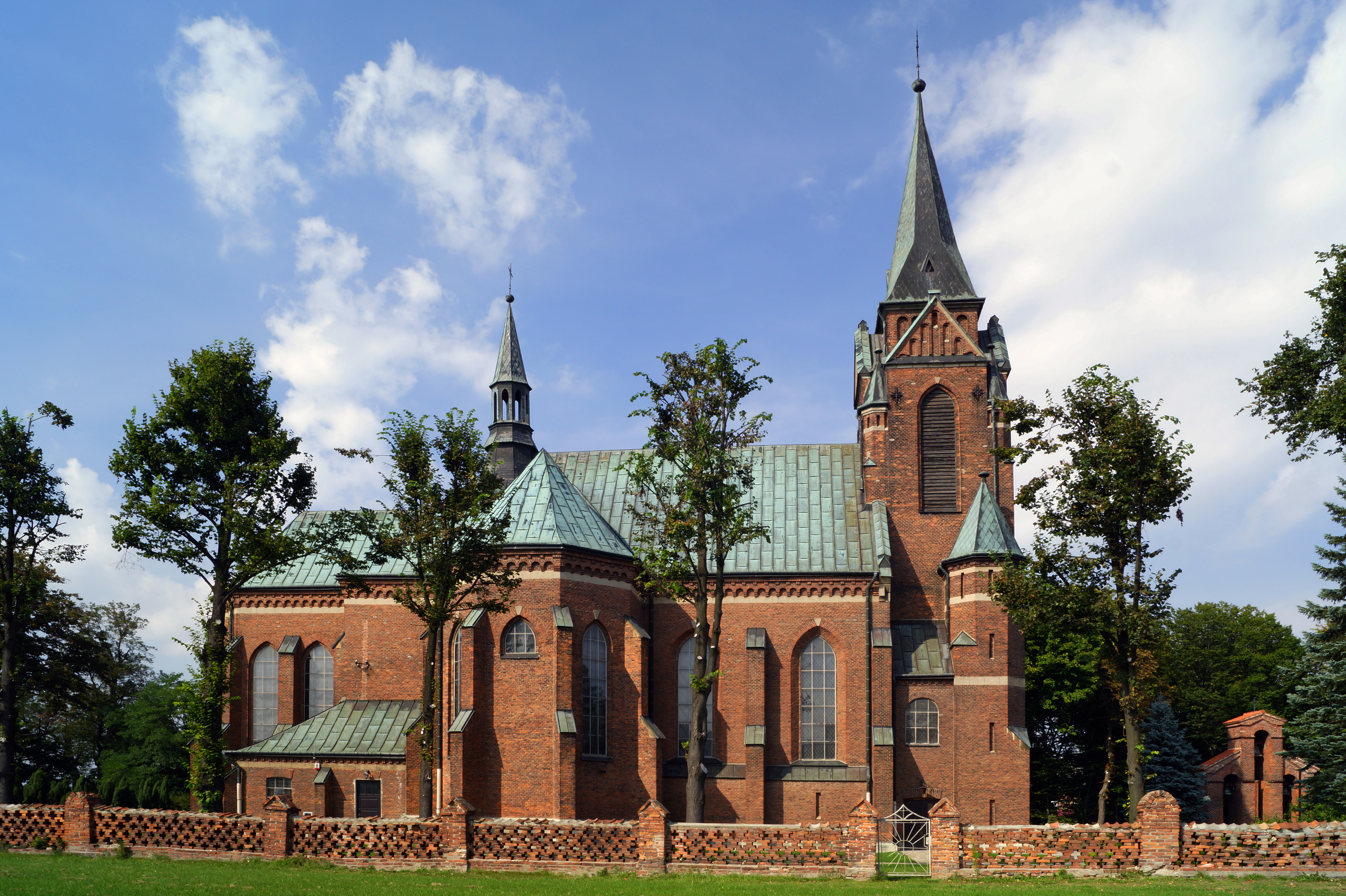
- Saint Nicholas church in Lubzina

- Location within Poland
- Coordinates: 50°3′N 21°31′E
- Country: Poland
- Voivodeship: Subcarpathian
- County: Ropczyce-Sędziszów
- Gmina: Ropczyce

Population
  - Total: 1,800
- Time zone: UTC+1 (CET)
  - Summer (DST): UTC+2 (CEST)
- Postal code: 39-102
- Vehicle registration: RRS

Lubzina [lubˈʑina] is a village in the administrative district of Gmina Ropczyce, within Ropczyce-Sędziszów County, Subcarpathian Voivodeship, in south-eastern Poland.

== History ==
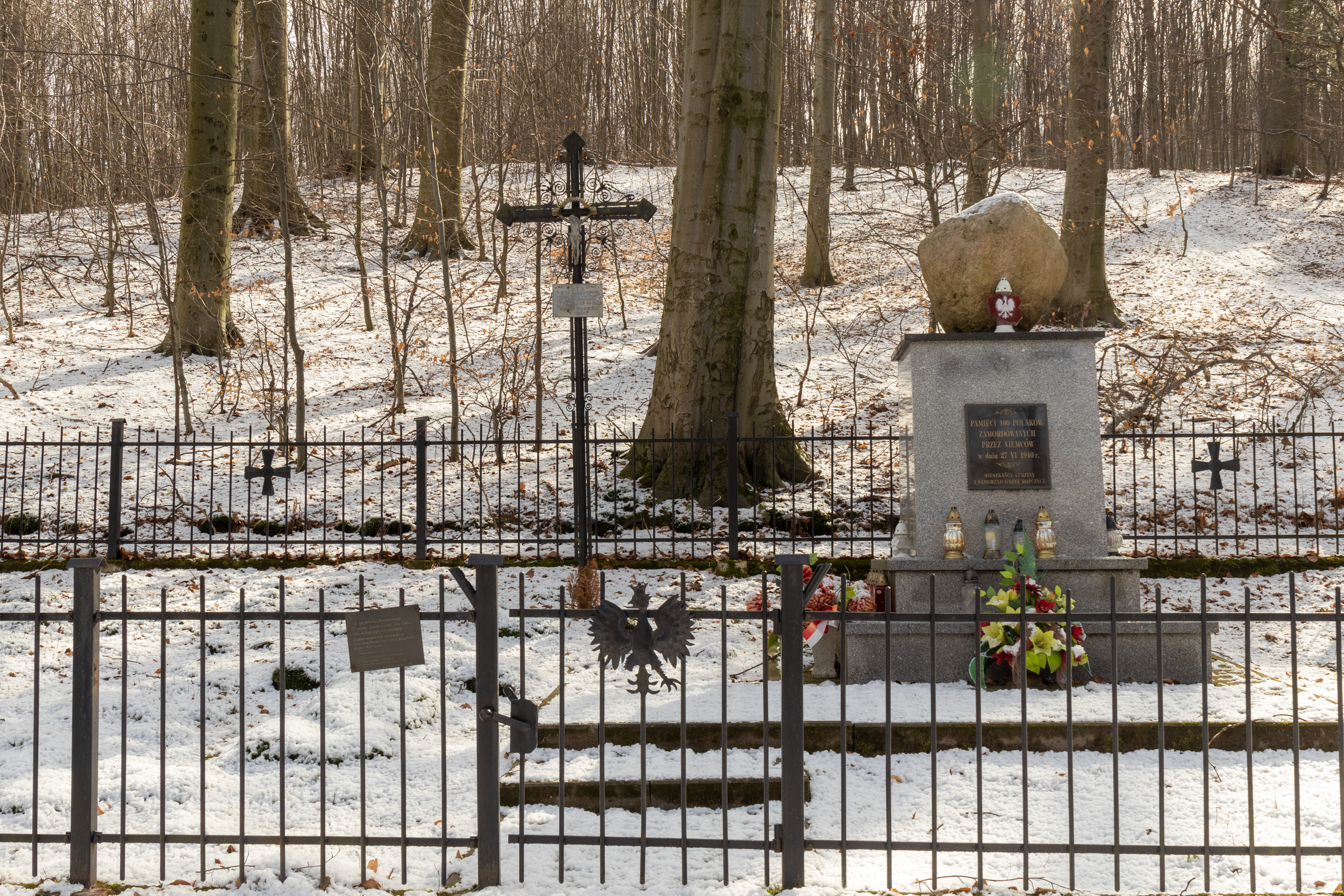
Grave of victims of the German-perpetrated massacre of 1940

The local Catholic parish was founded in 1222 by Janusz Ligęza from the Ligęza noble family. In the late 19th century, the village had a population of 287.

According to the 1921 census, the village had a population of 216, entirely Polish by nationality and 97.2% Roman Catholic by confession.

During the German occupation of Poland (World War II), the local forest was the site of a massacre of 104 Poles, including resistance members, committed by the occupiers on June 27, 1940, as part of the AB-Aktion.

== Transport ==
The Polish National road 94 runs through the village, and the A4 motorway (part of the European route E40) runs nearby, north of the village.

== Sports ==
The local football club is Strażak Lubzina. It competes in the lower leagues.
