= Będziemyśl =

- Village
- Location within Poland
- Coordinates: 50°3′N 21°47′E
- Country: Poland
- Voivodeship: Subcarpathian
- County: Ropczyce-Sędziszów
- Gmina: Sędziszów Małopolski
- Population: 1,032

Będziemyśl [bɛɲˈd͡ʑɛmɨɕl] is a village in the administrative district of Gmina Sędziszów Małopolski, within Ropczyce-Sędziszów County, Subcarpathian Voivodeship, in south-eastern Poland.
