= Gmina Iwierzyce =

Gmina Iwierzyce Iwierzyce Commune
- Gmina
- Interactive map of Gmina Iwierzyce
- Coordinates (Iwierzyce): 50°2′N 21°46′E
- Country: Poland
- Voivodeship: Subcarpathian
- County: Ropczyce-Sędziszów
- Seat: Iwierzyce

Area
  - Total: 65 km^{2} (25 sq mi)

Population (2006)
  - Total: 7,354
  - Density: 110/km^{2} (290/sq mi)
- Website: http://www.iwierzyce.pl/

Gmina Iwierzyce is a rural gmina (administrative district) in Ropczyce-Sędziszów County, Subcarpathian Voivodeship, in south-eastern Poland. Its seat is the village of Iwierzyce, which lies approximately 12 kilometres (7 mi) south-east of Ropczyce and 18 km (11 mi) west of the regional capital Rzeszów.

The gmina covers an area of 65.58 square kilometres (25.3 sq mi), and as of 2006 its total population is 7,354.

== Villages ==
Gmina Iwierzyce contains the villages and settlements of Będzienica, Bystrzyca, Iwierzyce, Nockowa, Olchowa, Olimpów, Sielec, Wiercany and Wiśniowa.

== Neighbouring gminas ==
Gmina Iwierzyce is bordered by the gminas of Boguchwała, Czudec, Sędziszów Małopolski, Świlcza and Wielopole Skrzyńskie.
