= Roman Sitko =

Polish Roman Catholic priest and martyr

Blessed Roman Sitko

Martyr
- Born: 30 March 1880; Czarna Sędziszowska, Poland
- Died: 12 October 1942 (aged 62); Auschwitz-Birkenau
- Beatified: 13 June 1999 by Pope John Paul II
- Feast: 12 October, 12 June (with the 108 Blessed Polish Martyrs)

Roman Sitko (30 March 1880 – 12 October 1942) was a Polish Catholic priest. In 1941 he was arrested by the Nazis and murdered at Auschwitz-Birkenau concentration camp. He is considered a martyr and was beatified by Pope John Paul II on 13 June 1999.

== Life ==
Roman Sitko was born on 30 March 1880 in Czarna Sędziszowska, Poland. In 1900 he started his studies for the priesthood and was ordained in Tarnów in 1904. Between 1907 and 1921 he worked as a priest in Mielec.

Sitko was arrested on 22 May 1941 by the Nazis. He was imprisoned for months before being sent to Auschwitz-Birkenau in August 1942.

== Veneration ==
After his murder Sitko was recognized as one of the 108 Martyrs of World War II. He was beatified by Pope John Paul II on 13 June 1999. His feast is celebrated on 12 October.

In 2014 a documentary was shot by a Polish screenplay writer, director and film producer Dawid Szpara.

== See also ==
- List of saints of Poland
- List of saints canonized by Pope John Paul II
