= Franciszek Piekosiński =

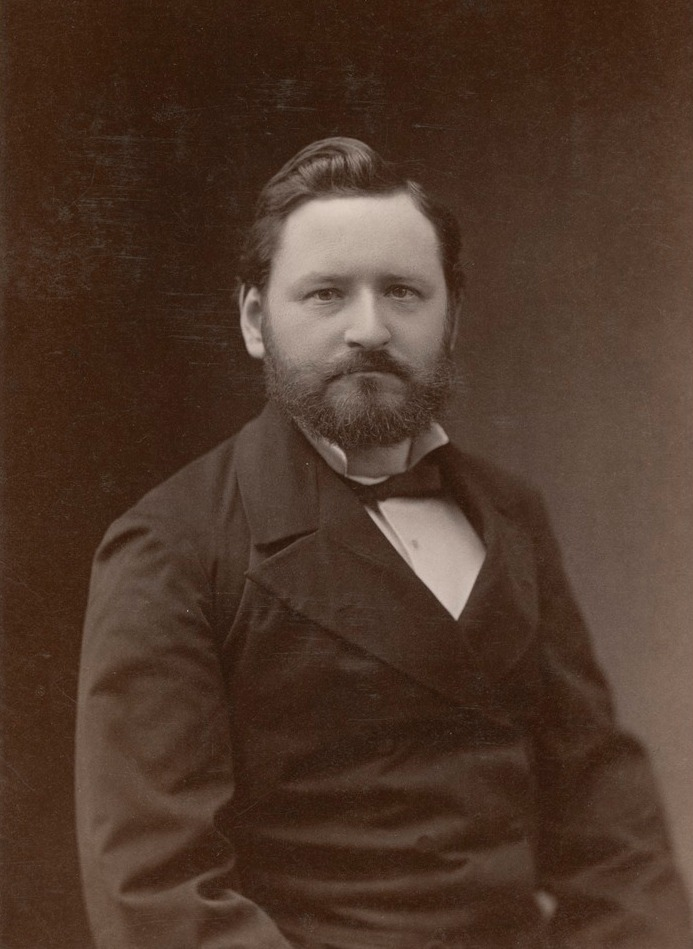
- Franciszek Piekosiński (1881)
- Born: February 3, 1844; Wiercany
- Died: November 27, 1906 (aged 62); Kraków
- Occupations: Historian, heraldist, lawyer

Franciszek Ksawery Walerian Leonard Adolf Pakosz Piekosiński, originally Piekusiński (3 February 1844 - 27 November 1906), was a Polish historian, heraldist, and lawyer. He was a professor at the Jagiellonian University and a member of the Academy of Learning.

== Biography ==
A medievalist historian, he was distinguished in the field of editing documents and monuments of Old Polish law. He was also a researcher of Polish heraldry, sigillography, filigranology, and numismatics, particularly of the Middle Ages. He served as the Director of the National Archives of Municipal and Land Records in Krakow in Kraków.

Piekosiński was the author of a hypothesis concerning the runic origin of Polish coats of arms. Based on his analysis of Ruthenian heraldry, he argued that because Ruthenian heraldry is incomparably richer in these types of arms than its Polish counterpart, it could serve as a primary basis for detailed comparative research.

He was buried at the Rakowicki Cemetery in Kraków.
