= Nockowa =

- Village
- Location within Poland
- Coordinates: 50°1′N 21°47′E
- Country: Poland
- Voivodeship: Subcarpathian
- County: Ropczyce-Sędziszów
- Gmina: Iwierzyce
- Population: 1,200

Nockowa [nɔt͡sˈkɔva] is a village in the administrative district of Gmina Iwierzyce, within Ropczyce-Sędziszów County, Subcarpathian Voivodeship, in south-eastern Poland.

It is the hometown of Pieczone pierogi św. Jacka ("baked pierogi of St. Hyacinth"), recognized by the Polish government as a traditional product.
