= Borek Wielki =

- Village
- Location within Poland
- Coordinates: 50°6′N 21°40′E
- Country: Poland
- Voivodeship: Subcarpathian
- County: Ropczyce-Sędziszów
- Gmina: Sędziszów Małopolski
- Population: 2,000
- Website: https://web.archive.org/web/20081001213614/http://borek-wielki.pl/

Borek Wielki (Polish pronunciation: [ˈbɔrɛk ˈfjɛlkʲi]) is a village in the administrative district of Gmina Sędziszów Małopolski, within Ropczyce-Sędziszów County, Subcarpathian Voivodeship, in south-eastern Poland.
