= Cierpisz, Ropczyce-Sędziszów County =

Cierpisz
- Village
- Location within Poland
- Coordinates: 50°8′44″N 21°43′2″E
- Country: Poland
- Voivodeship: Subcarpathian
- County: Ropczyce-Sędziszów
- Gmina: Sędziszów Małopolski

Cierpisz [ˈt͡ɕɛrpiʂ] is a village in the administrative district of Gmina Sędziszów Małopolski, within Ropczyce-Sędziszów County, Subcarpathian Voivodeship, in south-eastern Poland.
