= Wielopole Skrzyńskie =

- Village
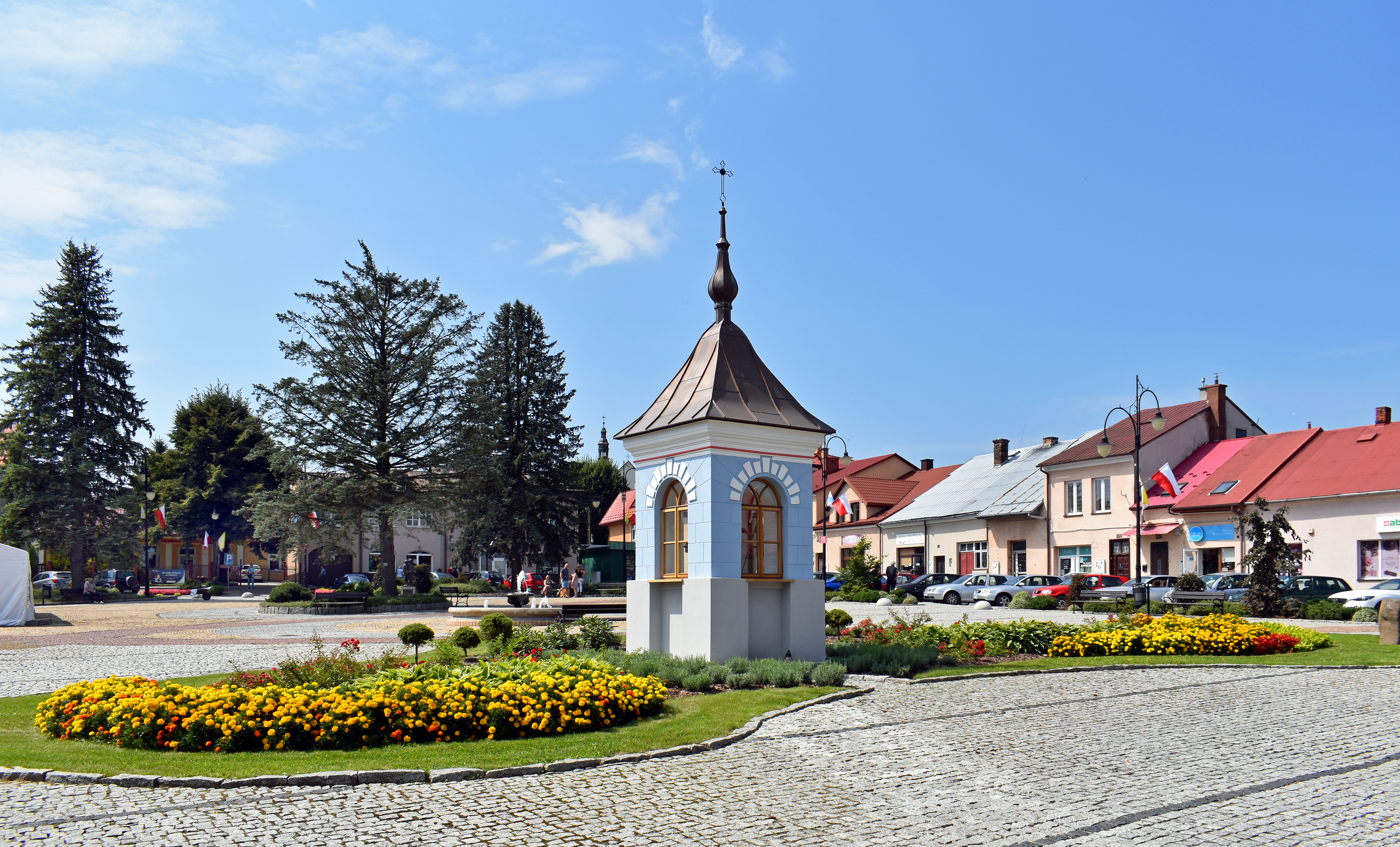
- Market Square

- Coat of arms

- Location within Poland
- Coordinates: 49°57′N 21°37′E
- Country: Poland
- Voivodeship: Subcarpathian
- County: Ropczyce-Sędziszów
- Gmina: Wielopole Skrzyńskie
- Population: 3,982
- Vehicle registration: RRS

Wielopole Skrzyńskie (Note: [vjɛlɔˈpɔlɛ ˈskʂɨɲskʲɛ] Yiddish: וילופולה, romanized: Vyelipol) is a village in Ropczyce-Sędziszów County, Subcarpathian Voivodeship, in south-eastern Poland. It is the seat of the gmina (administrative district) called Gmina Wielopole Skrzyńskie.

== History ==
The history of Wielopole dates back to the 12th century, when it was a defensive gord, located on a hill called Stroszowa Góra, among the forests near the border between Lesser Poland and Red Ruthenia. It was first mentioned in 1124, in a document of papal legate Gilles de Paris. In 1266 Ruthenian Prince Swarno, supported by Lithuanians and Tatars, raided Eastern Lesser Poland, burning Wielopole to the ground. The village received Magdeburg rights in c. 1348, and at that time it was called Fuerstenberg, due to the fact that most of its inhabitants were the Walddeutsche. The town was located on a merchant route from Sandomierz, through Ropczyce, towards the Kingdom of Hungary, and until the late 14th century, it was property of the Bishopric of Lubusz.

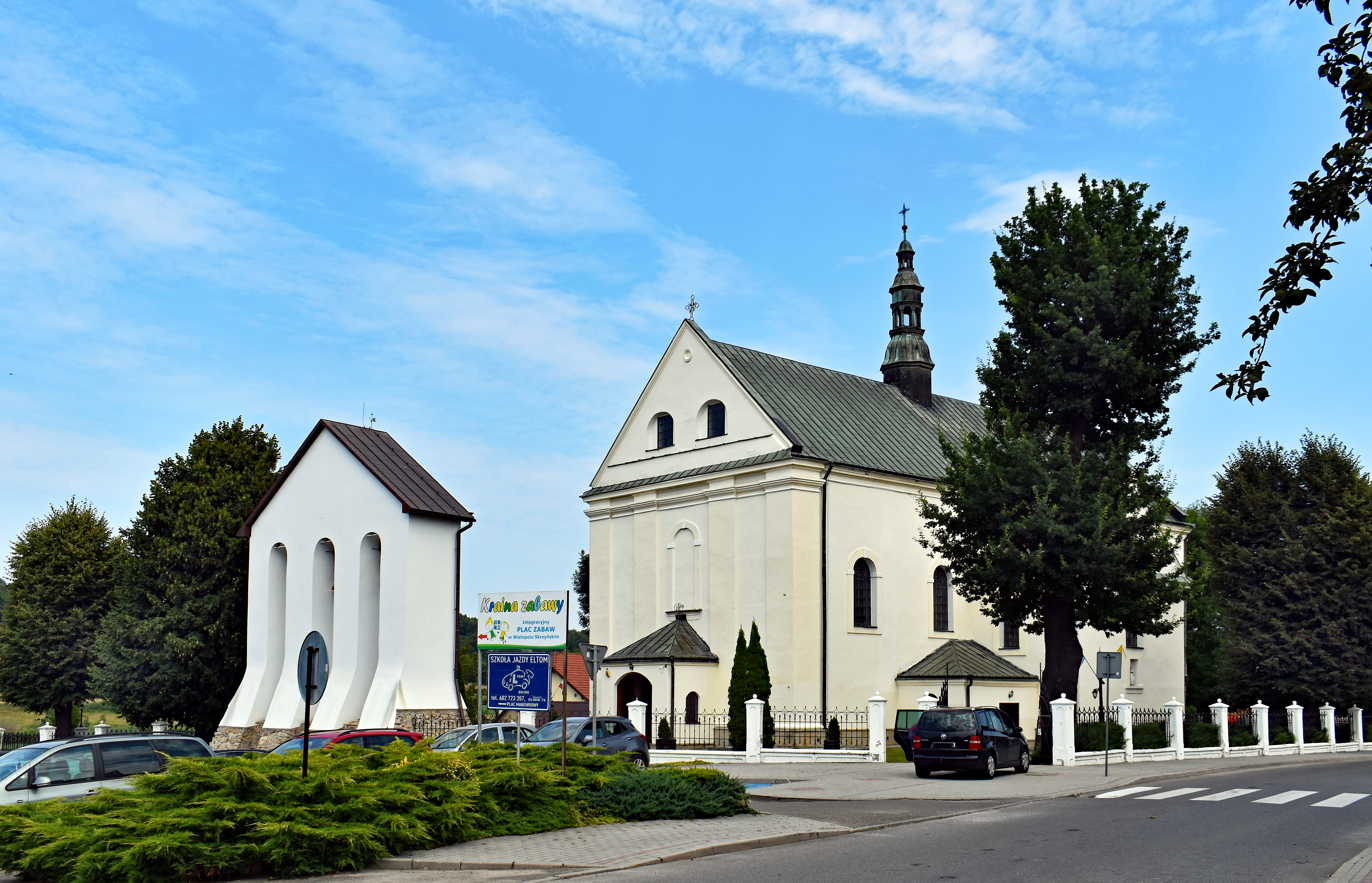
Historic Church of the Assumption

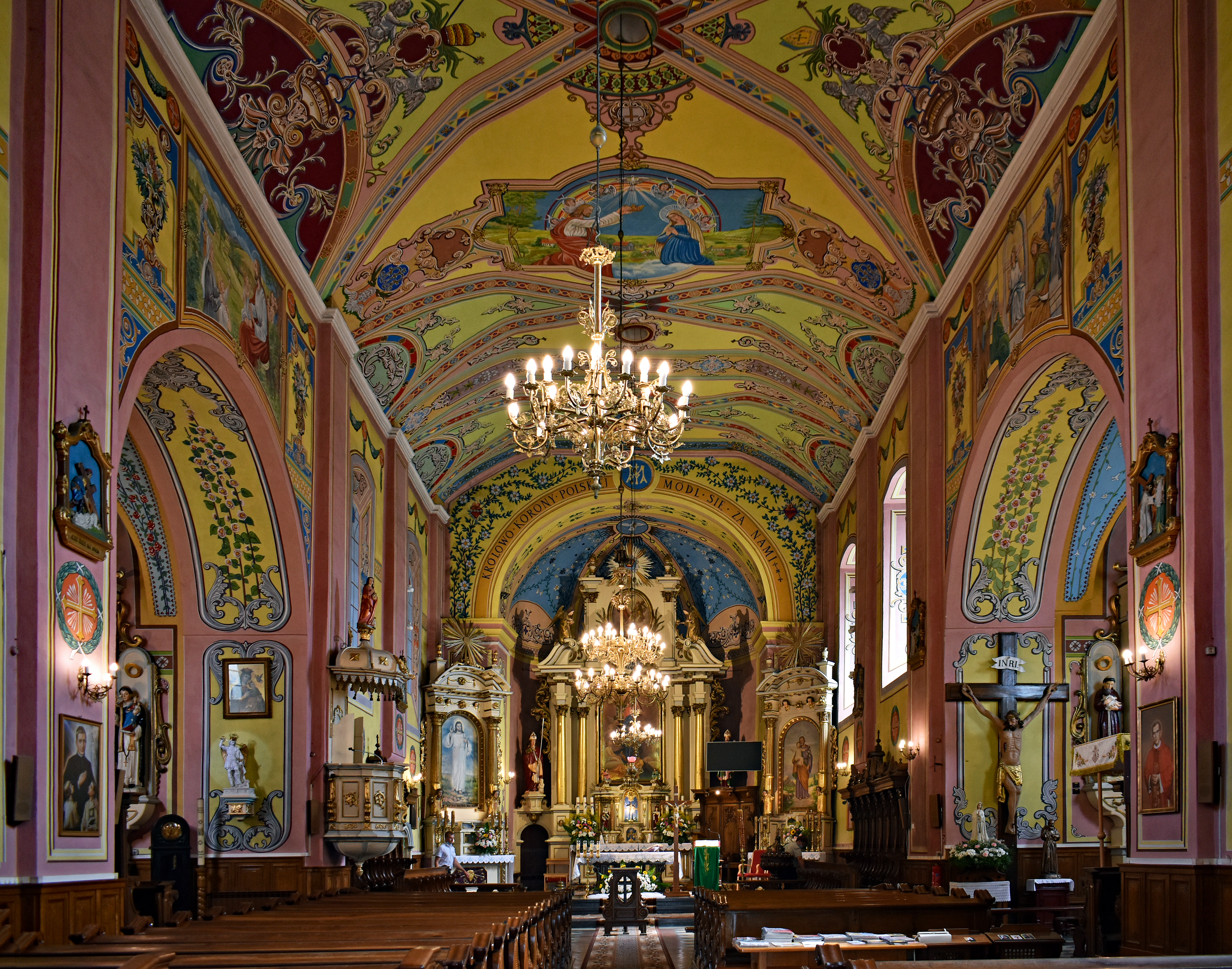
Interior of the church

In 1325, Wielopole already had a parish church of St. Mary. The town remained in private hands; after the Bishopric of Lebus, its owners were the Kamieniecki family, the Frysztacki family (1492 - 1518), and the Maciejowski family. In the late 15th century, 111 families resided in Wielopole, with a few artisans. In the first half of the 16th century, town’s owner Kacper Maciejowski began to invest in Wielopole, building a Renaissance castle. The town however did not emerge as an important trade center. It was administratively located in the Sandomierz Voivodeship in the Lesser Poland Province. Its situation deteriorated after the Swedish invasion of Poland, when both Swedish and Transilvanian armies of George II Rakoczi burned and ransacked it. In the 18th century, Wielopole declined further, and following the Partitions of Poland, it found itself in Austrian Galicia.

By the early 19th century, half of Wielopole’s residents were Jewish. In 1806, an epidemic of cholera killed 92, and in 1833, Wielopole burned in a fire. During the Galician slaughter, a gang of peasants entered the castle, murdering several noblemen gathered there. In the mid-19th century, Wielopole belonged to Borgiasz de Zaręba Skrzyński, after whom the adjective Skrzyńskie was added to the name. It remained a small, provincial town, without rail transport, as Galician Railway of Archduke Charles Louis goes some 15 kilometers to the north.

On September 24, 1914, Wielopole was captured by the Russian Imperial Army. The Russians retreated after two weeks, to return in October 1915. In May 1915, during the Gorlice–Tarnów Offensive, Wielopole was seized by the Austrians. World War I resulted in widespread destruction and poverty of local population. Wielopole did not recover in the Second Polish Republic, and in 1933, its town charter was taken away. Since then, it has been a village. An unusual color film taken by a man who immigrated to America but visited Wielopole, his hometown, in 1938 can be found here.

The Jewish population of Wielopole Skrzynskie numbered around 500 at the time of the German occupation in 1939. They were deported to slave labor camps, shot on site in Wielopole, and in August 1942 most were deported to the Belzec extermination camp where they were murdered on arrival. Very few of Wielopole's Jews survived the war and Holocaust. In August 1944, the village was partially destroyed.

On 11 May 1955, in a wooden shack fire during cinema projection, 58 people (including 36 children) perished, the worst one-day death toll in Polish post-war history. This tragedy was commemorated by a monument, which stands in Wielopole’s market square.

== Sights ==
Among points of interest there are: Baroque parish church (1683), with a bell tower, early 19th century roadside chapel in the market square, 19th century wooden houses, ruins of defensive wall, and cemeteries.

== Notable people ==
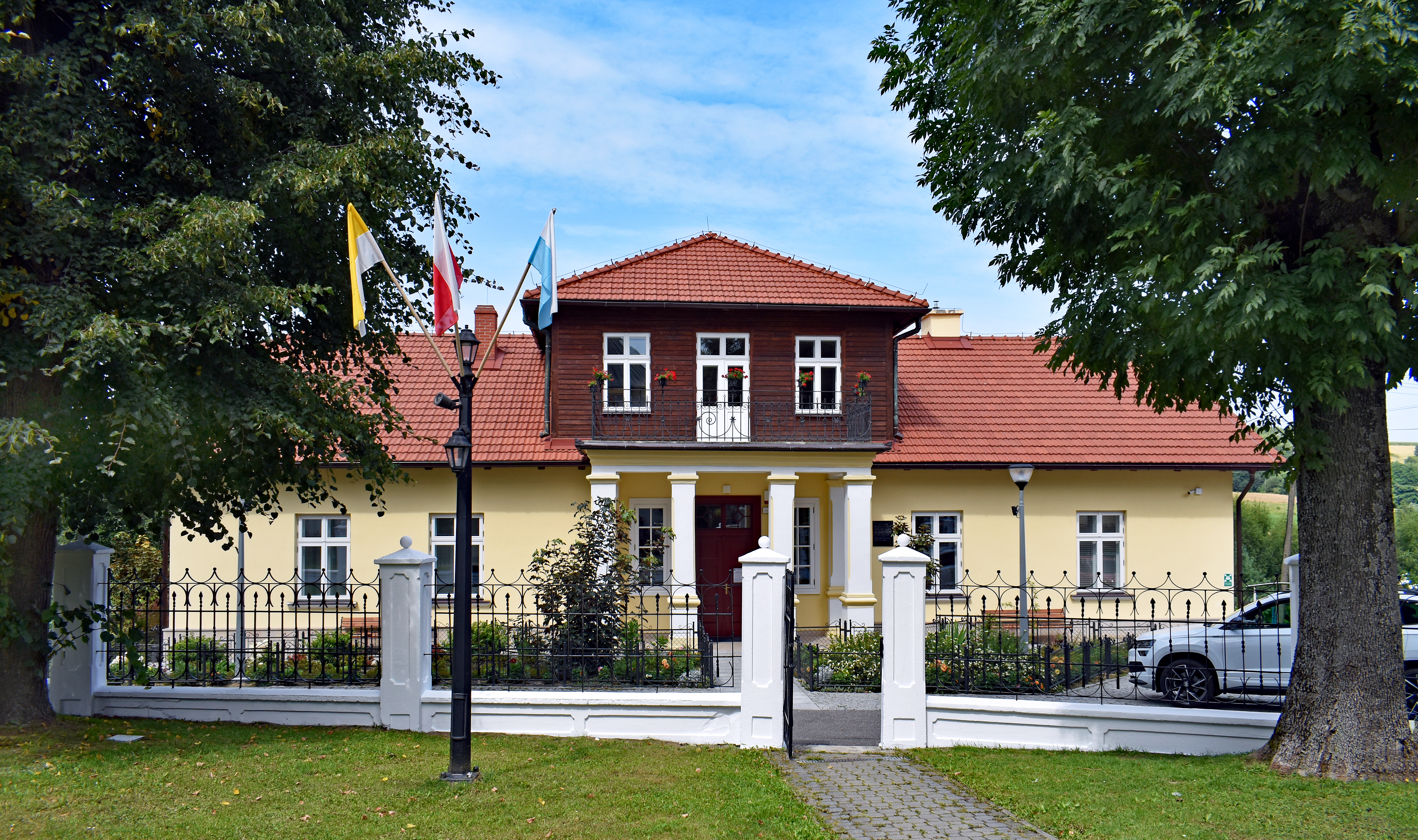
The Old Rectory and the birthplace of Tadeusz Kantor.

- Tadeusz Kantor, a Polish painter, assemblage artist, set designer and theatre director, was born here
- Marcin Daniec, popular stand-up comedian was born here
