= Okonin =

Okonin may refer to the following places:

- Okonin, Grudziądz County in Kuyavian-Pomeranian Voivodeship (north-central Poland)
- Okonin, Rypin County in Kuyavian-Pomeranian Voivodeship (north-central Poland)
- Okonin, Subcarpathian Voivodeship (south-east Poland)
