= Klęczany =

Klęczany may refer to:

- Klęczany, Gorlice County in Lesser Poland Voivodeship (south Poland)
- Klęczany, Nowy Sącz County in Lesser Poland Voivodeship (south Poland)
- Klęczany, Subcarpathian Voivodeship (south-east Poland)
