= Będzienica =

- Village
- Location within Poland
- Coordinates: 50°0′N 21°47′E
- Country: Poland
- Voivodeship: Subcarpathian
- County: Ropczyce-Sędziszów
- Gmina: Iwierzyce

Będzienica [bɛnd͡ʑɛˈnit͡sa] is a village in the administrative district of Gmina Iwierzyce, within Ropczyce-Sędziszów County, Subcarpathian Voivodeship, in south-eastern Poland.
