= Brzezówka, Ropczyce-Sędziszów County =

Brzezówka
- Village
- Location within Poland
- Coordinates: 50°4′14″N 21°32′56″E
- Country: Poland
- Voivodeship: Subcarpathian
- County: Ropczyce-Sędziszów
- Gmina: Ropczyce
- Population: 1,138

Brzezówka [bʐɛˈzufka] is a village in the administrative district of Gmina Ropczyce, within Ropczyce-Sędziszów County, Subcarpathian Voivodeship, in south-eastern Poland.
