= Zagorzyce, Podkarpackie Voivodeship =

Zagorzyce
- Village
- Location within Poland
- Coordinates: 50°1′14″N 21°40′42″E
- Country: Poland
- Voivodeship: Subcarpathian
- County: Ropczyce-Sędziszów
- Gmina: Sędziszów Małopolski
- Population: 10

Zagorzyce [zaɡɔˈʐɨt͡sɛ] is a village in the administrative district of Gmina Sędziszów Małopolski, within Ropczyce-Sędziszów County, Subcarpathian Voivodeship, in south-eastern Poland.
