= Niedźwiada, Podkarpackie Voivodeship =

Niedźwiada
- Village
- Location within Poland
- Coordinates: 49°59′20″N 21°31′1″E
- Country: Poland
- Voivodeship: Subcarpathian
- County: Ropczyce-Sędziszów
- Gmina: Ropczyce

Niedźwiada [ɲɛd͡ʑˈvjada] is a village in the administrative district of Gmina Ropczyce, within Ropczyce-Sędziszów County, Subcarpathian Voivodeship, in south-eastern Poland.
