= Nawsie =

- Village
- Location within Poland
- Coordinates: 49°56′N 21°39′E
- Country: Poland
- Voivodeship: Subcarpathian
- County: Ropczyce-Sędziszów
- Gmina: Wielopole Skrzyńskie

Population
  - Total: 1,599
- Time zone: UTC+1 (CET)
  - Summer (DST): UTC+2 (CEST)
- Vehicle registration: RRS

Nawsie [ˈnafɕɛ] is a village in the administrative district of Gmina Wielopole Skrzyńskie, within Ropczyce-Sędziszów County, Subcarpathian Voivodeship, in south-eastern Poland.

Five Polish citizens were murdered by Nazi Germany in the village during World War II.
