= Stanisław Baran =

Polish footballer (1920–1993)

Personal information
- Full name: Stanisław Franciszek Baran
- Date of birth: 26 April 1920
- Place of birth: Góra Ropczycka, Poland
- Date of death: 12 May 1993 (aged 73)
- Place of death: Łódź, Poland
- Height: 1.72 m (5 ft 7 1/2 in)
- Position: Forward

Senior career*
Years	Team	Apps	(Gls)
1934–1937	Resovia Rzeszów		
1937–1939	KS Warszawianka	25	(9)
1945	Lechia Gdańsk	8	(17)
1946–1958	ŁKS Łódź	178	(70)

International career
1939–1950	Poland	9	(0)

Managerial career
- 1961–1962: ŁKS Łódź
- Włókniarz Łódź
- Orzeł Łódź
- Włókniarz Pabianice
- Wisłoka Dębica
- Radomiak Radom
- Pilica Tomaszów Mazowiecki
- * Club domestic league appearances and goals

Stanisław Franciszek Baran (26 April 1920 – 12 May 1993) was a Polish footballer who played as a forward. He started his career in Resovia Rzeszów, then, sometime in 1938 (at the age of around 18) moved to KS Warszawianka. Regarded as one of the most gifted players of these times, World War II stopped his career for a few years.

Baran was a member of the Poland national team at the 1938 FIFA World Cup, but did not play in Poland's 5–6 loss to Brazil on 5 June 1938 in Strasbourg – he spent the whole match on the bench. He played in the last international friendly of interwar Poland, a 4–2 win over Hungary on 27 August 1939 in Warsaw. In this game, he appeared on the field as a substitute in 31st minute.

In 1958, as a 38-year-old footballing veteran, Baran won the Polish title with ŁKS Łódź.

== Honours ==
ŁKS Łódź

- Ekstraklasa: 1958
- Polish Cup: 1956–57

== See also ==
- The last game: August 27, 1939. Poland - Hungary 4-2
