= Okonin, Podkarpackie Voivodeship =

Okonin
- Village
- Location within Poland
- Coordinates: 50°2′7″N 21°33′18″E
- Country: Poland
- Voivodeship: Subcarpathian
- County: Ropczyce-Sędziszów
- Gmina: Ropczyce
- Population: 440

Okonin [ɔˈkɔnin] is a village in the administrative district of Gmina Ropczyce, within Ropczyce-Sędziszów County, Subcarpathian Voivodeship, in south-eastern Poland.
