= Gmina Ropczyce =

Gmina Ropczyce Ropczyce Commune
- Gmina
- Coat of arms
- Interactive map of Gmina Ropczyce
- Coordinates (Ropczyce): 50°3′10″N 21°36′33″E
- Country: Poland
- Voivodeship: Subcarpathian
- County: Ropczyce-Sędziszów
- Seat: Ropczyce

Area
  - Total: 139 km^{2} (54 sq mi)

Population (2006)
  - Total: 26,008
  - Density: 187/km^{2} (485/sq mi)
  - Urban: 15,045
  - Rural: 10,963
- Website: http://www.ropczyce.itl.pl/

Gmina Ropczyce is an urban-rural gmina (administrative district) in Ropczyce-Sędziszów County, Subcarpathian Voivodeship, in south-eastern Poland. Its seat is the town of Ropczyce, which lies approximately 28 kilometres (17 mi) west of the regional capital Rzeszów.

The gmina covers an area of 138.99 square kilometres (53.7 sq mi), and as of 2006 its total population is 26,008 (out of which the population of Ropczyce amounts to 15,045, and the population of the rural part of the gmina is 10,963).

== Villages ==
Apart from the town of Ropczyce, Gmina Ropczyce contains the villages and settlements of Brzezówka, Gnojnica, Łączki Kucharskie, Lubzina, Mała, Niedźwiada and Okonin.

== Neighbouring gminas ==
Gmina Ropczyce is bordered by the gminas of Brzostek, Dębica, Ostrów, Sędziszów Małopolski and Wielopole Skrzyńskie.
