= Sławomir Kłosowski =

Polish politician (born 1964)

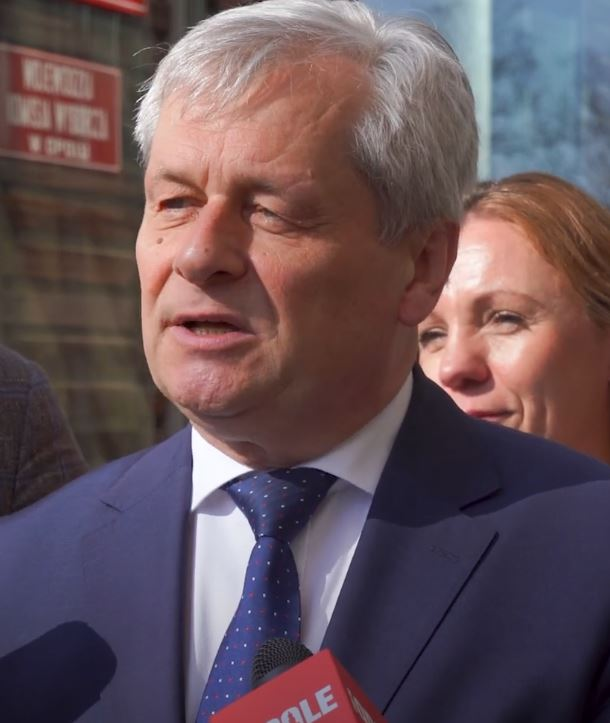

Voivode of Opole Voivodeship
- In office March 2021 – December 2023
- President: Andrzej Duda
- Prime Minister: Mateusz Morawiecki
- Preceded by: Adrian Czubak
- Succeeded by: Monika Jurek

Member of the European Parliament
- In office 2015–2019

Member of the Sejm

Member of the European Parliament for Lower Silesian and Opole
- In office 2005–2015
- Constituency: 21-Opole

Personal details
- Born: 21 February 1964 (age 62)
- Party: Law and Justice
- Education: Pedagogical University of Opole
- Awards: Badge of Honor for Merit to Environmental Protection and Climate

Sławomir Kłosowski (born 21 February 1964 in Wambierzyce) is a Polish politician. He was elected to the Sejm on 25 September 2005, getting 17,894 votes in 21 Opole district as a candidate from the Law and Justice list. From 2021 to 2023 he served as Voivode of Opole Voivodeship.

== Biography ==
He graduated with a degree in history from the Pedagogical University of Opole in 1988, and completed postgraduate studies in local government and local economy at the University of Wrocław in 1992 and in management and entrepreneurship in education at the University of Economics in Katowice in 2000. He worked as a history and social studies teacher. He was secretary of the regional council of the Opole Silesia Solidarity Electoral Action. During Jerzy Buzek's government, he served as the Opole education superintendent. He was a member of the AWS Social Movement, and then of the Right Alliance, joining the Law and Justice party in 2002. For several years, until 2005, he served as a councilor on the Opole City Council.

In March 2021, he was appointed Voivode of the Opole Voivodeship by Prime Minister Mateusz Morawiecki. In 2023, he unsuccessfully ran for a parliamentary seat again. In December of the same year, he ended his term as voivode. In 2024, he was elected a councilor of the 7th term of the Opole Voivodeship Sejmik.

== See also ==
- Members of Polish Sejm 2005-2007
