= Brzeziny, Podkarpackie Voivodeship =

Brzeziny
- Village
- Location within Poland
- Coordinates: 49°55′52″N 21°31′16″E
- Country: Poland
- Voivodeship: Subcarpathian
- County: Ropczyce-Sędziszów
- Gmina: Wielopole Skrzyńskie

Brzeziny [bʐɛˈʑinɨ] is a village in the administrative district of Gmina Wielopole Skrzyńskie, within Ropczyce-Sędziszów County, Subcarpathian Voivodeship, in south-eastern Poland.
