= Klęczany, Podkarpackie Voivodeship =

Klęczany
- Village
- Location within Poland
- Coordinates: 50°4′29″N 21°47′50″E
- Country: Poland
- Voivodeship: Subcarpathian
- County: Ropczyce-Sędziszów
- Gmina: Sędziszów Małopolski
- Population: 1,500

Klęczany [klɛnˈt͡ʂanɨ] is a village in the administrative district of Gmina Sędziszów Małopolski, within Ropczyce-Sędziszów County, Subcarpathian Voivodeship, in south-eastern Poland.
