= Czarna Sędziszowska =

- Village
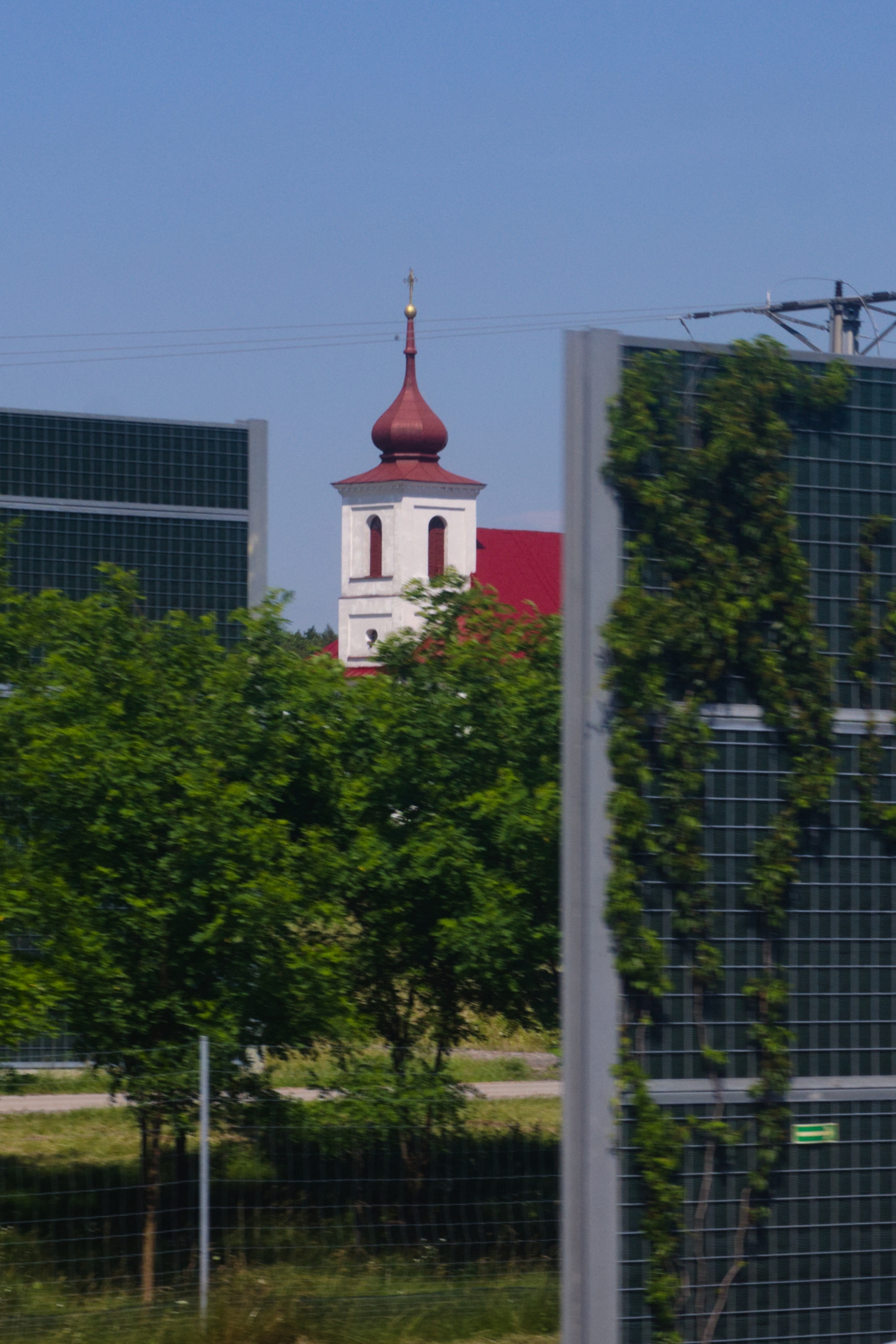
- Church in Czarna Sędziszowska (2020)

- Location within Poland
- Coordinates: 50°7′32″N 21°45′11″E
- Country: Poland
- Voivodeship: Subcarpathian
- County: Ropczyce-Sędziszów
- Gmina: Sędziszów Małopolski
- Population: 1,300

Czarna Sędziszowska [ˈt͡ʂarna sɛnd͡ʑiˈʂɔfska] is a village in the administrative district of Gmina Sędziszów Małopolski, within Ropczyce-Sędziszów County, Subcarpathian Voivodeship, in south-eastern Poland.
