= Yarmolinsky =

Yarmolinsky (feminine Yarmolinskaya) is an East Slavic surname (Russian Ярмолинский, Ukrainian Ярмолинські). The Polish-language versions are Jarmoliński/Jarmolińska. Notable people with this surname include:

- Avrahm Yarmolinsky (1890-1975), Ukrainian author
- Adam Yarmolinsky (1922-2000), American academic
