= Boreczek, Podkarpackie Voivodeship =

Boreczek
- Village
- Location within Poland
- Coordinates: 50°7′0″N 21°41′50″E
- Country: Poland
- Voivodeship: Subcarpathian
- County: Ropczyce-Sędziszów
- Gmina: Sędziszów Małopolski

Boreczek [bɔˈrɛt͡ʂɛk] is a village in the administrative district of Gmina Sędziszów Małopolski, within Ropczyce-Sędziszów County, Subcarpathian Voivodeship, in south-eastern Poland.
