= Iwierzyce =

- Village
- Location within Poland
- Coordinates: 50°2′N 21°46′E
- Country: Poland
- Voivodeship: Subcarpathian
- County: Ropczyce-Sędziszów
- Gmina: Iwierzyce
- Population: 940

Iwierzyce [ivjɛˈʐɨt͡sɛ] is a village in Ropczyce-Sędziszów County, Subcarpathian Voivodeship, in south-eastern Poland. It is the seat of the gmina (administrative district) called Gmina Iwierzyce.
