= Sielec, Podkarpackie Voivodeship =

Sielec
- Village
- Location within Poland
- Coordinates: 50°3′N 21°44′E
- Country: Poland
- Voivodeship: Subcarpathian
- County: Ropczyce-Sędziszów
- Gmina: Iwierzyce

Sielec [ˈɕɛlɛt͡s] is a village in the administrative district of Gmina Iwierzyce, within Ropczyce-Sędziszów County, Subcarpathian Voivodeship, in south-eastern Poland.
