= Wiercany =

- Village
- Location within Poland
- Coordinates: 50°1′N 21°45′E
- Country: Poland
- Voivodeship: Subcarpathian
- County: Ropczyce-Sędziszów
- Gmina: Iwierzyce
- Time zone: UTC+1 (CET)
  - Summer (DST): UTC+2 (CEST)

Wiercany [vjɛrˈt͡sanɨ] is a village in the administrative district of Gmina Iwierzyce, within Ropczyce-Sędziszów County, Subcarpathian Voivodeship, in south-eastern Poland.

Five Polish citizens were murdered by Nazi Germany in the village during World War II.
