= Józef Rojek =

Polish politician (born 1950)

Mayor of Tarnów (1998-2002), member of the Sejm (2005–2006 and 2007–2015)

Personal details
- Born: 20 March 1950 (age 76) Ropczyce
- Party: Law and Justice

Józef Rojek (born 20 March 1950 in Ropczyce) is a Polish politician and local government official.

Rojek was elected to the Sejm on 25 September 2005, getting 13,409 votes in 15 Tarnów district as a candidate from the Law and Justice list.

On 12 November 2006, Rojek ran for mayor of Tarnów but was unsuccessful. He was, however, elected to the Tarnów town council. Article 177 of the Polish election law says that A Sejm mandate expires if a deputy takes a position that is legally incompatible. As such, Rojek had to give up his post in the Sejm.

Rojek initially stated in an interview with the Polish Press Agency (PAP) that he did not intend to relinquish his seat, but ultimately lost his mandate following his election to the city council and his seat was taken by the next candidate on the party list.

Rojek served as Mayor of Tarnów from 1998 to 2002, and was a member of the Sejm during its 5th, 6th and 7th terms (2005–2006 and 2007–2015).

== See also ==
- Members of Polish Sejm 2005-2007
