= Góra Ropczycka =

- Village
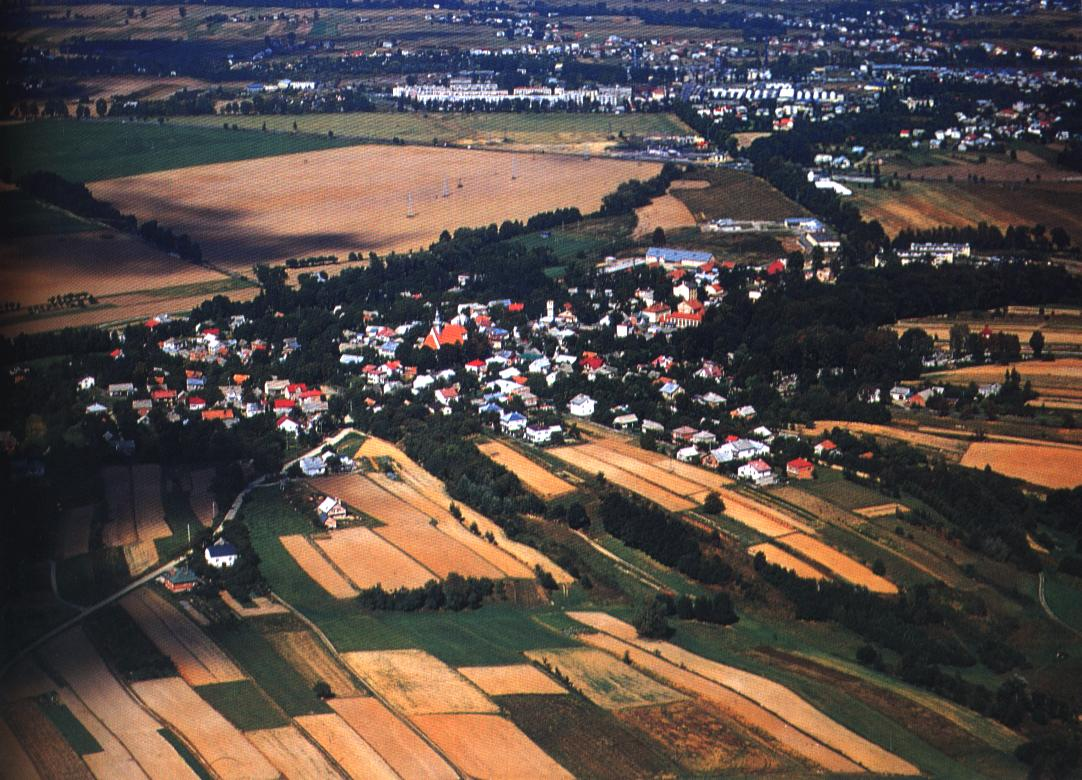
- Aerial view

- Location within Poland
- Coordinates: 50°3′10″N 21°40′53″E
- Country: Poland
- Voivodeship: Subcarpathian
- County: Ropczyce-Sędziszów
- Gmina: Sędziszów Małopolski
- Population: 1,800

Góra Ropczycka [ˈɡura rɔpˈt͡ʂɨt͡ska] is a village in the administrative district of Gmina Sędziszów Małopolski, within Ropczyce-Sędziszów County, Subcarpathian Voivodeship, in south-eastern Poland.
