= Christof Sielecki =

German chess player

Personal information
- Born: May 24, 1974 (age 52)

Chess career
- Country: Germany
- Title: International Master
- Peak rating: 2451 (December 2014)

Christof Sielecki (born May 24, 1974) is a German chess International Master (IM) from Dinslaken, author of chess books, and YouTuber.

He regularly participates in Banter Blitz on the YouTube channel of Chess24.com under the username Chessexplained. He speaks German and English. Sielecki reached his highest Elo rating of 2451 in December 2014 and again in March 2015.

== Bibliography ==
- Christof Sielecki: Nimzo and Bogo Indian - Opening Repertoire, Everyman Chess, London, 2015, ISBN 978-1781941096
- Christof Sielecki: Keep it Simple 1.e4, New in Chess, Alkmaar, 2018, ISBN 978-90-5691-805-7
