= Stanisław Jarmoliński =

Polish politician and physician

Stanislaw Jarmoliński (born 11 July 1944 in Ropczyce) is a Polish politician and physician. He was a member of Polish Sejm Fourth Term from 2001 to 2005.

He graduated in 1968 from the Faculty of Medicine Medical Academy in Kraków, specializing in the field of obstetrics and gynecology. He joined the Polish United Workers' Party and became a physician.

He held the mandate of Fourth Term for the Nowy Sącz constituency as a member of the Democratic Left Alliance party.

== See also ==
- List of Polish United Workers' Party members
