= Monika Jurek =

Polish politician

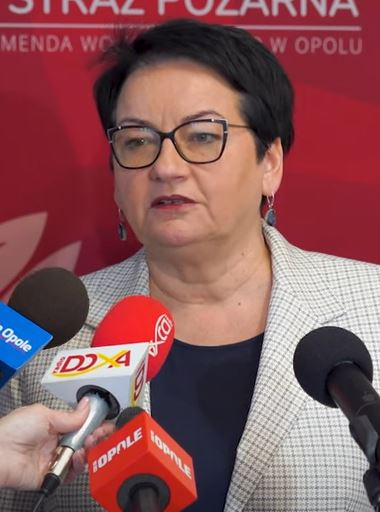
- Jurek in 2025

Voivode of Opole Voivodeship
- Incumbent
- Assumed office December 2023
- President: Andrzej Duda; Karol Nawrocki
- Prime Minister: Donald Tusk
- Preceded by: Sławomir Kłosowski

Personal details
- Born: 1 July 1967 (age 59) Pabianice, Polish People's Republic
- Citizenship: Poland
- Party: Civic Platform
- Education: University of Łódź
- Occupation: Politician
- Awards: Cross of Merit

Monika Małgorzata Jurek (née Jarmolińska, born July 1, 1967 in Pabianice) is a Polish teacher, politician and local government activist, and Voivode of Opole Voivodeship since 2023.

== Biography ==
In 1992, she earned a master's degree in mathematics from the University of Łódź. She also completed postgraduate studies in educational organization and management and pedagogical supervision. Professionally involved in education, she worked as a mathematics teacher. For over a decade, she was the principal of the Prince George II Piast Construction School Complex in Brzeg. Later, she headed the Department of Education and Labor Market at the Marshal's Office of the Opole Voivodeship.

She is a member of the Civic Platform party. In 2010, she was elected a city councilor in Brzeg. In 2018, she was elected a councilor of the Brzeg County, and in the same year, she joined the county board. She ran unsuccessfully for the Sejm in 2019 and 2023.

In December 2023, she was appointed Voivode of the Opole Voivodeship.

In 2009, she was awarded the Silver Cross of Merit.
