= Sędziszów Małopolski =

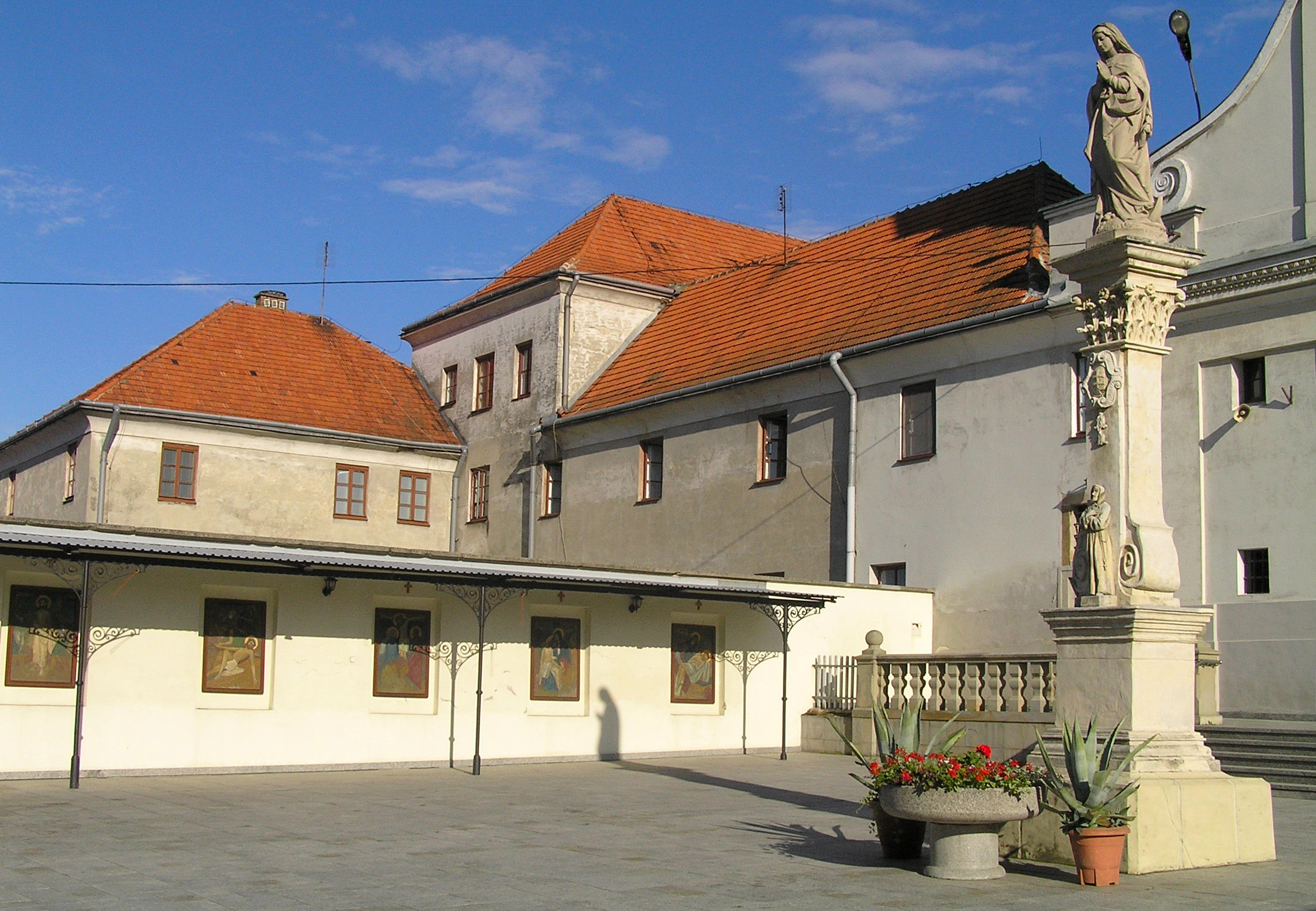
- St. Anthony's Church and Monastery in Sędziszów Małopolski

- Coat of arms

- Location within Poland
- Coordinates: 50°4′10″N 21°42′5″E
- Country: Poland
- Voivodeship: Subcarpathian
- County: Ropczyce-Sędziszów
- Gmina: Sędziszów Małopolski
- Town rights: 1483

Government
  - Mayor: Bogusław Kmieć (PiS)

Area
  - Total: 36.99 km^{2} (14.28 sq mi)

Population (2019)
  - Total: 12 226
  - Density: 0.32/km^{2} (0.84/sq mi)
- Time zone: UTC+1 (CET)
  - Summer (DST): UTC+2 (CEST)
- Postal code: 39-120
- Vehicle registration: RRS
- Website: www.sedziszow-mlp.pl

Sędziszów Małopolski [sɛɲˈd͡ʑiʂuf mawɔˈpɔlskʲi] is a town in Ropczyce-Sędziszów County, Subcarpathian Voivodeship, Poland, with a population of 12,226 (1 January 2019). Sędziszów is located in eastern Lesser Poland, near the historic boundary between Lesser Poland and Czerwień Cities/Red Ruthenia.

== Etymology ==
The name of the town probably comes from ancient Polish given name Sąd, which was popular in the noble Odrowąż family in the 13th century. In the past, Sędziszów was also known as Shendishov, Sandissów, Sandyszów, Schandzyssów, and Sandzischów.

== Location ==
In the Middle Ages, Sędziszów Małopolski was located on the border between the Kingdom of Poland and Czerwień Cities/Red Ruthenia. In 1340, after King Casimir III the Great re-captured the former Czerwień Cities, Sędziszów lost its status of a border town. The town lies between two geographical regions of Poland - the Carpathian Mountains, and Sandomierz Basin. Sędziszów's area is almost 10 square kilometres (4 sq mi), and the town is divided into 5 districts (osiedla). Sędziszów Małopolski lies along European route E40 as well as major rail line E30, which goes from Kraków towards the border with Ukraine.

== History ==
First mentions about Sędziszów Małopolski come from the 1320s, when its parish church belonged to the deanery at Dębica. The village belonged to the Odrowąż family, and due to efforts of Jan Odrowąż, Sędziszów was incorporated as a town on February 28, 1483, by King Casimir IV Jagiellon. In 1512 Sędziszów received the rights to organize weekly markets (on Tuesdays), and in 1555, the town passed to the hands of the Tarnowski family. In the 1620s, it belonged to Mikołaj Spytko Ligęza, who built roads and strengthened river banks. In 1649 Sędziszów Małopolski belonged to the Lubomirski family, and the town suffered in the 1650s. First, there was a plague, which decimated the population (1652), then, during the deluge, Sędziszów was destroyed by the army of George II Rakoczi. In 1661, the town passed on to the Potocki family, as a dowry in a wedding of Feliks Kazimierz Potocki with Krystyna Lubomirska. The Potockis made several investments in Sędziszów Małopolski, building a town hall, a new parish church and a monastery.

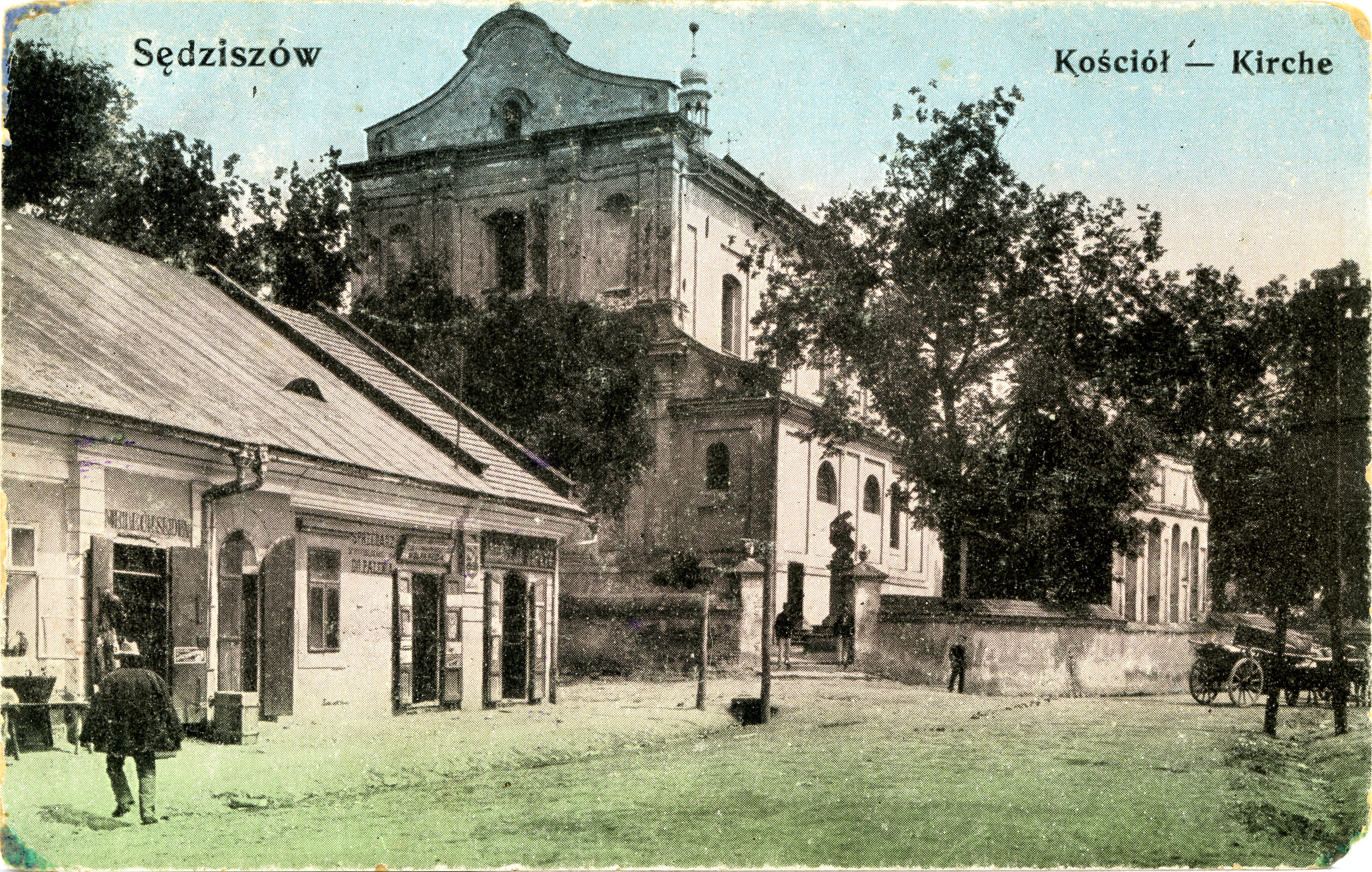
Early-20th-century postcard showing church of The Nativity of Mary in Sędziszów Małopolski

In the 18th century Sędziszów was frequently looted and burned - among others, during the Great Northern War and the Bar Confederation. In the First Partition of Poland in 1772, Sędziszów was annexed by the Austrian Empire, and in a fire of 1817, large parts of the town were destroyed. Between 1856 and 1858 Sędziszów received rail connections with Kraków and Lwów, and in the First World War, the town was seized by the Russians in September 1914. The Austrians managed to push them out in May 1915, and the retreating Russians set the town on fire. In 1918, Poland regained independence and control of the town. According to the 1921 census, the town had a population of 1,935, of which 61.8% declared Polish nationality and 38.1% declared Jewish nationality.

In the 1930s, Sędziszów Małopolski became one of centers of the Central Industrial Region, and in 1937, a new factory Zakłady Przemysłowe Sędziszów Małopolski was opened.

=== World War II ===
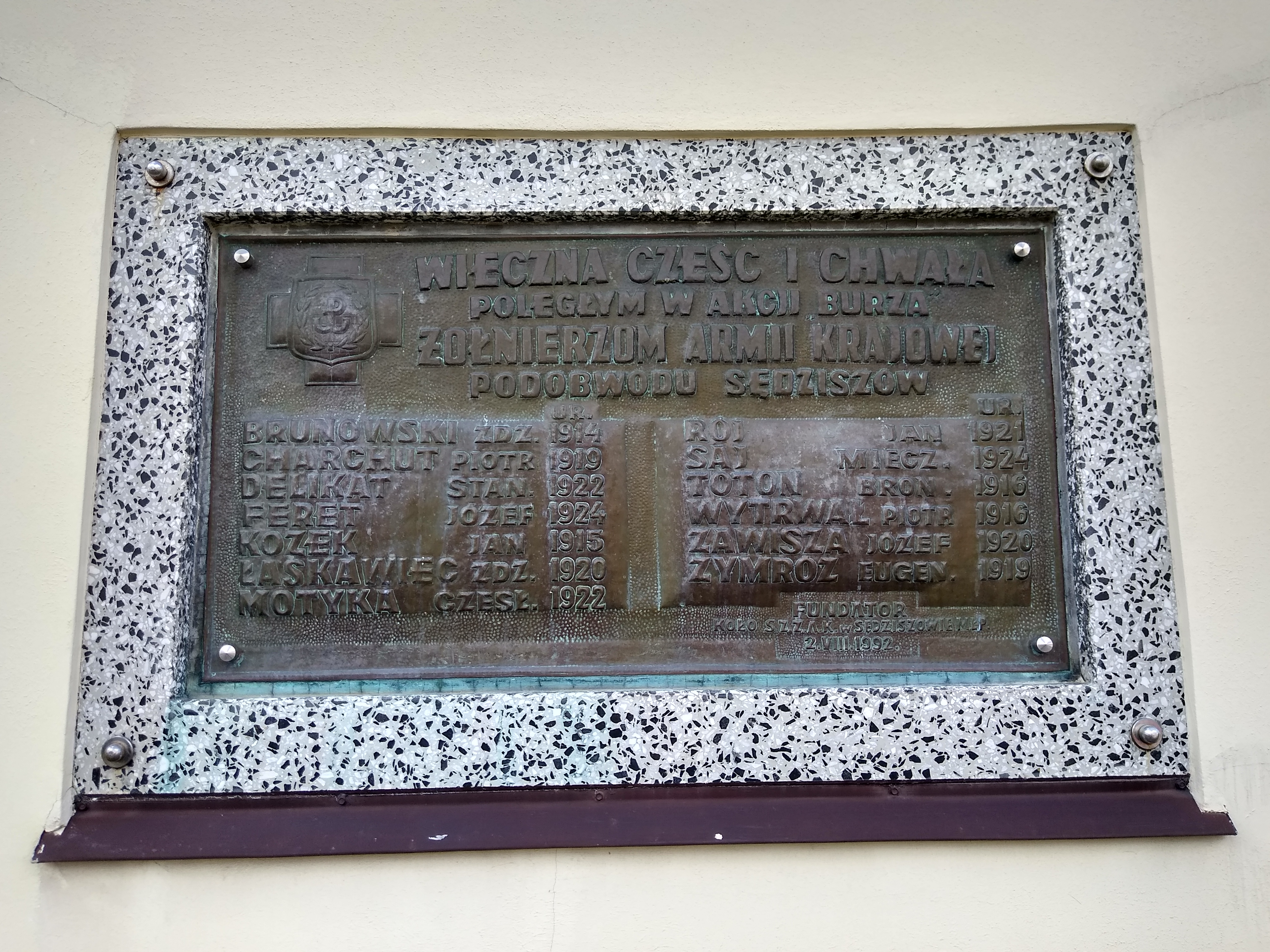
Memorial plaque to fallen partisans of the Home Army

During the German invasion of Poland at the start of World War II, on September 8, 1939, the town was captured by the Wehrmacht. The Germans opened here a ghetto, in which in mid-1942 there were 1,500 local Jews. In July 1942, the Germans murdered 280 Jews at the ghetto, and the remaining population was transported to Belzec extermination camp, where they perished. Sędziszów Małopolski was an important center of the Home Army, whose units participated in Operation Tempest.

When Peenemünde was bombed in Aug 1943, the Germans relocated the V-2 rocket test facility in the forests just a few kilometres northwest of Sędziszów Małopolski near Blizna. The first A-4 version test flight from Blizna took place on Nov 5 1943. The Germans had easy transportation on the railroad to Dębica, Ropczyce and Sędziszów Małopolski. At the peak of operations in 1944 as many as 10 rocket firing per day were conducted from Blizna. The last launch was in July 1944. The area was too far for the British to conduct reconnaissance flights, so it wasn't until the Russians advanced to take the base away from the German SS Commander in August 1944 that the rockets were investigated. The huge underground bunkers and facility are still visible today. The Polish underground spied on the facility and informed the British and Americans of the new v-2 location. One V-2 failed falling into the bug river and was recovered by the Polish resistance before the Germans arrived. The parts were smuggled to England.

The town was captured by the Soviets on August 4, 1944.

== Sights ==
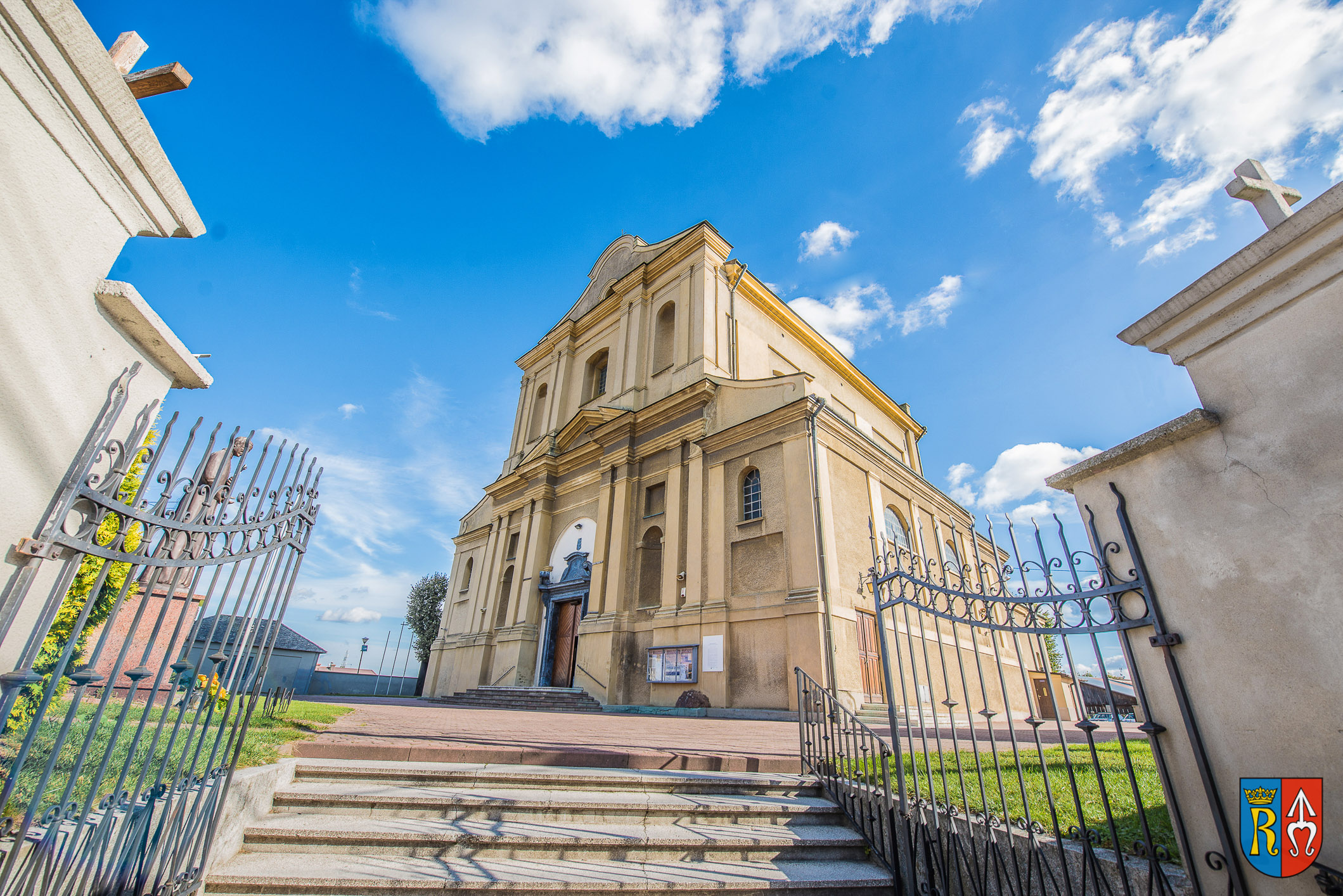
Baroque Church of the Nativity of the Virgin Mary

- rectangular-shaped town hall, built in the 17th century, and remodelled in the 19th century,
- late Baroque parish church of the Nativity of the Virgin Mary (1694–1699), which replaced the earlier wooden church, burned by the soldiers of George II Rakoczi,
- church and monastery (1739–1741),
- ruins of the 18th century army barracks for the private army of Mikolaj Potocki,
- cemetery chapel (1844),
- Jewish cemetery, destroyed by the Germans in 1942-43, with a monument dedicated to the people murdered on July 24, 1942.

== Sports ==
The town is home to a sports club Lechia, established in 1914.
