= Ropczyce =

Town in Podkarpackie Voivodeship, Poland

- Town
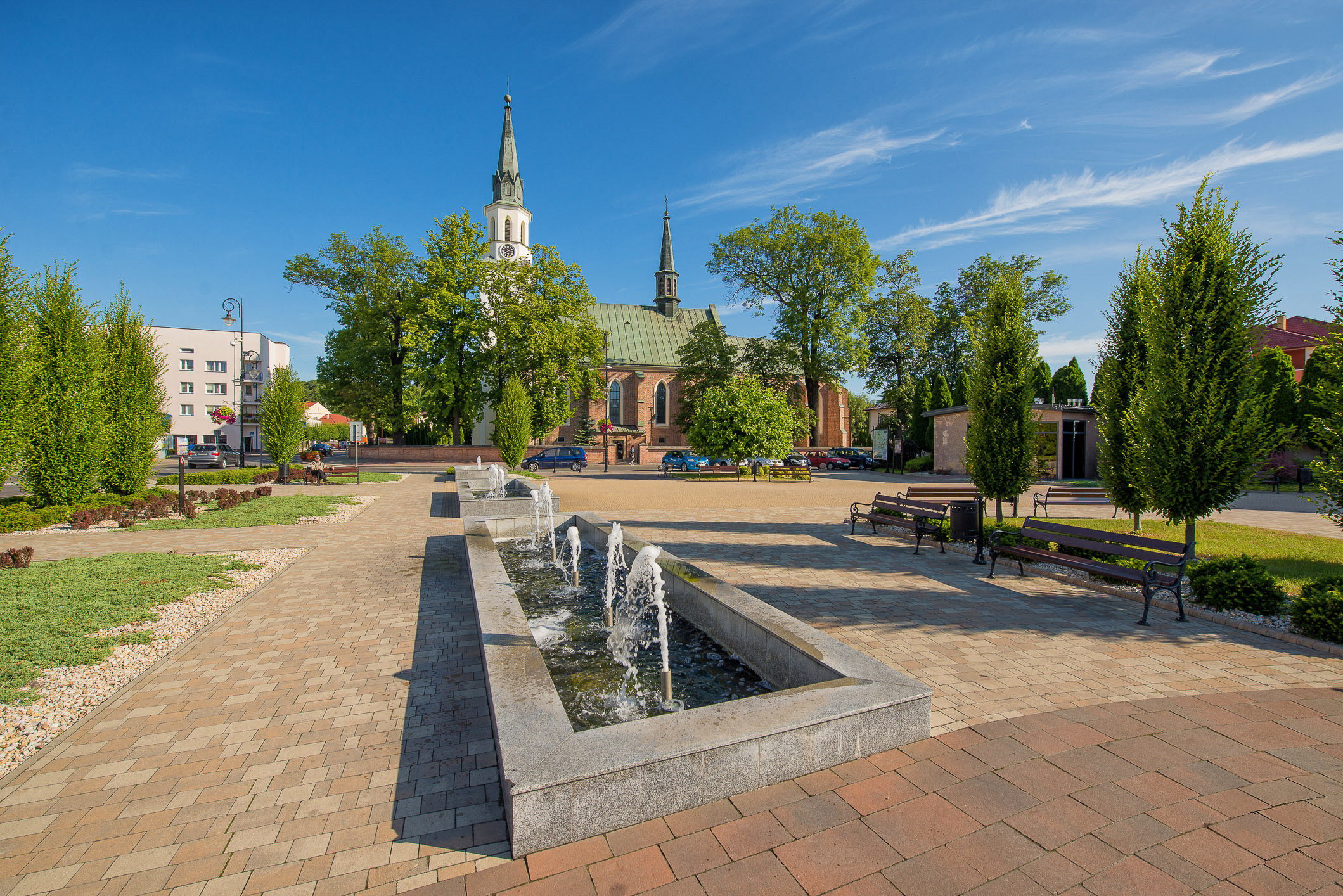
- Rynek (Market Square) with the Church of the Transfiguration

- Coat of arms

- Location within Poland
- Coordinates: 50°5′10″N 21°38′0″E
- Country: Poland
- Voivodeship: Subcarpathian
- County: Ropczyce-Sędziszów
- Gmina: Ropczyce
- Founded: 13th century
- Town rights: 1362

Government
  - Mayor: Kazimierz Moskal (PiS)

Area
  - Total: 47.03 km^{2} (18.16 sq mi)

Population (2007)
  - Total: 26,059
  - Density: 554.1/km^{2} (1,435/sq mi)
- Time zone: UTC+1 (CET)
  - Summer (DST): UTC+2 (CEST)
- Postal code: 39–100
- Vehicle registration: RRS
- Website: www.ropczyce.umig.gov.pl

Ropczyce [rɔpˈt͡ʂɨt͡sɛ] (Yiddish: ראָפּשיץ, romanized: Ropshitz) is a town in the Subcarpathian Voivodeship in south-eastern Poland, situated in the valley of the Wielopolka River (a tributary of the Wisłoka River). The town has a population of 15,098 (as of 2 June 2009). and is the seat of Ropczyce-Sędziszów County.

== Geography ==
Situated in the Subcarpathian Voivodeship, it is the capital of Ropczyce-Sędziszów County.

Ropczyce is located east of Kraków and west of Rzeszów. The coordinates for Ropczyce: Latitude 50°0500' and Longitude 21°6167. In DMS or Degree, Minutes, & Seconds; Latitude 50°2'60N and Longitude is 21°37'0E. Its elevation is 240 metres (787 feet) above sea level. The time zone for Poland is UTC+1.

== Population ==
Ropczyce has a total population of 26,055 according to the Polish Official Census 2008 of whom 15,098 live in the Ropczyce urban area and 10,957 live in the surrounding rural areas (7 km (4 mi) radius). It is the seat of Ropczyce-Sędziszów County, which has a total population of 713,350 people (30 June 2008).

== History ==
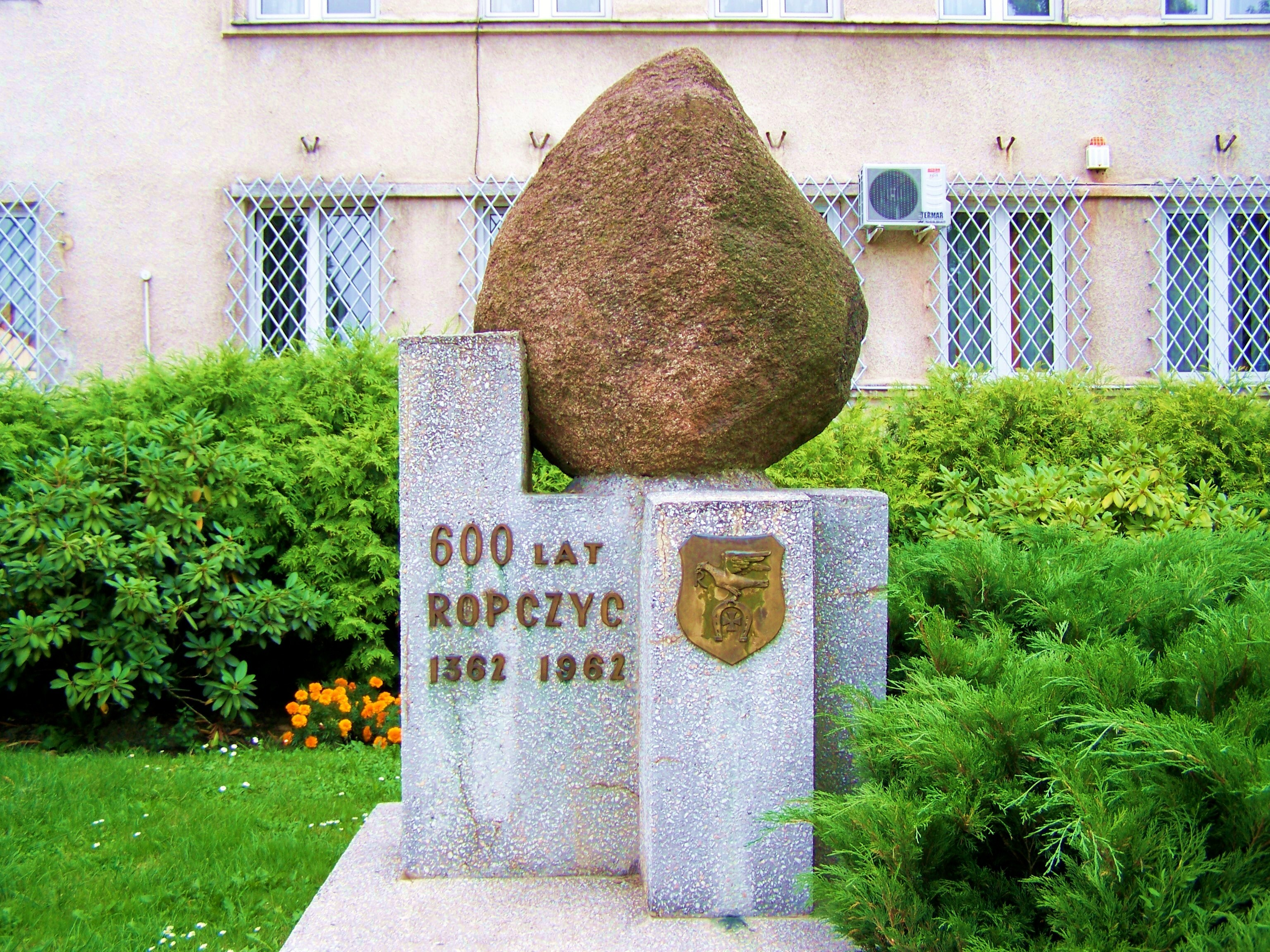
Memorial to the 600th anniversary of the obtaining of town rights by Ropczyce

The first reference to Ropczyce comes from a document of 1252, which confirmed the donation of the land by the brothers Klemens and Marek Gryf to a Cistercian Abbey in Szczyrzyc near Limanowa. Around this time Ropczyce was damaged by a Tatar raid. In 1266 the settlement was destroyed by an army composed of Ruthenians, Tatar and Lithuanian troops, led by the Ruthenian prince Shvarn. Ropczyce became a town on 3 March 1362, when the Polish king, Casimir III the Great, gave it town rights (Magdeburg rights). At the same time, he made two brothers, Jan and Mikolaj Gielnic the first wójts or advocates of the new town. He also made Ropczyce a parish, separate from the parish of Sędziszow. Within six years a parish church was built in the new royal town of Ropczyce. As Ropczyce was situated close to the Sandomierz Forest (Polish: Puszcza Sandomierska), one of the biggest forests in southern Poland, which covers large parts of the Sandomierz Basin, it became a popular place for the Polish Kings to stay when they went hunting and fishing. King Casimir III the Great, king Casimir IV Jagiellon and king Władysław II Jagiełło were regular visitors to Ropczyce. Under the patronage of the Polish Royals and subsequent trade agreements with Ruthenia, the town's future started to look very good. It could then grow and develop, also due to its favourable location on an important trade route from Silesia and Lesser Poland to Ruthenia. Ropczyce was severely damaged during a Tatar raid in 1504. To help the town and citizens recover from this tragedy, king Alexander Jagiellon gave all the citizens a 10-year tax exemption from 1504 to 1514 In the 15th and 16th centuries Ropczyce became a major centre in the manufacture of canvas goods.

Since its formation Ropczyce has been known by several different names, although these appear to be phonetic variations of the same name. By the middle of the 16th century, it was first recorded as 'Ropczyce' replacing the previous variation of 'Robczyce' – this name is thought to have probably originated from the family name of Robek (from the Polish verb, robić – "to work") who are thought to have established the original settlement.

In the 16th century Ropczyce's churches were influenced by the Reformation, with the Parish Church going over to Protestantism several times. Around the 1550s the Parish Church was under the control of the Polish Brethren (also called Arians or Socinians) for over a decade.

=== 17th century to 18th century ===
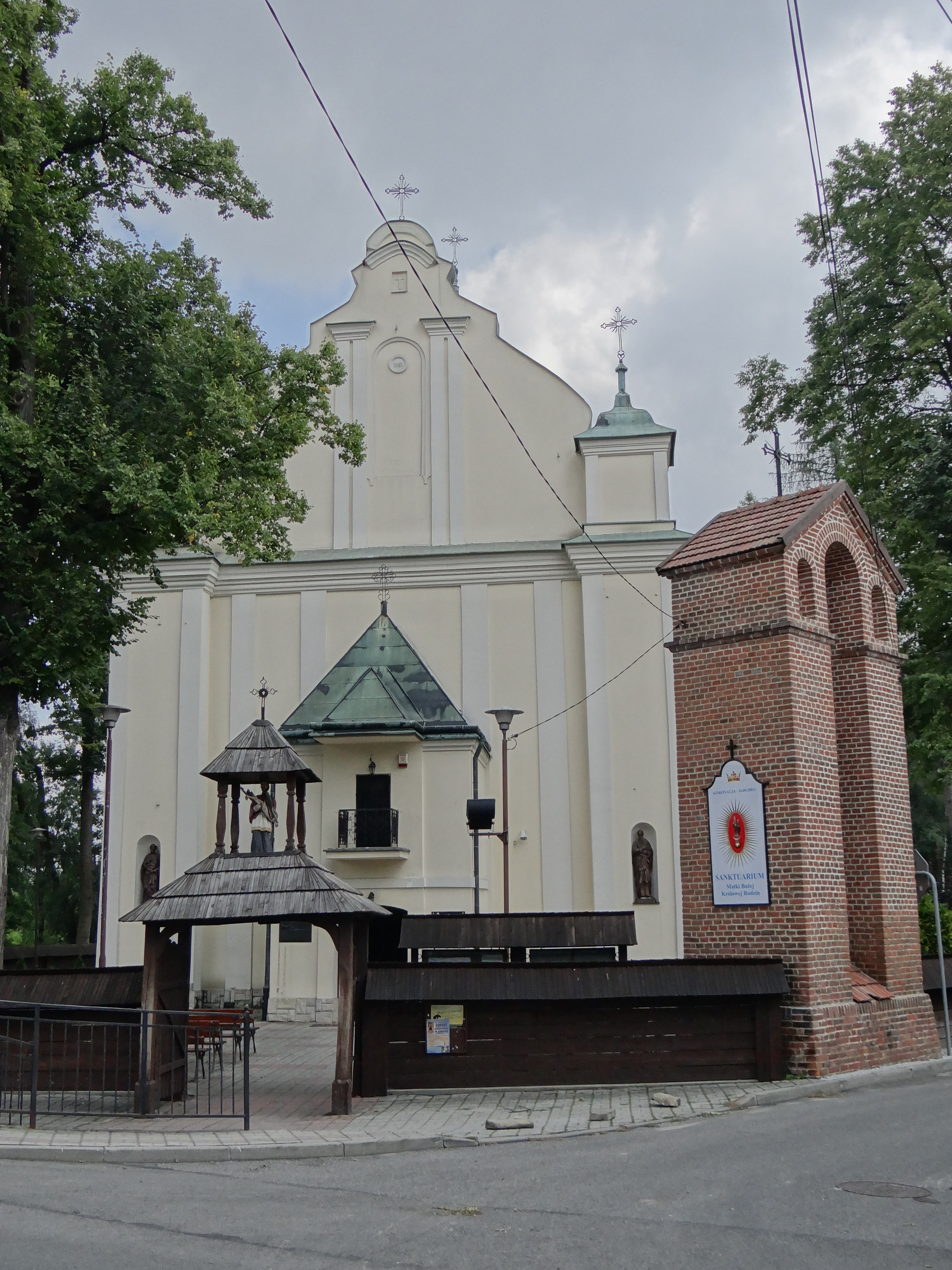
Baroque Holy Name of Mary church

Ropczyce's "Golden Age" was but a distant memory in the 17th and 18th centuries – these were times of wars and invasions. The town went into decline and life got a lot harder for the townspeople. In 1605 over half of the town was destroyed in a great fire. Fifty years later, Ropczyce was hit by The Plague. Ropczyce was plundered by Swedish troops in 1655 and then devastated in 1657 by the army of George II Rákóczi, the Prince of Transylvania. In 1669 the Parish Church was destroyed by fire.

On 14 July 1772, following the First Partition of Poland, Ropczyce found itself in the Austrian province of Galicia, part of the Habsburg monarchy in the Austro-Hungarian Kingdom of Galicia and Lodomeria. Ropczyce was first located in the administrative area (or cyrkuł) of Pilzno and in the Sandomierz district. In 1775 the administrative areas in Galicia were reorganised and Ropczyce was reallocated to the Tarnów cyrkuł. Fortunately for Ropczyce, as a 'Royal town', it was given virtually autonomous administration. The position of 'town advocate' was replaced by the new position of mayor. However, during these times the whole region was systematically Germanised, from the system of administration, local by-laws, education to everyday life.

=== 19th century to 20th century ===
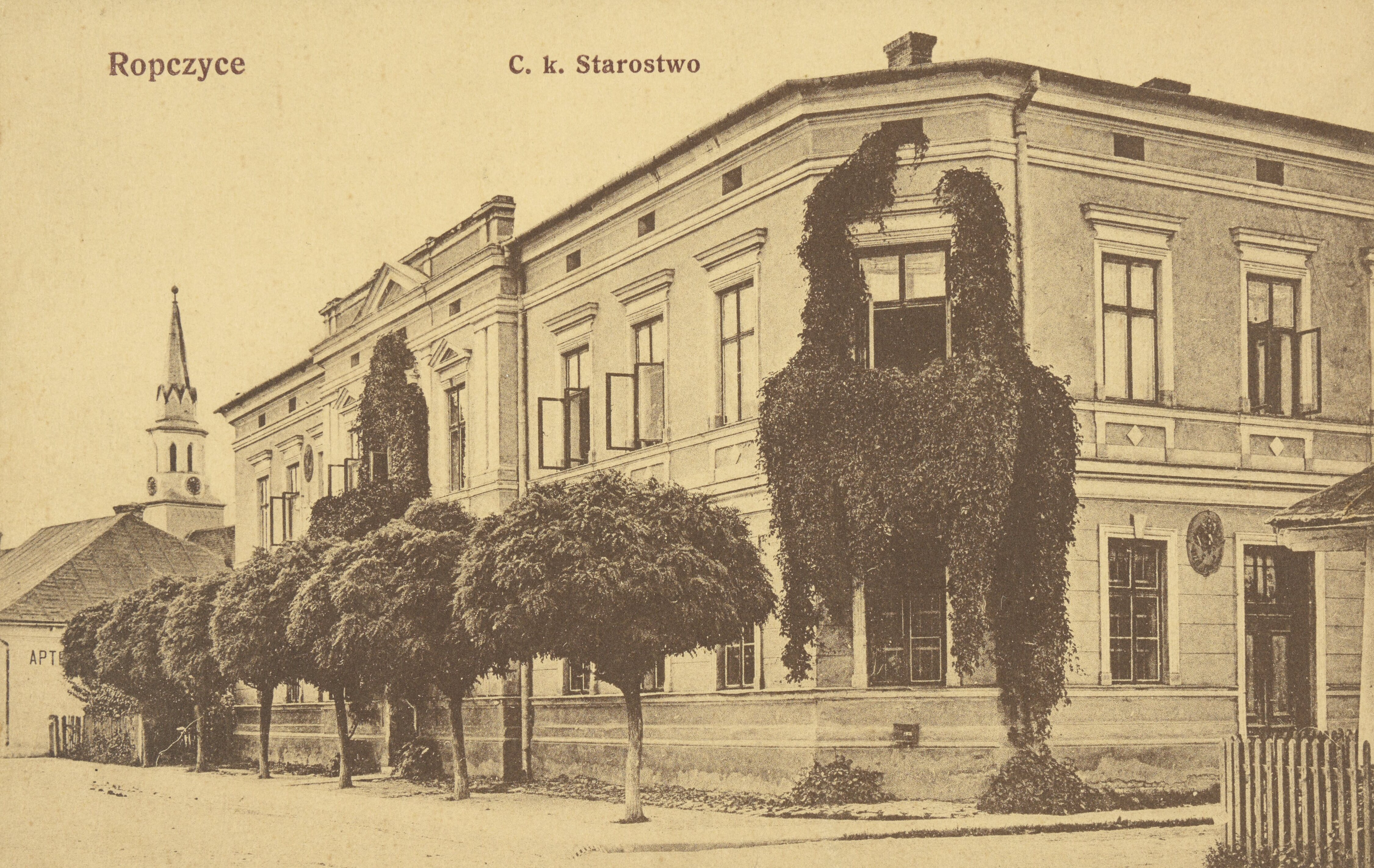
County council, ca 1906-1914

At the beginning of the 19th century, the population grew to over 1,000. At this time there was a small Austrian garrison stationed in the town. In 1806 there was a cholera outbreak in which 133 people from Ropczyce died. In 1873 the town was again struck by a great fire, with much destruction.

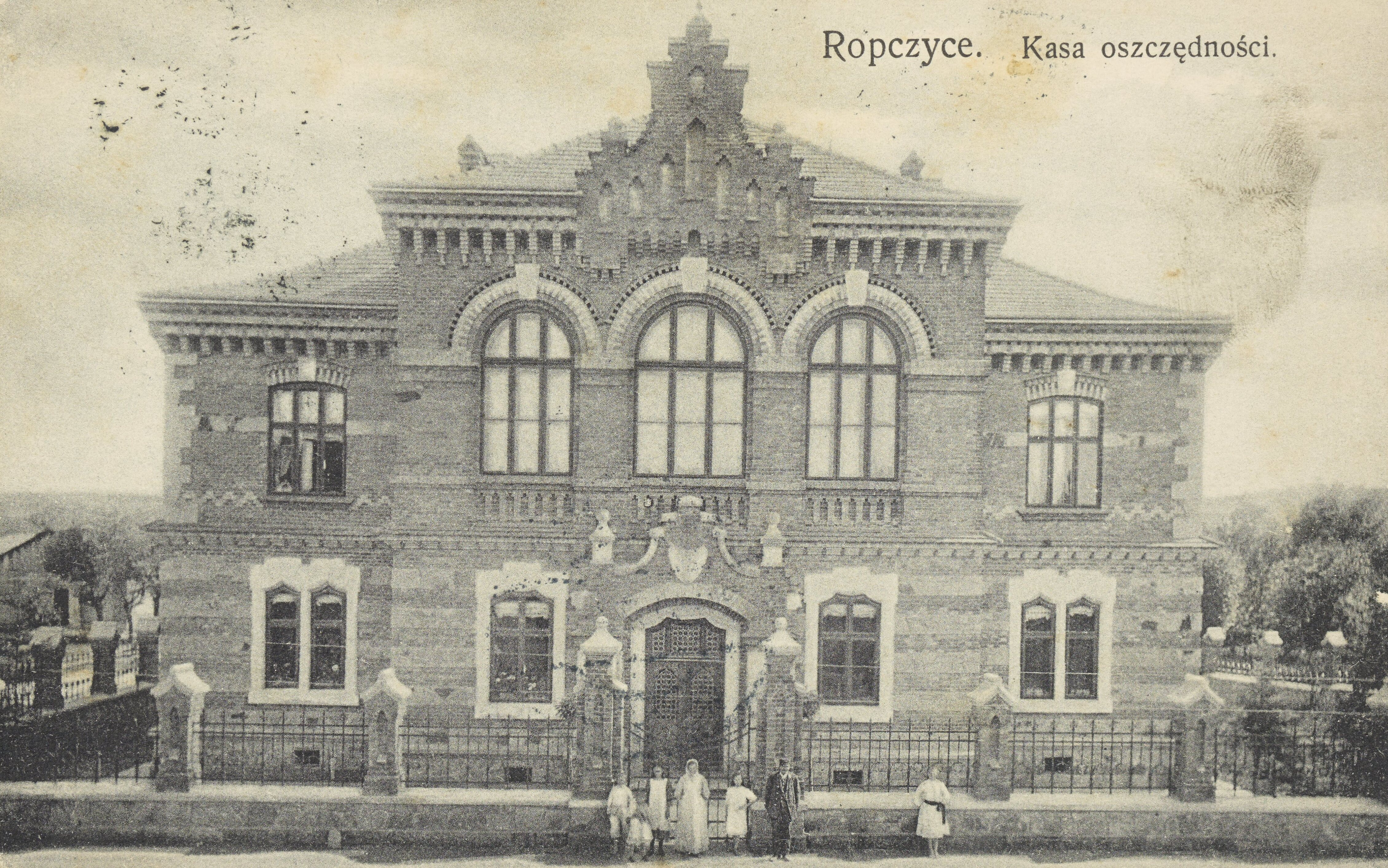
Savings bank, 1907

In the following administrative changes of the region of Galicia in 1885, 178 counties (powiats) were created in the existing 19 administrative areas (cyrkułs) and Ropczyce was made the administrative centre of its own |county. The last reorganisation occurred in 1867 saw the reduction of administrative areas and the number of counties set to 74. Ropczyce remained as the seat of its county. At the end of 1867 the population of Ropczyce county was 58,975 people, the first starosta; elder or mayor of the reorganised county of Ropczyce was Wilhelm Mehoffer (father of Józef Mehoffer, Polish painter). Ropczyce remained part of Galicia until 1918, when it became again part of independent Poland (Second Polish Republic).

According to the 1921 census, the town had a population of 3,002, of which 89.3% declared Polish nationality and 10.4% declared Jewish nationality.

Following the German-Soviet invasion of Poland, which started World War II in September 1939, the town was occupied by Germany until 1944. The Polish resistance was quickly organized in Ropczyce, and already on 29 November 1939, it launched an attack on a German police station.

=== Jewish history ===
The earliest information about Jews settling in Ropczyce dates back to 1564. It was noted then that four Jewish families, i.e. about 30 people, lived on the farm of the Gryf family. In 1604, King Sigismund III Vasa granted Ropczyce with a law, following which only two Jewish families (of a district's leaseholder and of a tax collector) were allowed to live in the town, however, they were strictly forbidden to "do business and produce alcohol..."

The 17th century was the time of the town's stagnation and downfall. Ropczyce was plundered by Swedish troops in 1655 and conclusively devastated in 1657 by the army of George II Rákóczi, the Prince of Transylvania. Many houses in the town were deserted and ruined after the wars. As nobody paid for them, the local authorities tried to occupy the houses with new inhabitants. However, Polish townsmen were not interested in it, and so Jews were the buyers, despite the fact that the ban on their settling in the town was still in effect. The law was broken for the first time in 1675, when the Town Council allowed Józef Szmul, a Jew, to acquire a house at the Market Square under condition of renovating the building. In exchange for that, he was exempted from paying taxes for two years.

At the end of the 18th century, Ropczyce became a significant center of Chassidism after the famous Naftali Zvi Horowitz (1760–1827) settled in the town (He was born on 22 May 1760, the day that the Baal Shem Tov, founder of Chassidism, died). He was the son of Menachem Mendel Rubin, the rabbi of Lesko and a follower of two great tzadikkim: Elimelech of Leżajsk (Lizhensk) and Menachem Mendel of Rymanów. Tzadik Naftali Zvi Horowitz was the author of, among others,Zera Kodesh (a collection of comments to the Torah, published in 1868), and Ohel Naftali (a collection of sayings, published in 1911). At the end of his life, he left Ropczyce and settled in Łańcut where he died on 8 May 1827 (corresponding to 11 Iyar 5587) and where he was buried. Asher of Ropczyce was the next tzadik of the town. The sons of Naftali Zvi Horowitz also became tzadikkim: Eliezer Horowitz – in Dzików near Tarnobrzeg, and Jakub Horowitz (named The Small Baal Shem Tov, usually translated into English as Master of the Good Name, due to numerous miracles that he performed) – in Kolbuszowa and later in Mielec.

Up until World War II Ropczyce was a shtetl (Yiddish: ראָפּשיץ, Ropshits, Ropshitz, Ropschitz) with a significant Jewish population. There is a Ropshitz Hasidic dynasty.

The Germans occupied Ropczyce in September 1939 and immediately began brutalizing the Jewish population, at that time around 1000 people. They burned the synagogue and shortly began to conscript Jews for forced labor. Many Jewish refugees from nearby villages came to Ropczyce during the next two years. In May, 1942, 75 men were deported to a labor camp in Pustków. In June, there was another roundup where 23 people were murdered on the spot and others were sent to Pustków. Later in the month, the remaining Jews were forced into an overcrowded ghetto. In July, the Germans shot 28 people, children and the elderly, and took the rest of the Jewish population to Sędziszów Małopolski. Several hundred were shot there and the rest sent by train to Belzec where they were immediately gassed. The number of survivors among the Ropczyce Jews is unknown.

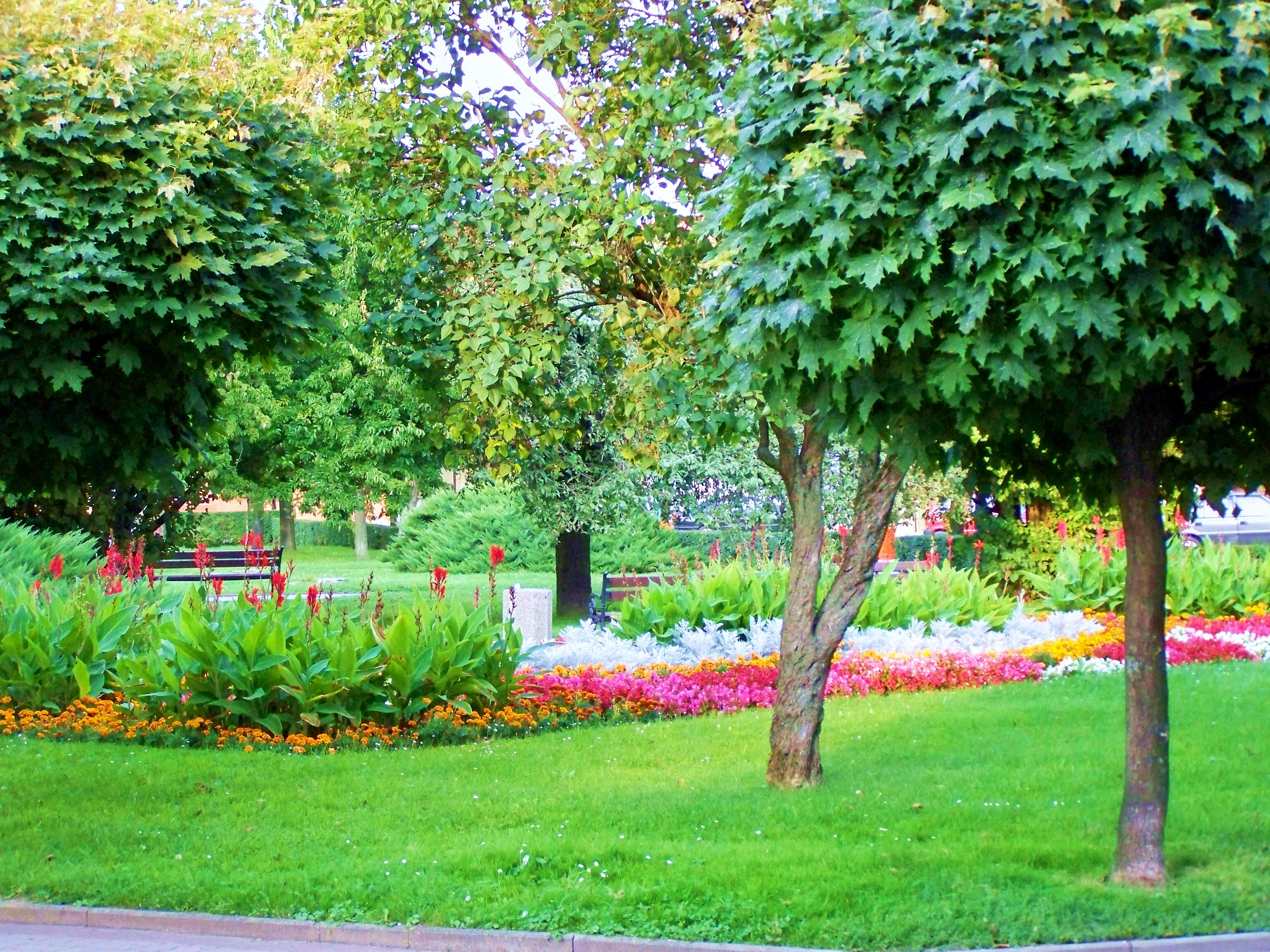
A park in Ropczyce

== Transport ==
Ropczyce is located on the main West-East European E40 Highway, which goes from Calais in France via Belgium, across Germany, Poland, Ukraine and onto Russia and Kazakhstan. (Within Poland the E40 follows the A4 Highway and the DK 4 National Road). However, the A4 is not regarded as a 'highway' in the Ropczyce area – it is by Western standards, just a regular, one-lane main A-road (although, it is currently being upgraded). Other Polish cities located by the E40 are Wrocław, Opole, Katowice, Kraków, Tarnów, Rzeszów and Przemyśl.

The nearest airport is Rzeszów-Jasionka Airport (Port Lotniczy Rzeszów-Jasionka) located in the village of Jasionka, north of Rzeszów. It is about 35 kilometres (22 miles) east of Ropczyce on the E40 and takes about 40 minutes by car. Scheduled passenger services include flights to: Warsaw (WAW), Dublin, London (Stansted), Bristol, UK, Birmingham, UK, New York (JFK Airport, and Newark Liberty International Airport).

Ropczyce has a railway station which is on the main west–east rail route; Line 91. This runs from Silesia and Kraków, Kraków Main station (Kraków Główny) – Medyka on the Polish eastern border. This line then continues on to Ukraine.

== International relations ==
=== Twin towns – Sister cities ===
Ropczyce is twinned with:

Stropkov in Slovakia; Ochsenfurt in Germany	Busk in Ukraine; Lokeren in Belgium

== Notable people ==
- Stanisław "Rewera" Potocki (1579–1667), nobleman, magnate and military leader
- Feliks Kazimierz Potocki (1630–1702), nobleman, magnate and military leader
- Franciszek Salezy Potocki (1700–1772), nobleman and knight
- Adam Baal Shem, mystic and religious leader
- Rabbi Naftali fun Ropszyc (1760–1827), religious leader
- Piotr Michałowski (1800–1855), Polish painter
- Karol Olszewski (1846–1915), chemist, mathematician, physicist
- Roman Zawiliński (1855–1932), Polish linguist, pedagogue and ethnographer
- Józef Mehoffer (1869–1946), Polish painter and decorative artist
- Stanisław Kot (1885–1975), historian, politician, ambassador
- Wojciech Aleksander Durek^{*} (1888–1951) (*Polish Wikipage only) (artist & sculptor)
- Tadeusz Kantor (1915–1990) (artist, theatre director)
- Wilhelm Mach^{*} (1917–1965)(*Polish Wikipage only) (literary critic)
- Stanisław Jarmoliński (born 1944), politician and physician
- Józef Rojek (born 1950), politician
- Maciej Kuciapa (born 1975), (Polish speedway rider)

== Education ==
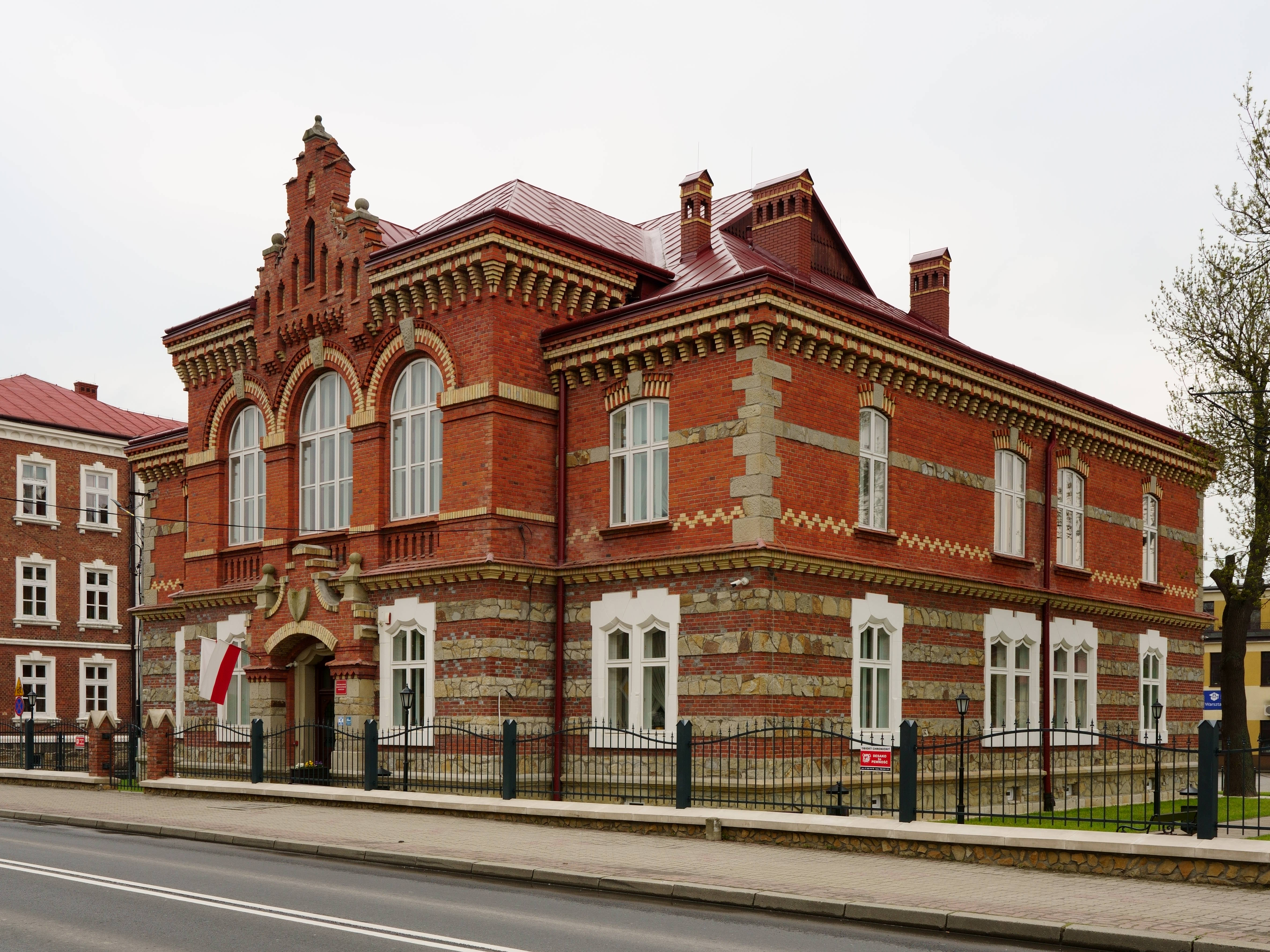
County Cultural Education Center

- Publiczne Przedszkole nr.1 im. Marii Konopnickiej "Website (in Polish)".
- Wyższa Szkoła Inżynieryjno-Ekonomiczna
- Liceum Ogólnokształcące im. Tadeusza Kościuszki "Website (in Polish)".
- Zespół Szkół im. ks. dr Jana Zwierza
- Zespół Szkół Agrotechnicznych im. Wincentego Witosa "Website (in Polish)". Archived from the original on 3 August 2008.
- Nauczycielskie Kolegium Języków Obcych
- Centrum Kształcenia Praktycznego
- Bibioteka Powiatowa and 2 filie miejskie

== Nearby municipalities ==
- Dębica
- Sędziszów Małopolski

== Recreational walking trails ==
Two tourist trails: run through the most picturesque and interesting parts of the terrain.

- Green Walk: Przełęcz Bardo – Brzeziny – Ropczyce
- Yellow Walk: Ropczyce – Ocieka – Niwiska
