= Ropczyce-Sędziszów County =

Ropczyce-Sędziszów County Powiat ropczycko-sędziszowski
- County
- Flag Coat of arms

- Location within the voivodeship

- Division into gminas
- Coordinates (Ropczyce): 50°5′10″N 21°38′0″E
- Country: Poland
- Voivodeship: Subcarpathian
- Seat: Ropczyce
- Gminas: Total 5: Gmina Iwierzyce; Gmina Ostrów; Gmina Ropczyce; Gmina Sędziszów Małopolski; Gmina Wielopole Skrzyńskie

Area
  - Total: 548.89 km^{2} (211.93 sq mi)

Population (2019)
  - Total: 74,416
  - Density: 135.58/km^{2} (351.14/sq mi)
  - Urban: 28,193
  - Rural: 46,223
- Car plates: RRS
- Website: www.powiat.ropczyce.rze.pl

Ropczyce-Sędziszów County (Polish: powiat ropczycko-sędziszowski) is a unit of territorial administration and local government (powiat) in Subcarpathian Voivodeship, south-eastern Poland. It came into being on January 1, 1999, as a result of the Polish local government reforms passed in 1998. Its administrative seat and largest town is Ropczyce, which lies 28 kilometres (17 mi) west of the regional capital Rzeszów. The only other town in the county is Sędziszów Małopolski, lying 6 km (4 mi) east of Ropczyce.

The county covers an area of 548.89 square kilometres (211.9 sq mi). As of 2019 its total population is 74,416, out of which the population of Ropczyce is 15,836, that of Sędziszów Małopolski is 12,357, and the rural population is 46,223.

== Neighbouring counties ==
Ropczyce-Sędziszów County is bordered by Mielec County and Kolbuszowa County to the north, Rzeszów County to the east, Strzyżów County to the south, and Dębica County to the west.

== Administrative divisions ==
The county is subdivided into five gminas (two urban-rural and three rural). These are listed in the following table, in descending order of population.

Gmina	Type	Area (km^{2})	Population (2019)	Seat
Gmina Ropczyce	urban-rural	139	27,449	Ropczyce
Gmina Sędziszów Małopolski	urban-rural	156	23,740	Sędziszów Małopolski
Gmina Wielopole Skrzyńskie	rural	93	8,166	Wielopole Skrzyńskie
Gmina Iwierzyce	rural	65	7,707	Iwierzyce
Gmina Ostrów	rural	96	7,354	Ostrów
