= Miasteczko =

Type of small, historical settlement in Europe

A miasteczko (Polish: [mjaˈstɛtʂkɔ], miestelis (Lithuanian: [mjeːstæːlîːs], lit. 'small town', Ukrainian: містечко, mistechko, Russian: местечко miestiechko) was a historical type of urban settlement similar to a market town in the former Polish–Lithuanian Commonwealth. After the partitions of Polish–Lithuanian Commonwealth at the end of the 18th century, these settlements became widespread in the Austrian, German and Russian empires. The vast majority of miasteczkos had significant or even predominant Jewish populations; these are known in English under the Yiddish term shtetl. Miasteczkos had a special administrative status other than that of town or city.

== History ==
Typically, miasteczkos grew out of or remained private towns belonging to Polish-Lithuanian landlords, usually magnates or nobles, who sought to obtain royal privileges to establish markets and fairs and do business in liquor. Town owners favoured the Jews to bring in trade, particularly liquor.

The meaning "small town" is somewhat misleading since some 19th-century shtetls, such as Berdychiv or Bohuslav, counted over 15,000 people. Therefore, after Russian Imperial authorities annexed parts of Poland-Lithuania (which included much of Central, Eastern and Baltic European regions) they had difficulties in formally defining what a miasteczko is. Russian Imperial authorities also converted private towns into state-owned towns (Russian kazyonny gorod "treasury-owned town"). This process intensified after the Polish November Uprising (1830–31). The Russian borrowed term mestechko continued to apply to privately- and Imperially-owned towns.

In present-day Poland, the miasteczko does not have a special administrative status and the term is informally used for small towns as well as for settlements which lost town privileges (see List of former cities of Poland).

In Lithuania miestelis retains special administrative status and the term is used for small towns, usually smaller than a town (named miestas) or a city (usually named both miestas – lit. 'a town, a city' or didmiestis - lit. 'a large city'), but larger than a kaimas (lit. 'a large village'). The majority of inhabitants of miestelis should work in manufacturing, retail or service industries as opposed to a village type of settlement (kaimas), where the majority of inhabitants are employed in agriculture (there are some villages with more inhabitants than miestelis in Lithuania). Miestelis status is also applied for settlements which historically were more prominent than today, once had but lost its town privileges. Usually a miestelis is inhabited between 500 and 3000 people. In 2021 there are 247 miestelis type settlements in Lithuania (235 in 1986).

A few Miestelis type settlements in Lithuania

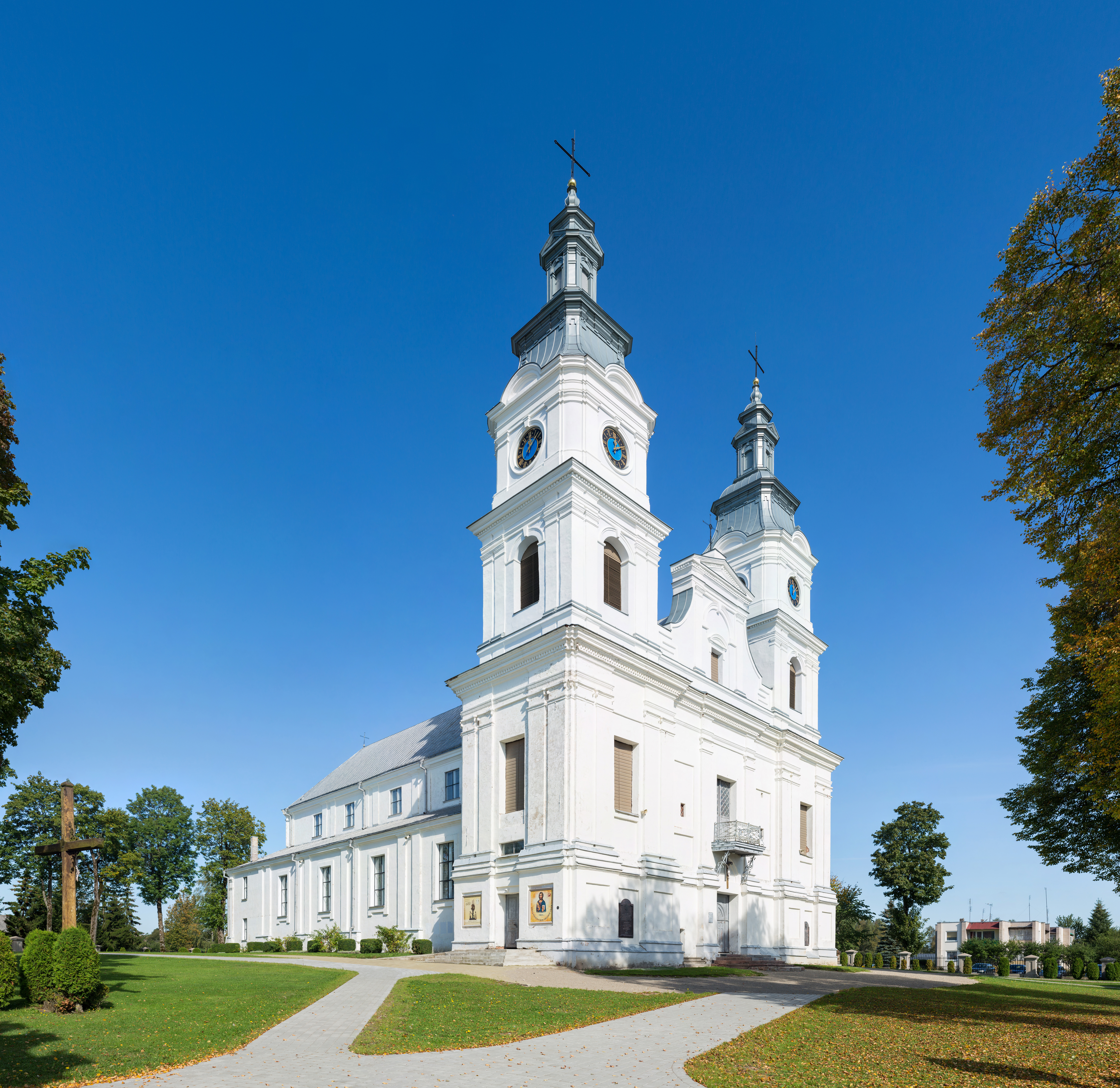
Žemaičių Kalvarija

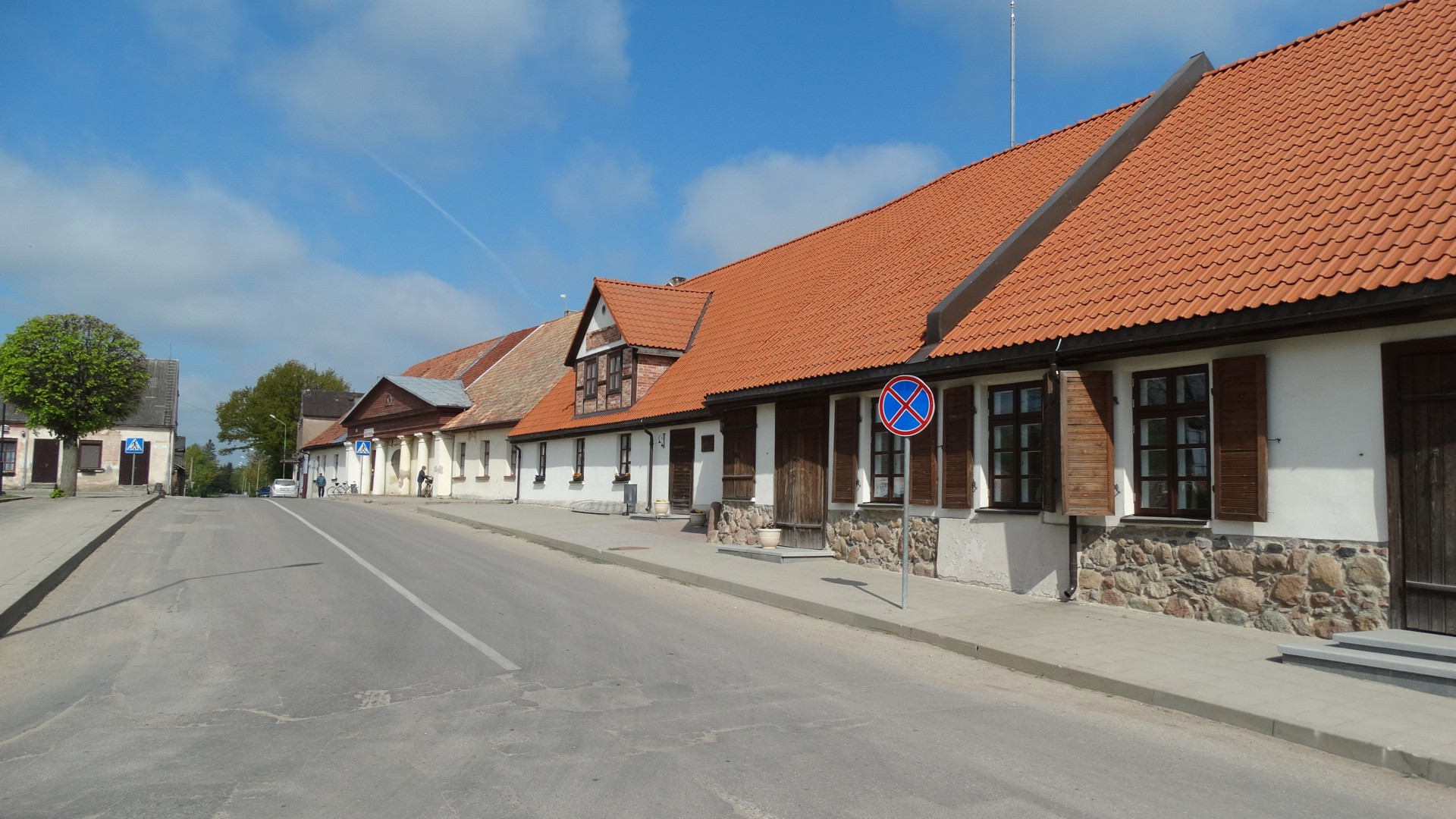
Žeimelis

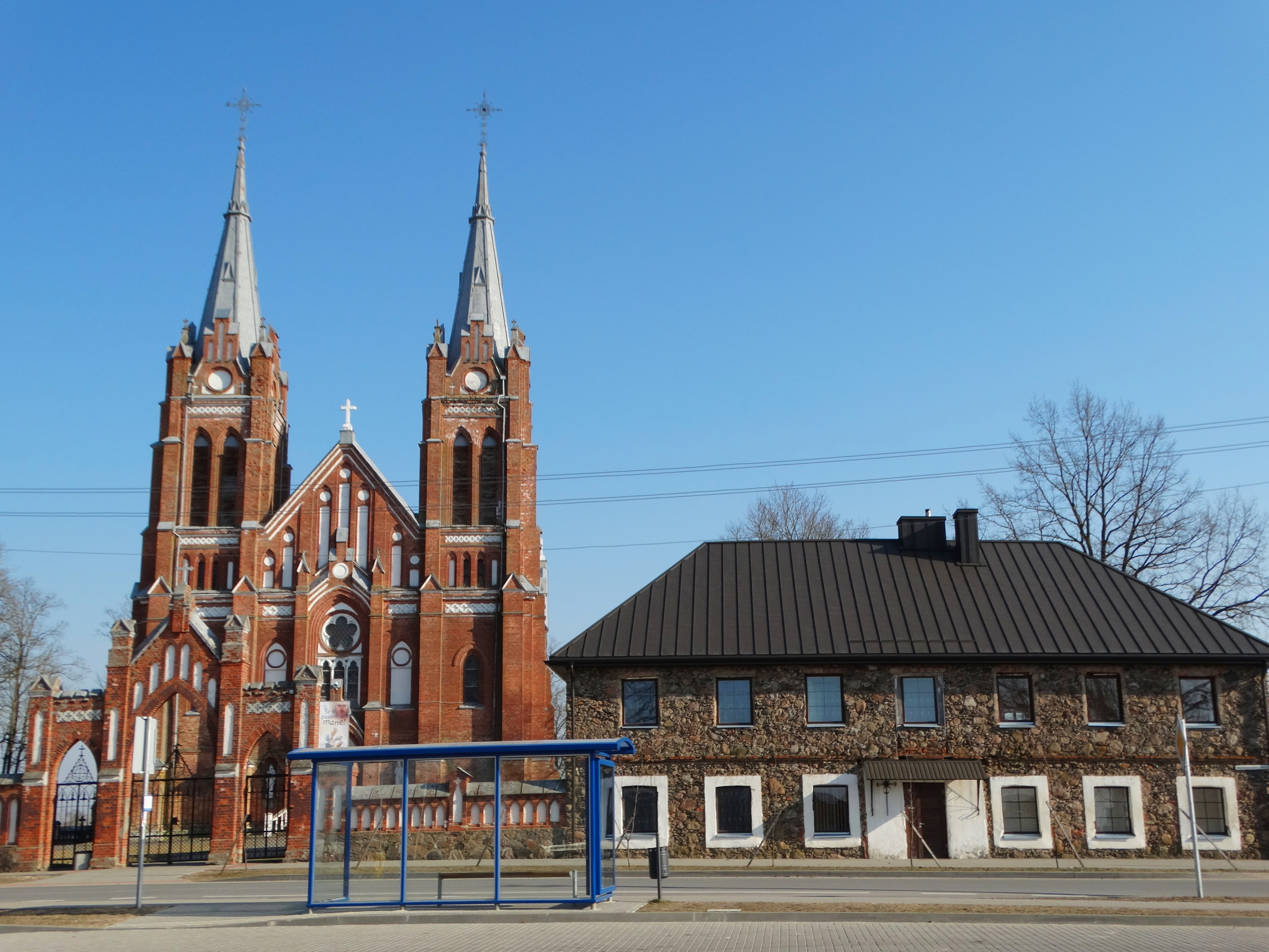
Gruzdžiai

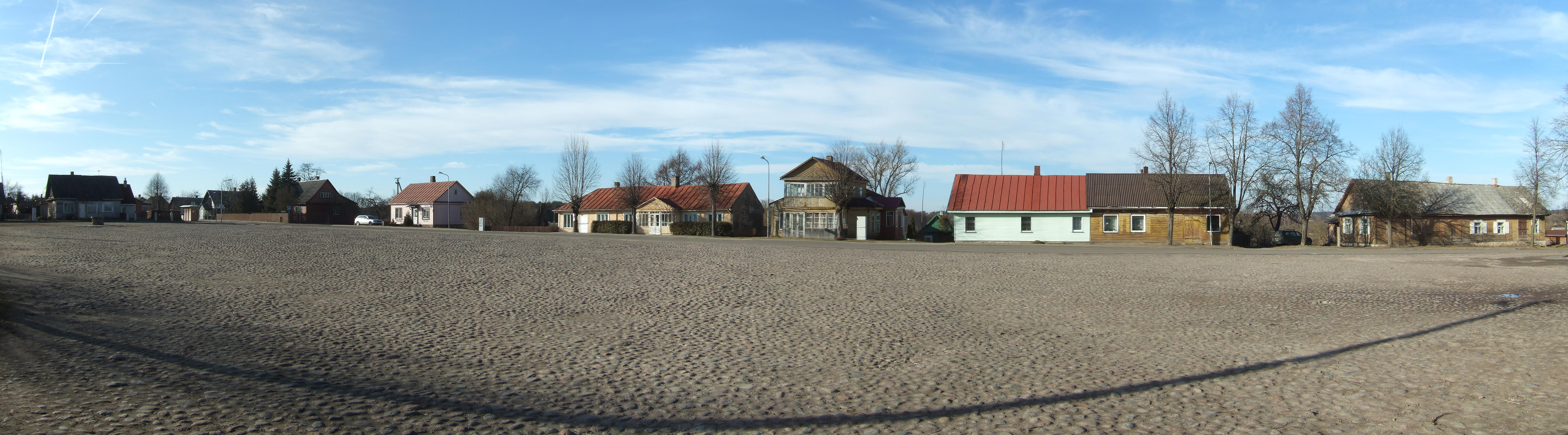
Onuškis

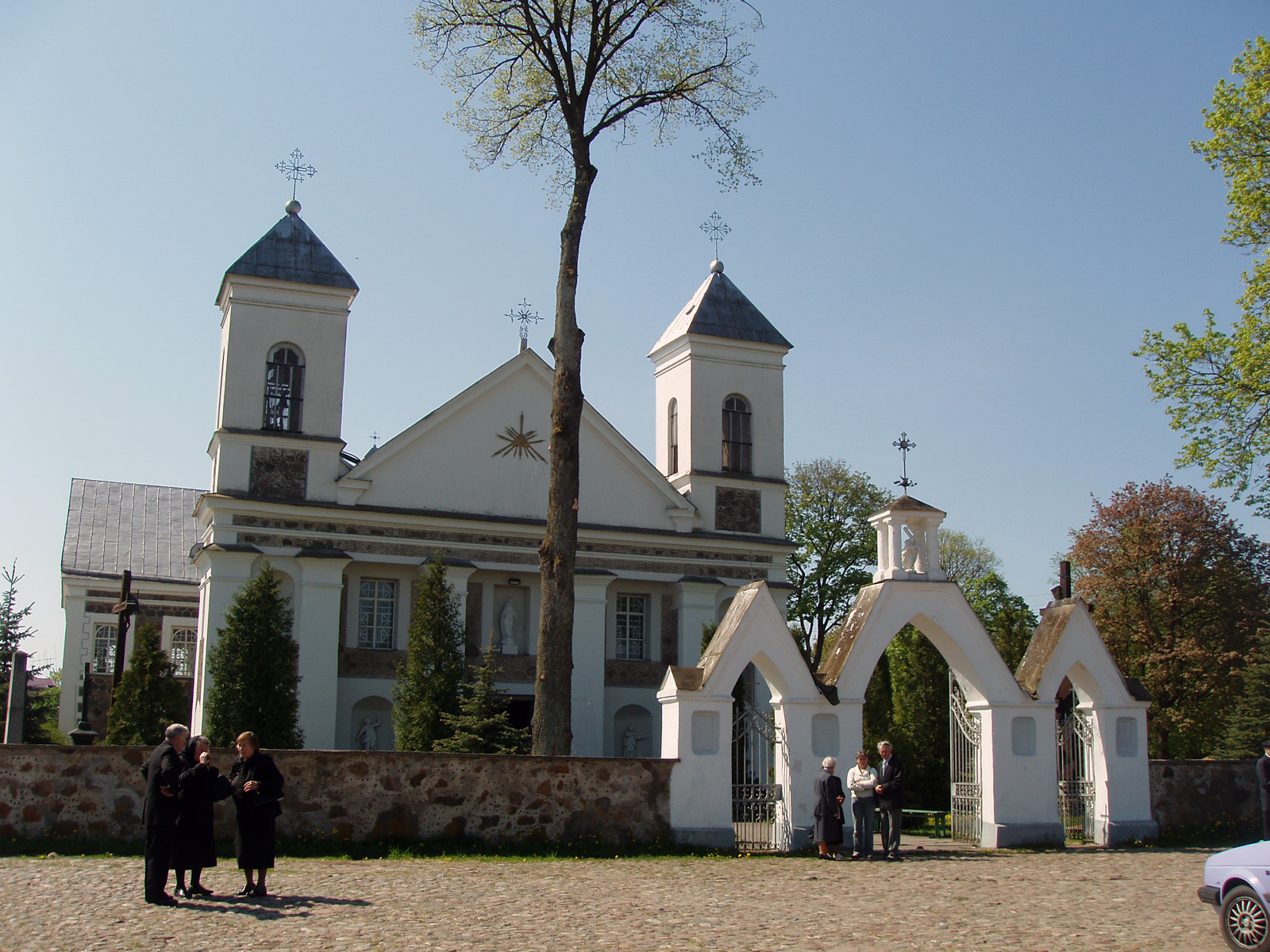
Valkininkai

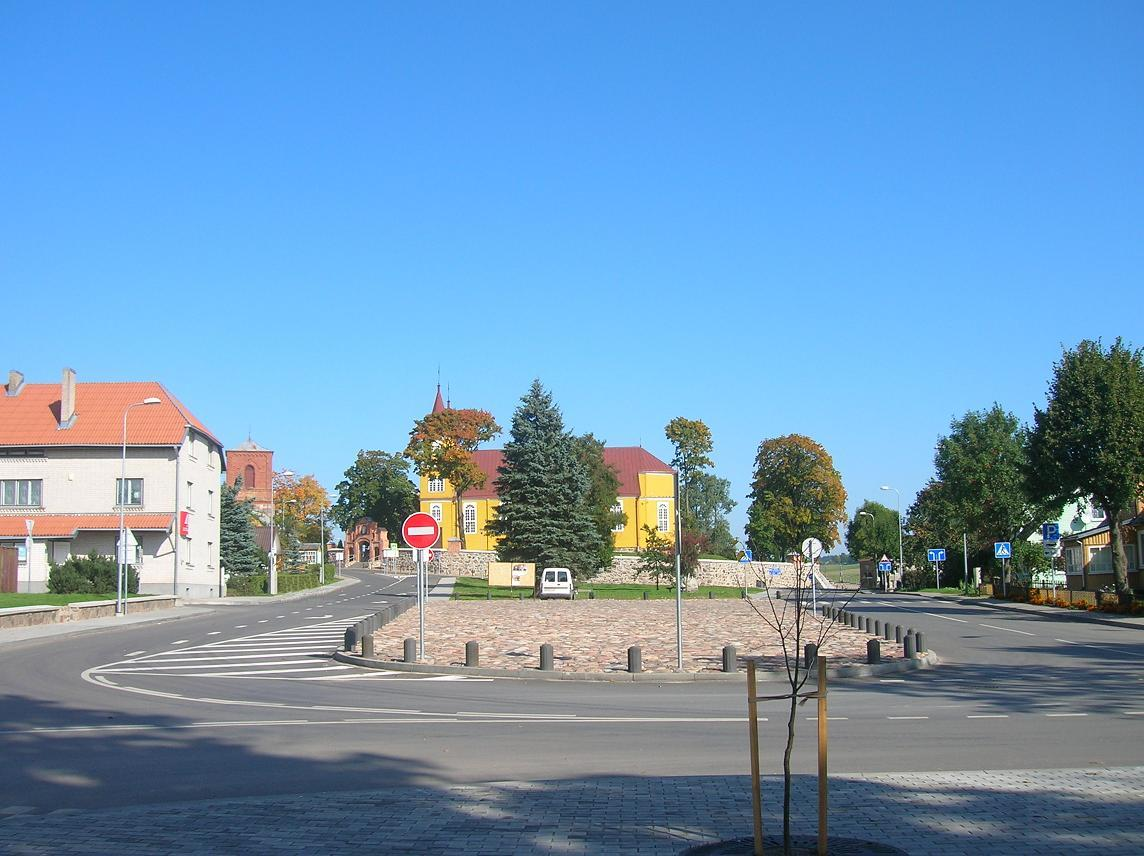
Tverai

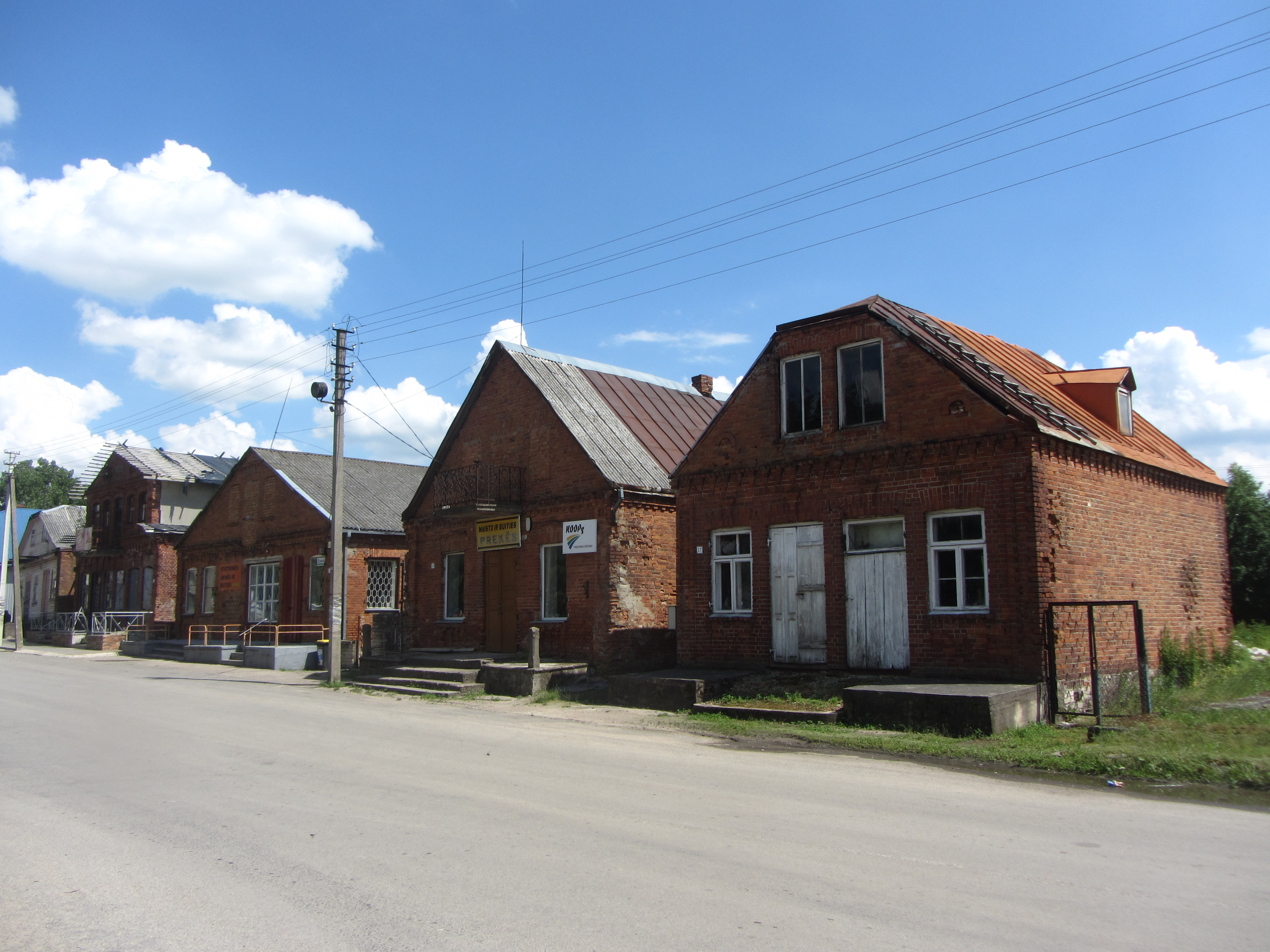
Butrimonys
