= List of Polish cities and towns damaged in World War II =

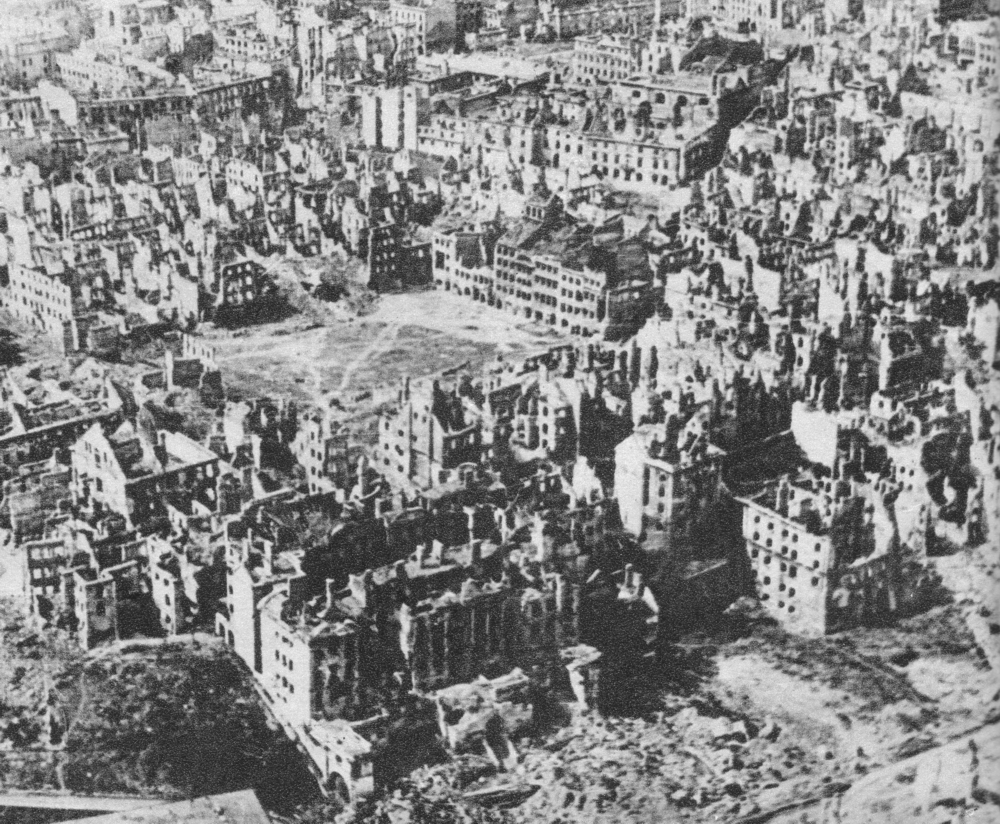
Ruined Warsaw in January 1945

As the German army retreated during the later stages of the Second World War, many of the urban areas of what is now Poland were severely damaged as a result of military action between the retreating forces of the German Wehrmacht and advancing ones of the Soviet Red Army. Other cities were deliberately destroyed by the German forces. One of the most famous of these planned destructions was the razing of Warsaw, the capital of Poland. While extensively damaged by the failed Warsaw Ghetto Uprising and Warsaw Uprising, the city later underwent a planned demolition by German forces under order from Adolf Hitler and high officials within the Nazi government. On 17 October 1944, SS chief Heinrich Himmler famously stated, "The city must completely disappear from the surface of the earth and serve only as a transport station for the Wehrmacht." Before they were stopped by the advancing Red Army, 85% of the city had been taken out. Warsaw was far from the worst off after the German retreat; 97% of Jasło and nearly 100% of Polanów were reduced to rubble. Other towns such as Wałcz fared better, with only a quarter of the city being destroyed. Various ancient historical buildings in Polish cities were not spared; for example, Trzemeszno's Romanesque basilica of 1130–1145 was burnt down in 1945.

| Polish name | German name | Pre-war location | coordinates | Damage | Details |
|---|---|---|---|---|---|
| Augustów | | Poland | | 70% | |
| Bartoszyce | Bartenstein | Germany | 54°15′N 20°49′E | 50% | |
| Białystok | Bialystok | Poland | | 70% | |
| Bielsk Podlaski | Bielsk Podlaski | Poland | — | 65% | |
| Bisztynek | Bischofstein | Germany | | | 20% of residential buildings, 15% of public buildings, 18% of industrial buildings destroyed |
| Bobolice | Bublitz | Germany | 53°57′N 16°35′E | 75% | |
| Bolesławiec | Bunzlau | Germany | 51°16′N 15°34′E | 60% | |
| Braniewo | Braunsberg | Germany | 54°23′N 19°49′E | 85% | |
| Brzeg | Brieg | Germany | 50°52′N 17°29′E | 70%–80% | |
| Bytom | Beuthen | Germany | | 12% | |
| Bytów | Bütow | Germany | | 70% | |
| Częstochowa | Tschenstochau | Poland | | 10% | |
| Dębica | Dębica | Poland | 50°03′N 21°25′E | 40% | |
| Dobiegniew | Woldenberg | Germany | 52°58′N 15°45′E | 85% | |
| Dobre Miasto | Guttstadt | Germany | 53°59′N 20°24′E | 65% | |
| Dobrzany | Jakobshagen | Germany | 53°21′N 15°26′E | 60% | |
| Dukla | Dukla | Poland | 49°34′N 21°41′E | 85% | |
| Elbląg | Elbing | Germany | 54°10′N 19°24′E | 60%–65% | |
| Ełk | Lyck | Germany | 53°50′N 22°21′E | 50% | |
| Frombork | Frauenburg | Germany | 54.357°N 19.681°E | 80% | |
| Garwolin | Garwolin | Poland | 51°54′N 21°37′E | 70% | |
| Gdańsk | Danzig | Danzig | 54°21′N 18°40′E | 65% | old town 80% |
| Gdynia | Gdingen | Poland | 54°30′N 18°33′E | 66% (Estimate) | |
| Gliwice | Gleiwitz | Germany | | 15% | |
| Głogów | Glogau | Germany | 51°40′N 16°05′E | 90%–95% | old town completely |
| Goleniów | Gollnow | Germany | 53°34′N 14°49′E | 60% | |
| Gołdap | Goldap | Germany | 54°18′58″N 22°18′34″E | 90% | |
| Goniądz | Gonionds | Poland | 53°29′N 22°44′E | 80% | |
| Gorzów Wielkopolski | Landsberg an der Warthe | Germany | | 50% | |
| Grudziądz | Graudenz | Poland | | 70% | |
| Gryfice | Greifenberg | Germany | 53°54′53″N 15°11′55″E | 40% | |
| Gryfino | Greifenhagen | Germany | 53°15′N 14°29′E | 70% | |
| Gubin | Guben | Germany | 51°57′N 14°43′E | 90% | |
| Iłża | Iłża | Poland | 51°10′0″N 21°15′0″E | — | |
| Inowrocław | Hohensalza | Poland | 52°48′N 18°16′E | 50% | |
| Jasło | Jassel | Poland | 49°45′N 21°28′E | 97% | |
| Jeziorany | Seeburg | Germany | | | 60% of residential buildings, 15% of public buildings, 21% of industrial buildings damaged or destroyed |
| Kałuszyn | Kałuszyn | Poland | 52°12′30″N 21°48′42″E | 85% | |
| Kamień Pomorski | Cammin | Germany | 53°58′N 14°46′E | 65% | |
| Kańczuga | Kańczuga | Poland | 49°59′02″N 22°24′31″E | 50% | |
| Kazimierz Dolny | Kazimierz Dolny | Poland | 51°19′N 21°57′E | — | |
| Kętrzyn | Rastenburg | Germany | 54°05′N 21°23′E | 50% | |
| Knyszyn | Knyszyn | Poland | 53°19′N 22°55′E | 80% | |
| Kolbuszowa | Kolbuszowa | Poland | 50°15′N 21°46′E | — | |
| Kołobrzeg | Kolberg | Germany | 54°11′N 15°35′E | 80%–90% | |
| Kostrzyn nad Odrą | Küstrin | Germany | 52°35′18″N 14°39′00″E | 90% | |
| Koszalin | Köslin | Germany | 54°12′N 16°11′E | 40% | |
| Kożuchów | Freystadt in Schlesien | Germany | 51°45′N 15°36′E | 70% | |
| Krosno Odrzańskie | Crossen an der Oder | Germany | 52°03′N 15°05′E | 65% | |
| Krzepice | Kschepitz | Poland | — | 50% | |
| Kuźnia Raciborska | Ratiborhammer | Germany | 50°13′N 18°18′E | 50% | |
| Kwidzyn | Marienwerder | Germany | 53°44′N 18°55′E | 50% | |
| Legnica | Liegnitz | Germany | 51°13′N 16°10′E | 60% | |
| Leśna | Marklissa | Germany | 51°01′25″N 15°16′00″E | — | |
| Lidzbark Warmiński | Heilsberg | Germany | | 45% | |
| Lubań | Lauban | Germany | 51°07′N 15°18′E | 60% | |
| Lubin | Lüben | Germany | 51°24′N 16°12′E | 70% | |
| Lublin | Lublin | Poland | 51°24′N 22°57′E | — | |
| Łomża | Lomscha | Poland | 53°11′N 22°05′E | 70% | |
| Łódź | Lodz | Poland | | | 40% of industry destroyed |
| Malbork | Marienburg in Westpreußen | Germany | 54°02′N 19°03′E | 45% | |
| Namysłów | Namslau | Germany | | 50% | |
| Nidzica | Neidenburg | Germany | 53°22′N 20°26′E | 40% | |
| Oleśnica | Oels | Germany | | 80% | |
| Olsztyn | Allenstein | Germany | | 50% | |
| Opole | Oppeln | Germany | 50°40′N 17°56′E | 50%–60% | |
| Ostrołęka | Ostrolenka | Poland | 53°05′N 21°35′E | — | |
| Ostróda | Osterode in Ostpreußen | Germany | 53°42′N 19°59′E | 60% (Estimate) | |
| Piła | Schneidemühl | Germany | 53°09′N 16°44′E | 75% | |
| Pisz | Johannisburg | Germany | | 70% | |
| Polanów | Pollnow | Germany | 54°06′N 16°42′E | 90%–100% | |
| Poznań | Posen | Poland | 49°47′10″N 22°46′26″E | 55% (Estimate) | |
| Przemyśl | Premissel | Poland | 54°15′N 20°49′E | 40% | |
| Pułtusk | Pultusk | Poland | | 70% | |
| Racibórz | Ratibor | Germany | | 60% | |
| Reszel | Rößel | Germany | | | 20% of residential and industrial buildings, 14% of public buildings destroyed |
| Rybnik | Rybnik | Poland | | 25% | |
| Rzepin | Reppen | Germany | 52°21′N 14°50′E | 85% | |
| Siedlce | | Poland | | 50% | |
| Skarżysko-Kamienna | | Poland | | | 60% of industry destroyed |
| Słupsk | Stolp | Germany | | 35% | |
| Stargard | Stargard in Pommern | Germany | 53°20′N 15°03′E | 70% | |
| Susz | Rosenberg in Westpreußen | Germany | | | 60% of residential buildings, 33% of public buildings, 21% of industrial buildings destroyed |
| Suwałki | Sudauen | Poland | 54°5′N 22°56′E | 30–35% | about 20% was caused by Soviet forces, remaining 10–15% by German occupation of Suwałki |
| Syców | Groß Wartenberg | Germany | | 50% | |
| Szczecin | Stettin | Germany | 53°25′N 14°35′E | 63%–65% | port and industry 95% |
| Szczytno | Ortelsburg | Germany | | 43%–47% | most significant historic buildings survived |
| Ścinawa | Steinau | Germany | | 75% | |
| Świdnica | Schweidnitz | Germany | | | 50% of industry destroyed |
| Świnoujście | Swinemünde | Germany | 53°55′N 14°15′E | 55% | |
| Tomaszów Mazowiecki | | Poland | | 25% | |
| Trzemeszno | Tremessen | Poland | 52°33′31″N 17°49′09″E | — | Romanesque basilica of 1130–45 burnt down in 1945 |
| Wałcz | Deutsch Krone | Germany | 53°16′N 16°28′E | 25% | |
| Warsaw | Warschau | Poland | 52°13′48″N 21°00′39″E | 85% | See: destruction of Warsaw |
| Węgorzewo | Angerburg | Germany | 54°13′N 21°45′E | 80% | |
| Wodzisław Śląski | Loslau | Poland | 50°00′N 18°27′E | 80% | |
| Wolin | Wollin | Germany | 53°55′N 14°30′E | 70% | |
| Wolsztyn | Wollstein | Poland | 52°07′N 16°07′E | — | Classicist castle of 1845 burnt down in 1945 |
| Wrocław | Breslau | Germany | 51°07′N 17°02′E | 70% | |
| Zabłudów | Zabłudów | Poland | 53°01′N 23°21′E | 85% (Estimate) | |
| Zakroczym | Zakroczym | Poland | 52°26′16″N 20°36′43″E | 80% | |
| Złoczew | Złoczew | Poland | 51°25′N 18°36′E | 80% | |
| Złotów | Flatow | Germany | | 30% | |
| Żagań | Sagan | Germany | 51°37′N 15°19′E | 55%–60% | |
| Żary | Sorau | Germany | 51°38′N 15°08′E | 60% | |
| Żelechów | Żelechów | Poland | 51°48′N 21°54′E | — | |
| Żory | Sohrau | Poland | 50°03′N 18°42′E | 80% | |
| Żychlin | Żychlin | Poland | 52°14′43″N 19°37′25″E | 40% (Estimate) | |

== Gallery ==
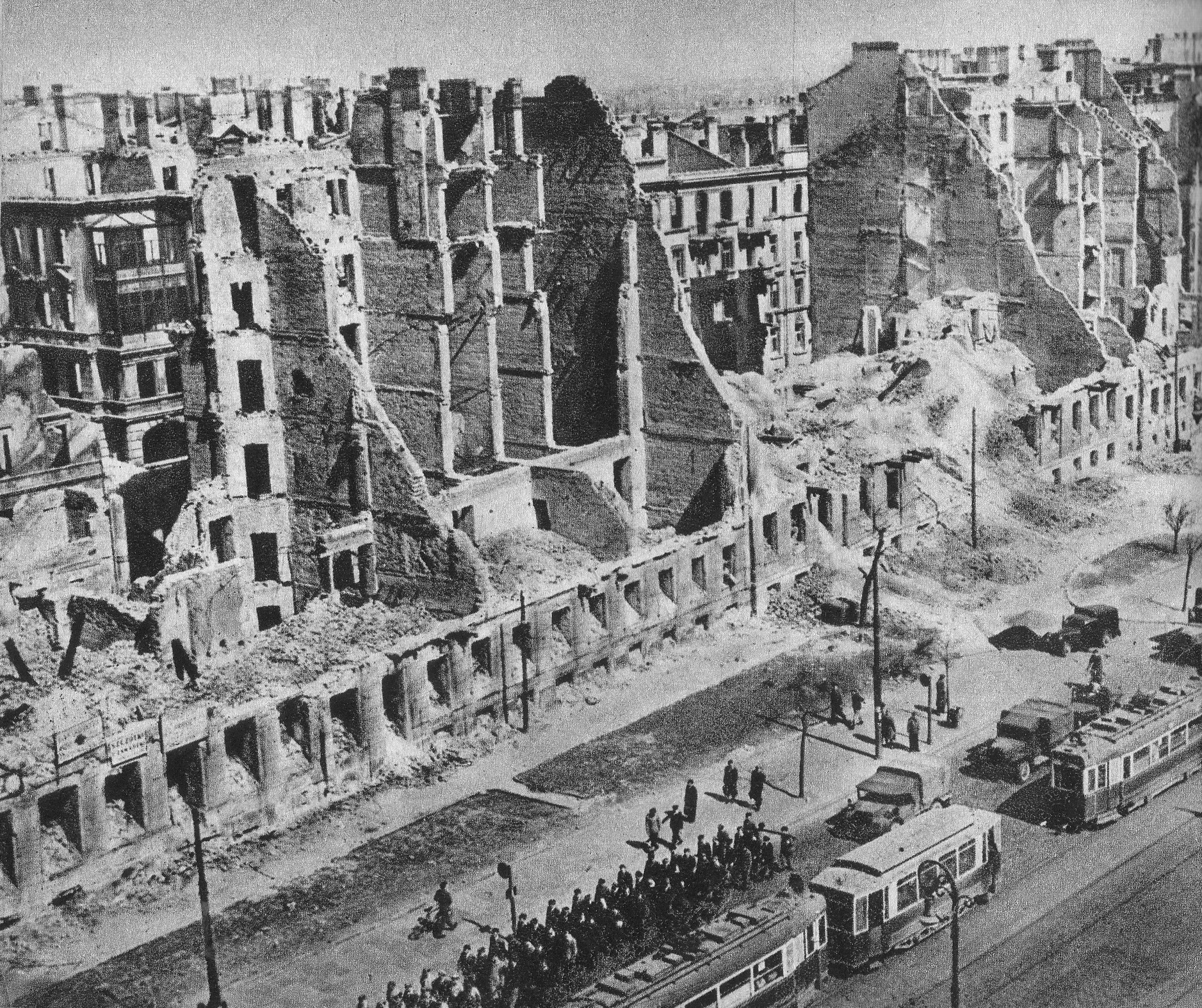
Warsaw

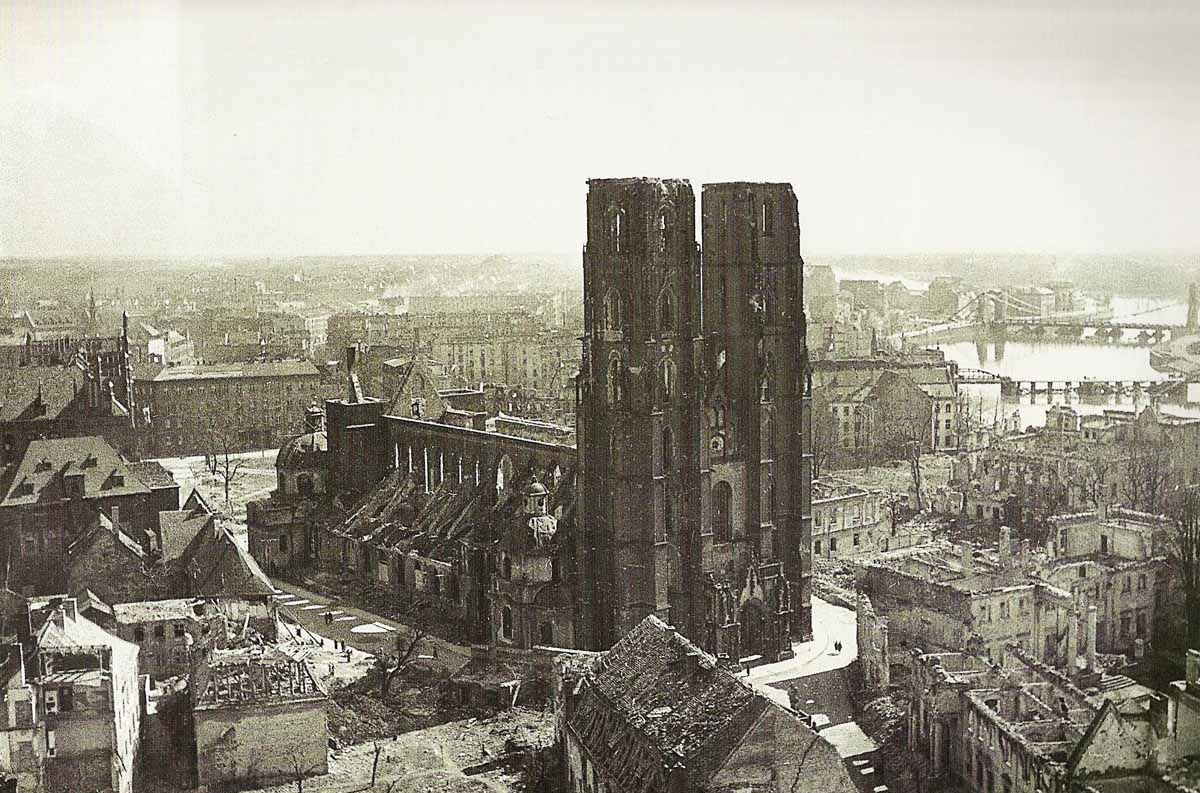
Wrocław

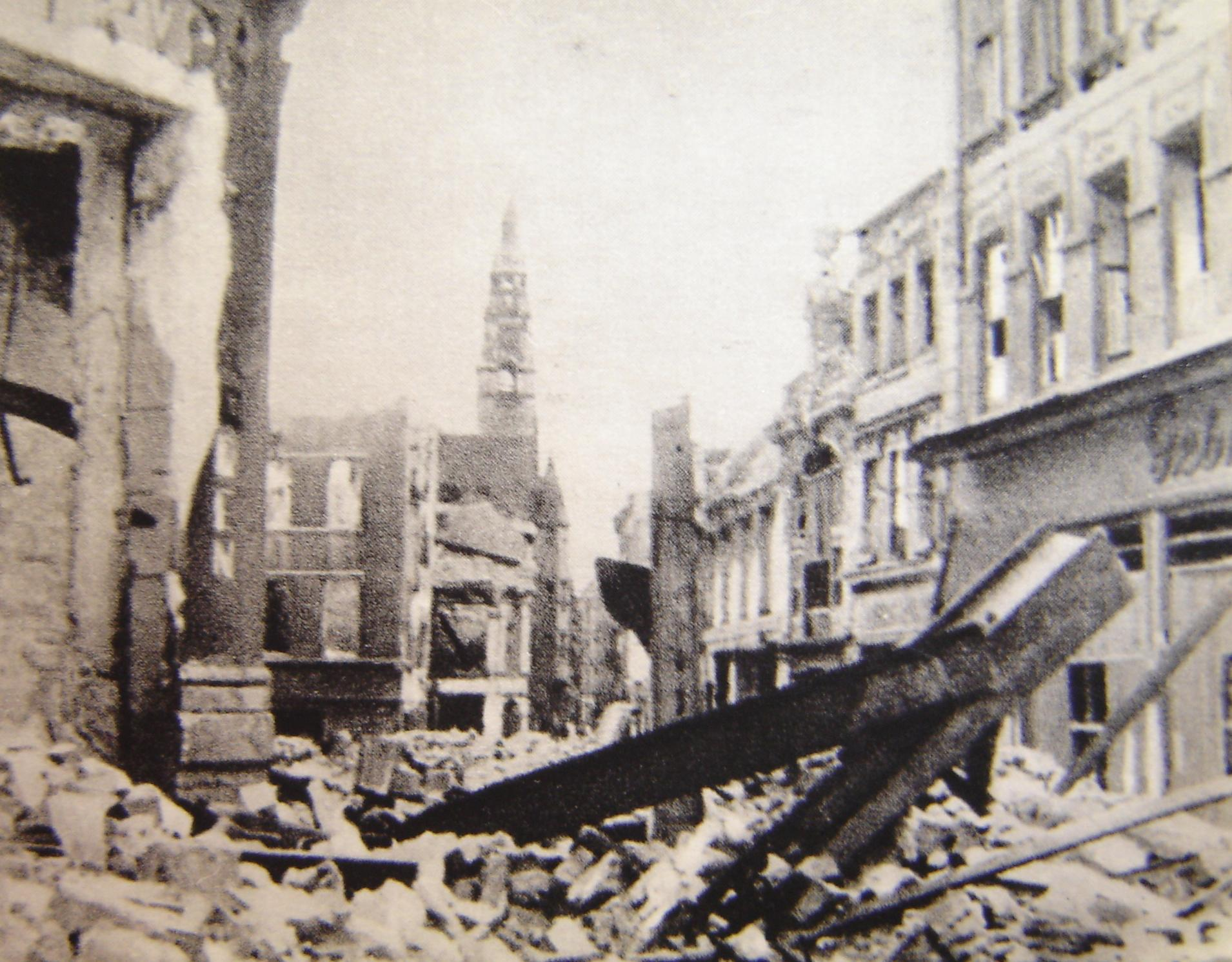
Szczecin

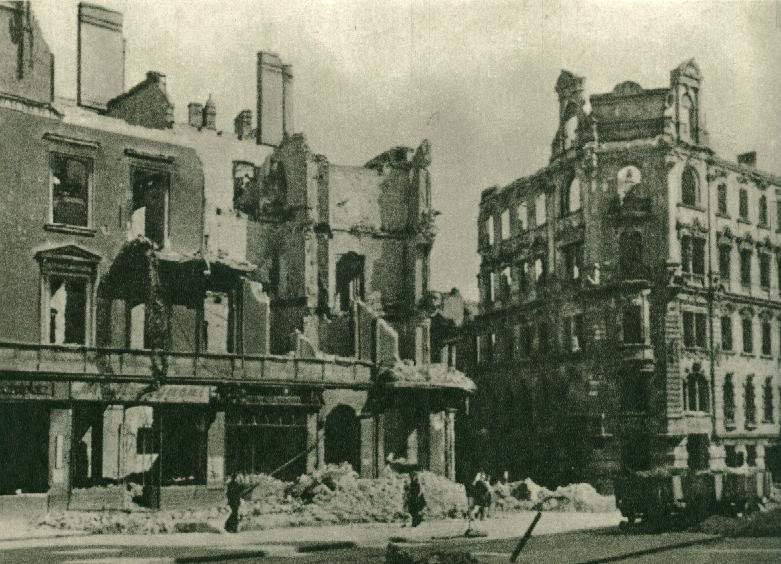
Poznań

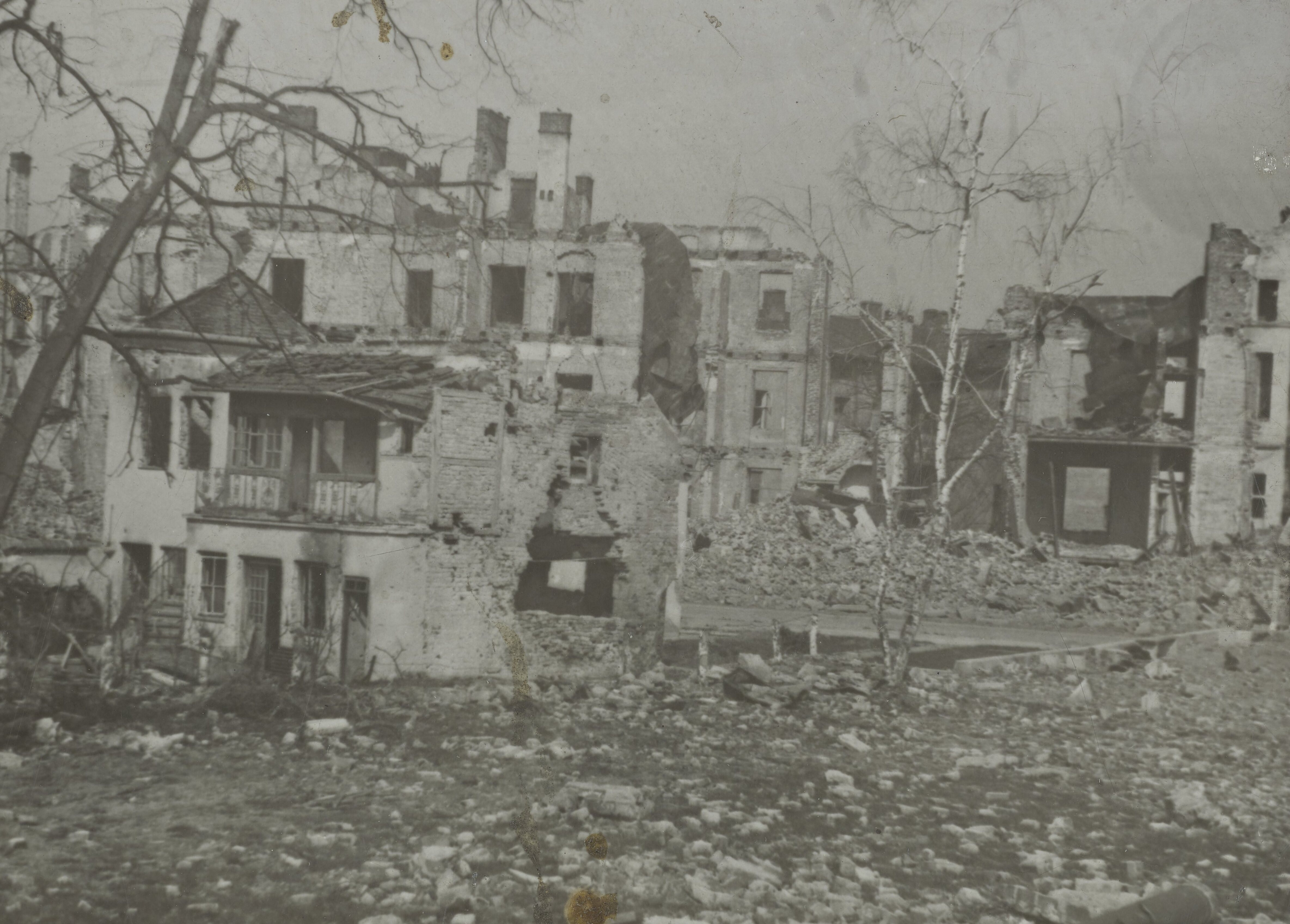
Jasło

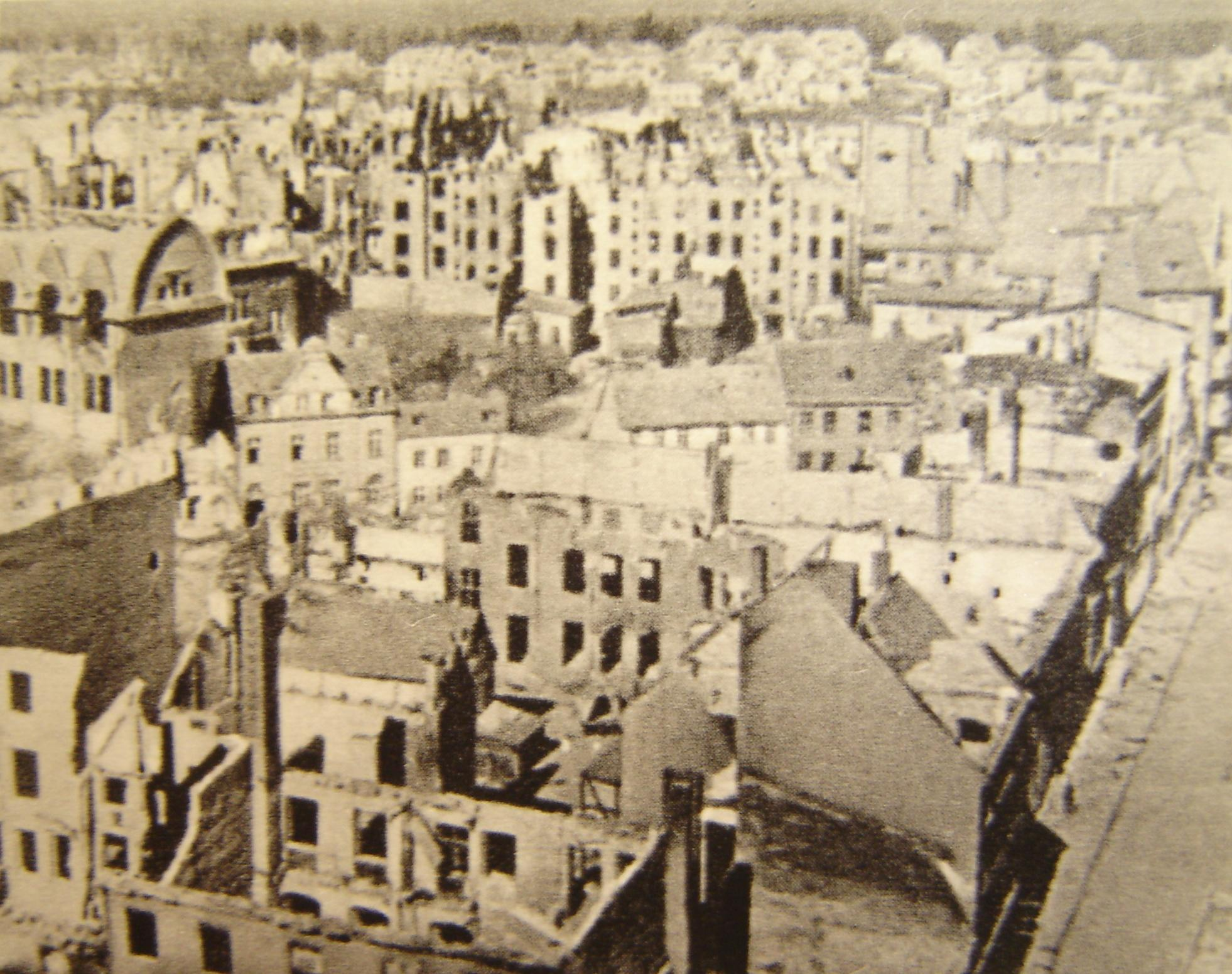
Kołobrzeg

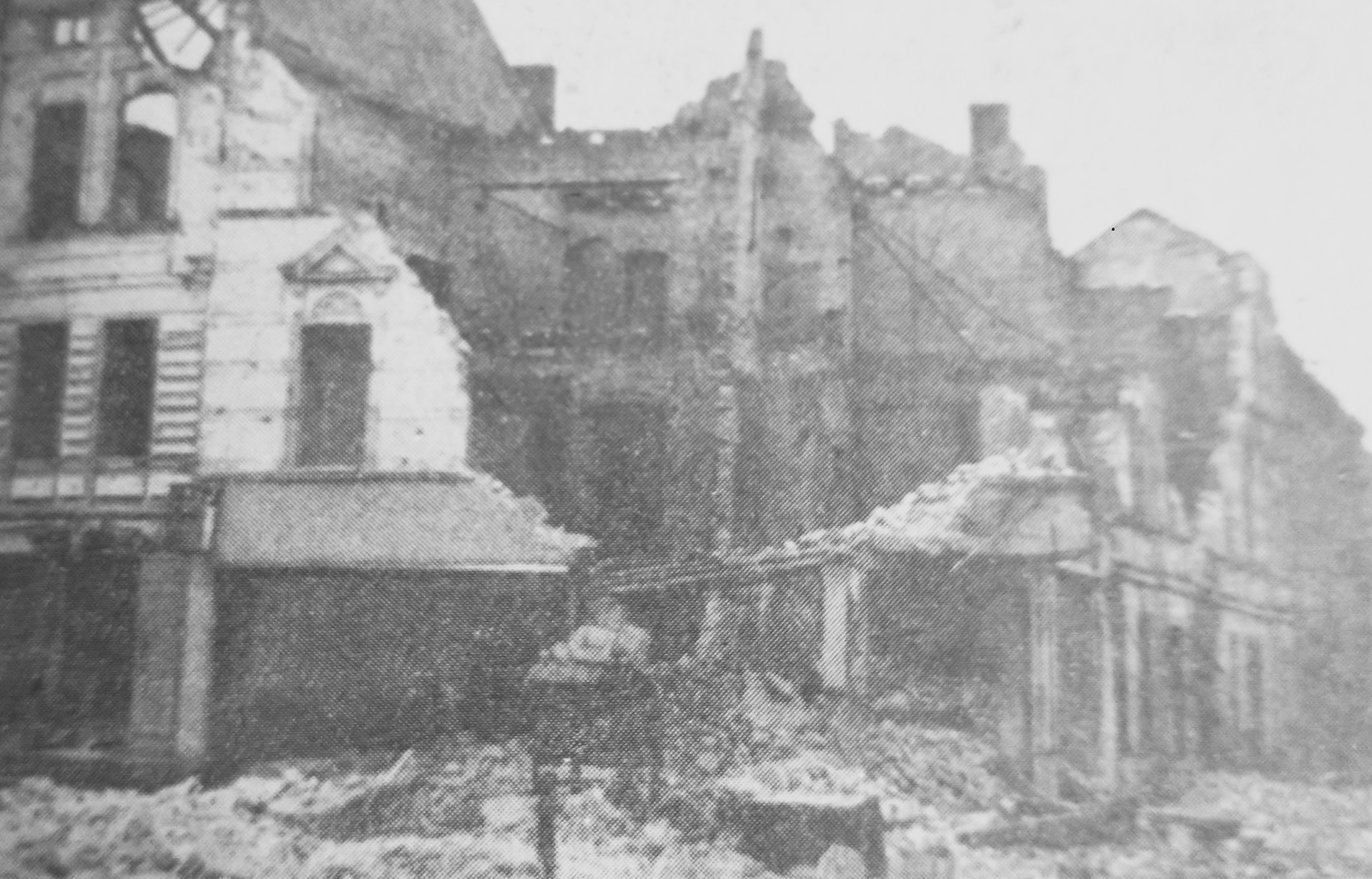
Piła

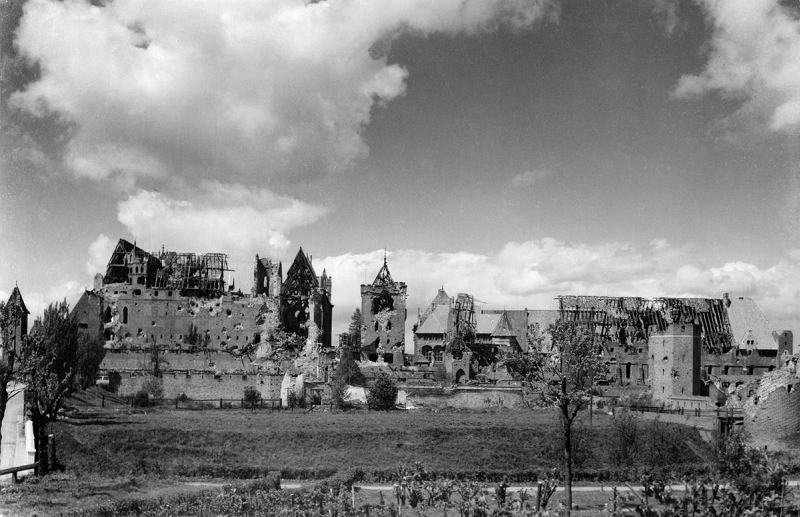
Malbork

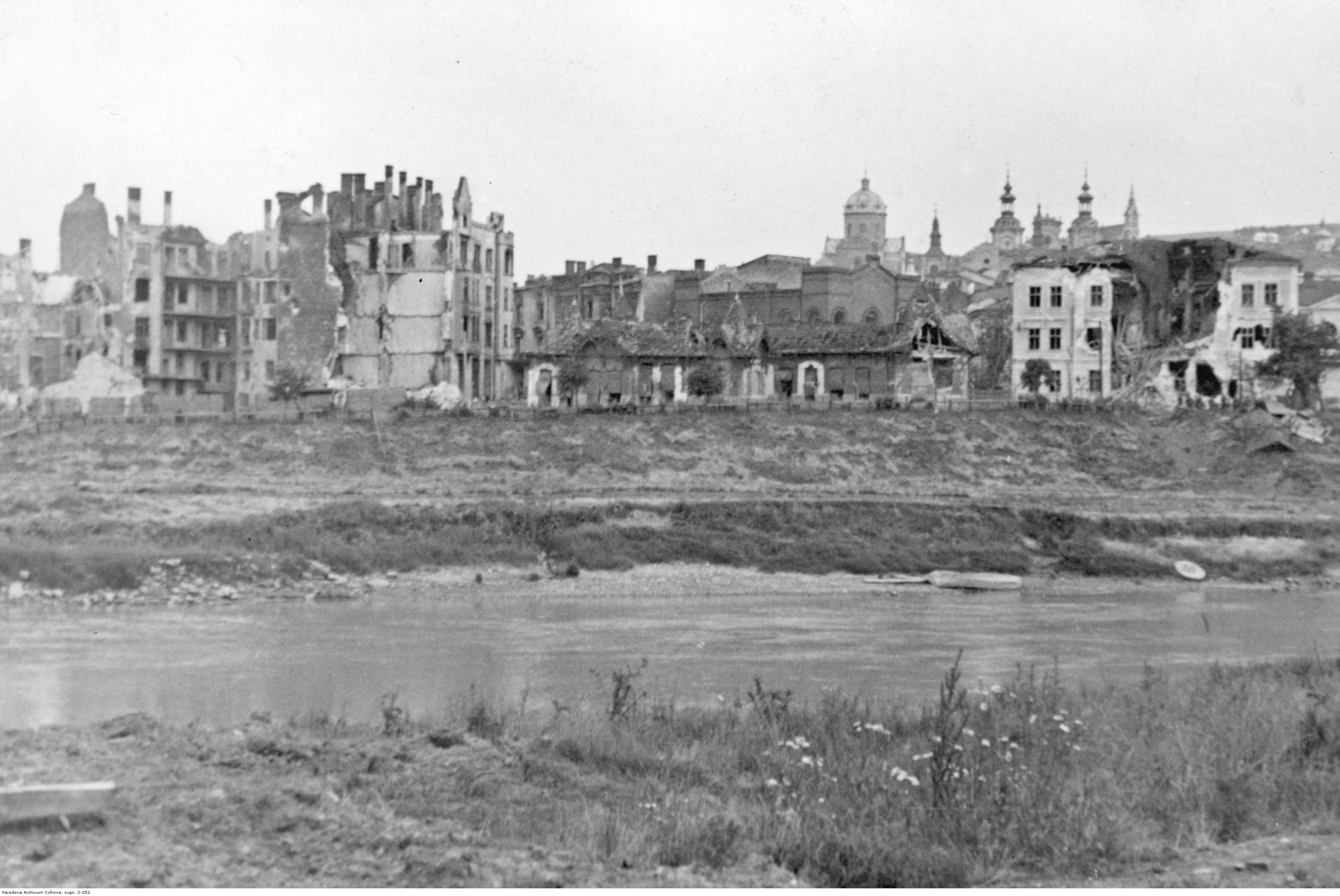
Przemyśl

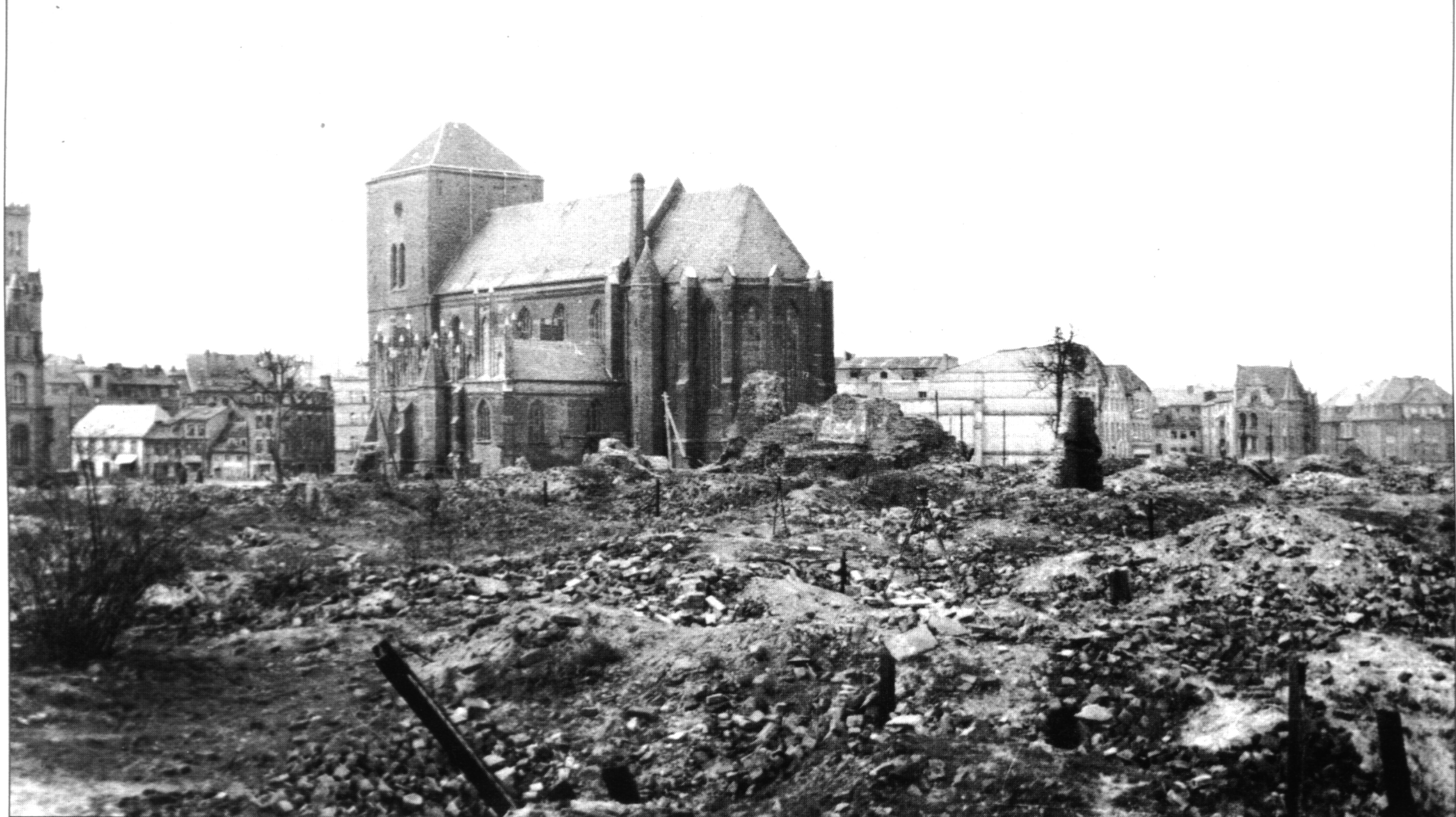
Słupsk

== See also ==
- List of former cities of Poland
- Planned destruction of Warsaw
- Strategic bombing during World War II
- Bombing of Wiener Neustadt in World War II
