= Alfred Partikel =

German painter

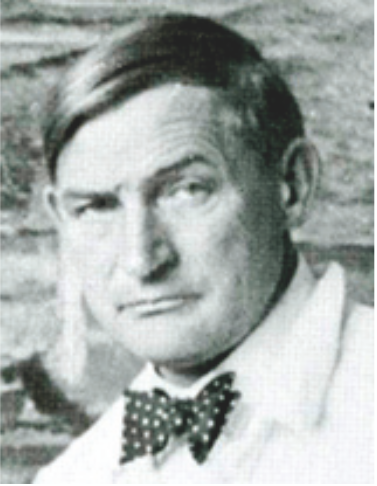
- Born: 7 October 1888; Goldap, East Prussia
- Disappeared: 20 October 1945 (aged 57); Darß, Germany
- Status: Missing for 80 years, 9 months and 1 day
- Occupation: Painter

Ernst Fritz Alfred Partikel (7 October 1888 – disappeared 20 October 1945) was a German painter.

== Biography ==
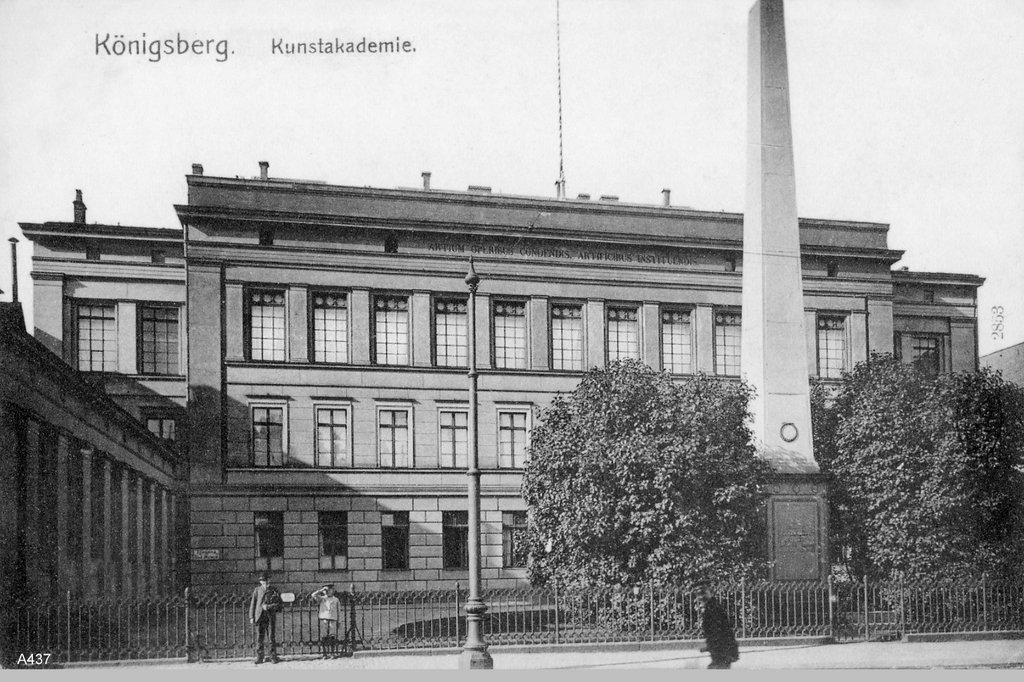
Königsberg academy of arts, where Partikel was a Professor from 1929 to 1944

Partikel was born in Goldap, East Prussia and grew up in Szittkehmen. He attended school in Insterburg and studied at the academy of arts in Königsberg in 1905–07. In 1908 he moved to Munich and in 1910 to Weimar to study at the Weimar school of arts.

Partikel worked in Berlin in 1911 until 1921 and served in the German Army in World War I. In 1921 he moved to Ahrenshoop on the Baltic Sea.

He became a Professor for landscape painting at the Königsberg academy of arts in 1929 and was a guest of the Villa Massimo in Rome in 1930/31. He was a member of Max Pechstein's "artist's Colony" of Nidden. His works were classified as "entartete Kunst" in 1937.

== Disappearance ==
In February 1945, Partikel fled on bicycle from Königsberg to Ahrenshoop. He disappeared while picking mushrooms in the woods near Ahrenshoop on 20 October 1945. His remains were never found. There is a memorial stone dedicated to him in Ahrenshoop, donated by his friend and fellow artist Gerhard Marcks.

== See also ==
- List of people who disappeared
