= Žeimelis =

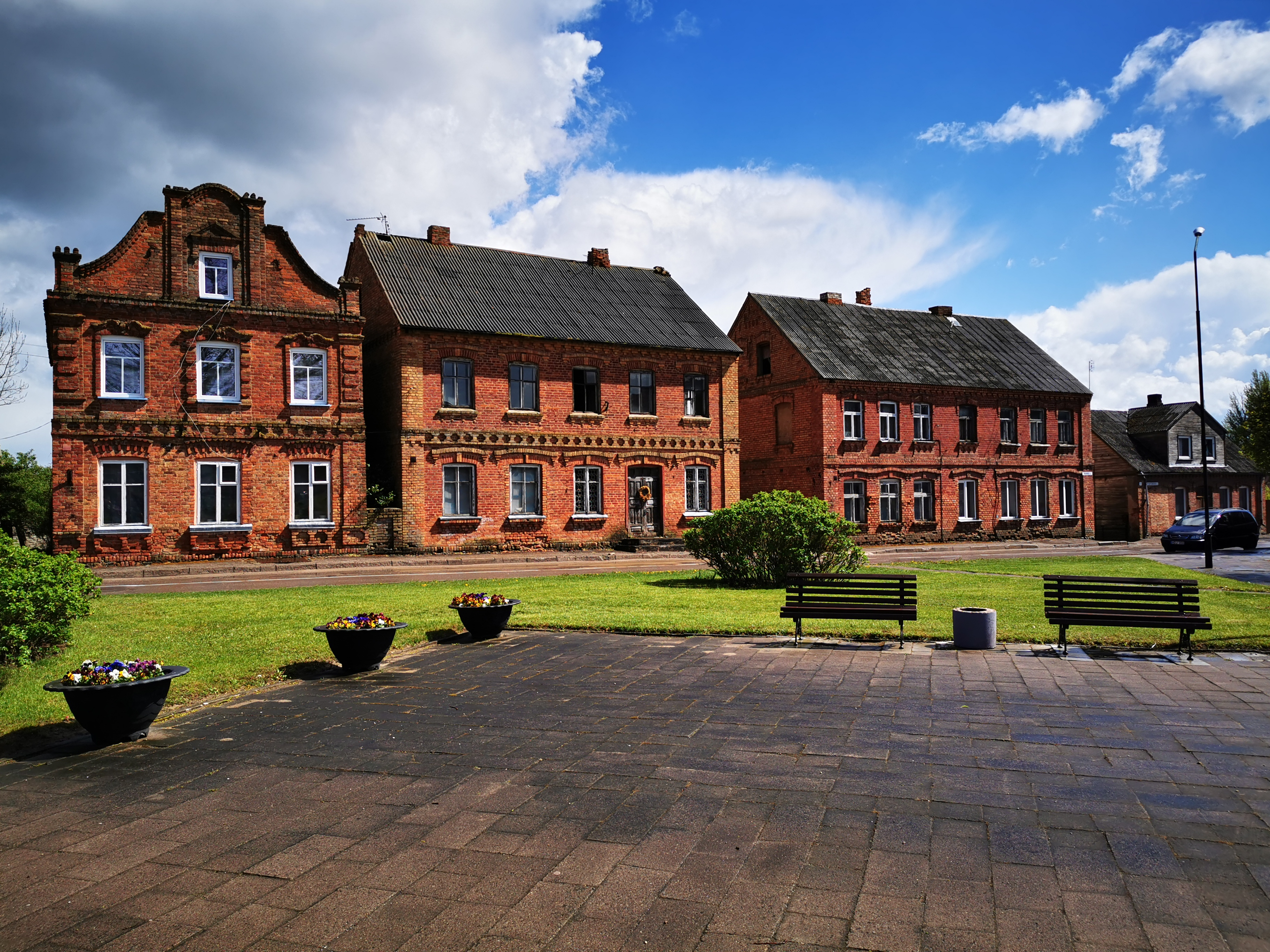

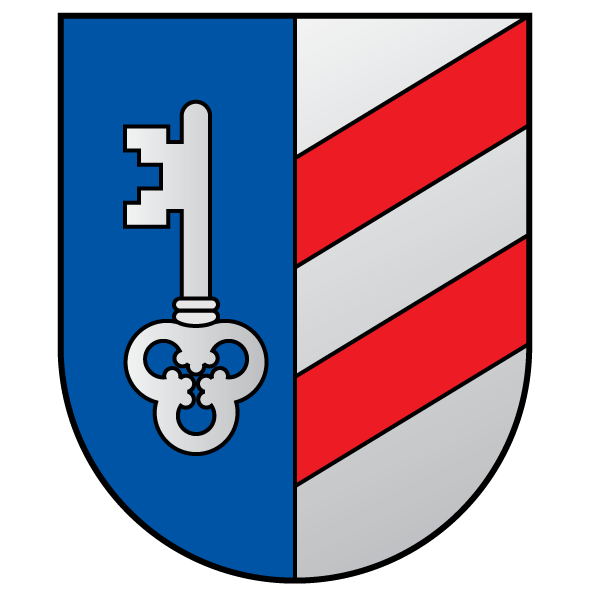
- Coat of arms

- Location of Žeimelis
- Coordinates: 56°16′N 23°59′E
- Country: Lithuania
- Ethnographic region: Aukštaitija
- County: Šiauliai County
- Municipality: Pakruojis District Municipality
- Capital of: Žeimelis elderate
- First mentioned: 1500

Population (2011)
  - Total: 953
- Time zone: UTC+2 (EET)
  - Summer (DST): UTC+3 (EEST)

Žeimelis is a small town in northern Lithuania, 40 km to the north from Pakruojis, near the border with Latvia. It is a centre of an elderate. According to a census in 2011, Žeimelis had 953 residents. Town of Žeimelis is a state-protected urbanistic monument. The town of Žeimelis has a town square with inns from the 18th and 19th centuries; the inns were adjusted for defensive needs as well. Žeimelis has museum of Semigallia.

== History ==
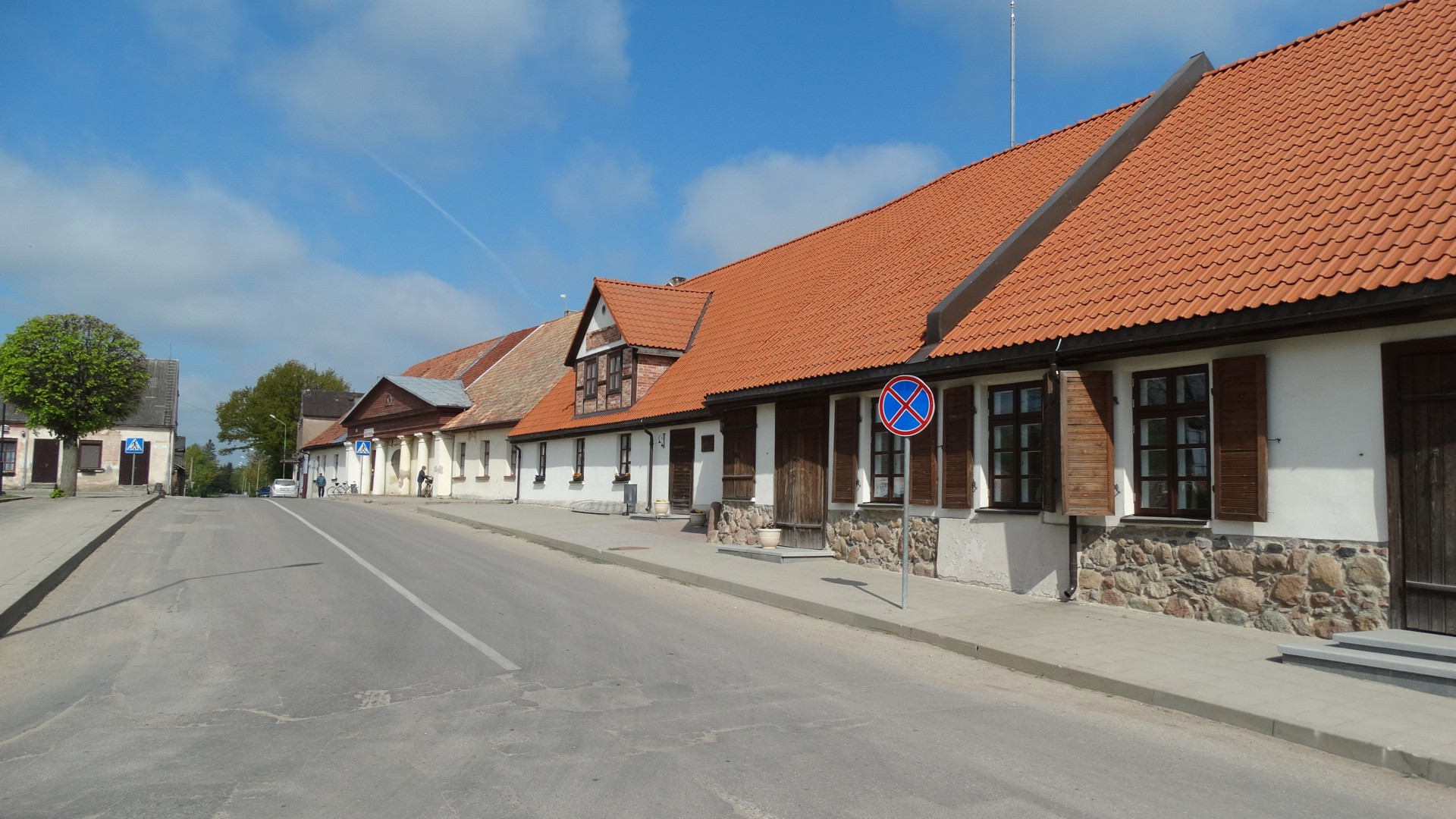
Old taverns in Žeimelis

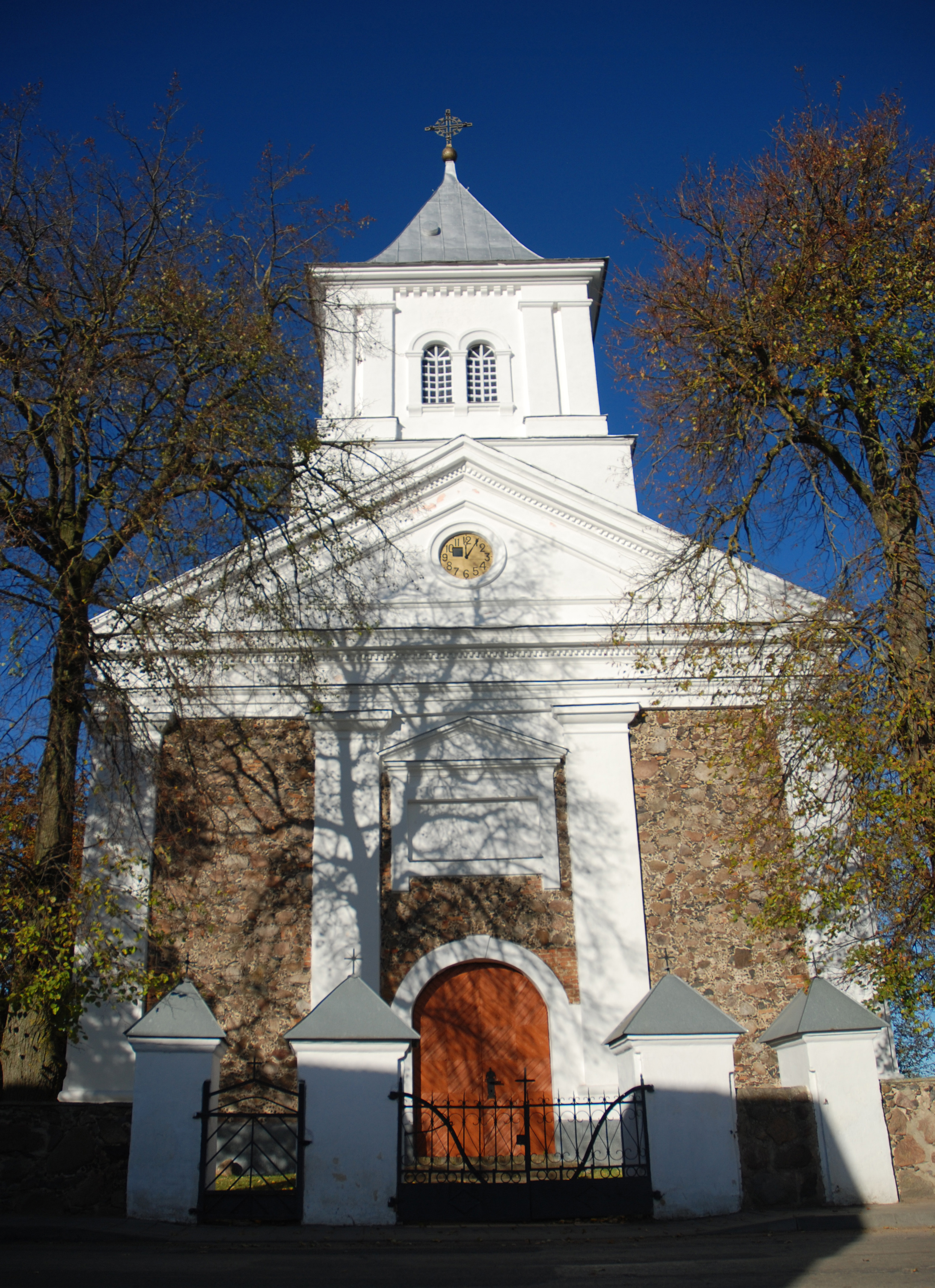
Church of St. Peter and St. Paul in Žeimelis

The lands were inhabited by the Baltic tribe Semigallians. Žeimelis manor was first mentioned in 1500. In 1542 Žeimelis was known as a town. In 1592–1674 school of reformats was operating. Since the 17th century Žeimelis was a place of big markets.

Field Marshal Michael Andreas Barclay de Tolly was baptized in the Lutheran church on 27 December 1761. The high school was established in 1920. An agriculture school was founded in 1937.

In August 1941, a total of 160 Jews from Žeimelis were murdered by an Einsatzgruppe. The mass execution was perpetrated by Germans and local collaborators. One of these massacres occurred on 8 August 1941. 59 Jews were murdered on that day. The victims were allegedly buried in Veleisiai.

After the Soviet occupation, Lithuanian partisans from Prisikėlimas military district were active in Žeimelis and its surroundings.

== Famous people ==
- Abraham Isaac Kook, chief rabbi of Palestine, and philosopher of religious Zionism.
- Liebegott Otto Conrad Schultz (1772 - 1840)
- Theodor Grotthuss, the originator of the first law of photochemistry, author of the first theory of electrolysis
- Juozas Šliavas, historian
- Julius Juzeliūnas, composer
