= Onuškis Manor =

Manor house in Lithuania

Coordinates: 56°08′20″N 25°31′53″E

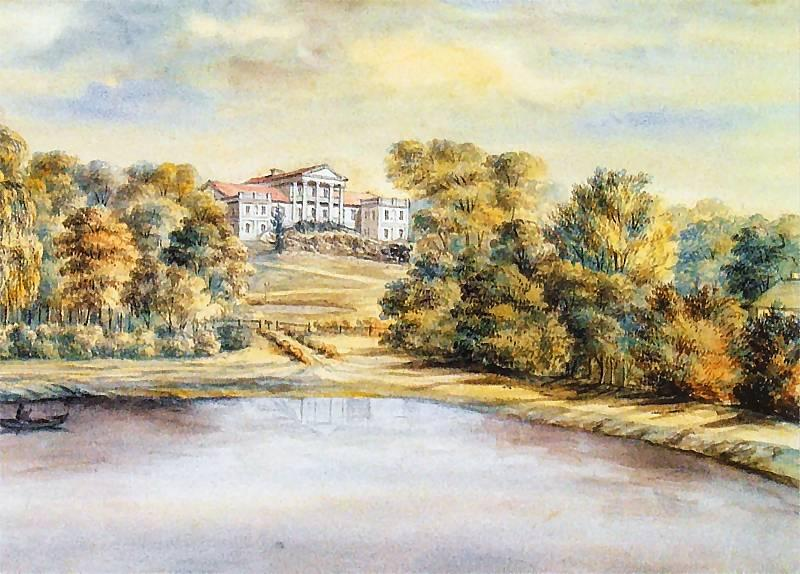
Onuškis Manor (1875–1876)

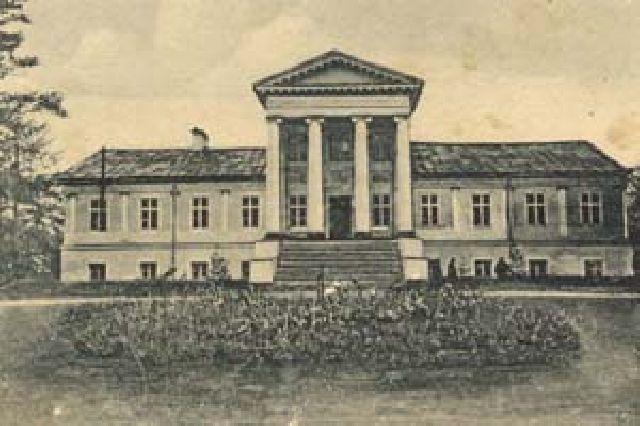
Onuškis Manor before World War I

Onuškis Manor is a former residential manor in Onuškis village, Rokiškis district. The manor was heavily damaged during World War I and currently only ruins remain.
