= Erich Sack =

German resistance member (1887–1943)

- Born: 1 April 1887; Goldap, East Prussia
- Died: 24 January 1943 (aged 55); Dachau Concentration Camp, Germany
- Occupation: Pastor

Erich Sack (1 April 1887 – 24 January 1943) was a German Lutheran Pastor and resistance fighter against the Nazis.

Sack was born in Goldap, East Prussia (today Gołdap, Poland), and studied Lutheran theology at the University of Königsberg. He started to work as a pastor at the Parish of St. Anschar and the Bethlehem Hospital in Eppendorf, Hamburg. In 1914 he returned to East Prussia and became a pastor with the Evangelical State Church of Prussia's older Provinces in Lyck (Ełk). In 1924 he moved to Pillkallen (Dobrovolsk) and in 1927 to Lasdehnen (Krasnoznamensk). After the Nazis took over power in Germany, he opposed the Nazi-influenced "German Christians" and joined the Confessing Church. In 1942 he was arrested by the Gestapo, accused of "weakening the resistibility of the German people" after Sack had expressed his concerns about the German victory in a confirmation lesson.

Sack died in the Dachau concentration camp on 24 January 1943.
