= Gołdap =

Town in Warmian-Masurian Voivodeship, Poland

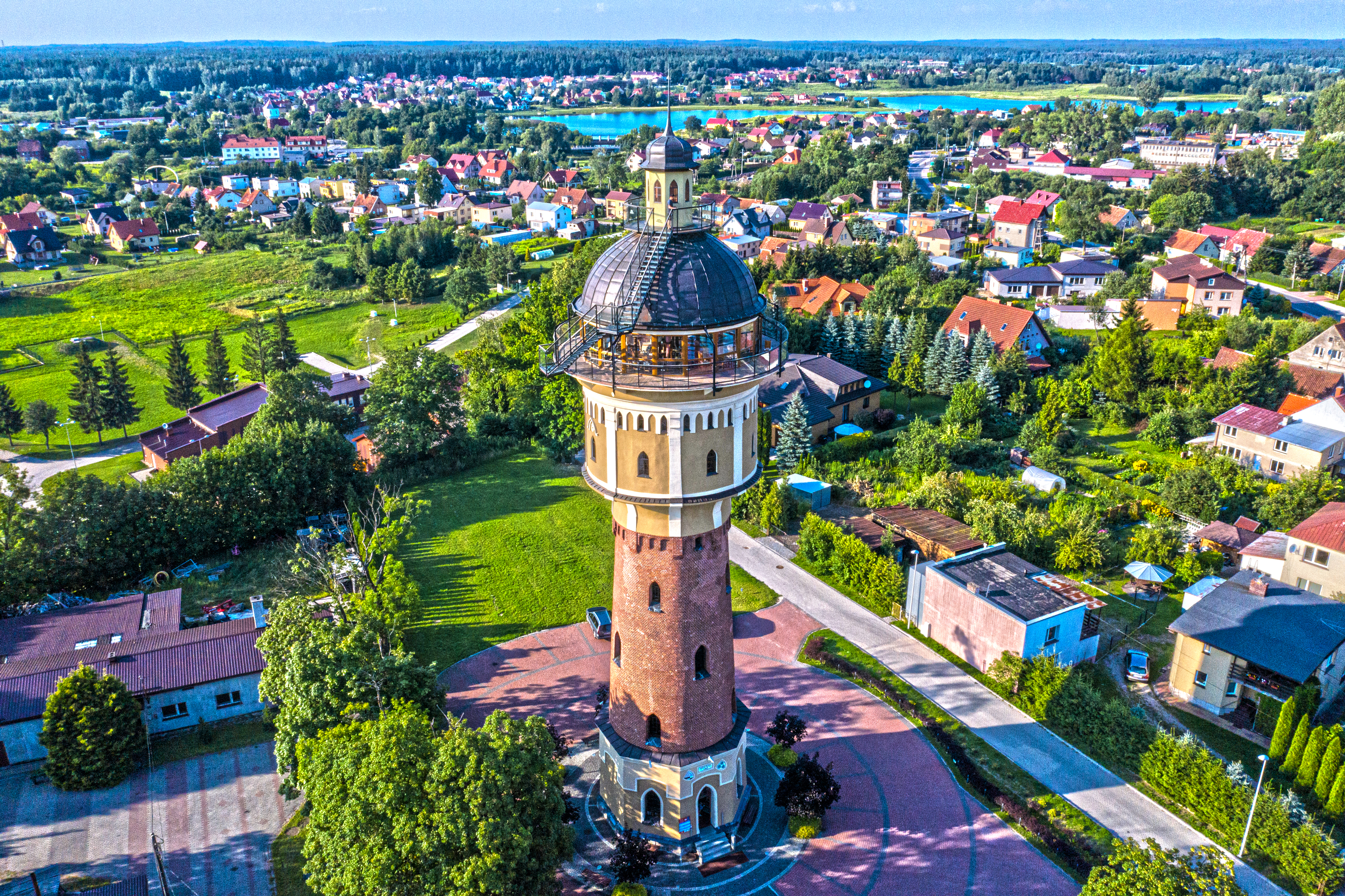
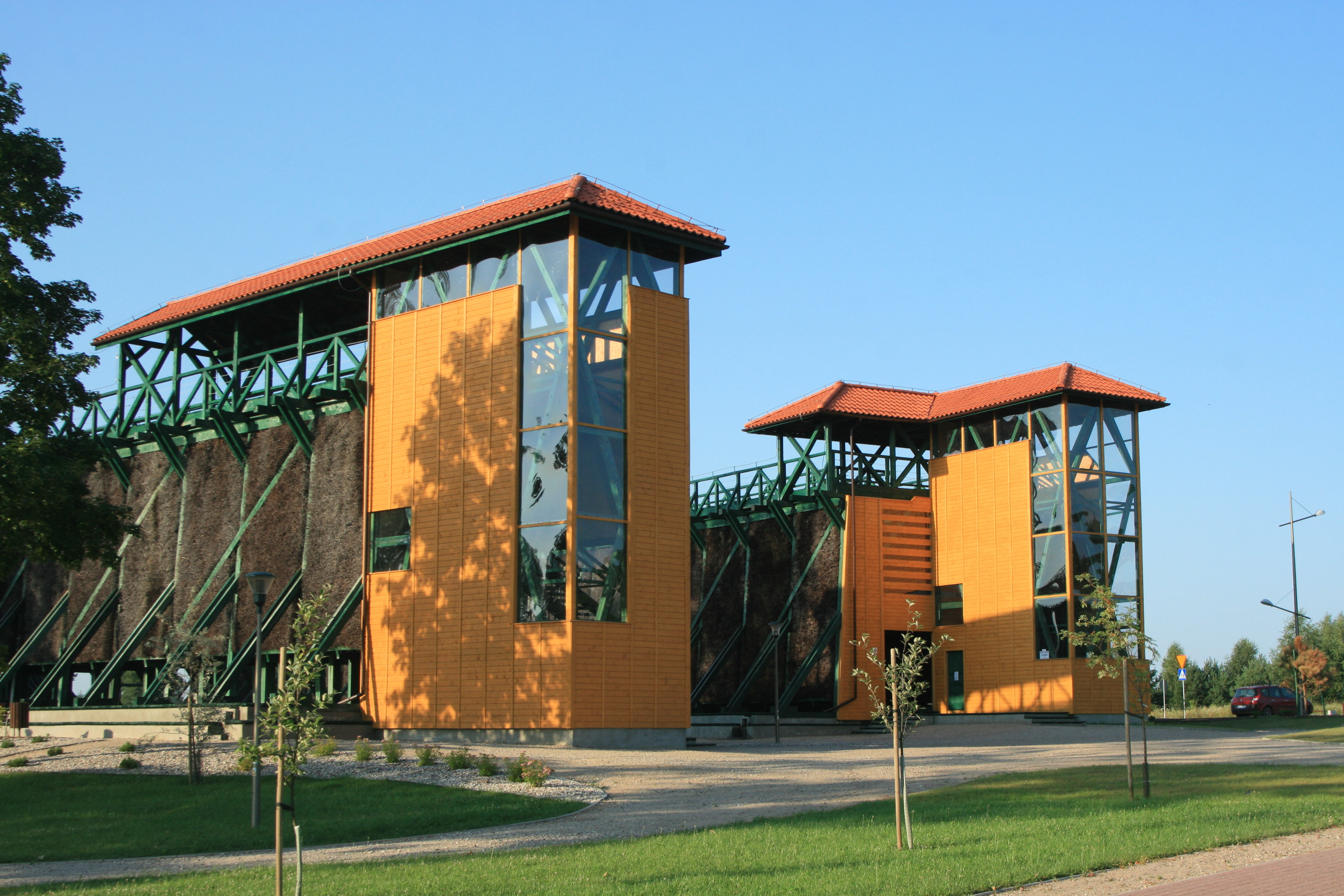
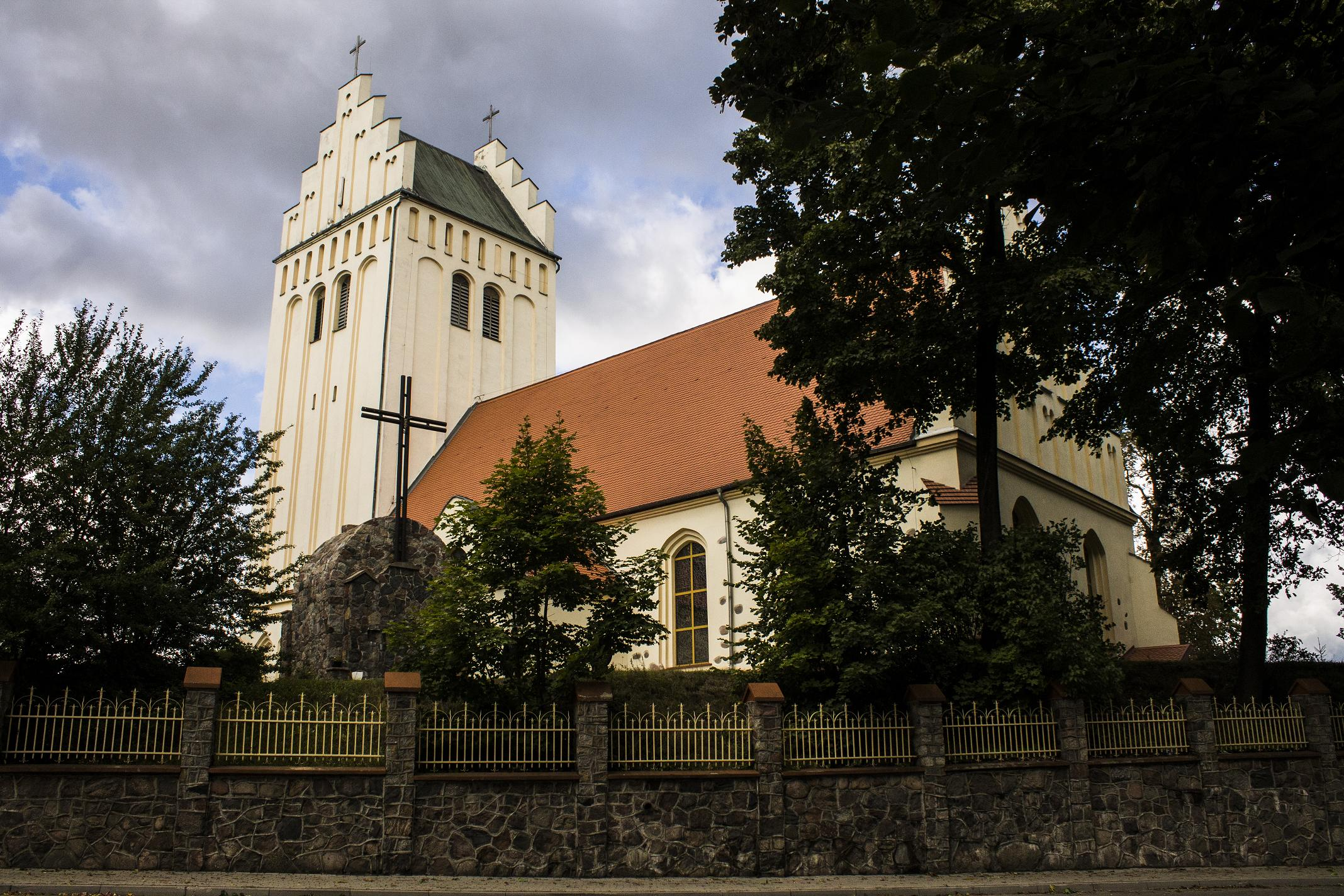
- Water tower Graduation towers Co-cathedral

- Flag Coat of arms

- Location within Poland
- Coordinates: 54°18′58″N 22°18′34″E
- Country: Poland
- Voivodeship: Warmian-Masurian
- County: Gołdap
- Gmina: Gołdap
- Founded: 1565
- Town rights: 1570

Government
  - Mayor: Konrad Kazaniecki

Area
  - Total: 17.2 km^{2} (6.6 sq mi)

Population (2007)
  - Total: 15,600
  - Density: 907/km^{2} (2,350/sq mi)
- Time zone: UTC+1 (CET)
  - Summer (DST): UTC+2 (CEST)
- Postal code: 19-500
- Area code: +48 87
- Car plates: NGO
- Website: www.goldap.pl

Gołdap (Polish pronunciation: [ˈɡɔwdap]; German: Goldap [ˈɡɔldap] or variant Goldapp; Lithuanian: Geldupė, Geldapė, Galdapė) is a spa town in northeastern Poland, in the region of Masuria, seat of Gołdap County in the Warmian-Masurian Voivodeship. It is located on the Gołdapa River, between the Szeskie Hills, Gołdap Lake and the Puszcza Romincka forest. It has a population of 15,600 (as of 2007).

== History ==
=== Early history ===
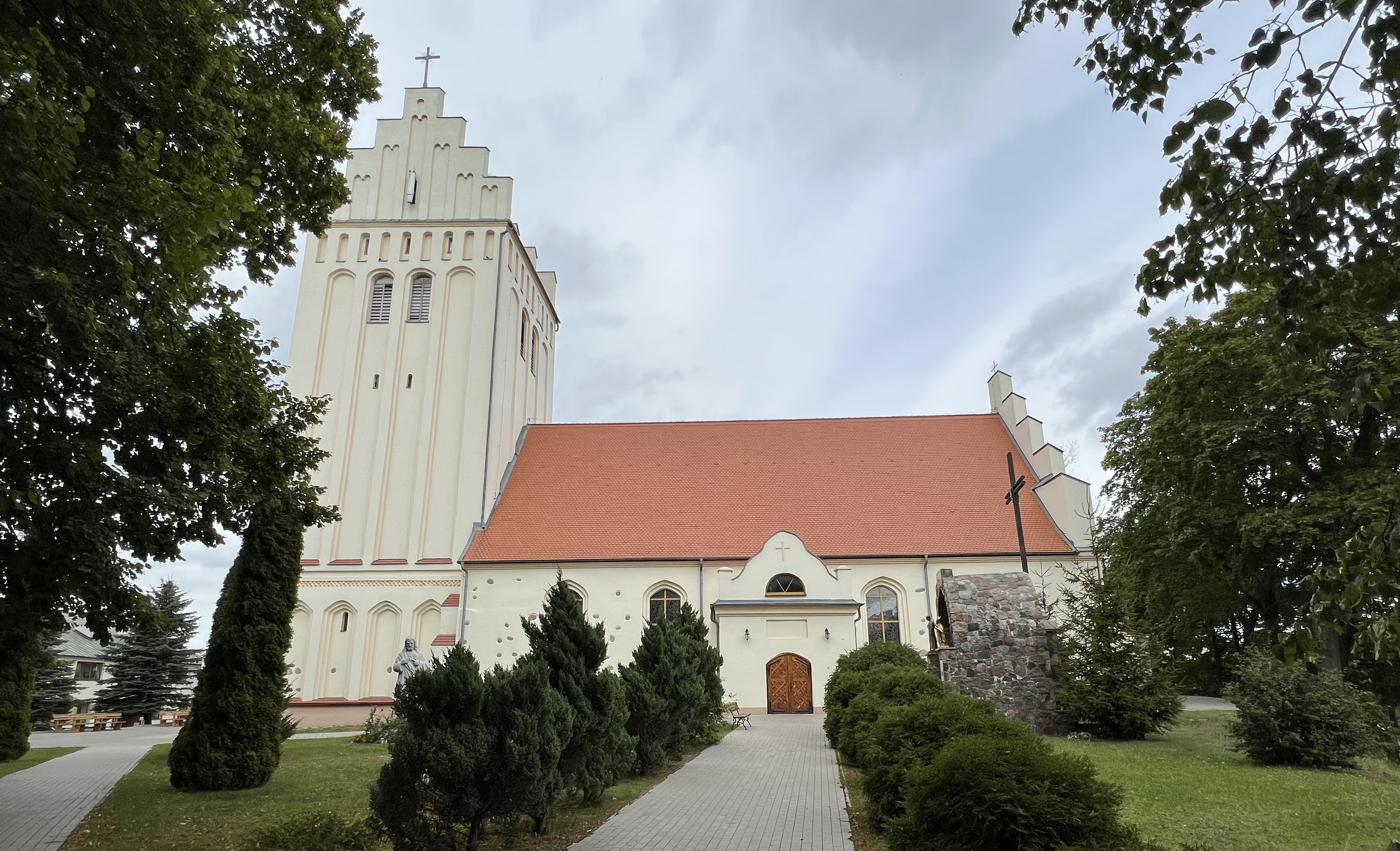
Mater Ecclesiae Co-cathedral

The settlement was founded in 1565, while it was part of Ducal Prussia, a fief and part of the Kingdom of Poland. In 1570 it was granted Chełmno town rights with weekly markets on Mondays and four annual fairs by Duke Albert Frederick. The charter granted fishing, brewing and trading privileges, as well as the right to build market stalls, a brickyard and a lime kiln, and established the coat of arms. The plan was to settle 100 Polish families from Mazovia, but 350 arrived, resulting in an additional expansion of the town. The coat of arms depicts the House of Hohenzollern and Brandenburg, while the letter "S" stands for Sigismund II Augustus, King of Poland, who was the suzerain of the region.

The town had a rough start due to natural disasters and competition from other towns. In 1583, 10 residents staged a rebellion against the mayor. The population was mainly engaged in crafts and trade, as well as agriculture, animal husbandry and beekeeping. In 1656, during the Polish-Swedish War, Polish troops under command of Dymitr Jerzy Wiśniowiecki were stationed in Gołdap. In the 17th and 18th centuries, the town suffered several fires and was plundered by Tatars and Cossacks.

=== 18th and 19th centuries ===
The town became a part of the Kingdom of Prussia in 1701 and Germany in 1871. Between 1757 and 1762 it was occupied by Russians. As of c. 1790, the most numerous groups of craftsmen were shoemakers, potters, tanners, tailors, brewers and distillers.

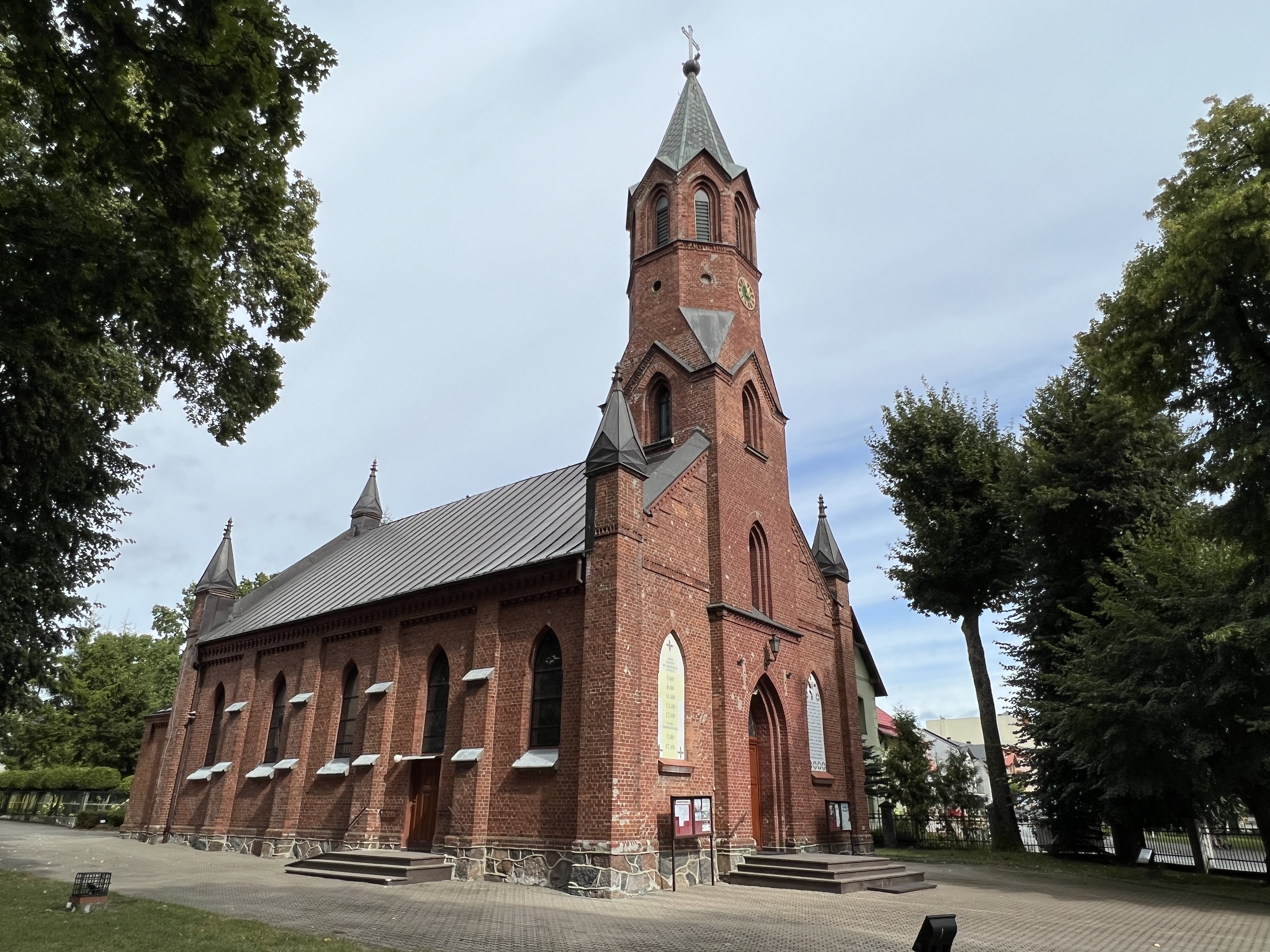
Saint Leon church

From 1709 to 1711 eastern Prussia suffered from a plague. The deceased were replaced by Germans from Brandenburg, Pomerania, Magdeburg, Halberstadt, the Electorate of the Palatinate, and Nassau, as well as Swiss and Lithuanians. In 1734, 117 Protestants expelled from Salzburg settled in the town. In the 19th century Gołdap's population consisted mainly of Poles, Lithuanians and Germans, mostly Protestants. Lutheran services took place in all three languages. In 1831, the Polish pastor's house was burnt down.

In 1807, Polish troops of General Jan Henryk Dąbrowski were stationed in the town. Part of the French Grande Armée passed through the town in 1812. In 1863, Poles smuggled weapons through the town to the Russian Partition of Poland to support the January Uprising.

In the 18th and 19th centuries Goldap was a notable centre of commerce and production of various goods for the local market, as well as an important centre of grain production. In 1818 it became a seat of Landkreis Goldap. In 1825, the county (including the town) had 24,911 inhabitants, including (by mother tongue): 17,412 (~70%) German, 3,940 (~16%) Polish and 3,559 (~14%) Lithuanian. In 1879 the town was linked to a railway.

=== World War I and II ===
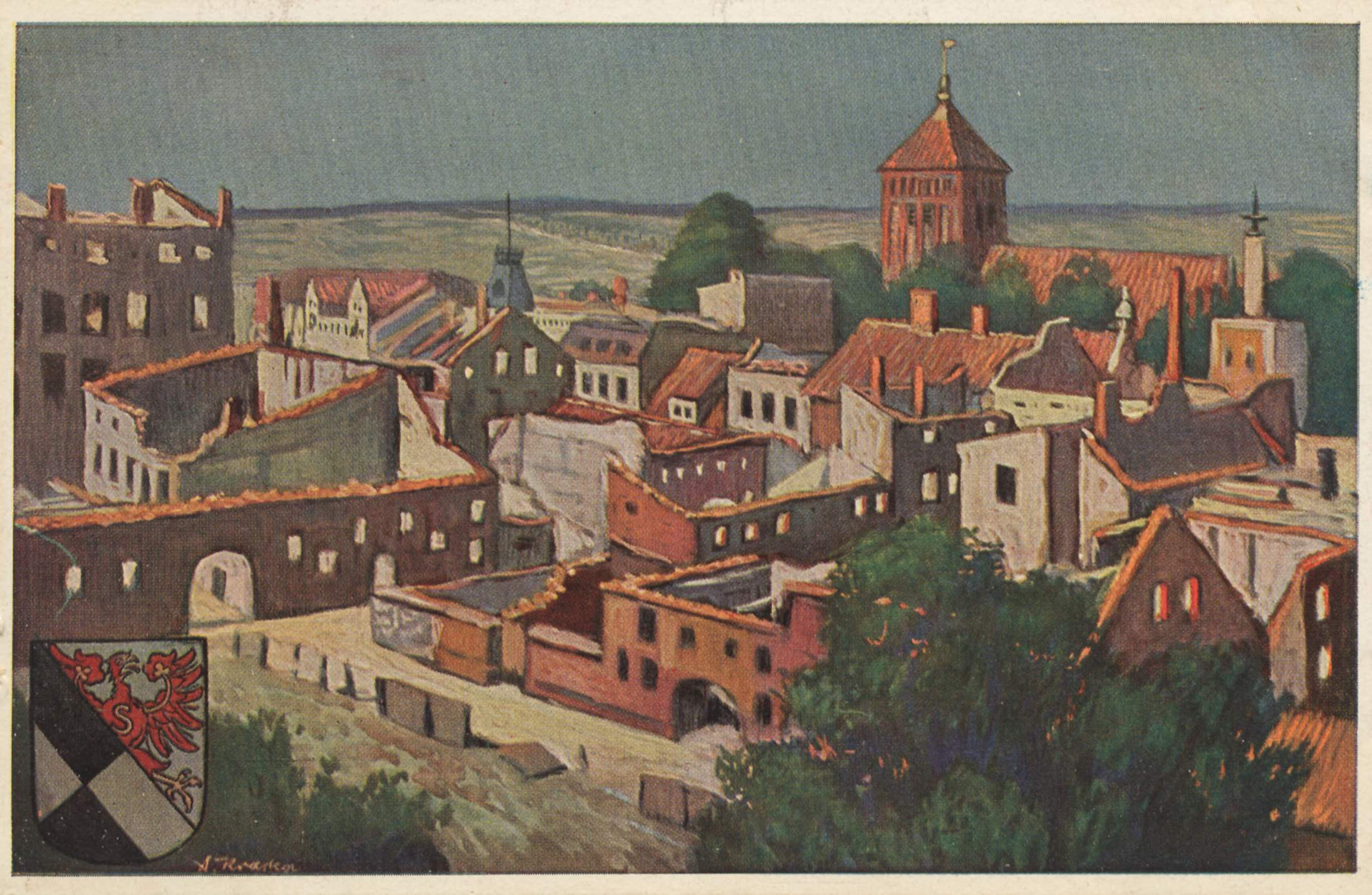
World War I destructions of Gołdap

During World War I Goldap was a scene of fierce fighting on the Eastern Front, which passed through the town twice. As a result, 91 residential houses and 92 industrial buildings were destroyed. It was occupied by the Russian army from the 18 August to 10 September 1914, and again from 5 November 1914 to 11 February 1915. The town was rebuilt, and soon after the war ended it reached a similar number of inhabitants it had had before.

During World War II Goldap was planned by the German staff as one of the strongholds guarding the rest of East Prussia from the Red Army on the Eastern Front. As a result of heavy fighting for the city and the regions directly east of it, in August and September 1944, 90% of the town was yet again destroyed. According to German war-time reports, about 50 civilians were murdered (some raped) by the Red Army on its initial entry into Goldap in October 1944. It was the first town of Nazi Germany to fall. However, in November 1944 the Wehrmacht reconquered Goldap and would be able to keep it until the end of December of the same year. In January, the German positions in far-eastern East Prussia collapsed completely.

=== Post-war Poland ===
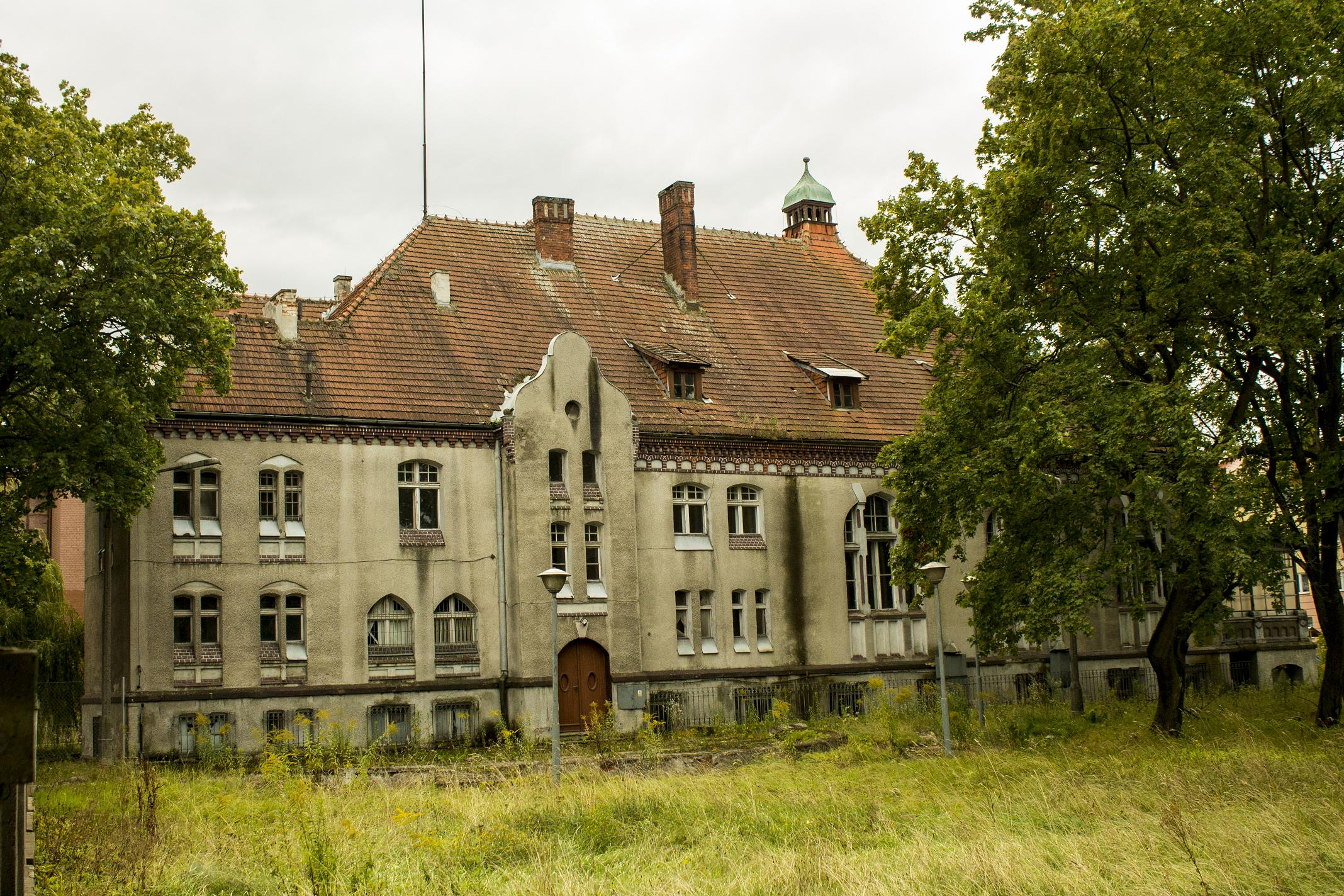
Former Officers' Mess

After the war, the town became again part of Poland under the terms of the Potsdam Conference. The transfer was confirmed by the German–Polish Border Treaty. The town was renamed to its historic Polish name Gołdap and rebuilt. The town retained its status as a seat of a powiat until 1975, when all powiats were abolished. After their re-establishment in 1999, Gołdap was not restored as a county seat, being instead assigned in the years 1999-2001 to the Olecko-Gołdap County. The town has subsequently reclaimed the original status, following re-establishment of a standalone Gołdap County.

Today the town of Gołdap remains an important centre of local trade and commerce. There are several small food production facilities (milk plant, industrial slaughterhouse, mill) located there, as well as a paper mill and a small tourist equipment works. In addition, it is one of the centres of tourism, with many skiing, swimming, sailing and leisure centres located both in the town and around it.

== Transport ==
National road 65 bypasses Gołdap.

== Sports ==
The Piękna Góra ski resort is located on the outskirts of Gołdap.

The local football club is Rominta Gołdap. It competes in the lower leagues.

== Notable residents ==
- Johann Friedrich Hartknoch (1740-1789), Enlightenment book publisher
- Johannes Thiele (1860–1935), German zoologist
- Erich Sack (1887–1943), Protestant Pastor and resistance fighter
- Alfred Partikel (1888–1945?), Painter
- Gotthard Fischer (1891–1969), general
- Sylwester Czereszewski (born 1971) a Polish footballer

== International relations ==
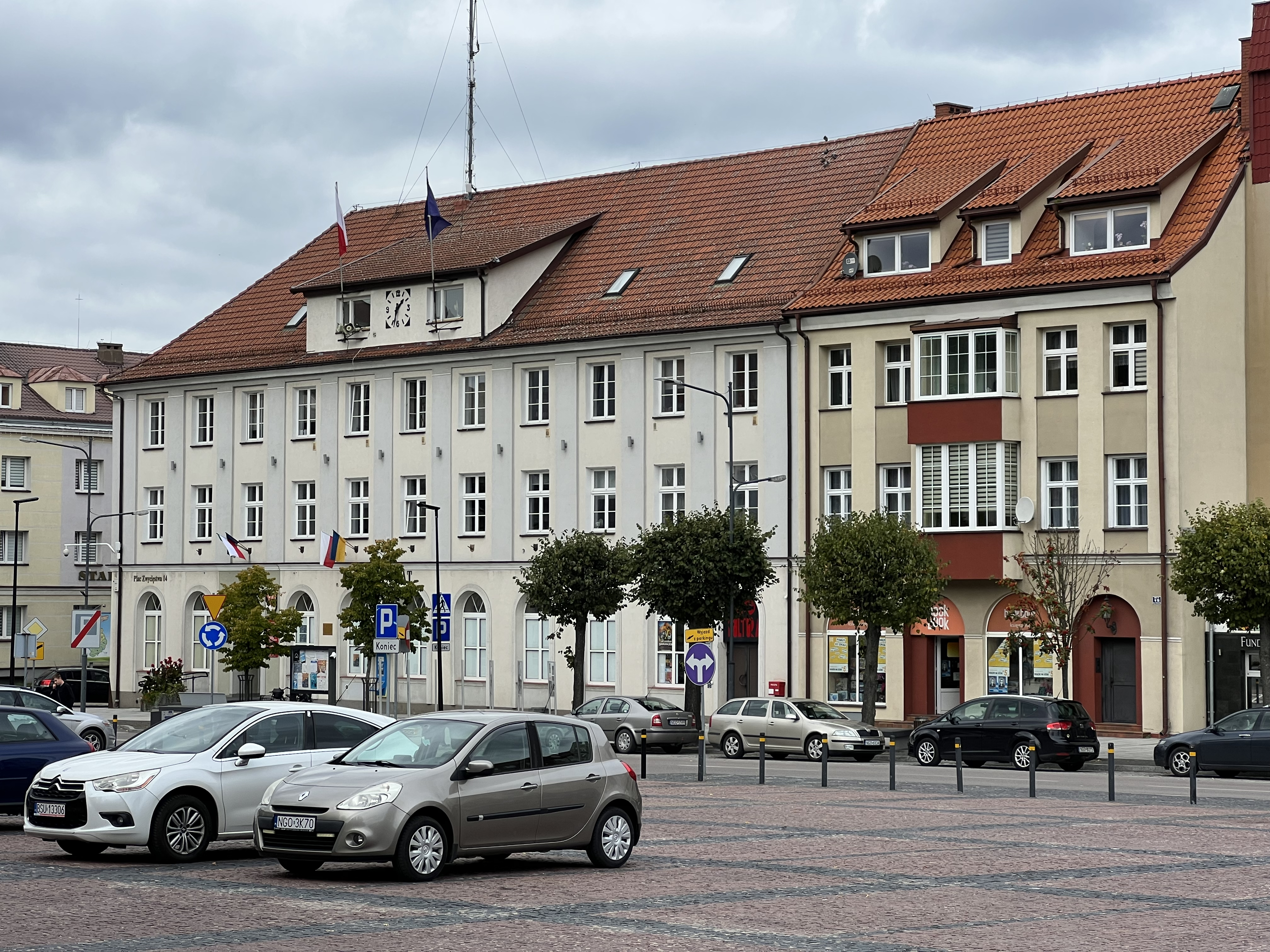
Town hall

Gołdap is a member of Cittaslow.

=== Twin towns – sister cities ===
Gołdap is twinned with:

- Ano Syros, Greece since 2000
- Giv'at Shmuel, Israel
- Stade, Germany
- Šakiai, Lithuania

Former twin towns:

- Gusev, Russia

In March 2022, Gołdap ended its partnership with the Russian city of Gusev as a response to the 2022 Russian invasion of Ukraine.
