= Onuškis =

- Town
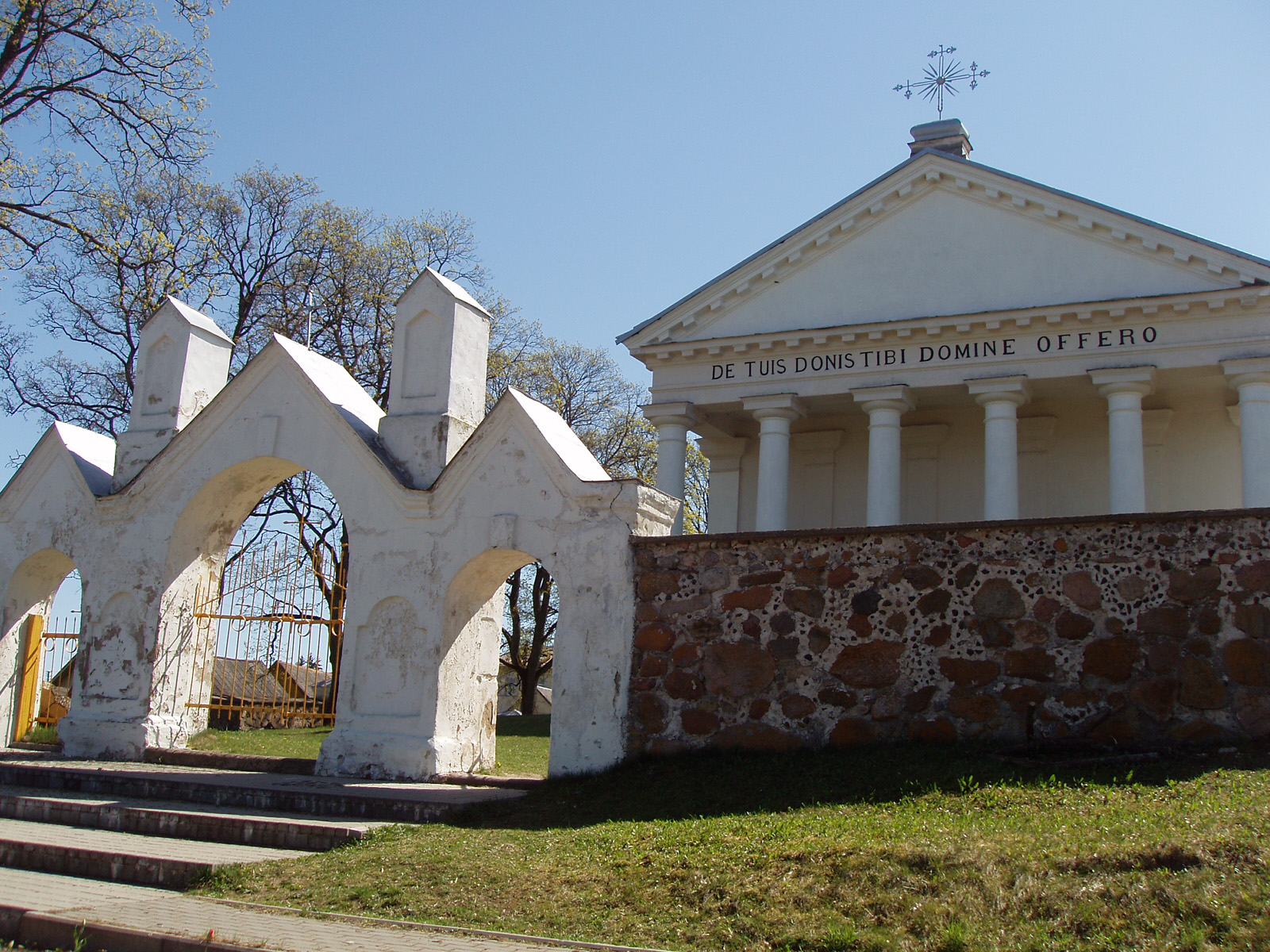

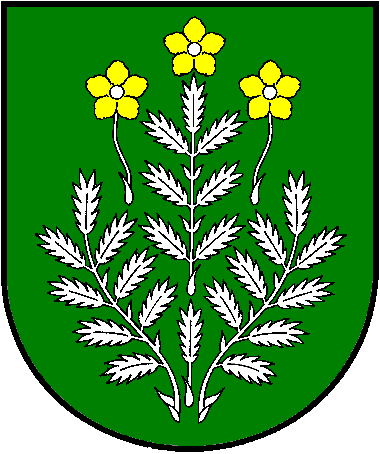
- Coat of arms

- Location of Onuškis
- Coordinates: 54°29′10″N 24°35′30″E
- Country: Lithuania
- Ethnographic region: Dzūkija
- County: Vilnius County
- Municipality: Trakai district municipality
- Eldership: Onuškis eldership
- Capital of: Onuškis eldership

Population (2011)
  - Total: 519
- Time zone: UTC+2 (EET)
  - Summer (DST): UTC+3 (EEST)

Onuškis is a small town in Lithuania in the Trakai district municipality, around 30 km (19 mi) from Trakai and 16 km (9.9 mi) south of Aukštadvaris. As of 2011, it had 519 inhabitants and was the seat for the Onuškis eldership.

== History ==
In the nineteenth century the Jews were the majority in the town. Before World War I about 80 to 90 Jewish families lived in there, but during the war years their number decreased to about 50 to 60 families. On September 30, 1941, 1,446 Jews from Aukštadvaris, Lentavris, Onuškis, Rudziszki, Troki, Žydkaimis, and the surrounding areas were shot, after being abused, in the Varninkai Forest by Lithuanians from Aukštadvaris, Onuškis, and Lentvaris

== See also ==
- Onuškis Manor
