= List of former towns of Poland =

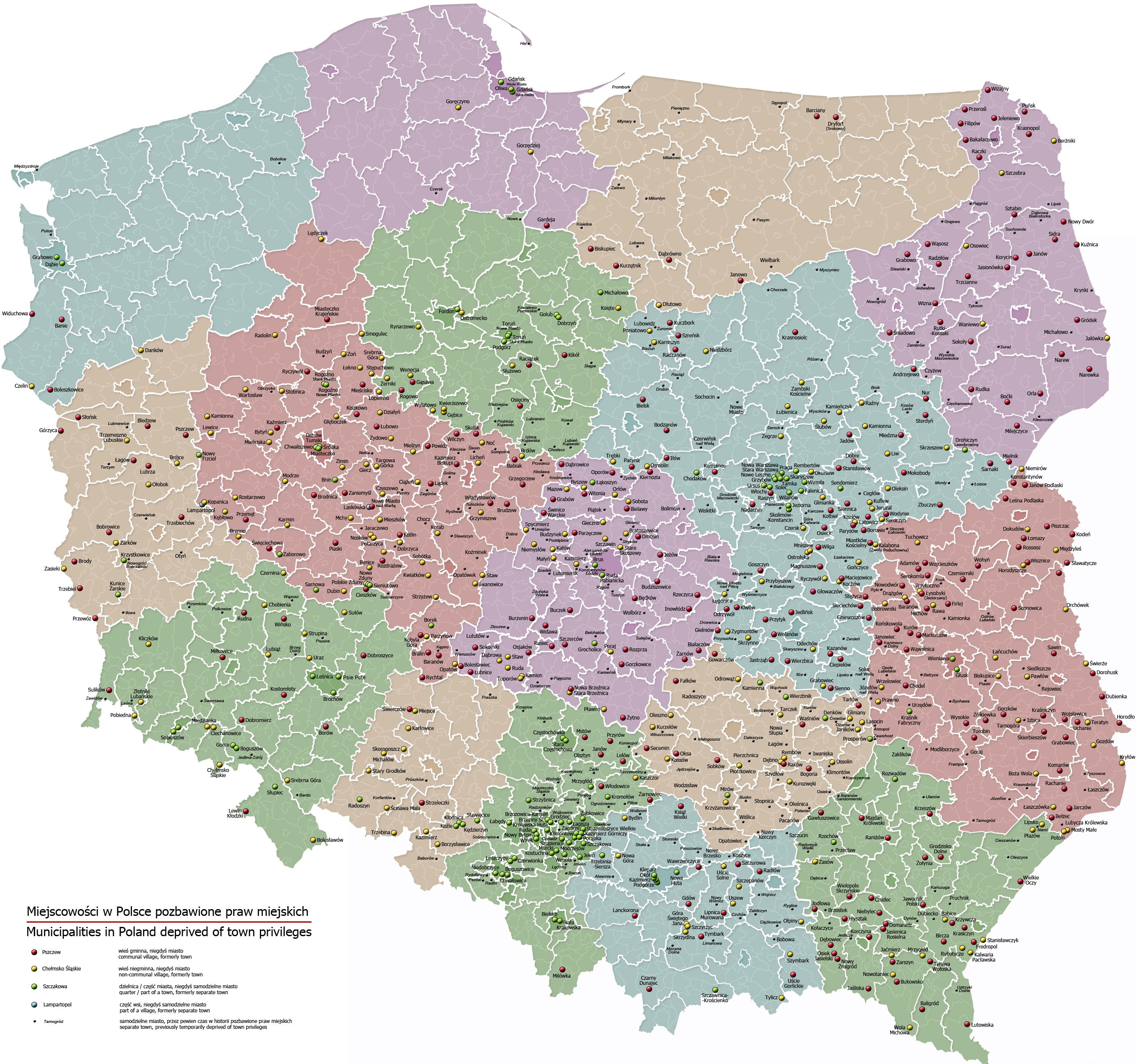
Map of places in Poland that lost their city status

The following is a list of towns of Poland which lost their town status.

- 21st century
- 20th century: 1985– 1977 – 1975 – 1973 – 1972 – 1959 – 1957 – 1956 – 1954 – 1950 – 1948 – 1946 – 1945 – 1939 – 1934 – 1932 – 1928 – 1921 – 1919 – 1915 – 1914
- 19th century: 1897 – 1896 – 1895 – 1892 – 1888 – 1880 – 1876 – 1875 – 1874 – 1873 – 1870 – 1869 – 1852 – 1824 – 1820 – 1818
- Before 19th century

== 21st century ==
=== 2002 ===
- Wesoła 1969; part of Warsaw now

== 20th century ==
=== 1977 ===
- Ursus 1952; part of Warsaw now
- Ząbkowice 1962; part of Dąbrowa Górnicza now

=== 1975 ===
- Boguszowice 1962, part of Rybnik now
- Brzeziny Śląskie 1951; part of Piekary Śląskie now
- Fordon part of Bydgoszcz now
- Grodziec 1951; part of Będzin now
- Kazimierz Górniczy 1967; part of Sosnowiec now
- Klimontów 1967; part of Sosnowiec now
- Kostuchna 1967; part of Katowice now
- Kraśnik Fabryczny 1954; part of Kraśnik now
- Murcki 1967; part of Katowice now
- Niedobczyce 1945; part of Rybnik now
- Strzemieszyce Wielkie 1945; part of Dąbrowa Górnicza now
- Wesoła 1962; part of Mysłowice now
- Zagórze 1967; part of Sosnowiec now

=== 1973 ===
- Brzozowice-Kamień 1962; in 1973 incorporated into Brzeziny Śląskie, since 1975 part of Piekary Śląskie
- Łagisza 1967; currently a borough of Będzina, śląskie)
- Porąbka 1967; part of Sosnowiec now
- Rozwadów 1693; part of Stalowa Wola now
- Węgierska Górka 1958

=== 1972 ===
- Boleszkowice (1331?)

=== 1959 ===
- Szopienice (1947; currently a borough of Katowice)

=== 1957 ===
- Rembertów (1939; currently a borough of Warsaw)

=== 1956 ===
- Szczakowa (1933; currently a borough of Jaworzno)

=== 1954 ===
- Łabędy (1954; currently a borough of Gliwice)

=== 1948 ===
- Dąbie (1249; now part of Szczecin)

=== 1947 ===
- Brójce (1428)

=== 1946 ===
- Biskupiec (1331)
- Bukowsko (18th century)
- Dąbrówno (1326)
- Nowotaniec (1444)
- Ruda Pabianicka (1923; part of Łódź now)

=== 1945 ===
- Banie 1230
- Barciany (1628)
- Bledzew 1458
- Bobrowice 1809
- Brzostek 1394
- Chełmsko Śląskie 1289
- Dobromierz before 1289
- Domaradz 15th century
- Dubienka 1588
- Gardeja 1334
- Jaśliska 1366
- Kalwaria Pacławska (17th century)
- Krasiczyn (17th century)
- Krzywcza (1398)
- Lubrza (1319)
- Srokowo (1405)
- Tyrawa Wołoska (18th century)
- Uście Gorlickie (1512)
- Widuchowa (prior to 1283)

=== 1934 ===
- Babice (1484)
- Bnin (1395; currently a borough of Kórnik)
- Jaśliska (1366)
- Lanckorona (1361)
- Lutowiska (1764 (1742?))
- Lipnica Murowana (1326)
- Milówka (1872)
- Narew (1514)
- Nowy Dwór (1578)
- Piaski (1775)
- Tymbark (1353)

=== 1932 ===
- Krościenko 1348
- Łagów (1808)

=== 1928 ===
- Dobroszyce (1663)

=== 1926 ===
- Oliwa (1874; currently a borough of Gdańsk)

=== 1921 ===
- Kuźnica Białostocka (1546)

=== 1919 ===
- Baligród (1634)
- Czudec (1427)
- Dębowiec (1349)
- Jaćmierz (15th century)
- Jasienica Rosielna (1727)
- Korczyna (15th century)
- Lutowiska (17th century)
- Mrzygłód (1431)
- Niebylec (15th century)
- Nowy Żmigród (1373)
- Ołpiny (19th century)
- Osiek Jasielski (1365)
- Wielopole Skrzyńskie (14th century)
- Zarszyn (1395)

=== 1915 ===
- Frysztak (1366)

=== 1914 ===
- Tylicz (1612)

== 19th century ==
=== 1897 ===
- Gródek (1558)
- Korycin (1671)

=== 1895 ===
- Berżniki (prior to 1559)
- Dubin (1284)

=== 1892 ===
- Bolesławów (1581)

=== 1888 ===
- Łekno (1370)
- Łopienno (early 16th century)

=== 1875 ===
- Bralin (prior to 1540)

=== 1874 ===
- Kamionna (prior to 1402, again in 1638)

=== 1873 ===
- Kwieciszewo (1342)

=== 1870 ===
- Adamów (1539)
- Andrzejewo (1528)
- Babiak (1816)
- Bakałarzewo (before 1589)
- Będków 1453
- Bielawy 1403
- Biskupice 1450
- Brdów 1436
- Brudzew (1458)
- Burzenin (1378)
- Czersk before 1350
- Filipów (1570)
- Firlej 1557
- Goszczyn 1386
- Grabowiec (prior to 1418)
- Horodło 1432
- Iłów 1506
- Janowiec 1537
- Kamieńczyk before 1428
- Kazimierz Biskupi 1287
- Kodeń 1511
- Kołbiel 1532
- Komarów-Osada 1748
- Krasnosielc (1824)
- Liw before 1421
- Łysobyki (1533–1564 as Przetoczno; in 1965 name has been changed again, this time to Jeziorzany)
- Łomazy before 1566
- Nur
- Osmolin
- Radziłów (1466)
- Wizna

=== 1869 ===
- Baranów (1544)
- Bielsk (1373)
- Bobrowniki (1485)
- Gliniany
- Gniewoszów (1693)
- Gorzków (1688)
- Grabowiec (1601)
- Janowo (1421)
- Kuczbork (1384)
- Mokobody (1496)
- Radzanów (1400)
- Stężyca (1330)
- Szreńsk (1383)
- Żółkiewka (1702)

=== 1801 ===
- Trzcianne

=== 1800 ===
- Jeleniewo

== Before 19th century ==
- Bratoszewice 1661
- Brodnica (before 1510)
- Budziszewice (before 1407)
- Bydlin 1530
- Bystrzyca (after 1582)
- Byszewo (c. 1300)
- Bytnica (before 1627)
- Milin (1314)
- Rybotycze 15th century
- Jodłowa 1359
- Miastków Kościelny (1472)
- Grabowo
- Niedzbórz
- Waniewo

== Bibliography ==
- Krzysztofik, Robert (2007). Lokacje miejskie na obszarze Polski. Dokumentacja geograficzno-historyczna (in Polish). Katowice: Wydawnictwo Uniwersytetu Śląskiego. ISBN 978-83-226-1616-1.
