= Zamishantsi =

Ukrainian ethnographic group

Zamishantsi Замішанці

Regions with significant populations
- Historically: Subcarpathian Voivodeship, Poland (north of Krosno); Currently: Ivano-Frankivsk Oblast and Lviv Oblast, Ukraine

Languages
- Ukrainian (Transitional Lemko–Boyko–Dniestrian dialectal features with Polish lexical influence)

Religion
- Ukrainian Greek Catholic Church (historically)

The Zamishantsi (Ukrainian: замішанці; Polish: Zamieszańcy) are a distinct ethnographic group of Ukrainians who historically inhabited a compact linguistic and cultural enclave surrounded by Polish-speaking settlements in the Subcarpathian Voivodeship of south-eastern Poland, north of Krosno and Jasło.

== Etymology and origins ==
The ethnonym Zamishantsi derives from the Ukrainian verb замішати (zamishaty, meaning "to mix" or "to intermingle"). It was originally an exonym used by neighboring Polish populations and Lemkos to describe a community living "intermixed" among Polish villages, detached from the main contiguous Ukrainian ethnic territory to the east and south.

According to historical and ethnographic research, the ancestors of the Zamishantsi settled in the forested hills between the Wisłok and Wisłoka rivers between the 14th and 16th centuries. Some scholars connect their origins to the eastward migration of Ruthenians during the Kingdom of Poland's colonization of the Subcarpathian foothills, as well as the resettlement of prisoners of war or settlers from Podolia and Red Ruthenia brought by local noble families (such as the Kamieniecki and Boner families) to clear forests and establish agricultural settlements.

== Geographic distribution ==
Prior to World War II, the Zamishantsi enclave consisted of ten predominantly Ukrainian-speaking Greek Catholic villages located in the Strzyżów and Krosno districts (between the towns of Strzyżów, Krosno, and Jasło):

- Bonarówka
- Czarnorzeki
- Gwoździanka
- Krasna
- Oparówka
- Pietrusza Wola
- Rzepnik
- Węglówka
- Wólka Bratkowska
- Wysoka Strzyżowska

In 1939, the total population of this enclave was estimated at 7,500–8,000 people.

== Culture and language ==
Although occasionally grouped with the Lemkos in broader administrative classifications due to their geographic proximity, ethnographers—including Roman Reinfuss, Volodymyr Kubijovyč, and Paul Robert Magocsi—classify the Zamishantsi as a distinct ethnographic subgroup.

- Language: Their vernacular belonged to the south-western dialect group of the Ukrainian language. While sharing archaic phonetic features with the Lemko dialect, it lacked the fixed penultimate stress characteristic of Lemko, instead retaining the mobile stress typical of Dniestrian and Boyko dialects, alongside numerous lexical borrowings from Polish due to centuries of surrounding Polish settlement.
- Religion and Identity: Nearly all Zamishantsi belonged to the Ukrainian Greek Catholic Church (organized within the Krosno deanery of the Przemyśl Eparchy). During the late 19th and early 20th centuries, local Greek Catholic priests and cultural societies (such as Prosvita reading rooms established in Bonarówka, Krasna, and Węglówka) fostered a strong modern Ukrainian national consciousness.
- Material Culture: Traditional Zamishantsi architecture featured wooden log cottages with thatched roofs, often whitewashed or painted with blue-tinted lime around the windows. Traditional attire combined elements of Subcarpathian dress with distinctive embroidery styles, and the local economy relied on subsistence agriculture, weaving, and seasonal labor.

== Post-World War II deportations ==
Following World War II and the establishment of the Polish–Soviet border agreement of August 1945, the Zamishantsi enclave remained on the Polish side of the border. Under the population exchange between Poland and Soviet Ukraine (1944–1946), the overwhelming majority of the Zamishantsi were resettled to the Ukrainian Soviet Socialist Republic in 1945–1946.

Most deported families were settled in western Ukraine, particularly in Ivano-Frankivsk Oblast (in and around Sniatyn, Kalush, and Rohatyn)—often occupying homes vacated by deported Galician Germans (such as in the former colony of Augustdorf near Sniatyn)—as well as in Lviv Oblast and Ternopil Oblast. A small number of remaining families who had initially avoided deportation were forcibly displaced to northern and western Poland during Operation Vistula in 1947.

Following the deportations, the former Greek Catholic wooden churches in the enclave (such as in Bonarówka, Krasna, Oparówka, and Węglówka) were closed or converted into Roman Catholic churches.

== In culture ==
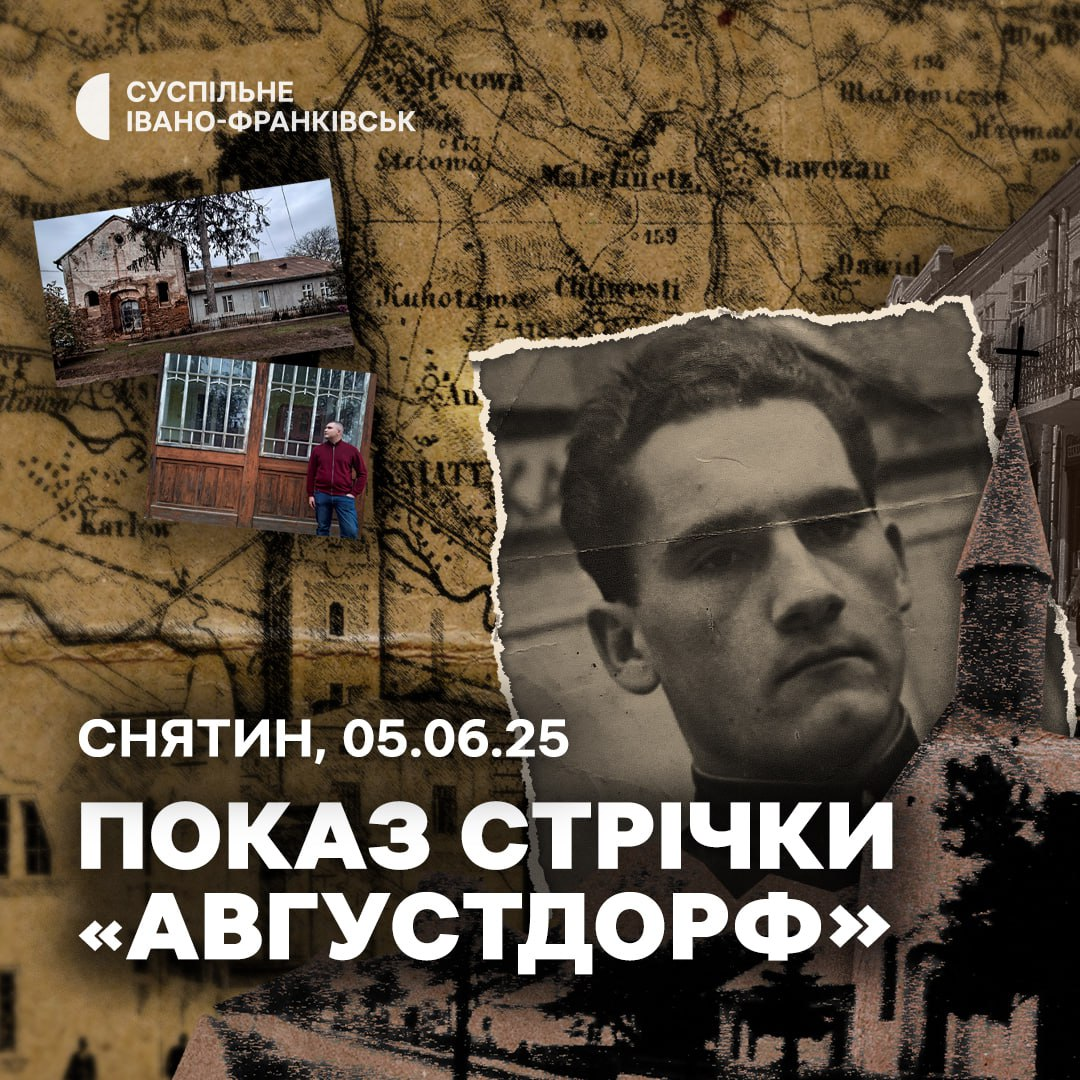
Announcement of the presentation of the film about Augustdorf in Sniatyn, 2025.

=== In media ===
In 2024, Suspilne Ivano-Frankivsk published a text article and documentary report titled Hunger, Extermination Battalions, the UPA, and Repressions: Stories from Stanislavivka, Where Families Deported from Zakerzonia Live, focusing on Zamishantsi deported from the village of Bonarówka through the accounts of their descendants—tractor driver Ihor Lysko, train driver Andrii Bednarchyk, and historian Andrii Boida, a direct descendant of Bonarówka's village head Antin Stanchak.

In January 2025, Suspilne Ivano-Frankivsk released the documentary film Augustdorf: From One of the Largest German Colonies of Galicia to a Deserted Street on its YouTube channel, featuring an interview with ethnic Zamishanyn, artist, and furniture designer Ivan Khomiak, as well as historical commentary by Andrii Boida on the settlement of the former German colony of Augustdorf in Sniatyn by Zamishantsi from Bonarówka.

Researcher Danyil Khomutetskyi notes that the film's subject coincided in 2024 with two anniversaries in Galician history: the 85th anniversary of the deportation of Galician Germans and the 80th anniversary of the start of the mass deportation of Ukrainians from Zakerzonia. He traces the demographic shifts in Augustdorf—where following the deportation of Germans in 1939 and Poles in 1944, displaced Ukrainians from Lemkivshchyna, the Jarosław region, and Zamishanshchyna settled between 1945 and 1947—and highlights the project, co-created by historian Andrii Boida (a descendant of Bonarówka deportees) and journalist Stepan Penkaliuk, as an effective approach to popularizing local history on social networks.

=== Music group ===
In the 2020s, the ethnoculture and musical traditions of the Zamishantsi have been represented by the folk ensemble "Zamišanci", based in Krosno. Formed from informal creative gatherings in the hamlet of Wólka Bratkowska before moving rehearsals to the Regional Borderland Culture Center in Krosno, the five-member group reinterprets Rusyn cultural heritage by combining traditional music with theatrical performance. Taking its name from the Zamishantsi ethnographic group historically inhabiting the borderland between Lemkivshchyna and Boykivshchyna, the musicians describe themselves as "modern Zamishantsi" inspired by the landscape of the Low Beskids.

=== Memorials ===
In 2022, a memorial plaque honoring the Zamishantsi deported from the village of Bonarówka was installed in the village of Stanislavivka in Kolomyia Raion, Ivano-Frankivsk Oblast.

== Notable people ==
- Antin Stanchak (1872–1964) — military officer, oberleutnant in the Austro-Hungarian Army (1918), and village headman (*viit*) of Bonarowka.
- Nazar Stanchak (1926–2002) — Ukrainian industrialist and longtime director of the flour mill in Mykulyntsi (now part of Sniatyn).

== See also ==
- Ethnic groups in Ukraine
- Ukrainians in Poland
- Lemkos
- Dolyniany

== Sources ==
- Bata, Artur; Łuczaj, Michał (2014). Zamieszańcy: losy Rusinów na Pogórzu (in Polish). Krosno: Krośnieńska Oficyna Wydawnicza. ISBN 978-83-62843-50-3.
- Boida, Andrii (2019). "Pereselennia zhyteliv sela Bonarivka na tereny Ukrainskoi RSR (v konteksti pereselenskykh rukhiv seredyny 1940-kh rr. i operatsii "Visla" 1947 r.)". Kraieznavets Prykarpattia (in Ukrainian) (34): 13–15.
- Boida, Andrii (2019). "Zakhidnoukrainski zemli v stalinskii deportatsiinii politytsi". Sotsialno-humanitarni doslidzhennia ta innovatsiina osvitnia diialnist (in Ukrainian). Dnipro: SPD Okhotnik. pp. 136–138.
- Dobrianska-Popovych, Halyna; Dobrianskyi, Oleksandr (2015). Oparivka, Enerhetyka pradidivskoi zemli. Iz tsyklu "Zamishantsi" (in Ukrainian). Lviv: Kolo.
- Holei, Mykola (2015). Bonarivka... spohad z dytynstva (in Ukrainian). Sniatyn: Muzychno-vydavnychyi dim "V. Lazarenko".
- Holei, Mykola; Holodynskyi, Andrii (2008). Vtrachena zemlia (in Ukrainian). Sniatyn: Prut Prynt.
- Holei, Mykola (2021). Z nashykh. Dokumentalnyi narys (in Ukrainian). Kolomyia: Vik.
- Huk, Bohdan (2013). "U ruskomu "shtetli" mizh Korosnom ta Riashevom". Nashe Slovo (in Ukrainian). No. 52. p. 13.
- Khomutetskyi, Danyil (2025). "Dokumentalnyi film "Avhustdorf": perevahy ta nedoliky proiektu". XV Bukovynska mizhnarodna istoryko-kraieznavcha konferentsiia (in Ukrainian). Chernivtsi: Tekhnodruk. pp. 385–387.
- Kolesnik, L. (2023). "Ukrainski zamishantsi: istoriia deportatsii u spohadakh dialektonosiiv". Ad fontes. Dzherela dialektolohichnykh studii (in Ukrainian). 1 (14). Warsaw; Lviv: 142–156.
- Lesiv, Mykhailo (1997). Ukrainski hovirky v Polshchi (in Ukrainian). Warsaw: Ukrainskyi arkhiv.
- Olszański, Henryk (2007). Zamieszańcy. Studium etnograficzne (in Polish). Sanok: Muzeum Budownictwa Ludowego.
- Pashchak, Petro (2021). Spomyny z zhyttia moieho (in Ukrainian). Kolomyia: Vik.
- Pashchak, Yaroslav (2001). Rodynyi krai, selo rodyme (in Ukrainian). Kyiv: Veselka.
- Struminskyi, Bohdan, ed. (1988). Lemkivshchyna. Zemlia – liudy – istoriia – kultura. Ch. 1. Zapysky Naukovoho tovarystva im. Shevchenka (in Ukrainian). Vol. 206.
- Verkhratskyi, Ivan (1894). "Hovir Zamishantsiv". Zapysky NTSh (in Ukrainian) (3): 153–156.
