= Antin Stanchak =

Austro-Hungarian military officer and village head

- Anton Stanczak; Антін Іванович Станчак
- Antin Stanchak in 1933
- Born: 28 January 1872; Bonarówka, Kingdom of Galicia and Lodomeria, Austria-Hungary
- Died: 19 February 1964 (aged 92); Horishnie Zaluchchia, Ukrainian SSR, Soviet Union
- Military career
- Allegiance: Austria-Hungary
- Branch: Common Army
- Rank: Oberleutnant
- Commands: Chief of Provisions, 15th Infantry Regiment (1916–1918)
- Conflicts: World War I; Battle of Galicia; Siege of Przemyśl; Italian front
- Awards: Bronze Military Merit Medal

Antin Ivanovych Stanchak (Ukrainian: Антін Іванович Станчак; German: Anton Stanczak; 28 January 1872 – 19 February 1964) was a Ukrainian military officer in the Austro-Hungarian Army who held the rank of Oberleutnant and served in military logistics during World War I. In the interwar period, he served as the wójt (village head) of Bonarówka.

== Biography ==
=== Early life ===
Stanchak was born on 28 January 1872 to a Ukrainian peasant family in the village of Bonarówka (Strzyżów County) in the Kingdom of Galicia and Lodomeria, Austria-Hungary, part of the ethnographic region of Zamishantsi. In the 1890s, he emigrated to the United States, where he worked in the port of Chicago and in coal mines in Pennsylvania. Upon returning to Galicia, he acquired agricultural land and forest plots and engaged in farming.

=== Military service ===
After completing mandatory conscription, Stanchak remained in the Austro-Hungarian Army on extended service. In the early 1910s, he served in the 45th Infantry Regiment, achieving the rank of Feldwebel. As of July 1913, he remained registered with the 45th Infantry Regiment (Sanok recruiting district) while detached to the 80th Infantry Regiment in Zolochiv.

By order of the Imperial and Royal Ministry of War published in the Verordnungsblatt, Stanchak—then a deputy provisions officer (Proviantoffiziers-Stellvertreter) in the 80th Infantry Regiment—was promoted to lieutenant of the provisions service (Leutnantproviantoffier) with seniority dating from 1 August 1914.

With the outbreak of World War I, Stanchak served on the Eastern Front with the 19th Landsturm Infantry Regiment, taking part in the Battle of Galicia (1914) and the Siege of Przemyśl (1914–1915). By personal decree of Emperor Franz Joseph I on 13 January 1915, he was awarded an official imperial commendation "in recognition of distinguished service before the enemy" (in Anerkennung vorzüglicher Dienstleistung vor dem Feinde) and received the Bronze Military Merit Medal (Militär-Verdienstmedaille).

In 1916, he was transferred to the 15th Infantry Regiment, where he headed the provisions supply section until the end of the war and served on the Italian front. On 1 May 1918, he was promoted to Oberleutnant of the provisions service.

=== Interwar period and later life ===
Following the collapse of Austria-Hungary and the incorporation of Galicia into the Second Polish Republic, Stanchak returned to civilian life in Bonarówka. In the early 1920s, after the death of village head Vasyl Kachmarskyi, Stanchak assumed the duties of acting wójt as deputy head and was subsequently elected permanent wójt of Bonarówka, overseeing local municipal administration.

In June 1945, during the post-World War II population transfers between Poland and the Ukrainian SSR, Stanchak and his multi-generational family—including his daughter-in-law Kseniia and grandsons Bohdan, Ivan, and Myron—were resettled from Bonarówka to the Stanislav Oblast in Soviet Ukraine, losing a residential estate and 9.2 hectares of land. He settled in the village of Horishnie Zaluchchia near Sniatyn, where he worked on a collective farm and lived until his death on 19 February 1964. His grandson was Ukrainian food industry specialist Nazar Stanchak. In September 2024, his tenure as wójt of Bonarówka was featured in a documentary report by Suspilne Ivano-Frankivsk on deported families from Zakerzonia.

== Awards ==
- Bronze Military Merit Medal (Militär-Verdienstmedaille, 1915)

== Sources ==
- Boyda, Andrii (2019). "Pereselennia zhyteliv sela Bonarivka na tereny Ukrainskoi RSR (v konteksti pereselenskykh rukhiv seredyny 1940-kh rr. i operatsii "Visla" 1947 r.)". Kraieznavets Prykarpattia (in Ukrainian) (34): 13–15.
- Goley, Mykola (2021). Z nashykh. Dokumentalnyi narys (in Ukrainian). Kolomyia: Vik. p. 232.
- "Militärische Rundschau". Militärische Rundschau (in German) (16): 4–5. 26 January 1915.
- "Militärzeitung". Die Zeit (in German) (513): 5. 1918.
- Pashchak, Yaroslav (2001). Rodymyi krai, selo rodyme (in Ukrainian). Kyiv: Veselka. p. 204.
- Ranglisten des kaiserlichen und königlichen Heeres 1917 (in German). Vienna: K. K. Hof- und Staatsdruckerei. 1917. p. 1292.
- "Verordnungsblatt für das k. u. k. Heer. Personalangelegenheiten". K. K. Kriegsministerium (in German) (37). Vienna: 356. 26 July 1913.
- "Verordnungsblatt für das k. u. k. Heer. Personalangelegenheiten". K. K. Kriegsministerium (in German). Vienna: 572. 1 August 1914.
