= Augustdorf (Sniatyn) =

Augustdorf Августдорф Augustdorf Августів (Polish: Augustów)
- Former settlement / Neighborhood
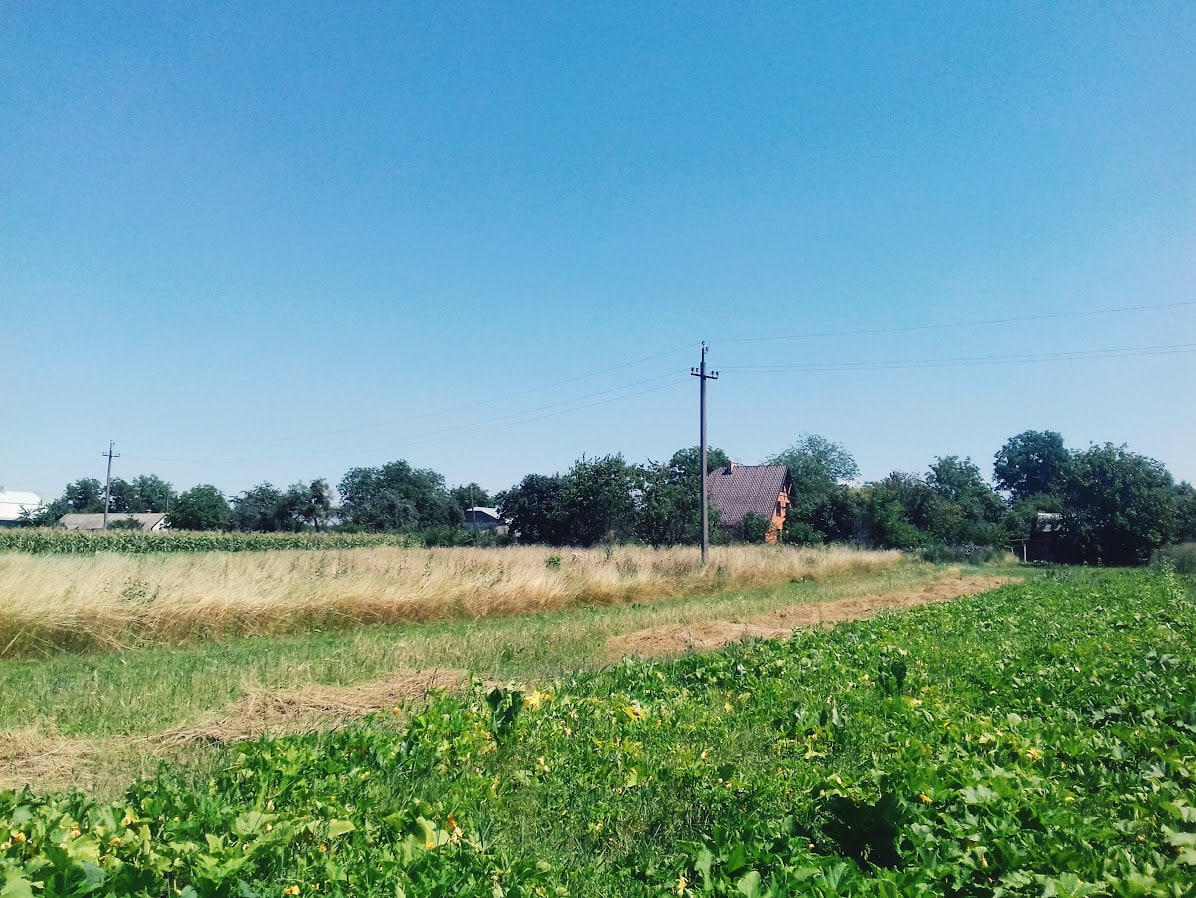
- View of House No. 39 in former Augustdorf, 2017

- Location within Ivano-Frankivsk Oblast Location within Ukraine
- Coordinates: 48°27′59″N 25°34′58″E
- Country: Ukraine
- Oblast: Ivano-Frankivsk Oblast
- Raion: Kolomyia Raion
- Hromada: Sniatyn urban hromada
- City: Sniatyn
- Founded: 7 November 1837
- Historical affiliation: Sniatyn District (until 1939); Sniatyn Raion (1940–2020)
- Elevation: 312 m (1,024 ft)

Population (1930)
  - Total: 300
- Postal code: 78300
- Area code: +380 3476

Augustdorf (Ukrainian: Августдорф; German: Augustdorf; Polish: Augustów) is a former German colony that existed from 1837 to 1940 on the northern outskirts of Sniatyn in present-day Ivano-Frankivsk Oblast, western Ukraine. Established during the German colonization of the Kingdom of Galicia and Lodomeria, it was considered one of the largest German settlements in eastern Galicia.

The settlement featured a regular H-shaped street layout typical of planned German colonial villages. Historically, it lay near the Turetskyi Potik stream, which formed part of the state border between Poland and Romania in the interwar period (1919–1939) and between the Soviet Union and Romania in 1939–1940. Following the Soviet annexation of western Ukraine in September 1939, almost the entire German population was resettled to Nazi Germany under the Heim ins Reich program in October 1939. Between 1945 and 1948, the vacated houses were populated by Ukrainians deported from Zakerzonia (primarily Zamishantsi from Bonarówka and Lemkos from Jawornik). In the 1950s, the former colony was fully integrated into the urban boundaries of Sniatyn as Hohol Street (Ukrainian: вулиця Гоголя).

== Geography ==
Augustdorf was situated approximately 3 km north-east of the center of Sniatyn in the historical region of Pokuttia, near the border with Bukovina, and roughly 100 km south-east of Ivano-Frankivsk. Located on an elevated hill overlooking the Prut valley and the distant Carpathian Mountains, the colony was bounded to the east by the Turetskyi Potik stream and the forest of Orshivtsi, to the west by Potichok, to the south by the Sniatyn suburb of Balky, and to the north by the agricultural lands of Stetseva.

== Etymology ==
Several hypotheses exist regarding the origin of the name Augustdorf:

- Most historians link it to Augustdorf, a municipality in North Rhine-Westphalia, Germany, from where a significant portion of the original settlers originated.
- Another version associates the name with Sniatyn's mayor August Teodorowicz, who lobbied for the allocation of municipal land to German colonists.
- Local folklore suggests the settlers arrived in August (German: August) following the harvest.

== History ==
=== Austrian Empire and Austria-Hungary ===
Following the Partitions of Poland and the incorporation of Galicia into the Habsburg monarchy, German colonists from the Palatinate, Bavaria, Baden, Nassau, and Württemberg began settling in the Sniatyn area between 1777 and 1787. In 1830, the mayor of Sniatyn issued an invitation to German communities across Galicia regarding the parceling of municipal fields north of the town. By 1836, ten German families had purchased and settled on these plots, leading to the formal establishment of the colony of Augustdorf on 7 November 1837. The early colonists came primarily from North Rhine-Westphalia, Bavaria, western Austria, and East Prussia.

In 1847, a major fire destroyed all homesteads and the wooden schoolhouse, claiming four lives. The colony was subsequently rebuilt and reinforced by new settlers from the Galician German colonies of Josefsberg and Kavsko, reaching around 30 families by 1867. By the early 20th century, the population reached approximately 300 inhabitants, of whom 90% were ethnic Germans (bearing surnames such as Kopp, Riekrich, Bach, Freyer, Löwenberg, Rippel, Pauer, Hauer, Frombach, Poppel, Bollembach, and Niebergall), with the remaining 10% comprising Poles, Ukrainians, and Jews.

Colonists drained the surrounding marshlands through land reclamation and engaged primarily in agriculture, alongside crafts such as carpentry, blacksmithing, shoemaking, and tailoring. Most homesteads consisted of two houses—one for the older generation and another for the younger family. A four-grade elementary school was built in 1863, and following another destructive fire in 1867, a brick Evangelical church and school building was erected in 1868 with support from the Gustav-Adolf-Werk. In 1892, Augustdorf farmers participated in Sniatyn's municipal sanitation program by purchasing composted waste to fertilize the colony's sandy soils. Another major fire in late 1912 destroyed over 60 homesteads.

=== World War I and Interwar Period ===
During World War I, dozens of men from Avhustdorf were mobilized into the Austro-Hungarian Army (including Lieutenant Wilhelm Hauer, who later served as an officer in the Ukrainian Galician Army). Because of its elevated position overlooking Sniatyn, the colony became a strategic battleground in October 1914 and May 1915 between Austro-Hungarian and Russian forces, resulting in artillery bombardments, evacuations, and Russian occupations in 1914–1915 and 1916–1917. On 19 April 1915, representatives of the Avhustdorf community welcomed Archduke Karl Franz Joseph during his visit to Sniatyn.

From November 1918 to May 1919, under the West Ukrainian People's Republic, a border detachment of the Ukrainian Galician Army was stationed in Avhustdorf to guard the nearby Romanian frontier. After the Polish–Ukrainian War, the settlement came under the Second Polish Republic (officially designated as Augustów within the urban municipality of Sniatyn). The community maintained German cultural and educational life through a branch of the Association of Christian Germans in Galicia, a reading society established in 1933–1934, and a local volleyball team. On 7 November 1937, the colony celebrated its centenary alongside the consecration of a newly built Evangelical church.

=== World War II and Post-War Resettlement ===
Following the Soviet invasion of Poland in September 1939, Sniatyn was occupied by the Red Army. In October 1939, in accordance with Soviet–German agreements, a resettlement commission relocated approximately 315 German residents (around 90% of the colony's population) to Germany and German-occupied territories; only elderly residents and Germans with Ukrainian or Polish spouses remained.

In 1940, Augustdorf was administratively attached to Sniatyn (functioning as a village within the Sniatyn City Council in 1944–1950 before being incorporated as Hohol Street in 1951–1952). In June 1945, 18 families of Zamishantsi deported from the village of Bonarówka (in Strzyżów County, Poland) under the population exchange between Poland and Soviet Ukraine were settled in the vacated houses of Avhustdorf, followed in 1946–1948 by Lemkos from Jawornik and Ukrainians from the Jarosław area. The local elementary school operated until around 1964–1965.

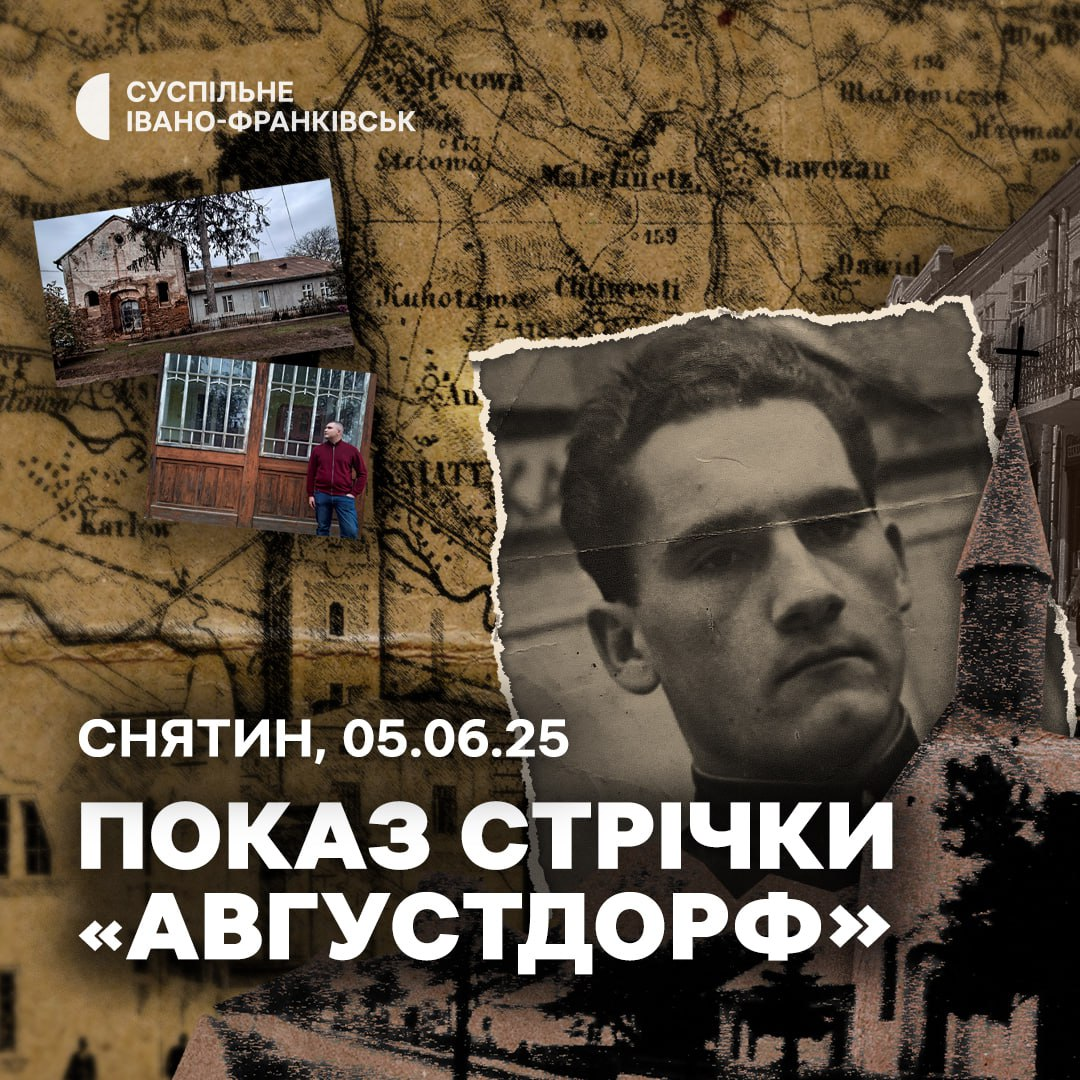
Announcement of the presentation of a film about Augustdorf in Sniatyn on 5 June 2025.

During the Russo-Ukrainian war, on 1 April 2026, two Russian Shahed-type attack drones fell within the historical area of Avhustdorf during a daytime strike on western Ukraine, damaging local outbuildings with debris.

== Landmarks and Legacy ==
- Evangelical Church (1868): Used as a club and later as a technical salt storage facility during the Soviet era, resulting in severe structural deterioration.
- Former Schoolhouse (1863): Preserved and converted into a private residential building.
- German Cemeteries: Two historical cemeteries partially survive; the older 1830s cemetery retains a single stone cross, while several dozen original German gravestones remain in the newer cemetery established after 1912.
- Cultural Tradition: After 1945, the resettled Ukrainian residents continued the colony's annual community festival—historically held on 7 November (the anniversary of Avhustdorf's founding)—by celebrating their parish feast day on 8 November (St. Demetrius Day according to the Julian calendar).
- Documentary Film: In January 2025, Suspilne Ivano-Frankivsk released the documentary film Augustdorf (initiated by historian Andrii Boida and directed by Stepan Penkaliuk), chronicling the history of the German colonists and the post-war Ukrainian deportees.

== Notable People ==
- Wilhelm Hauer (1895–?), lieutenant in the Austro-Hungarian Army and later an officer in the Ukrainian Galician Army, born in Avhustdorf.
- Yaroslav Lukavetskyi (1908–1993), Ukrainian painter of the Oleksa Novakivskyi school; his mother Jadwiga (née Hergestheimer) hailed from an Avhustdorf blacksmith family.
- Zynovii Butso (born 1939), Ukrainian energy engineer, public figure, and philanthropist, who lived in Avhustdorf from 1945 through the 1950s.
