= Nazar Stanchak =

Ukrainian industrial manager (1926–2002)

- Назар Юрійович Станчак
- Born: 20 October 1926; Bonarówka, Strzyżów County, Lwów Voivodeship, Second Polish Republic
- Died: 9 September 2002 (aged 75); Ivano-Frankivsk, Ivano-Frankivsk Oblast, Ukraine
- Resting place: Sniatyn City Cemetery
- Occupations: Industrial manager, miller
- Years active: 1945–1986
- Spouse: Dariia Vasylivna Vasylyk (1929–1981)
- Children: Iryna
- Awards: Medal "Veteran of Labour"

Nazar Yuriiovych Stanchak (Ukrainian: Назар Юрійович Станчак; 20 October 1926 – 9 September 2002) was a Ukrainian industrial manager and longtime director of a flour-milling enterprise in Sniatyn. He was a representative of the Zamishantsi ethnographic group.

== Biography ==
=== Early life ===
Stanchak was born on 20 October 1926 in the Ukrainian village of Bonarówka in Strzyżów County (now in Subcarpathian Voivodeship, Poland) into a family belonging to the local ethnographic group of Zamishantsi. His mother was Anastasiia Antonivna Padokh (née Stanchak; 1908–1984).

He was raised in the household of his maternal grandparents, Antin Stanchak (1872–1964) and Mariia Stanchak (née Soltysik; 1876–1944). In the late 1890s, his grandfather worked in the United States (at the port of Chicago) and in coal mines in Canada; upon returning, he purchased land and forest in Bonarówka, served as village wójt, and served in a salvage unit of the Austro-Hungarian Army during World War I.

Stanchak attended the local elementary school and planned to study architecture at Lviv Polytechnic, though his educational plans were interrupted by the outbreak of World War II. While attending the Bonarówka elementary school, he took private German lessons from local teacher Yuliia Oparivska (wife of Ukrainian Galician Army chaplain Vasyl Oparivskyi), who taught in Zamishantsi villages during the interwar period. The foundational German language skills he acquired proved useful during his forced labor in Austria and subsequent service in a Soviet quartermaster unit in 1945.

=== World War II ===
In the spring of 1941, during the German occupation, Stanchak was deported for forced agricultural labor in Nazi Germany, working as a hired laborer on a private farm in the village of Ladendorf (Mistelbach District, Lower Austria). While working in Ladendorf, he participated in fundraising for Ukrainian cultural and educational initiatives; in November 1941, he was listed among donors from the local workers' community who contributed to the National and Student Funds of the Ukrainian National Union in Berlin.

After Soviet forces occupied the area in April 1945, Stanchak was assigned to work in the quartermaster service of the 2nd Ukrainian Front, where he served as an interpreter and worked in a sausage-making facility owing to his proficiency in German. In late August 1945, he set out on foot for his homeland. Arriving in Bonarówka, he found the village depopulated as a result of the population exchange between Poland and Soviet Ukraine. Learning that his relatives had been resettled to the Ukrainian Soviet Socialist Republic, he crossed the Soviet–Polish border and reached Pokuttia in the autumn of 1945, locating his family in the village of Horishnie Zaluchchia near Sniatyn.

Following the 1945 deportations from Zakerzonia, Stanchak settled in Sniatyn on the territory of the former German colony of Avhustdorf (Mykola Hohol Street), which between 1945 and 1947 was populated by deported Zamishantsi families from Bonarówka and Lemkos. Unlike most resettled families who received vacated homesteads free of charge from the local council, Stanchak purchased his property directly from its previous German owner, blacksmith Philipp Kopp. The homestead consisted of a typical interwar wooden shingle-roofed house (No. 39) with four windows, two stoves, and an adjoining barn.

=== Career ===
Stanchak completed seven grades of secondary education at the Sniatyn evening school. From autumn 1945 to October 1947, he worked as a laborer and miller at water and mechanical mills in Horishnie Zaluchchia and Potichok. From 1947 to 1950, he performed compulsory military service in the Soviet Army, serving as a mountain-pack mortar gunner in the 796th Mountain Rifle Regiment of the 38th Army of the Carpathian Military District, stationed at Palanok Castle in Mukachevo; he was demobilized in September 1950 with the rank of private. From August to October 1955, he completed advanced training courses for milling industry workers in Odesa, qualifying as a specialist in grain and groat processing.

From 1953 until the spring of 1986, Stanchak served as director of the corn and flour mill in the suburban village of Mykulyntsi (incorporated into the city of Sniatyn in 1978), operating within the Ukrmukomol enterprise network. He led the facility for 33 years until his retirement. On 31 March 1986, by decision of the Executive Committee of the Ivano-Frankivsk Oblast Council of People's Deputies, he was awarded the Medal "Veteran of Labour" for his long-standing industrial service.

Stanchak died on 9 September 2002 in Ivano-Frankivsk and was buried at the Sniatyn City Cemetery alongside his wife.

== In film ==
- In the 2025 documentary film Avhustdorf, produced by Suspilne Ivano-Frankivsk about the history of the former German colony in Sniatyn, Stanchak is featured as the great-grandfather of the film's narrator and one of the Ukrainian deportees from Zakerzonia who resettled in the colony in 1945.
