= Mikołaj Kamieniecki =

Polish nobleman and first Great Hetman of the Crown

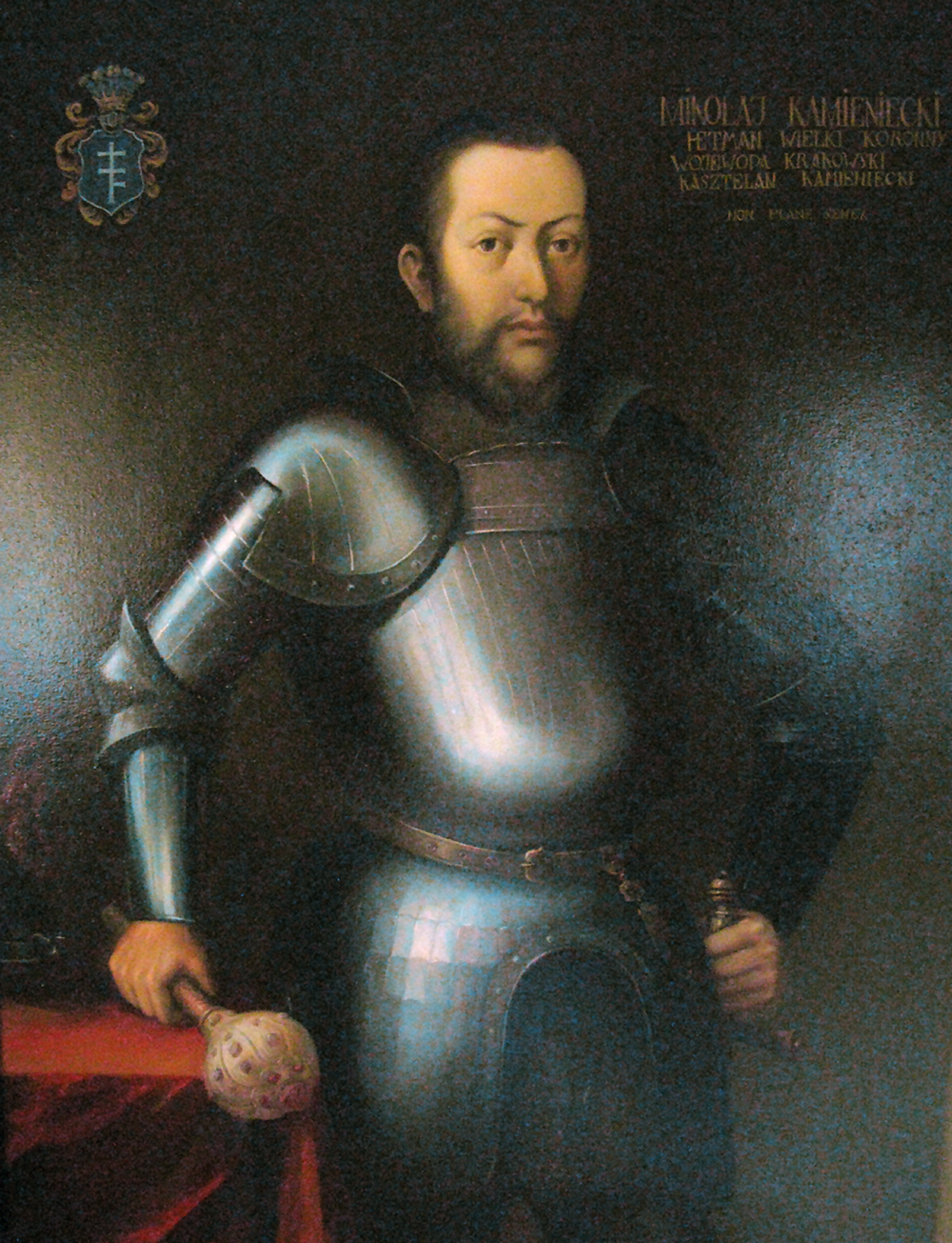
- Coat of arms: Pilawa
- Born: 1460; Odrzykoń, Poland
- Died: 15 April 1515 (aged 54–55); Kraków, Poland
- Noble family: Kamieniecki
- Father: Henryk Kamieniecki
- Mother: Katarzyna Pieniążkówna h. Jelita

Mikołaj Kamieniecki h. Pilawa (1460 – 15 April 1515) was a Polish nobleman (szlachcic) and the first Great Hetman of the Crown.

Mikołaj was the oldest son of castellan of Sanok Henryk Kamieniecki and Katarzyna Pieniążkówna. He was owner of Węglówka, Kombornia, Wola Komborska, Jabłonica, Malinówka and the Kamieniec (ger. Erenberg) castle in Odrzykoń. A trusted co-worker of King Jan I Olbracht and Kazimierz Jagiellończyk.

He became castellan of Sandomierz, voivode of the Kraków Voivodship and was Great Hetman of the Crown from 1503 until 1515.

Mikołaj defeated Vlachs in the Battle of Czerniowce during the Moldavian campaign in 1509 and Turks in 1512 in the Battle of Łopuszno.

== Marriage and issue ==
Mikołaj married Anna Tarnowska-Melsztyńska h. Leliwa in ca. 1480 but remained childless.

== Bibliography ==
- Mikołaj Kamieniecki, Polski Słownik Biograficzny, T. 11, s. 517

== See also ==
- Lublin Voivode
