= Bazyli Wójtowicz =

Polish sculptor

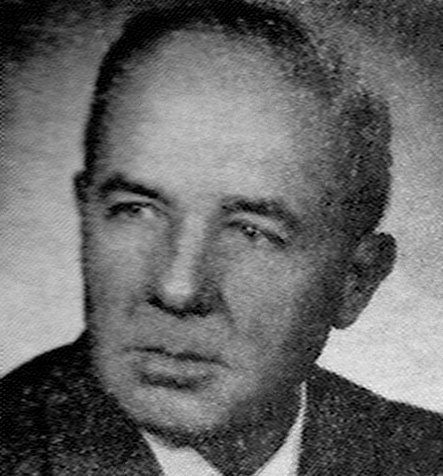
- Born: 2 April 1899; Czarnorzeki, Poland
- Died: 3 April 1985 (aged 86); Poznań, Poland
- Occupation: Sculptor

Bazyli Wójtowicz (2 April 1899 – 3 April 1985) was a Polish sculptor. His work was part of the sculpture event in the art competition at the 1936 Summer Olympics.
