= Konstanty Ostrogski =

Lithuanian military leader (c. 1460 – 1530)

Konstanty Ostrogski Grand Hetman of Lithuania
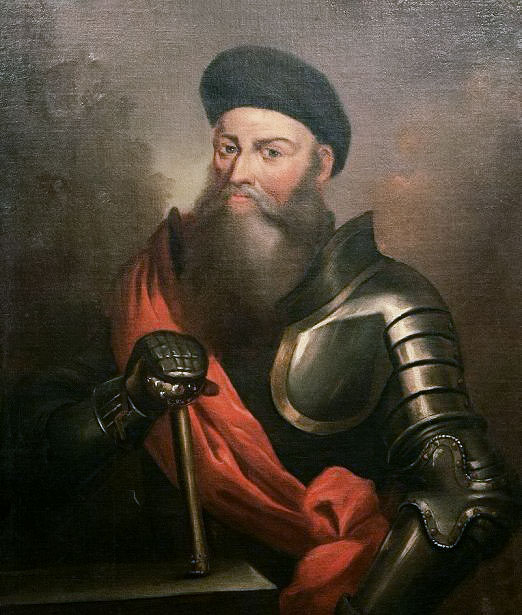
- Portrait, 18th century
- Born: c. 1460; Ostroh, Grand Duchy of Lithuania (now Ukraine)
- Died: 10 August 1530
- Burial place: Dormition Cathedral of the Kyiv Pechersk Lavra
- Spouse(s): Tatiana Koretska, Aleksandra Słucka
- Children: Illia Ostrogski, Konstanty Wasyl Ostrogski
- Military career
- Allegiance: Grand Duchy of Lithuania
- Branch: Army of the Grand Duchy of Lithuania
- Rank: Grand hetman of Lithuania
- Conflicts: Crimean–Nogai slave raids; Battle of Ochakiv (1497); Battle of Wisniowiec (1512); Battle of Sokal (1519); Ottoman-Tatar raid on Podolia; Battle of Trembowlą (1524); Battle of Olshanitsa; Muscovite-Lithuanian Wars; Battle of Vedrosha (1500); Battle of Orsha (1514); Siege of Opochka (1517); Glinski rebellion; Siege of Slutsk (1508)

Konstanty Ostrogski
- Coat of arms
- Noble family: Ostrogski

Konstanty Iwanowicz Ostrogski (Note: Ruthenian: Костинтин Иванович Wстрозкии; Ukrainian: Костянтин Іванович Острозький, romanized: Kostiantyn Ivanovych Ostrozkyi; Lithuanian: Konstantinas Ostrogiškis.) (c. 1460 – 10 August 1530) was a Ruthenian prince and magnate of the Grand Duchy of Lithuania. He later had the title of grand hetman of Lithuania from 11 September 1497 until his death in 1530.

== Career ==
Ostrogski began his military career under John I Albert, King of Poland. He took part in successful campaigns against the Tatars and the Grand Principality of Moscow. For his victory near Ochakiv against Mehmed I Giray's forces, he was awarded with the title of Grand Hetman of Lithuania. He was the first person to receive this title. However, during a war with Muscovy, he was defeated in the Battle of Vedrosha (1500) and held captive for three years. In 1503, he managed to escape and joined king Sigismund I the Old, who allowed him to retain his post as a hetman.

In 1508 Ostrogski defeated the forces of rebellious prince Michael Glinski, forcing him and his supporters to emigrate to Moscow. As one of the main military leaders (alongside with Mikołaj Firlej and Mikołaj Kamieniecki) of the Polish-Lithuanian alliance, he continued to wage war against the Muscovites, and in 1512, achieved a great victory against the Tatars in the Battle of Wisniowiec.

In 1514, another war with the Russians began and he became the commander-in-chief of all the Polish and Lithuanian forces (amounting to up to 35,000 soldiers). Among his subordinates were Jerzy Radziwiłł, Janusz Świerczowski, Witold Sampoliński and the future Hetman of the Crown Jan Tarnowski. On 8 September 1514 he achieved a significant victory in the Battle of Orsha, defeating the army of Vasili III of Russia. However, in 1517, his attempt to besiege the Russian fortress of Opochka became a serious defeat that destroyed any hopes to reconquer Smolensk.

Ostrogski died in 1530 as a well-respected military commander. Despite his steady loyalty to Catholic Poland as well as an old feud with an Orthodox Russia, Ostrogski himself remained a devout Orthodox in traditions of his family. He gave generously for construction of Eastern Orthodox churches and sponsored the creation of many church-affiliated schools for the Orthodox children. As one of the wealthiest Orthodox nobles he was buried in the Dormition Cathedral of the Kiev Pechersk Lavra.

== Legacy ==
He is one of the characters on the famous painting by Polish painter Jan Matejko, Prussian Homage.

The town of Starokostiantyniv still bears his name. The Lithuanian–Polish–Ukrainian Brigade is also named after him. For his wars against Crimea see Crimean-Nogai Raids, years 1508–1527, including Battle of Olshanitsa.

On 24 August 2021, Lithuanian President Gitanas Nausėda and Lithuanian First Lady Diana Nausėdienė personally participated in the inauguration ceremony of the restored in the Dormition Cathedral of the Kyiv Pechersk Lavra. The restored tombstone authors are two Ukrainian sculptors Oles Sydoruk, Borys Krylov, and one Lithuanian sculptor Arūnas Sakalauskas.

== Family ==
He had two wives: Tatiana Koretska, daughter of Simeon Olshanski. He married secondly Aleksandra Słucka who was daughter of Anastasia Slutskaya. He had two sons: Illia Ostrogski with Koretska, and Konstanty Wasyl Ostrogski with Słucka.

== Ancestry ==
Ancestors of Konstanty Ostrogski

8. Feodor Ostrogski
4. Vasily Fedorovich Ostrogski
9. Agatha Czurylowna
2. Ivan Vasilyevich Ostrogski
10. Yamont Tuluntovich of Ketsk
5. Hanka Agafia Yamont
1.Konstanty Ivanovich Ostrogski
12. Vladimir Olgerdovich
6. Ivan Vladimirovich Belsky
13. Anna
3. Maria Ivanovna Bleiska
14. Andrew Ivanovich of Halshany
7. Vasilisa Olshanska
15. Alexandra Dmitrievna of Drutsk

== See also ==
- Lithuanian nobility
- Ostrogski family
- List of szlachta
