= Augustdorf (film) =

2025 Ukrainian documentary film

- Августдорф: від однієї з найбільших німецьких колоній Галичини до вулиці-пустки
- Directed by: Stepan Penkaliuk
- Written by: Stepan Penkaliuk; Andrii Boida
- Starring: Andrii Boida; Ivan Khomiak
- Narrated by: Stepan Penkaliuk
- Cinematography: Nazar Vintoniuk; Roman Kocherzhuk
- Edited by: Volodymyr Karazub
- Production company: Suspilne Ivano-Frankivsk
- Release date: January 25, 2025
- Running time: 18 minutes
- Country: Ukraine
- Language: Ukrainian

Augustdorf (Ukrainian: Августдорф) is a 2025 Ukrainian documentary film produced by Suspilne Ivano-Frankivsk. Created by journalist Stepan Penkaliuk and historian Andrii Boida, the film chronicles the history of the former German colony of Augustdorf near Sniatyn in Ivano-Frankivsk Oblast, from its founding in the 19th century and the 1939 deportation of its German residents to its post-World War II resettlement by Ukrainians deported from Zakerzonia, including Zamishantsi and Lemkos.

== Synopsis ==
The documentary traces the founding, development, and disappearance of the German colony of Augustdorf in present-day Ivano-Frankivsk Oblast. Using archival documents, field research, and oral testimonies, it examines the colony's school system, religious life centered on the local Lutheran church, and everyday life during World War I, the interwar period, and the Soviet annexation.

The film devotes particular attention to the surviving Lutheran church, the old and new cemeteries, and the post-war resettlement of the area by Zamishantsi deported from Bonarówka in 1945, as well as Lemkos and settlers from the Jarosław region in 1946–1947, illustrated through the family histories of the Stanchak, Khomiak, and Kostyniuk families.

== Production ==
Filming took place in Sniatyn and Ivano-Frankivsk in October and November 2024. Alongside historian Andrii Boida, the film featured Zamishantsi deportees (Yu. Holei, I. Khomiak) and descendants of residents from the neighboring hamlet of Terebezhi (T. Savchuk, L. Stoliarska). Locations included surviving German colonists' houses—such as the home of blacksmith Philipp Kopp—and the banks of the Turetskyi Potik.

Primary historical records were sourced from the State Archives of Ivano-Frankivsk Oblast, where several scenes were filmed. Originally planned as a ten-minute television report, the project was expanded into a full documentary special by Suspilne Ivano-Frankivsk following the initial October 2024 shoot, with additional filming in Sniatyn in late November 2024.

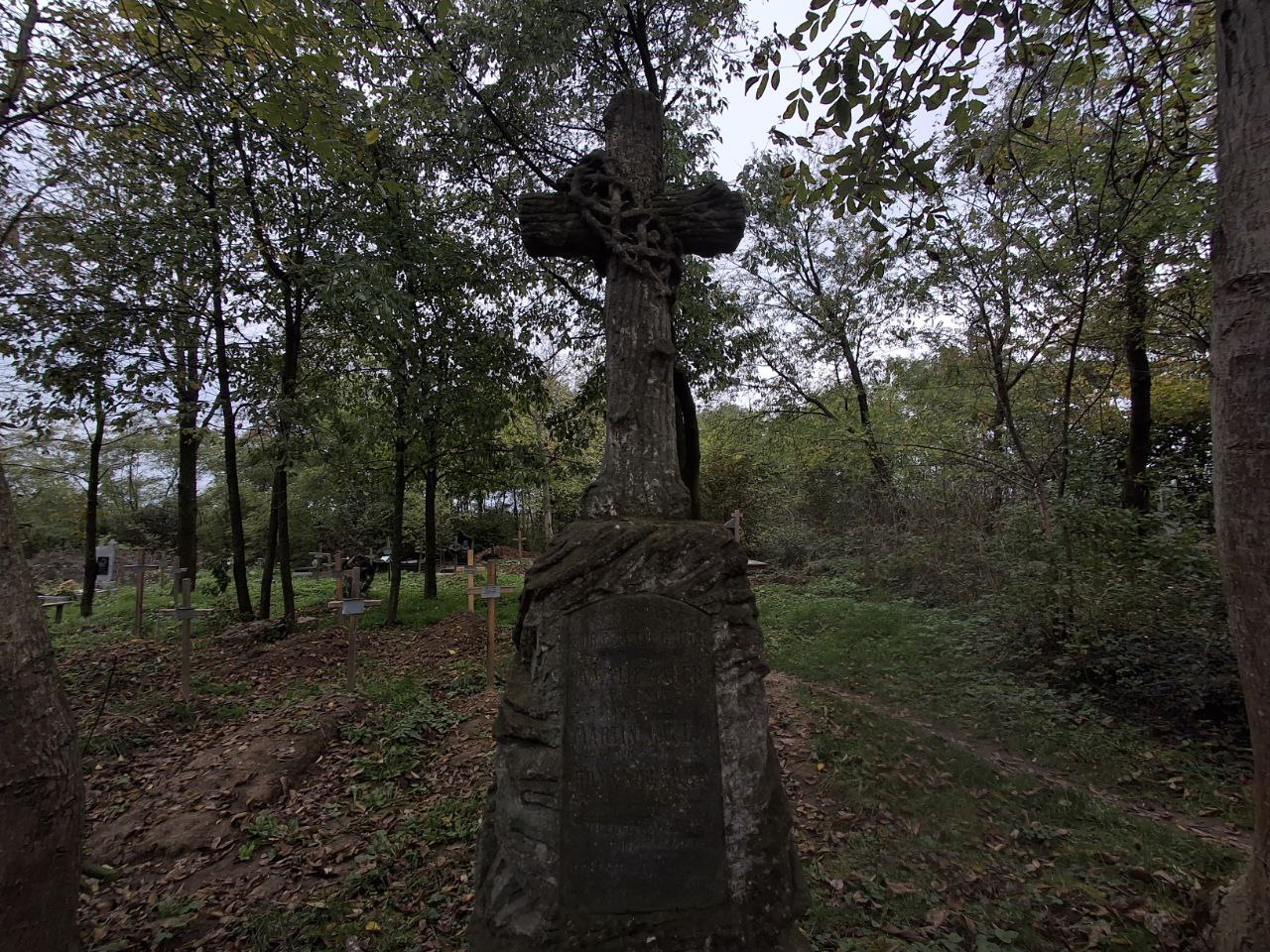
Filming location at the Augustdorf cemetery, 2024

During filming in October 2024

Map of the Sniatyn area featured in the film, June 2025

== Cast ==
- Andrii Boida — historian and great-grandson of Augustdorf settlers
- Ivan Khomiak — Augustdorf resident, Zamishanyn
- Tetiana Savchuk — granddaughter of Augustdorf residents
- Lesia Stoliarska — granddaughter of Augustdorf residents
- Stepan Penkaliuk — narrator

== Release and screenings ==
Augustdorf premiered on 25 January 2025 on the YouTube channel and social media platforms of Suspilne Ivano-Frankivsk. The release drew engagement from Zamishantsi diaspora communities in Poland and descendants of former Augustdorf colonists in North America, including Margaret Roll Graham of Canada, a granddaughter of the Stettner family, who shared family photographs and memoirs with the filmmakers.

On 5 June 2025, an in-person screening and discussion with the creators was held at the Sniatyn House of Culture for roughly 70 attendees.

In August 2025, Suspilne and the NGO Docudays UA included Augustdorf in a series of Independence Day screenings across the DOCU/CLUB network in Ukraine and abroad. Screenings took place at the Dnipropetrovsk Regional Library for Children on 18 August 2025 for internally displaced persons from Bakhmut, Lysychansk, and Kharkiv, and in Belgium in October 2025.

== Reception and awards ==
In July 2025, historian Andrii Boida received the Marko Cheremshyna Literary and Artistic Prize in Sniatyn for his work on the film and the popularization of Pokuttia's history.

In a review published in the proceedings of the 15th Bukovinian International Historical and Regional Studies Conference (2025), researcher Danyil Khomutetskyi praised the film's chronological structure and the cohesion between the pre-1939 and post-1945 narratives, while noting that certain episodes in the colony's history remained only partially explored.

== Sources ==
- Boida, Andrii (2025). "Vyvchennia istorii nimetskoi kolonii Augustdorf shliakhom stvorennia dokumentalnoho filmu (2024–2025)". Naukovi horyzonty XXI stolittia: multydystsyplinarni doslidzhennia (in Ukrainian). Uzhhorod: Uzhhorod National University. pp. 403–407.
- Boida, Andrii (2025). "Spivpratsia z komandoiu "Suspilne Ivano-Frankivsk" dlia vysvitlennia istorii deportatsii nimtsiv ta ukraintsiv (1939–1945 rr.)". Sniatyn (in Ukrainian) (23): 60–73.
- Khomutetskyi, Danyil (2025). "Dokumentalnyi film "Augustdorf": perevahy ta nedoliky proiektu". XV Bukovynska mizhnarodna istoryko-kraieznavcha konferentsiia (in Ukrainian). Chernivtsi: Tekhnodruk. pp. 385–387.
