= Sucha Góra TV Tower =

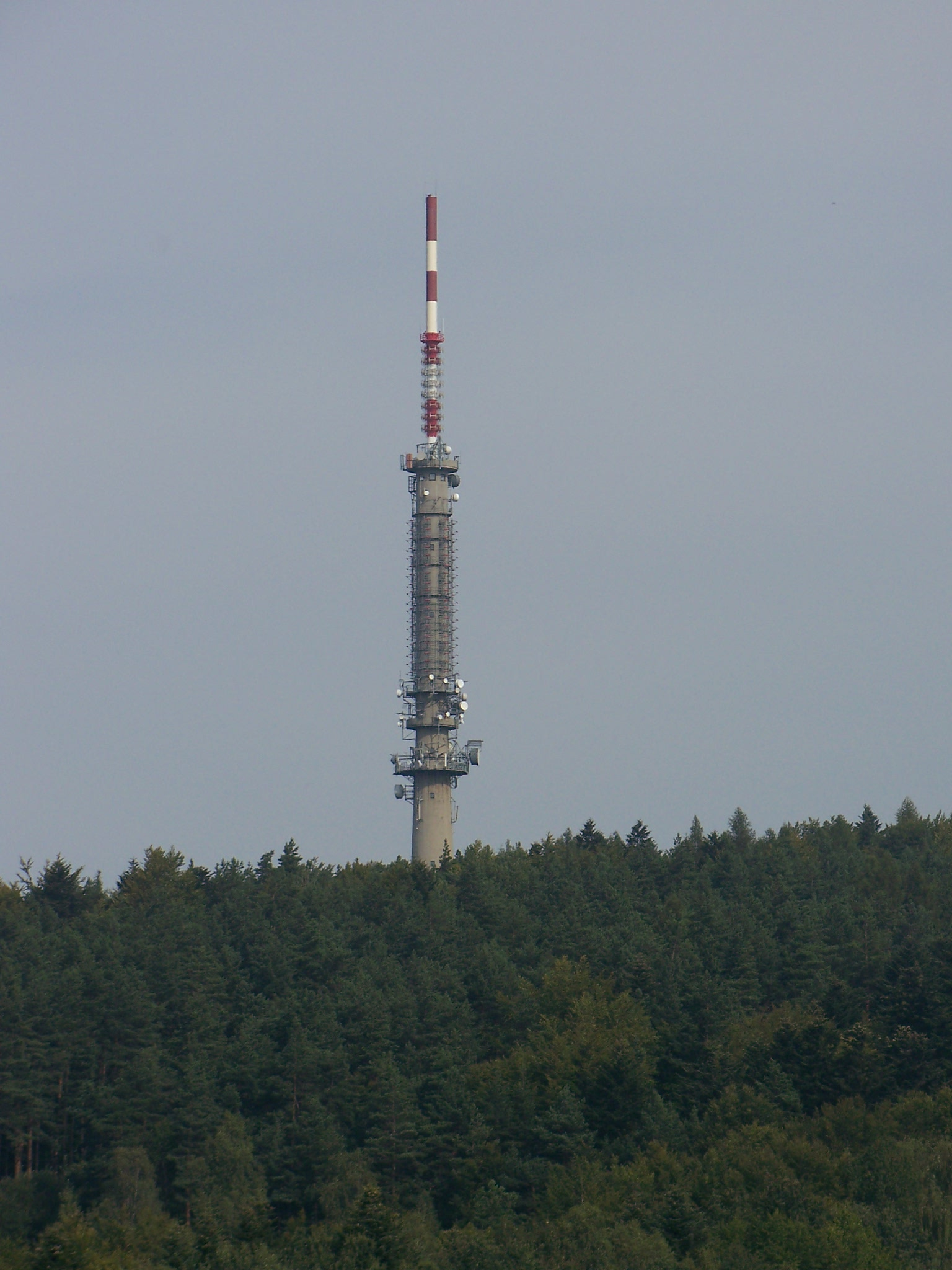
- Interactive map of the Sucha Góra TV Tower area

General information
- Status: Completed
- Type: Reinforced concrete Tower
- Location: Czarnorzeki, Poland
- Completed: 29 December 1962

Height
- Height: 149 m (488.85 ft)

Sucha Góra TV Tower
- Coordinates: 49°45′22″N 21°48′58″E

Sucha Góra TV Tower ( Polish: RTCN Sucha Góra) is a 149-metre-tall (489 ft) TV tower of reinforced concrete, situated on the Sucha Góra mountain north of Czarnorzeki, Subcarpathian Voivodeship in Poland at 49°45′22″N 21°48′58″E. Sucha Góra TV tower was built in 1962.

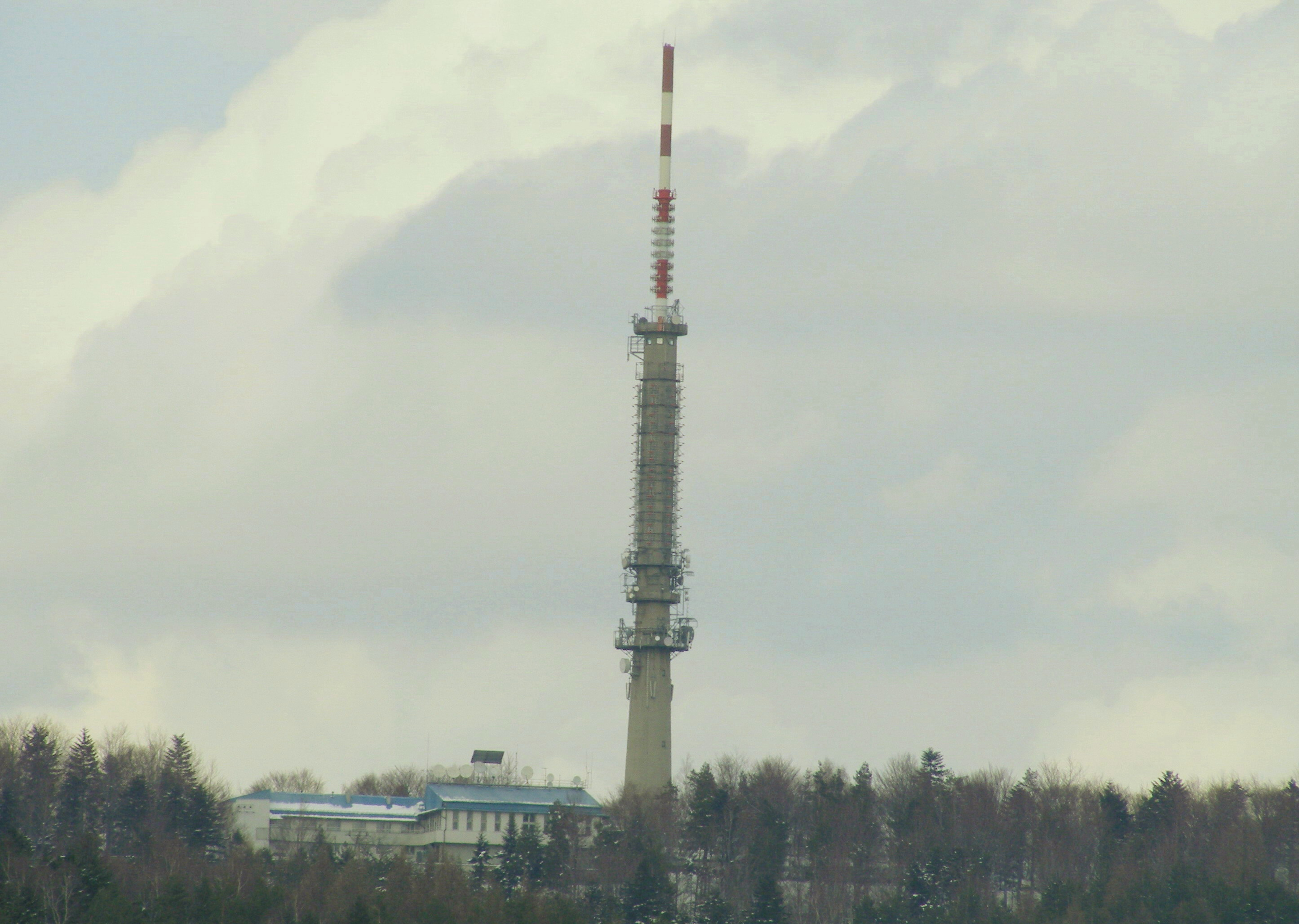
View at Broadcasting Center Sucha Góra

== Transmitted Programmes ==
=== Radio ===
Program	Frequency MHz	ERP kW
Polskie Radio Program 1	88,00	120
Radio Rzeszów	90,50	120 kW
Polskie Radio Trójka	92,00	120
Radio RMF FM	100,10	120
Radio Zet	107,40	30

== Digital Television MPEG-4 ==
Multiplex Number	Programme in Multiplex	Frequency MHz	Channel	ERP kW	Polarisation	Antenna Diagram around (ND) / directional (D)	Modulation	FEC
MUX 1	Fokus TV; Stopklatka TV; TVP ABC; TV Trwam; Eska TV; TTV; Polo TV; ATM Rozrywka	722	52	100	Horizontal	ND	64 QAM	3/4
MUX 2	Polsat; TVN; TV4; TV Puls; TVN 7; Puls 2; TV6; Super Polsat	562	32	100	Horizontal	ND	64 QAM	3/4
MUX 3	TVP1 HD; TVP2 HD; TVP Rzeszów; TVP Kultura; TVP Historia; TVP Polonia; TVP Rozrywka; TVP Info	538	29	100	Horizontal	D	64 QAM	5/6
