= Terebezhi (near Sniatyn) =

Terebezhi Теребежі
- 1901 map of the Sniatyn area
- Interactive map of Terebezhi
- Coordinates: 48°29′33″N 25°35′40″E
- Country: Ukraine
- Oblast: Ivano-Frankivsk Oblast
- Raion: Kolomyia Raion
- Hromada: Sniatyn urban hromada
- Established: Late 18th century
- Disestablished: c. 1950

Terebezhi (Ukrainian: Теребежі) was a former Ukrainian–Polish khutir (hamlet) that existed from the late 18th century until the mid-20th century. Geographically, it was located north of the former German colony of Augustdorf, near Sniatyn in Ivano-Frankivsk Oblast, western Ukraine. The hamlet was inhabited predominantly by Ukrainian and Polish families and bordered the villages of Potichok and Stetseva. The fields surrounding Terebezhi were considered highly fertile, and the Turetskyi Potik stream flowed through the settlement, irrigating the lands of local German and Ukrainian farmers.

In the late 19th century and during World War I, Terebezhi was frequently marked on Austrian civilian and military maps as a separate settlement. The hamlet ceased to exist no later than the 1950s due to urbanization processes around Sniatyn and the depopulation of the settlement.

== Geography ==
According to Mykhailo Bazhanskyi, the toponym "Terebezhi" referred to the fields north of Mount Kohutova, west of the Turetskyi Potik stream, and northeast of the village of Potichok. The name had been known for centuries and was recorded on general staff maps.

According to the recollections of Zynovii Butso, drained fields stretched north of Augustdorf, intersected from west to east by a series of valleys—First Valley, Second Valley, Third Valley, and so on—extending up to Terebezhi near Stetseva, where the Doloshytskyi family (originally from near Lutcha) lived. Streams flowed from these valleys into the Turetskyi Potik, which ran from north to south toward the village of Kulachyn and joined the Prut River. In Butso's memoirs describing the second half of the 1940s, Terebezhi appears as a prominent landmark in the local landscape and community life.

== History ==
Terebezhi is documented in historical accounts as a settlement adjacent to the German colony of Augustdorf, which was founded by German colonists in the 1830s. Unlike Augustdorf, Terebezhi was populated mainly by Ukrainian and Polish families. Another nearby settlement was the village of Potichok, situated a few kilometers away. The surrounding agricultural lands were renowned for high crop yields, watered by the nearby Turetskyi Potik.

During the late 19th century and World War I, Terebezhi regularly appeared on Austro-Hungarian civilian and military maps as a distinct inhabited locality. The hamlet disappeared between 1939–1940 and the 1950s as a result of urban expansion around Sniatyn and the lack of permanent residents.

== Sources ==
- Bazhanskyi, Mykhailo (1982). Krasa Sniatynshchyny: Riky, potoky, lisy, luhy, sady, mista i sela ta vysoka materialna i dukhova kultura yikhnikh zhyteliv: Haslova entsyklopediia (in Ukrainian). Detroit. p. 219.
- Pashchak, Yaroslav (2001). Rodymyi krai, selo rodyme: dokumentalnyi narys (PDF) (in Ukrainian). Introduction by Z. Butso. Kyiv: Veselka. p. 151. ISBN 966-01-0150-3.
- Penkaliuk, Stepan; Polivchak, Ruslana (25 January 2025). "Yak vynyk i znyk Avhustdorf: istoriia kolyshnoi nimetskoi kolonii na mezhi Ivano-Frankivskoi ta Chernivetskoi oblastei". Suspilne Ivano-Frankivsk (in Ukrainian).
