= Population exchange between Poland and Soviet Belarus =

1940s population resettlements

The population exchange between Poland and Soviet Belarus at the end of World War II (1944–1947) was based on an agreement signed on 9 September 1944 by the Byelorussian SSR with the newly-formed Polish Committee of National Liberation (PKWN). It stipulated the resettlement of ethnic Belarusians from Poland to Belarus and of ethnic Poles and Jews who had Polish citizenship before September 17, 1939 (date of the Soviet Invasion of Poland) from Belarus to Poland, in accordance with the resolutions of the Yalta and Tehran conferences and the plans about the new Belarus–Poland border. Similar agreements were signed with the Ukrainian SSR (see Population exchange between Poland and Soviet Ukraine) and the Lithuanian SSR (see Population exchange between Poland and Soviet Lithuania); the three documents are commonly known as the Republican Agreements.

== Transfers ==
In contrast to actions in the Ukrainian SSR, the communist officials in the Byelorussian SSR did not actively support deportation of Poles. Belarusian officials made it difficult for Polish activists to communicate with tuteishians – people who were undecided as to whether they considered themselves Polish or Belarusian. Much of the rural population, who usually had no official identity documents, were denied the "right" of repatriation on the basis that they did not have documents stating they were Polish citizens. In what was described as a "fight for the people", Polish officials attempted to get as many people repatriated as possible, whereas the Belarusian officials tried to retain them, particularly the peasants, while deporting most of the Polish intelligentsia. It is estimated that about 150,000 to 250,000 people were deported from Belarus. Similar numbers were registered as Poles but forced by the Belarusian officials to remain in Belarus, or were outright denied registration as Poles.

In response, Poland followed a similar process in regards to the Belarusian population of the territory of the Białystok Voivodeship, which was partially retained by Poland after World War II. It sought to retain some of the Belarusian people.

=== Belarusians to Belarus ===
Part of the lands with a significant Belarusian population (Białystok and its surroundings) were initially assigned to the Byelorussian SSR as "Belastok Voblast", but in September 1944, it was returned to Poland. The eastern parts of this area continue to have a significant Belarusian population. According to the Polish census of 2002, there were 46,041 Belarusians (3.9%) in Podlaskie Voivodeship.

The transfer was completed by July 1946, and of 160,000 ethnic Belarusians, about 80,000 (according to Jasiak) or 38,000 (according to Mironowicz) were deported to the Byelorussian SSR and resettled there.

=== Poles and Jews to Poland ===
Initially, the residents of the westernmost parts of Western Belarus were hesitant to register for resettlement, because they hoped that these parts, such as Grodno, would remain in Poland, and this view was propagated by the Polish underground. However, as the situation clarified, the public opinion, including the underground, adopted the opposite stance.

For example, these are the numbers for the resettled people from Grodno:

- Polish families/family members: registered: 7,384/18,861; denied (for various reasons, e.g., missed the assigned train: 2142/5685; decided to stay: 159/4441; moved: 6033/14256
- Jewish families/family members: registered: 108/178; moved: 101/170

== Property loss ==
According to two Polish decrees of September 5, 1947 and July 27, 1949, the people resettled to the Byelorussian SSR lost all their property left in Poland without compensation, in contradiction with the "Republican Agreements" which stipulated a fair compensation for all property, with the exception of land.

== Name of the document ==
- Polish title:Układ pomiędzy Polskim Komitetem Wyzwolenia Narodowego a Rządem Białoruskiej Socjalistycznej Republiki Rad dotyczący ewakuacji obywateli polskich z terytorium B.S.S.R. i ludności Białoruskiej z terytorium Polski, podpisany w Lublinie 9 września 1944 r., art. 3 ust. 6 i ust. 7, In: Biuletyn nr 4/2002. Wybór orzecznictwa Europejskiego Trybunału Praw Człowieka w sprawach polskich, Vol. III, pp. I-VII, as cited by Andrzej Kiedrzyn
- Belarusian title: Пагадненне паміж Польскім камітэтам нацыянальнага вызвалення і ўрадам БССР аб эвакуацыі польскіх грамадзян з тэрыторыі БССР і беларускага насельніцтва з тэрыторыі Польшчы
- Translation: "Agreement between the Polish Committee of National Liberation and the Government of the Byelorussian Soviet Sovialist Republic Regarding the Evacuation of Polish Citizens from the Territory of the B.S.S.R. and the Belarusian Population from the Territory of Poland, Signed in Lublin on September 9, 1944")

== See also ==
- Belarusian minority in Poland
- Polish minority in Belarus
