= Korczyna, Podkarpackie Voivodeship =

Korczyna
- Village
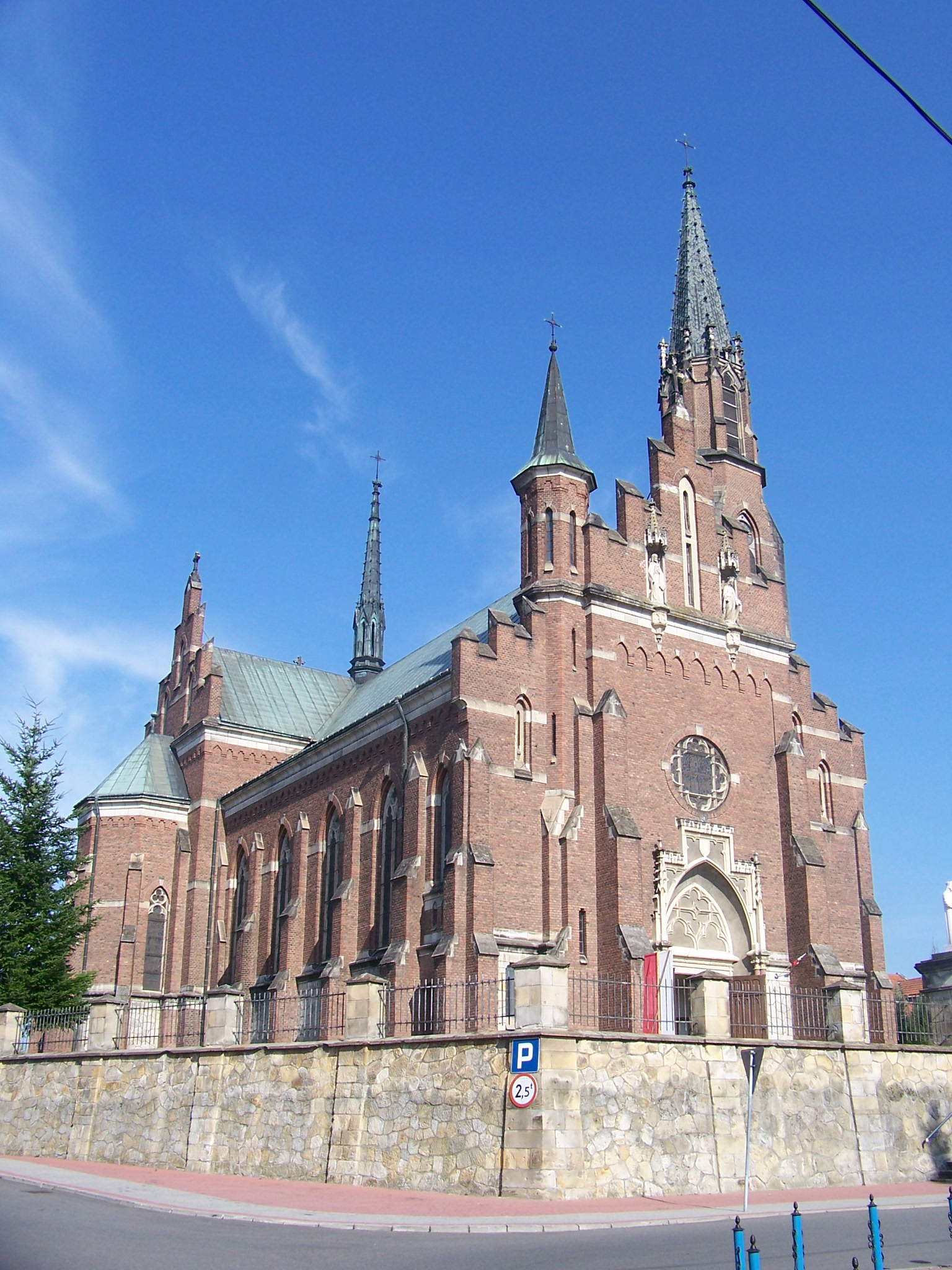
- Church of the Virgin Mary, Queen of Poland

- Location within Poland
- Coordinates: 49°43′20″N 21°49′4″E
- Country: Poland
- Voivodeship: Subcarpathian
- County: Krosno
- Gmina: Korczyna
- Population: 6,000

Korczyna (pronounced [kɔrˈt͡ʂɨna]) is a village in Krosno County, Subcarpathian Voivodeship, in south-eastern Poland. It is the seat of the gmina of Gmina Korczyna.

== Jewish history ==
Korczyna had a large Jewish community before the Holocaust. Though the Jewish Study Centre and synagogue are no longer present, the Korczyna Jewish Cemetery is still present in the outskirts of Korczyna.

== People ==
- Wojciech Smarzowski Polish film director
