= Siege of Opochka =

- Part of Fourth Muscovite–Lithuanian War
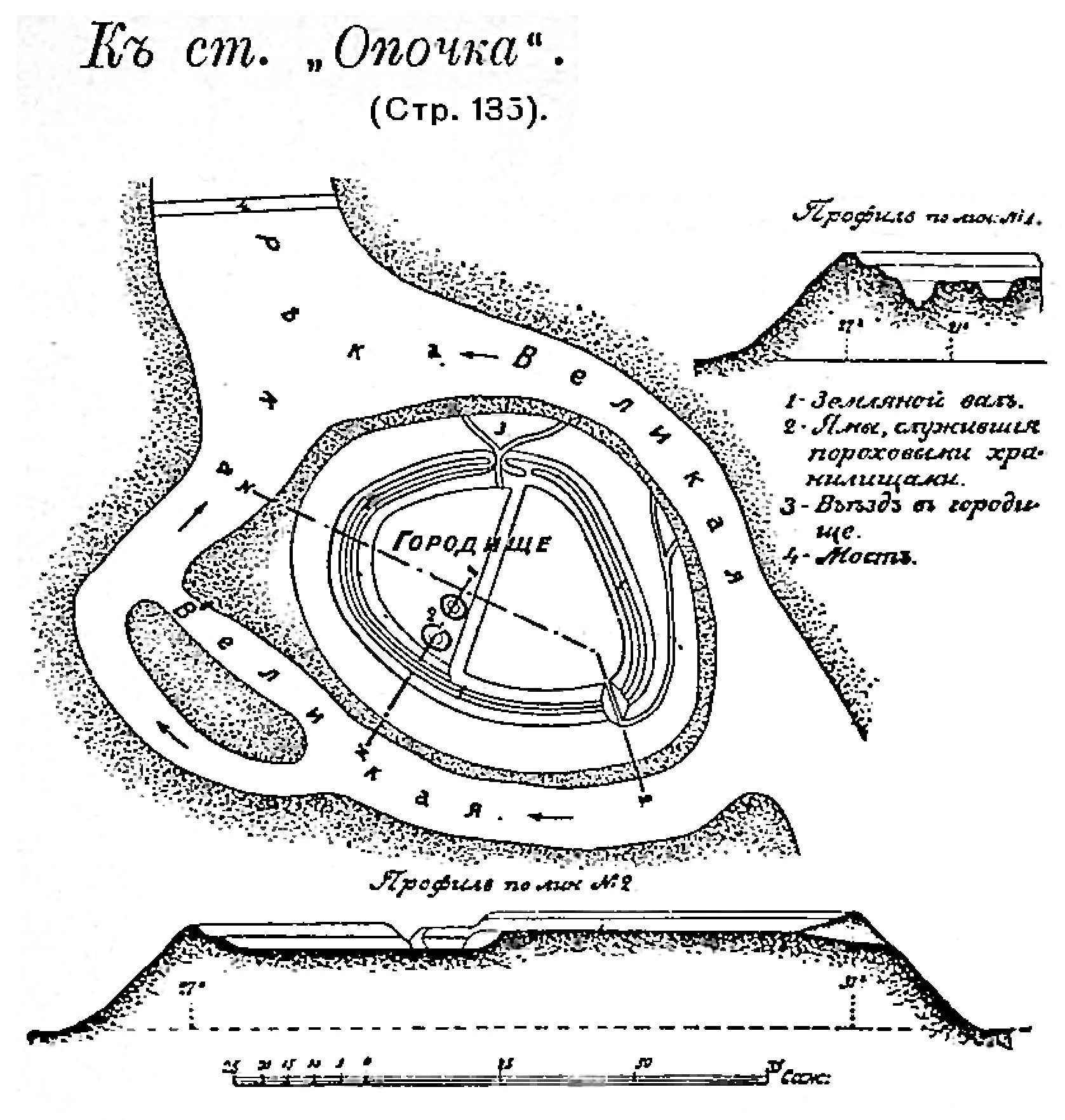
| Date | 20 September – 18 October 1517 |
| Location | Opochka fortress 56°42′43″N 28°39′23″E |
| Result | Russian victory |

Belligerents
| Grand Duchy of Lithuania; Kingdom of Poland | Grand Duchy of Moscow |

Commanders and leaders
| Konstanty Ostrogski; Janusz Świerczowski; Jerzy Radziwiłł | Vasily Morozov-Saltykov; Fyodor Lopata Telepnev-Obolensky; Ivan Lacki |

Strength
| 14,000 (Note: The Lithuanian troops themselves had about 6,000 at their disposal, with a contingent of 4,000 mercenaries. Later, another 4,000-strong detachment went to reinforce.) | 150; 10,000-12,000 in blockade relief detachments |

Casualties and losses
| About 5,000 | Unknown |

The siege of Opochka was an unsuccessful attempt by the Grand Duchy of Lithuania and the Kingdom of Poland to conquer the Russian fortress of Opochka during the Fourth Muscovite–Lithuanian War.

Russian troops were able to successfully defend the fortress and inflict heavy damage on the Poles and Lithuanians, avenging the defeat at Orsha three years ago. The replies of the Polish king Sigismund did not describe the course of the siege, but the invented battle of Opochka, where the Russians allegedly lost.

== Sources ==
- Lobin, Alexei (2017). Оборона Опочки: «бесова деревня» против армии Константина Острожского [Defense of Opochka: "devilish village" against Konstantin Ostrogsky's army] (in Russian). Moscow: Русские витязи. ISBN 978-5-9909605-7-2.
