= Population exchange between Poland and Lithuanian SSR =

Exchange between Poland and Soviet Lithuania

The population exchange between Poland and Lithuanian SSR at the end of World War II (1944-1947) was based on an agreement signed on 9 September 1944 by the Lithuanian SSR with the newly formed Polish Committee of National Liberation (PKWN). It stipulated the resettlement of ethnic Lithuanians from Poland to Lithuania and of ethnic Poles and Jews who had Polish citizenship before 17 September 1939 (date of the Soviet Invasion of Poland) from Lithuania to Poland, in accordance with the resolutions of the Yalta and Tehran conferences and the plans about the new Lithuania–Poland border. Similar agreements were signed with the Ukrainian SSR (see Population exchange between Poland and Soviet Ukraine) and the Byelorussian SSR (see Population exchange between Poland and Soviet Belarus); the three documents are commonly known as the Republican Agreements.

== Implementation ==
The resettlement of ethnic Poles from Lithuania saw numerous delays. Local Polish clergy were active in agitating against leaving, and the underground press called those who had registered for repatriation traitors. Many ethnic Poles hoped that a post-war Peace Conference would assign the Vilnius region to Poland. After these hopes vanished, the number of people wanting to leave gradually increased, and they signed papers for the People's Republic of Poland State Repatriation Office representatives.

The Lithuanian communist party was dominated by a nationalist faction which supported the removal of the Polish intelligentsia, particularly from the highly contested Vilnius region. The city of Vilnius was considered a historical capital of Lithuania; however, in the early 20th century its population was around 40% Polish, 30% Jewish and 20% Russian and Belarusian, with only about 2–3% self-declared Lithuanians. The government considered the rural Polish population important to the agricultural economy, and believed those people would be relatively amenable to assimilation policies (Lithuanization).

But the government encouraged expulsion of Poles from Vilnius, and facilitated it. The result was a rapid depolonization and Lithuanization of the city (80% of Vilnius' Polish inhabitants were transferred to post-war Poland). Furthermore, the Lithuanian ideology of "Ethnographic Lithuania" declared that many people who identified as Polish were in fact "polonized Lithuanians". The rural population was denied the right to leave Lithuania, due to their lack of official pre-war documentation showing Polish citizenship. Contrary to the government's agreement with Poland, many individuals were threatened with either arrest or having to settle outstanding debts if they chose repatriation. Soviet authorities persecuted individuals connected to the Polish resistance (Armia Krajowa and Polish Underground State). In the end, about 50% of the 400,000 people registered for relocation were allowed to leave. Political scientist Dovilė Budrytė estimated that about 150,000 people left for Poland.
