= Battle of Sokal =

1519 battle of the Crimean–Nogai slave raids in Eastern Europe

Battle of Sokal (1519)
- Part of Crimean–Nogai slave raids in Eastern Europe
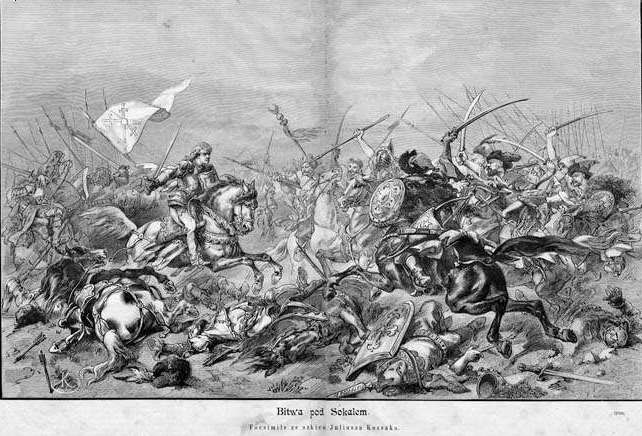
- Battle of Sokal
Date	2 August 1519
Location	Sokal
Result	Crimean victory

Belligerents
Kingdom of Poland; Grand Duchy of Lithuania	Crimean Khanate

Commanders and leaders
Konstanty Ostrogski	Bogatyr-Girey

Strength
7,000 men	40,000 men

Casualties and losses
1,200 killed	Unknown

The Battle of Sokal was a battle between the army of the Grand Duchy of Lithuania and the Kingdom of Poland under the command of the Grand Hetman of the Lithuanian Prince Konstanty Ostrogski against the Crimean Khanate, which took place on August 2, 1519. The battle ended in victory for the Crimeans.

== Battle of Olshanitsa ==
On July 1519, a large Crimean Tatar force of 40,000 men, crossed the Bug River. The Lithuanian hetman, Konstanty Ostrogski, gathered Podil and Galician nobility along the way. The combined Polish-Lithuanian forces set up a camp at the southern Bug River, not far from the city of Sokal. The Polish-Lithuanian army consisted of 7,000 men. Seeing the Crimeans numerical superiority, Ostrogski proposed not to engage them in an open battle but instead impose a maneuver on them by attacking them at night or while they were crossing as the Crimeans were overburdened with convoys and loot.

The Polish commanders refused the advice of Ostrogski, labeling him as indecisive. They advocated for an open battle. Ostrogski, not having the opportunity to convince his opponents of his plan, offered at least not to cross the river, but, using a strong position in the allied camp and wait for the approach of reinforcements for 600 Moldavian regiment soldiers. The Polish army was not able to convince him and decided to take on the Crimeans on their own without waiting for reinforcements.

On August 2, the Polish crown took their banners and began crossing the Bug River. They attacked the Crimean battle formations. The Crimeans, led by Bogatyr-Girey, used their usual tactic, feigned retreat, and lured them into the territory of Sokal, they began bombarding them with a hail of arrows which forced the Poles to retreat to the bank river. Ostrogski, seeing what was happening, led a force of 1,000 cavalry and attacked the flank of the Crimenas to cover the rear of the army. This improved the situation better for the moment; however, the Poles had to retreat to the right bank of the Bug River, suffering heavy losses. The army lost many knights and Osrtogski barely managed to break through the Crimenas lines and escape with his life. The Polish-Lithuanian army suffered 1,200 killed.

== Sources ==
- Dariusz Milewski, Konstanty Ostrogski as an Opponent of the Tatars in the Eyes of Polish Historians of the 16th Century.
- Cherkas Boris (2006), Ukraine in the political relations of the Grand Duchy of Lithuania with the Crimean Khanate (1515–1540).
