= Halyna Hrytskiv =

Ukrainian public and cultural figure, poet, publicist

- Галина Грицьків
- Born: Halyna Demianivna Hrytskiv; 14 March 1937; Węglówka, Podkarpackie Voivodeship
- Died: 17 November 2016 (aged 79); Chortkiv, Ternopil Oblast
- Education: Stanyslav Pedagogical Institute

Halyna Demianivna Hrytskiv (Ukrainian: Галина Дем'янівна Грицьків, 14 March 1937, Węglówka, Podkarpackie Voivodeship — 17 November 2016, Chortkiv, Ternopil Oblast) was a Ukrainian public and cultural figure, poet, publicist, and Easter egg maker. Honorary citizen of Chortkiv (2015).

== Biography ==
In 1945, she was deported from Lemkivshchyna to Yahilnytsia, Chortkiv Raion.

She studied at the Yahilnytsia School (1954). She graduated from the Faculty of History and Philology of the Stanyslaviv Pedagogical Institute (1959). She worked as a teacher of socio-economic disciplines at the Chortkiv Medical School (1959—2011).

=== Public activity ===
In Chortkiv, she was an active member of the public political organization People's Movement of Ukraine, deputy chairman of the Prosvita and Lemkivshchyna societies.

She took an active part in the revival of the public life of the city and the UGCC during the period of Ukraine's independence. She was a freelance correspondent for the regional newspaper Holos Narodu.

She was a member of the Chortkiv City Council and head of the social and cultural commission.

=== Personal life ===
Her husband is a Ukrainian orthopedic traumatologist, public figure, and publicist Stefan Hrytskiv (1935—2022). They have one son, Bohdan.

== Creative work ==
She wrote poems that were published in Raion and Oblast newspapers.

Her pysankas were exhibited at exhibitions in Chortkiv, Buchach, Ternopil, and Lviv (since 1992). She held her own master classes in Easter egg making.

== Awards and honors ==
- 25 Years of Independence of Ukraine Medal (19 August 2016)
- Excellence in Education of Ukraine (2015)
- Honorary Citizen of Chortkiv (2015)
- Laureate of the contest "Person of the Year" in the field of culture and art (2013, Chortkiv)

== Honoring the memory ==
On 20 November 2017, a memorial plaque to Halyna Hrytskiv was unveiled in Chortkiv. The plaque was installed on the facade of the house at 84 Taras Shevchenko Street, where she lived.

In 2019, a Chortkiv children's Easter egg painting competition was named after her.
