= Gmina Korczyna =

Gmina Korczyna Korczyna Commune
- Gmina
- Flag Coat of arms
- Interactive map of Gmina Korczyna
- Coordinates: 49°43′30″N 21°49′30″E
- Country: Poland
- Voivodeship: Subcarpathian
- County: Krosno County
- Seat: Korczyna

Area
  - Total: 92.08 km^{2} (35.55 sq mi)

Population (2006)
  - Total: 10,733
  - Density: 116.6/km^{2} (301.9/sq mi)
- Website: http://www.korczyna.pl

Gmina Korczyna is a rural gmina (administrative district) in Krosno County, Subcarpathian Voivodeship, in south-eastern Poland. Its seat is the village of Korczyna, which lies approximately 7 kilometres (4 mi) north-east of Krosno and 38 km (24 mi) south of the regional capital Rzeszów.

The gmina covers an area of 92.44 square kilometres (35.69 sq mi), and as of 2006 its total population is 10,733.

The gmina contains part of the protected area called Czarnorzeki-Strzyżów Landscape Park.

== Villages ==
Gmina Korczyna contains the villages and settlements of Czarnorzeki, Iskrzynia, Kombornia, Korczyna, Krasna, Węglówka and Wola Komborska.

== Neighbouring gminas ==
Gmina Korczyna is bordered by the city of Krosno and by the gminas of Haczów, Jasienica Rosielna, Krościenko Wyżne, Niebylec, Strzyżów and Wojaszówka.
