= Battle of Wisniowiec =

- Part of the Crimean–Nogai raids into East Slavic lands
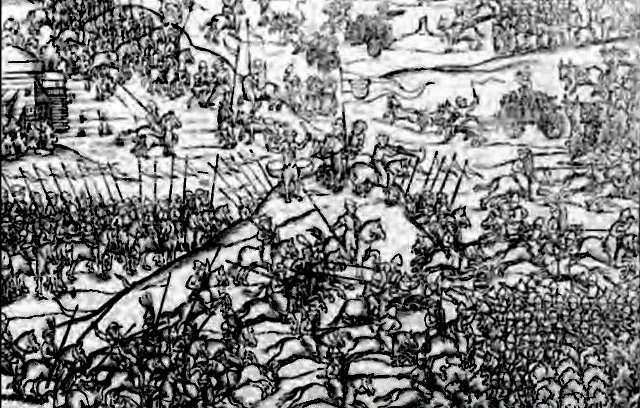
- April 28, 1512
| Date | April 28, 1512 |
| Location | Near Lopushne village in Ternopil Oblast |
| Result | Polish-Lithuanian victory |

Belligerents
| Kingdom of Poland; Grand Duchy of Lithuania | Crimean Khanate |

Commanders and leaders
| Mikołaj Kamieniecki; Konstanty Ostrogski | Meñli I Giray |

Strength
| 6,000 | 30,000 |

Casualties and losses
| 500 - 1,000 died | 10,000 - 16,000 died |

The Battle of Wisniowiec (also known as the Battle of Lopuszno) took place on 28 April 1512.

The combined Polish–Lithuanian forces under Grand Crown Hetman Mikołaj Kamieniecki and Grand Lithuanian Hetman Konstanty Ostrogski defeated the raid of the Crimean Tatars. The battle was fought in Lopushne near Wisniowiec.
