= Wilhelm Hauer =

Austro-Hungarian and Ukrainian army officer (born 1895)

- Wilhelm Gauer
- Wilhelm Hauer in 1940
- Born: 23 September 1895; Augustdorf (Sniatyn), Kingdom of Galicia and Lodomeria, Austria-Hungary
- Died: After 1940
- Education: Czech Technical University in Prague
- Occupations: Forestry engineer, farmer
- Spouse: Gertruda Prosch (m. 1921)
- Military career
- Allegiance: Austria-Hungary (until 1918); West Ukrainian People's Republic (1919)
- Branch: Austro-Hungarian Army (k.k. Landwehr); Ukrainian Galician Army
- Service years: 1916–1920
- Rank: Leutnant (Austria-Hungary); Poruchnyk (UHA)
- Units: 19th Landwehr Infantry Regiment; 55th Infantry Regiment; 2nd Regiment, 1st Brigade of Ukrainian Sich Riflemen
- Conflicts: World War I * Eastern Front; Polish–Ukrainian War * Vovchukhiv offensive
- Awards: Bronze Military Merit Medal with swords

Wilhelm Hauer (German: Wilhelm Gauer; Ukrainian: Вільгельм Гавер; 23 September 1895 – after 1940) was a Galician German military officer who served in the Austro-Hungarian Army during World War I and subsequently as a lieutenant (Ukrainian: поручник) in the Ukrainian Galician Army during the Polish–Ukrainian War.

== Biography ==
=== Early life and education ===
Wilhelm Hauer was born on 23 September 1895 into a farming and horse-breeding family in the German colony of Augustdorf (now part of Sniatyn in Ivano-Frankivsk Oblast, Ukraine), then part of the Kingdom of Galicia and Lodomeria in Austria-Hungary. His parents were Martin Hauer (1856–1916) and Amalia née Engel (1858–1926), whose family originated from the German colony of Frătăuții Vechi (German: Alt-Fratautz) in Bukovina. He was baptized on 3 November 1895 by Pastor Franz Schädel of Kolomyia.

Between 1907 and 1914, Hauer attended the Greek-Oriental Upper Secondary School (German: Die griechisch-orientalische Oberrealschule) in Chernivtsi (now Chernivtsi Lyceum No. 16 named after Yuriy Fedkovych).

=== Military service ===
During World War I, Hauer served on the Eastern Front in Galicia within the Imperial-Royal Landwehr of the Austro-Hungarian Army. In 1916, holding the rank of cadet-officer (German: Fähnrich), he served as a platoon commander in the 25th March Company of the 3rd Battalion, 19th Lemberg Landwehr Infantry Regiment (German: Schützenregiment Nr. 19). On 1 January 1917, he was promoted to lieutenant in the reserve (German: Leutnant der Reserve). By imperial decree of Emperor Charles I of Austria on 19 September 1917, Hauer was awarded the Bronze Military Merit Medal on the ribbon of the Military Merit Cross with swords for bravery and exemplary service in combat. In 1918, his final Austro-Hungarian posting was with the 55th Infantry Regiment.

Following the dissolution of Austria-Hungary and the proclamation of the West Ukrainian People's Republic in November 1918, Hauer voluntarily joined the Ukrainian Galician Army (UHA) in early February 1919. Serving as a second lieutenant (Ukrainian: четар) in the 2nd Regiment of the 1st Brigade of Ukrainian Sich Riflemen, he was promoted to first lieutenant (Ukrainian: поручник) on 1 March 1919. During the May 1919 offensive of General Haller's Army, Hauer was captured by Polish forces and interned at the prisoner-of-war camp in Strzałkowo.

=== Later life ===
Released from Polish captivity in 1920, Hauer completed higher education as a forestry engineer at the Czech Technical University in Prague. On 8 September 1921, in Hohenstadt (now Zábřeh, Czech Republic), he married Gertruda Prosch (born 1900). In the mid-1920s, the couple settled in the village of Borynia near Turka (Lviv Oblast), where Hauer worked in forestry management. They had two sons born in Borynia: Helmut (born 1927) and Hans (born 1931). Following his mother's death in 1926, Hauer inherited a one-fifth share of the family estate in Avhustdorf under a 1927 decree of the Sniatyn District Court.

After the Soviet annexation of Eastern Galicia and Volhynia in September 1939 and the subsequent Soviet–German population transfer agreements (Heim ins Reich), Hauer and his family departed in February 1940 for the Łódź area in German-occupied Poland, where many resettled Germans from Pokuttia were relocated.

== Family ==
During World War I, Hauer's family suffered severe losses. Facing a third Russian occupation of Avhustdorf, his parents evacuated to Upper Austria in June 1916, losing their property and livestock; his father Martin Hauer died in Peuerbach on 1 September 1916. Several of Hauer's siblings died young and were buried in the family tomb in Avhustdorf, including Ottilie (1901–1915), Edmund (1897–1917), and Elsa (1910–1919).

== Awards ==
- Bronze Military Merit Medal on the ribbon of the Military Merit Cross with swords (1917)
