= Krasna, Podkarpackie Voivodeship =

Krasna
- Village
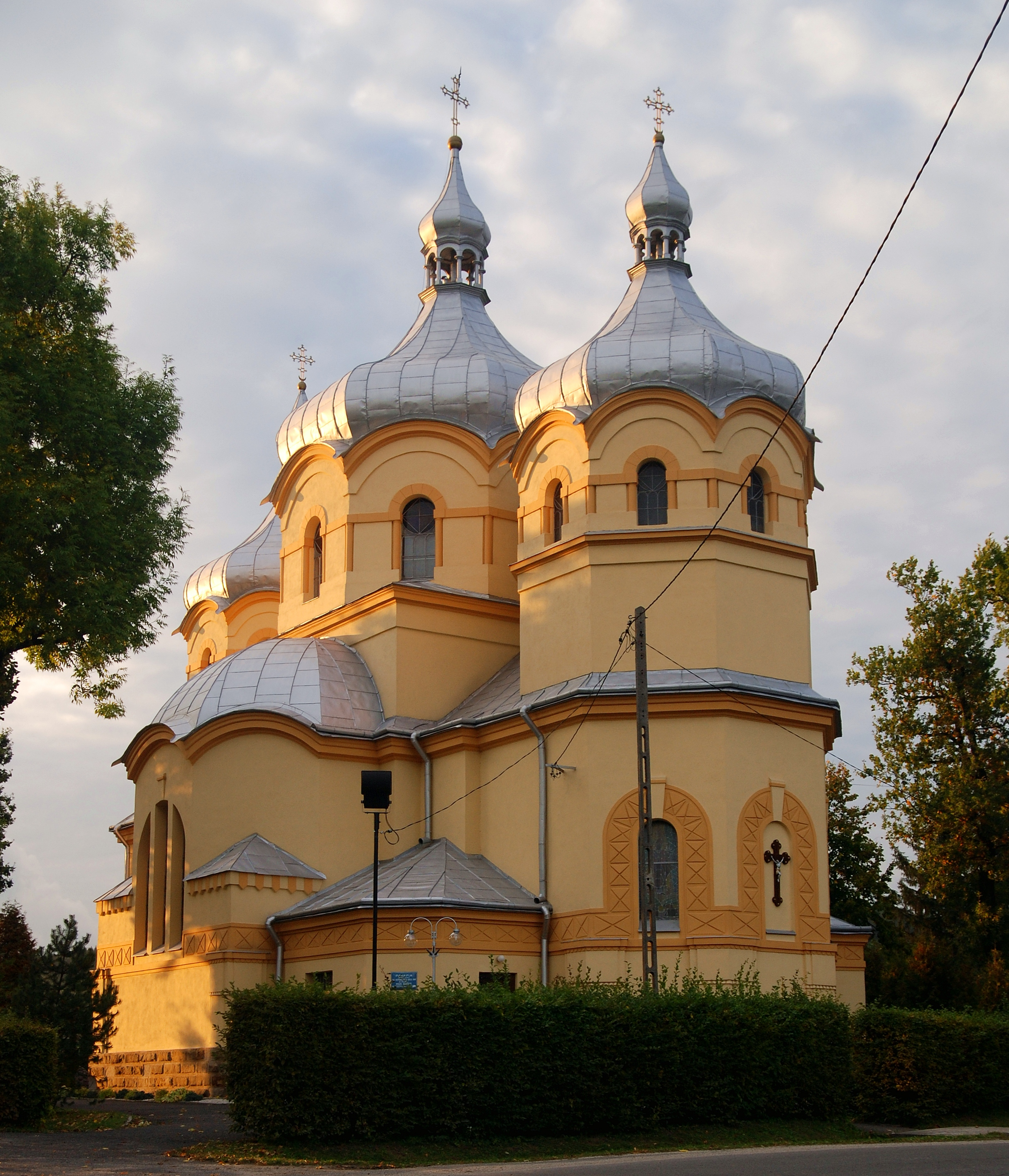
- Former Greek Catholic Church of Saint Michael

- Location within Poland
- Coordinates: 49°46′53″N 21°51′18″E
- Country: Poland
- Voivodeship: Subcarpathian
- County: Krosno
- Gmina: Korczyna

Krasna [ˈkrasna] is a village in the administrative district of Gmina Korczyna, within Krosno County, Subcarpathian Voivodeship, in south-eastern Poland.
