= Dolyniany =

Village in Chernivtsi Oblast, Ukraine

Coordinates: 48.4072°N 26.4292°E

Dolyniany (Ukrainian: Долиняни; Romanian: Dolineni) is a village in Dniester Raion, Chernivtsi Oblast, Ukraine. It belongs to Nedoboivtsi rural hromada, one of the hromadas of Ukraine.

At Dolyniany, a simple circular sanctuary with wooden columns was discovered, similar to the one from Grădiștea Muncelului, which proves the presence of the northern dacians: the costoboci.

Until 18 July 2020, Dolyniany belonged to Khotyn Raion. The raion was abolished in July 2020 as part of the administrative reform of Ukraine, which reduced the number of raions of Chernivtsi Oblast to three. The area of Khotyn Raion was merged into Dniester Raion.
