= Wola Komborska =

- Village
- Location within Poland
- Coordinates: 49°44′N 21°54′E
- Country: Poland
- Voivodeship: Subcarpathian
- County: Krosno
- Gmina: Korczyna

Wola Komborska [ˈvɔla kɔmˈbɔrska] is a village in the administrative district of Gmina Korczyna, within Krosno County, Subcarpathian Voivodeship, in south-eastern Poland.
