= Węglówka, Podkarpackie Voivodeship =

Węglówka
- Village
- Location within Poland
- Coordinates: 49°46′33″N 21°46′43″E
- Country: Poland
- Voivodeship: Subcarpathian
- County: Krosno
- Gmina: Korczyna
- Population (approx.): 900

Węglówka [vɛŋˈɡlufka] is a village in the administrative district of Gmina Korczyna, within Krosno County, Subcarpathian Voivodeship, in south-eastern Poland.

== People from Węglówka ==
- Halyna Hrytskiv (1937—2016), Ukrainian public and cultural figure, poet, publicist, and Easter egg maker
