= Kombornia =

- Village
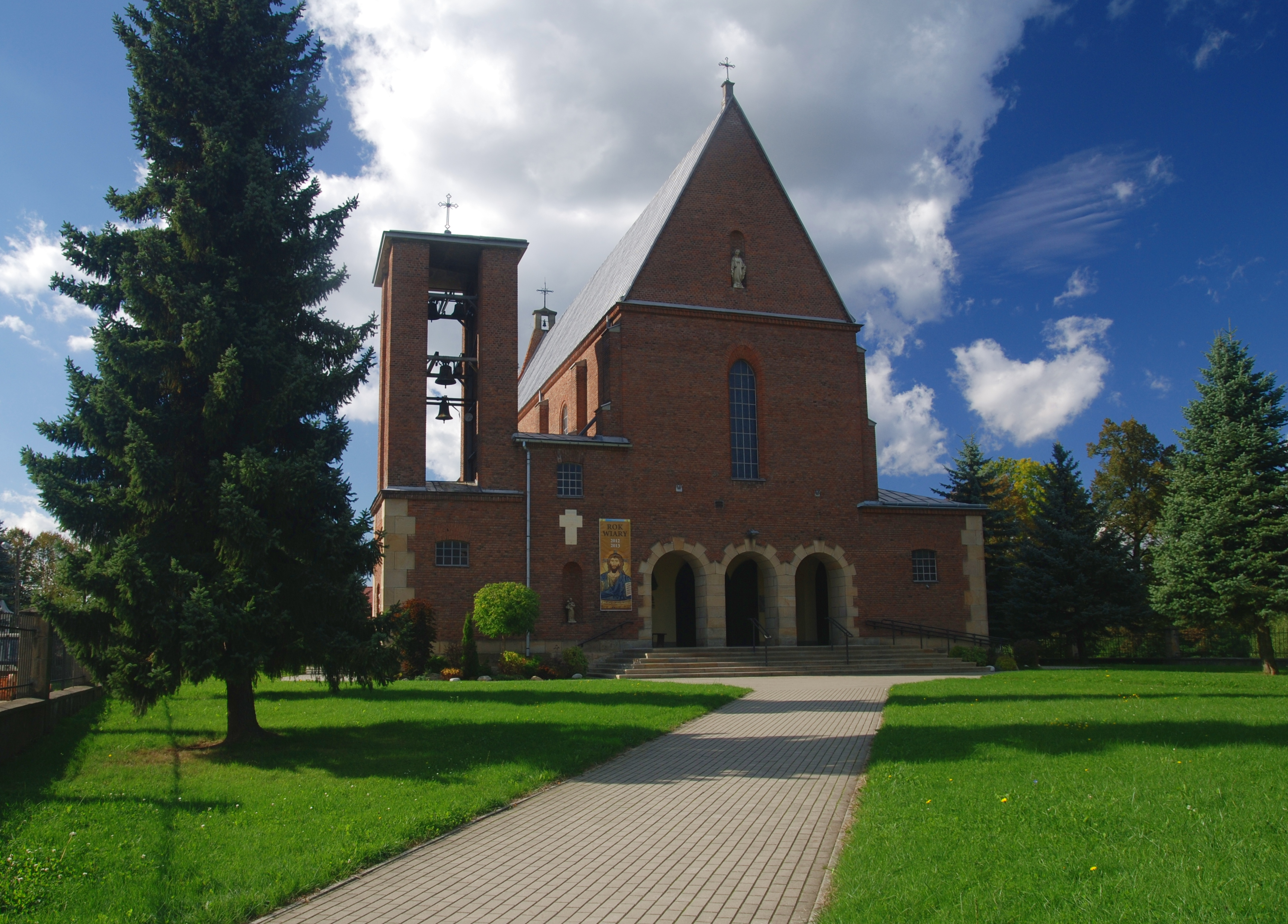
- Local Catholic church

- Location within Poland
- Coordinates: 49°42′51″N 21°52′29″E
- Country: Poland
- Voivodeship: Subcarpathian
- County: Krosno
- Gmina: Korczyna

Population
  - Total: 1,500
- Time zone: UTC+1 (CET)
  - Summer (DST): UTC+2 (CEST)
- Vehicle registration: RKR

Kombornia [kɔmˈbɔrɲa] is a village in the administrative district of Gmina Korczyna, within Krosno County, Subcarpathian Voivodeship, in south-eastern Poland.

Four Polish citizens were murdered by Nazi Germany in the village during World War II.
