= Bonarówka =

- Village
- Orthodox church of the Pokrov in Bonarówka

- Location within Poland
- Coordinates: 49°49′N 21°48′E
- Country: Poland
- Voivodeship: Subcarpathian
- County: Strzyżów
- Gmina: Strzyżów

Bonarówka (Polish pronunciation: [bɔnaˈrufka]; Ukrainian: Бонарівка) is a village in the administrative district of Gmina Strzyżów, within Strzyżów County, Subcarpathian Voivodeship, in south-eastern Poland.

== History ==
Historically, Bonarówka was inhabited primarily by the Zamishantsi, a distinct Ukrainian ethnographic group residing in a linguistic and cultural enclave surrounded by Polish-speaking settlements in the Subcarpathian region..

During the Austrian and Austro-Hungarian periods, the village was part of the Kingdom of Galicia and Lodomeria. Following World War II and the Polish–Soviet border agreement of August 1945, the Ukrainian population of Bonarówka was subjected to the population exchange between Poland and Soviet Ukraine in 1945–1946, during which most residents were resettled to the Ukrainian Soviet Socialist Republic (particularly to the Stanislaviv Oblast, including Sniatyn and surrounding villages). Any remaining Ukrainian residents were subsequently displaced during Operation Vistula in 1947.

== Landmarks ==
- Church of the Protection of the Blessed Virgin Mary — a historic wooden church built in 1841 (with a 17th-century tower) originally as a Greek Catholic parish church; following the post-war deportations, it was converted into a Roman Catholic church.
