= Zakerzonia =

Region of Poland

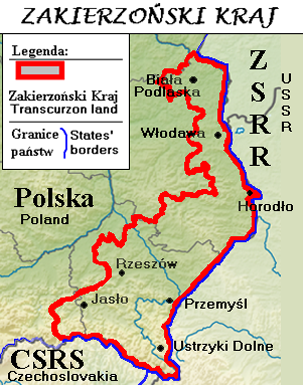
Zakerzonia

Zakerzonia (Ukrainian: Закерзоння, romanized: Zakerzonnia, lit. 'Trans-Curzonia'; Polish: Zakerzonie) is an informal name for the territories of Poland to the west of the Curzon Line which used to have sizeable Ukrainian (old name: Rusyn/Ruthenian) populations, including significant Lemko, Boyko populations, before the invasion of Poland by the Soviet Union and Nazi Germany in 1939, and were claimed as ethnically Ukrainian territories by Ukrainian nationalists in the aftermath of World War II. However, before 1939, the areas of Zakerzonia were mostly inhabited by Poles, who constituted about 70% of the population of this area. Ukrainians lived in a minority in Zakerzonia, constituting about 20% of the area's population.

"Zakerzonia" stands for "territory beyond the Curzon line", or in Ukrainian "Zakerzons'kyi krai".

The Ukrainian Insurgent Army (UPA), at the height of their control of the territories, claimed plans of creation of Transcurzon Republic.

The demography of Zakerzonia drastically changed by forcible resettlement of the Ukrainians, with ethnic cleansing operations being the resettlement of Ukrainians from Poland to the Soviet Union (1944–1946) and Operation Vistula (1947). Therefore, Poles today constitute over 95% of the population of Zakerzonia.

== Ukrainians in Zakerzonia in the 1931 census ==
The last census before World War II carried out in Zakerzonia was the Polish census of 1931.

The results of the 1931 census (questions about mother tongue and religion) in three voivodeships encompassing Zakerzonia:

Ukrainian/Ruthenian (language) and Greek Catholic/Orthodox (religion) majority minority counties are highlighted with yellow.

Ukrainian and Polish population in voivodeships encompassing Zakerzonia according to the 1931 census
Today part of	County part of Voivodeship	County	Pop.	Ukrainian & Ruthenian	%	Polish	%	Uniate & Orthodox	%	Roman Catholic	%
(Ukraine)	Lwów	Bibrka	97124	60444	62.2%	30762	31.7%	66113	68.1%	22820	23.5%
(Ukraine)	Lwów	Drohobych	194456	79214	40.7%	91935	47.3%	110850	57.0%	52172	26.8%
(Ukraine)	Lwów	Horodok	85007	47812	56.2%	33228	39.1%	56713	66.7%	22408	26.4%
(Ukraine)	Lwów	Lviv City	312231	35137	11.3%	198212	63.5%	50824	16.3%	157490	50.4%
(Ukraine)	Lwów	Lviv County	142800	58395	40.9%	80712	56.5%	67592	47.3%	67430	47.2%
(Ukraine)	Lwów	Rudky	79170	36254	45.8%	38417	48.5%	45756	57.8%	27674	35.0%
(Ukraine)	Lwów	Sambir	133814	68222	51.0%	56818	42.5%	78527	58.7%	43583	32.6%
(Ukraine)	Lwów	Zhovkva	95507	56060	58.7%	35816	37.5%	66823	70.0%	20279	21.2%
Total in counties of Lwów Voivodeship which are today entirely in Ukraine			1140109	441538	38.7%	565900	49.6%	543198	47.6%	413856	36.3%
(Ukraine) (Poland)	Lwów	Dobromyl	93970	52463	55.8%	35945	38.3%	59664	63.5%	25941	27.6%
(Ukraine) (Poland)	Lwów	Yavoriv	86762	55868	64.4%	26938	31.0%	62828	72.4%	18394	21.2%
(Ukraine) (Poland)	Lwów	Mostyska	89460	37196	41.6%	49989	55.9%	49230	55.0%	34619	38.7%
(Ukraine) (Poland)	Lwów	Rava-Ruska	122072	82133	67.3%	27376	22.4%	84808	69.5%	22489	18.4%
(Ukraine) (Poland)	Lwów	Sokal	109111	59984	55.0%	42851	39.3%	69963	64.1%	25425	23.3%
(Ukraine) (Poland)	Lwów	Turka	114457	80483	70.3%	26083	22.8%	97339	85.0%	6301	5.5%
Total in counties of Lwów Voivodeship today split between Ukraine and Poland			615832	368127	59.8%	209182	34.0%	423832	68.8%	133169	21.6%
(Poland)	Lwów	Brzozów	83205	10677	12.8%	68149	81.9%	12743	15.3%	65813	79.1%
(Poland)	Lwów	Jarosław	148028	20993	14.2%	120429	81.4%	52302	35.3%	83652	56.5%
(Poland)	Lwów	Kolbuszowa	69565	62	0.1%	65361	94.0%	91	0.1%	63999	92.0%
(Poland)	Lwów	Krosno	113387	14666	12.9%	93691	82.6%	15132	13.3%	91189	80.4%
(Poland)	Lwów	Lesko	111575	70346	63.0%	31840	28.5%	81588	73.1%	18209	16.3%
(Poland)	Lwów	Lubaczów	87266	38237	43.8%	43294	49.6%	44723	51.2%	32994	37.8%
(Poland)	Lwów	Łańcut	97679	2690	2.8%	92084	94.3%	4806	4.9%	86066	88.1%
(Poland)	Lwów	Nisko	64233	115	0.2%	60602	94.3%	925	1.4%	59069	92.0%
(Poland)	Lwów	Przemyśl	162544	60005	36.9%	86393	53.2%	73631	45.3%	67068	41.3%
(Poland)	Lwów	Przeworsk	61388	406	0.7%	58634	95.5%	3042	5.0%	54833	89.3%
(Poland)	Lwów	Rzeszów	185106	963	0.5%	173897	93.9%	3277	1.8%	164050	88.6%
(Poland)	Lwów	Sanok	114195	38192	33.4%	67955	59.5%	54882	48.1%	48968	42.9%
(Poland)	Lwów	Tarnobrzeg	73297	93	0.1%	67624	92.3%	194	0.3%	65891	89.9%
Total in counties of Lwów Voivodeship which are today entirely in Poland			1371468	257445	18.8%	1029953	75.1%	347336	25.3%	901801	65.8%
Total in Lwów Voivodeship			3127409	1067110	34.1%	1805035	57.7%	1314366	42.0%	1448826	46.3%
(Poland)	Kraków	Biała	139127	48	0.0%	127089	91.3%	197	0.1%	126431	90.9%
(Poland)	Kraków	Bochnia	113790	75	0.1%	109717	96.4%	134	0.1%	107399	94.4%
(Poland)	Kraków	Brzesko	102226	20	0.0%	100251	98.1%	66	0.1%	97730	95.6%
(Poland)	Kraków	Chrzanów	138061	88	0.1%	127078	92.0%	240	0.2%	125016	90.6%
(Poland)	Kraków	Dąbrowa	66678	25	0.0%	62620	93.9%	36	0.1%	61584	92.4%
(Poland)	Kraków	Gorlice	104805	24881	23.7%	76266	72.8%	25092	23.9%	73788	70.4%
(Poland)	Kraków	Jasło	116146	7435	6.4%	103935	89.5%	7659	6.6%	102213	88.0%
(Poland)	Kraków	Kraków City	219286	924	0.4%	171206	78.1%	1894	0.9%	159372	72.7%
(Poland)	Kraków	Kraków County	187509	97	0.1%	185567	99.0%	309	0.2%	181836	97.0%
(Poland)	Kraków	Limanowa	87279	29	0.0%	85238	97.7%	43	0.0%	84048	96.3%
(Poland)	Kraków	Mielec	77465	48	0.1%	71272	92.0%	72	0.1%	69737	90.0%
(Poland)	Kraków	Myślenice	102692	16	0.0%	101878	99.2%	32	0.0%	99978	97.4%
(Poland)	Kraków	Nowy Sącz	183867	24252	13.2%	148329	80.7%	25060	13.6%	141857	77.2%
(Poland)	Kraków	Nowy Targ	129489	2156	1.7%	123877	95.7%	2296	1.8%	121767	94.0%
(Poland)	Kraków	Ropczyce	110925	60	0.1%	105700	95.3%	136	0.1%	104033	93.8%
(Poland)	Kraków	Tarnów	142365	102	0.1%	124817	87.7%	293	0.2%	120610	84.7%
(Poland)	Kraków	Wadowice	145143	53	0.0%	142852	98.4%	125	0.1%	140469	96.8%
(Poland)	Kraków	Żywiec	130949	19	0.0%	129747	99.1%	71	0.1%	127685	97.5%
Total in Kraków Voivodeship			2297802	60328	2.6%	2097439	91.3%	63755	2.8%	2045553	89.0%
(Poland)	Lublin	Biała Podlaska	116266	2250	1.9%	106467	91.6%	18715	16.1%	82647	71.1%
(Poland)	Lublin	Biłgoraj	116951	2727	2.3%	106100	90.7%	21055	18.0%	82614	70.6%
(Poland)	Lublin	Chełm	162340	13103	8.1%	120805	74.4%	37875	23.3%	88488	54.5%
(Poland)	Lublin	Garwolin	159942	68	0.0%	140024	87.5%	147	0.1%	139128	87.0%
(Poland)	Lublin	Hrubieszów	129957	19066	14.7%	101394	78.0%	49802	38.3%	63365	48.8%
(Poland)	Lublin	Janów	152718	1009	0.7%	142113	93.1%	1206	0.8%	135182	88.5%
(Poland)	Lublin	Krasnystaw	134159	1054	0.8%	123204	91.8%	4886	3.6%	113442	84.6%
(Poland)	Lublin	Lubartów	107991	628	0.6%	99918	92.5%	1583	1.5%	94356	87.4%
(Poland)	Lublin	Lublin City	112285	227	0.2%	73534	65.5%	863	0.8%	71542	63.7%
(Poland)	Lublin	Lublin County	163502	57	0.0%	151946	92.9%	186	0.1%	149192	91.2%
(Poland)	Lublin	Łuków	129083	28	0.0%	120991	93.7%	118	0.1%	113549	88.0%
(Poland)	Lublin	Puławy	172267	133	0.1%	150022	87.1%	308	0.2%	149060	86.5%
(Poland)	Lublin	Radzyń	99089	326	0.3%	84174	84.9%	1874	1.9%	80520	81.3%
(Poland)	Lublin	Siedlce	151411	132	0.1%	129414	85.5%	709	0.5%	125018	82.6%
(Poland)	Lublin	Sokołów	83949	39	0.0%	75376	89.8%	176	0.2%	74941	89.3%
(Poland)	Lublin	Tomaszów	121124	20752	17.1%	86612	71.5%	33642	27.8%	73021	60.3%
(Poland)	Lublin	Węgrów	88788	34	0.0%	79709	89.8%	83	0.1%	76511	86.2%
(Poland)	Lublin	Włodawa	113566	9663	8.5%	86866	76.5%	33585	29.6%	57939	51.0%
(Poland)	Lublin	Zamość	149548	2532	1.7%	130530	87.3%	6942	4.6%	125249	83.8%
Total in Lublin Voivodeship			2464936	73828	3.0%	2109199	85.6%	213755	8.7%	1895764	76.9%

In total within Zakerzonia (area which today belongs to Poland) in these three pre-war voivodeships there were in 1931 almost 392,000 people with Ukrainian or Ruthenian mother tongue and about 625,000 people whose religion was either Orthodox or Uniate (Greek Catholic). This does not include some parts of Sokal, Rava-Ruska, Yavoriv, Mostyska, Dobromyl and Turka counties which remained in Poland. Perhaps 1/3 of the population of these counties remained in Poland, which would give an additional almost 123,000 Ukrainian/Ruthenian-speakers and 141,000 Uniate/Orthodox people.

== Ukrainians in Poland: 1939–1950 ==
Piotr Eberhardt estimates that in 1939 the number of Ukrainians between the Curzon Line and Oder–Neisse line was 657,500 people.

Timothy Snyder gives a similar estimate of up to 700,000 Ukrainians or Ukrainian-language speakers living in Poland within its new borders immediately after World War II. They were a "demographic majority in many areas along a long border strip running from Chełm almost to Kraków".

In 1946, only 220,200 Ukrainians were left in Poland, and the figure had further decreased to 150,000 by 1950.
