= Population exchange between Poland and Soviet Ukraine =

1940s population resettlements

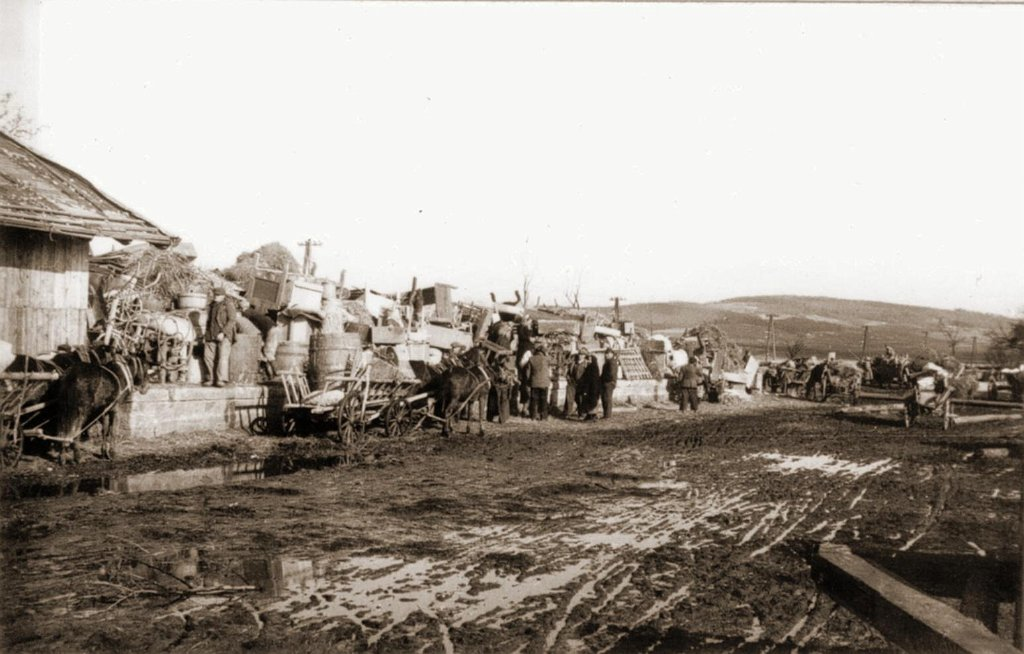
Resettlement of Ukrainians from Nowosielce in Sanok County, March 1946

The population exchange between Poland and Soviet Ukraine at the end of World War II was based on a treaty signed on 9 September 1944 by the Ukrainian SSR with the newly-formed Polish Committee of National Liberation (PKWN). The exchange stipulated the transfer of ethnic Ukrainians who had Polish citizenship before September 17, 1939 to the Ukrainian SSR and of ethnic Poles and Jews who had Polish citizenship before September 17, 1939 (date of the Soviet Invasion of Poland) to post-war Poland, in accordance with the resolutions of the Yalta and Tehran conferences and the plans about the new Poland–Ukraine border. Similar agreements were signed with the Byelorussian SSR (see Population exchange between Poland and Soviet Belarus) and the Lithuanian SSR (see Population exchange between Poland and Soviet Lithuania); the three documents are commonly known as the Republican Agreements.

== History ==
The population transfer, which took place in 1944 to 1946, became part of a mass movement of people expelled from their homes in the process of ethnic consolidation throughout nations of Central and Eastern Europe.

The new border between post-war Poland and the Soviet Union along the Curzon Line, as requested by Soviet Premier Josef Stalin at the Yalta Conference with the Western Allies, had been ratified. There was an ensuing population exchange that affected close to half a million ethnic Ukrainians and about 1.1 million Poles and Polish Jews.

The eastern and central areas of the Soviet republics remained unchanged, but the western regions of the Ukrainian and the Byelorussian SSR underwent dramatic expansion at the expense of the Second Polish Republic. The so-called repatriation pertained to rural populations as much as the inhabitants of provincial capitals and stripped them of their prewar economic catchment areas (Grodno, Brest, Lviv, Przemyśl). About 480,000 people from Zakerzonia, west of the Curzon Line, were moved eastward to the territory, which became part of Soviet Ukraine and Belarus.

With the signing of the agreement in September 1944, people who were required to register for resettlement were identified only by ethnicity, not by the country of birth. Ukrainians residing west of the border were required to register with the Polish authorities, and the Poles living east of the border registered with the Soviet NKVD. To guarantee efficiency and prevent the haulage of empty wagons, the resettled people were loaded onto the same returning trains on both sides of the new border. According to statistical data, rural inhabitants (453,766 people) represented 58% of all relocated Poles, while urban residents (328,908 people) accounted for the remaining percentage.

The number of Ukrainians registered between October 1944 and September 1946 was 492,682. Of the total, 482,880 individuals were eventually relocated to Soviet Ukraine, settling primarily in the Ternopil, Ivano-Frankivsk, and Lviv Oblasts (provinces), in the southern and south-western oblasts of Mykolaiv and Dnipropetrovsk, and to a lesser extent the Donbas region of eastern Ukraine. The largest resettlement of Ukrainians from Poland took place in the border counties of Hrubieszów, Przemyśl and Sanok, followed by Lubaczów, Tomaszów, Lesko, Jarosław and Chełm.

== Logistics ==
During the resettlement campaign, all eligible individuals were required to register with local Polish district commissions set up in the key cities of Jarosław, Gorlice, Krasnystaw, Chełm, Lublin, Biłgoraj, Jasło, Zamość and Nowy Sącz. The function of the commissions, which were staffed with both Polish communists and Soviet personnel, was not only to register, coordinate and facilitate the transportation of individuals, but also to conduct propaganda work among the target population. Because of the propaganda, which falsely promised Ukrainians better living conditions in Soviet Ukraine, there was some initial success. However, the number of applications for resettlement tapered off by mid-1945, as word spread concerning the true conditions of the agreement, and by the fact that the Ukrainians were not permitted to leave Soviet Ukraine.

In August 1945, the campaign to resettle entered a new phase. To achieve the political objective of relocating the Ukrainian ethnic population from Poland, the Polish government abandoned the relatively-benign character of the policy toward a more aggressive approach. There was significant resistance, as most Ukrainians did not want to abandon their ancestral lands and resettle to Soviet Ukraine. In that regard, Polish and Soviet security forces were deployed (KBW and MVD, respectively) to force people to relocate. With time, the pretence of "voluntary resettlement" was dropped. Groups and entire villages were forced out of their homes and directed to embark on transports bound for the Soviet Union. Within the course of a single year, July 1945–July 1946, close to 500,000 Ukrainians and Rusyns had been uprooted and deported in that manner. The resettlement operation concluded in September 1946.

The campaign to resettle Ukrainians was in large part intended to remove any base for the Ukrainian Insurgent Army (UPA), which had conducted the massacres of Poles in Volhynia and Eastern Galicia since 1943. The UPA was somewhat successful in disrupting the 1944–1946 transfers. Difficulties in suppressing the UPA insurgency, however, prompted the Polish and Soviet communist governments to pursue Operation Vistula in 1947, which entailed the resettlement of the Ukrainians remaining in southeastern Poland into the Recovered Territories. Orest Subtelny, a Canadian historian of Ukrainian descent, concluded "that the separation of the two people was a necessary precondition for the development of a mutually beneficial relationship between them. Apparently, the old adage that 'good fences make for good neighbors' has been proven once more," he wrote.

== Notable persons ==
- Stanisław Lem, Polish science fiction writer and his family; resettled from Lwów (now Lviv) to Kraków
- Kazimierz Górski, Polish football coach.
- Stefan Żywotko, Polish football coach.

== See also ==
- History of the Ukrainian minority in Poland
- Massacres of Poles in Volhynia and Eastern Galicia
- Ukrainian minority in Poland
- World War II evacuation and expulsion
