= Bobrek, Podkarpackie Voivodeship =

Bobrek
- Village
- Location within Poland
- Coordinates: 50°01′48″N 21°30′0″E
- Country: Poland
- Voivodeship: Subcarpathian
- County: Dębica
- Gmina: Dębica

Bobrek is a village in Subcarpathian Voivodeship, south-east Poland, located between Dębica and Ropczyce, close to Zawada in the district called Gmina Dębica.
