= Igloopol Dębica =

Polish sports club

LKS Igloopol Dębica
- Full name: Ludowy Klub Sportowy Igloopol Dębica
- Nickname: Morsy (The Walruses)
- Founded: 1978; 48 years ago
- Ground: Miejski im. 70-lecia Odzyskania Niepodległości
- Capacity: 700
- Chairman: Piotr Sujdak
- Manager: Michał Szymczak
- League: IV liga Subcarpathia
- 2025–26: IV liga Subcarpathia, 4th of 18
- Website: https://www.igloopol.info
Home colours	Away colours

LKS Igloopol Dębica (Polish pronunciation: [iˈɡlɔpɔl dɛmˈbitsa]) is a Polish sports club from Dębica, Subcarpathian Voivodeship. Their football team currently competes in the IV liga Subcarpathia, the fifth level of the national football league system.

== History ==
LKS Igloopol was formed by the Agro-Industrial Works "Igloopol" in 1978 in Dębica. The club rose through the league pyramid very quickly as the amount of investment in the club increased. The club had its greatest successes in the early 1990s when it played for two seasons (1990–91 and 1991–92) in the top division of Polish football.

== Fans ==
Igloopol have a small but dedicated fan-base, with the fanatics stand typically amassing between 30-250 fans. In the 2005–06 winter break, an ultras group Ultras Morsy '06 dedicated to creating match choreographies was created.

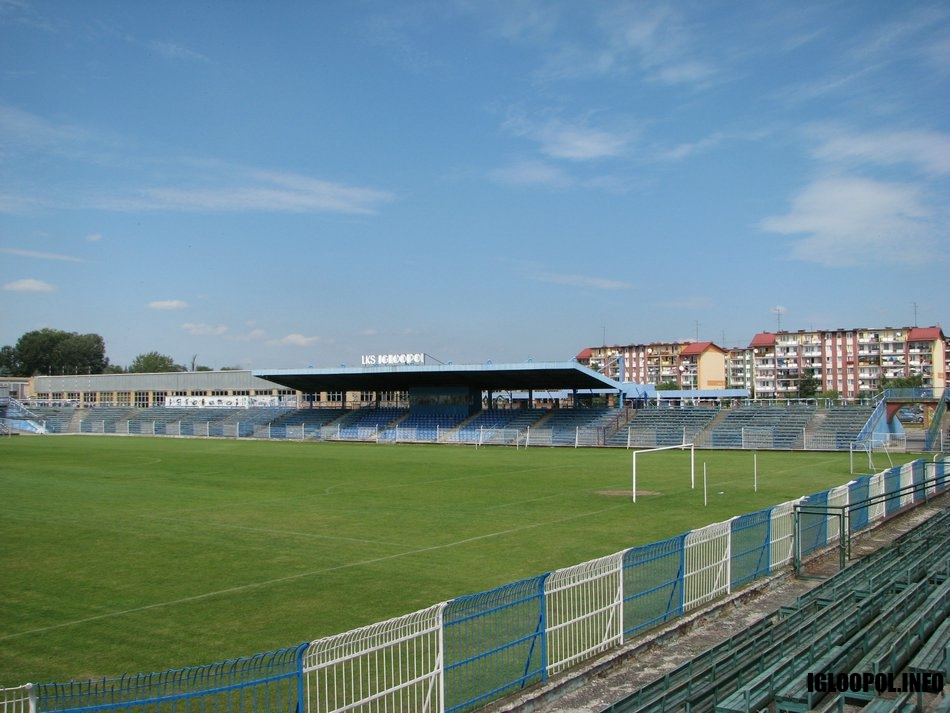
View of Igloopol Dębica's stadium

Apart from in Dębica itself, Igloopol have fans in Pustynia, Kozłów, Kędzierz, Żyraków, Wola Żyrakowska and even in Chicago.

The fans have friendly contacts with fans of Ruch Chorzów, mainly because their local arch-rivals Wisłoka have friendly relations with Górnik Zabrze. Wisłoka Dębica are the club's fiercest rival, and the Dębica derby is one of the most hotly contested derbies in the country. Apart from Wisłoka and Górnik Zabrze, Siarka Tarnobrzeg (who also have good relations with Wisłoka) and Resovia Rzeszów are also considered rivals.

== Honours ==
- Ekstraklasa
  - 12th place: 1990–91
- Polish Cup
  - Quarter-finalists: 1984–85
- Polish Cup (Subcarpathia regionals)
  - Semi-finalists: 2012–13
- Junior Subcarpathian Championship
  - Champions: 2004–05
