= SS-Truppenübungsplatz Heidelager =

Nazi SS military base and concentration camp in Poland

- SS-officer training camp Concentration camp
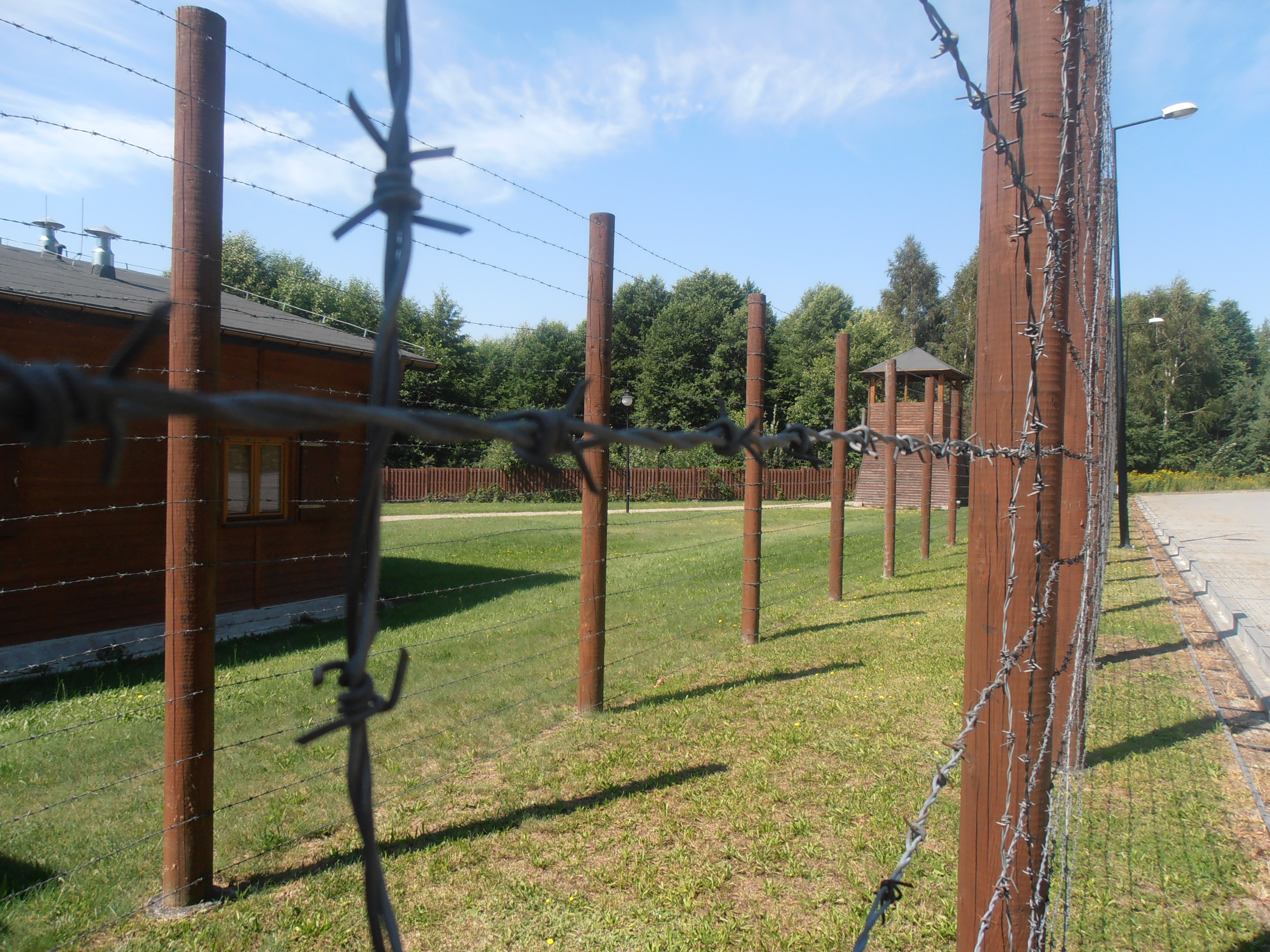
- Heidelager Museum

- Location of Pustków on the map of Poland today
- Coordinates: 50°5′59″N 21°31′8″E
- Operated by: Schutzstaffel (SS)
- Commandant: Oberführer-SS Bernhardt Voss
- Original use: Slave labour, POW internment
- Operational: January 1940 – August 1944
- Inmates: Jews, Poles, Russians
- Killed: 15,000 total: 7,000 Jews, 5,000 Soviets, 3,000 Polish
- Liberated by: Armia Krajowa; Red Army

SS-Truppenübungsplatz Heidelager was a World War II SS military complex and Nazi concentration camp in Pustków and Pustków Osiedle, Occupied Poland. The Nazi facility was built to train collaborationist military units, including the Ukrainian 14th Waffen SS Division "Galician", the Flemish Legion, and the Estonian Legion. This training included killing operations inside the concentration camps – most notably at the nearby Pustków and Szebnie camps – and Jewish ghettos in the vicinity of the 'Heidelager'. The military area was situated in the triangle of the Wisła and San rivers, dominated by large forest areas. The centre of the Heidelager was at Blizna, the location of the secret Nazi V-2 missile launch site, which was built and staffed by prisoners from the concentration camp at Pustków.

== History ==
The Nazis originally planned to erect a large SS training camp near Pustków with barracks, warehouses, and buildings for the intelligence services. The facility was built by order of Reichsführer-SS Heinrich Himmler under provision OKW No. 3032 of 21 December 1939, which allowed for construction of an SS military training centre in the area eastward of Dębica in Generalgouvernement Polen. The training site was to be built as a barrack camp with four ring roads (called: Lager Flandern). It was planned to be completed on 1 October 1940 for two reinforced infantry regiments. To accomplish this, about a dozen villages near Pustków were evacuated and then razed.

In order to provide sufficient labor to build this project, the Nazis initially set up a workers' camp. The camp opened on 26 June 1940 with the arrival the first forced labourers, mostly Jews and Belgian prisoners. Most of the Jewish prisoners were relocated from the Kraków, Rzeszów, and Tarnów ghettos and brought to the camp. The Jewish camp comprised two barracks, which, at the camp's height, were filled with around 465 prisoners. The conditions were so terrible that most prisoners did not survive the first few months. Over its four-year history, the name of the SS military training centre changed several times. During the planning stages, it was named "Ostpolen" (between 21 December 1939 and 26 June 1940.) When construction of the site started on 26 June 1940, it was renamed SS "Dębica". From 15 March 1943, the site was designated as SS "Heidelager". The camp had been in use since the autumn of 1941 under the command of Oberführer-SS Werner von Schele.

The location was expanded into a prisoner of war camp for Red Army soldiers captured in the Soviet zone of occupied Poland after the implementation of Operation Barbarossa. The first of them arrived in October 1941. In the beginning, the POW camp was no more than an enclosed area. The prisoners received minimal or no food, and were reduced to eating grass and roots. There were no barracks, so prisoners had to sleep out in the open. This lack of shelter killed many prisoners during the severe winter of 1941–42. Many were tortured and mistreated, or were executed en masse at the foot of what became known as the Góra Śmierci ('Hill of death'), its real name being Królowa Góra. On this hill the dead inmates were cremated in specially built funeral pyres.

A third camp for Polish forced labourers was established in September 1942. The conditions were no better than those at the first two camps. The forced labourers were involved in the development and production of the V-1 and V-2 rockets in the nearby missile launch site in Blizna. From 1943 the camp was guarded by units of the 204th Schutzmannschafts Battalion, a battalion consisting of ethnic Ukrainians from the area of Lviv. In addition to working on the development of the V-1 and V-2 rockets, the AEG used labor from Jews in the Pustków camp for electrical installations in the Waffen-SS Dębica training areas beginning in 1941.

The total number of victims in the Pustków camp is unknown. In 1944, with the Soviet army advancing, the camp was disbanded. All surviving prisoners were sent to nearby camps, such as the Kraków-Płaszów camp. It is estimated that at least 15,000 people died or were killed, including approximately 5,000 Russian prisoners of war, 7,500 Jews, and 2,500 Poles. The last commandant of the training base was Totenkopfverbände-Oberführer-SS Bernhardt Voss, until the summer of 1944.

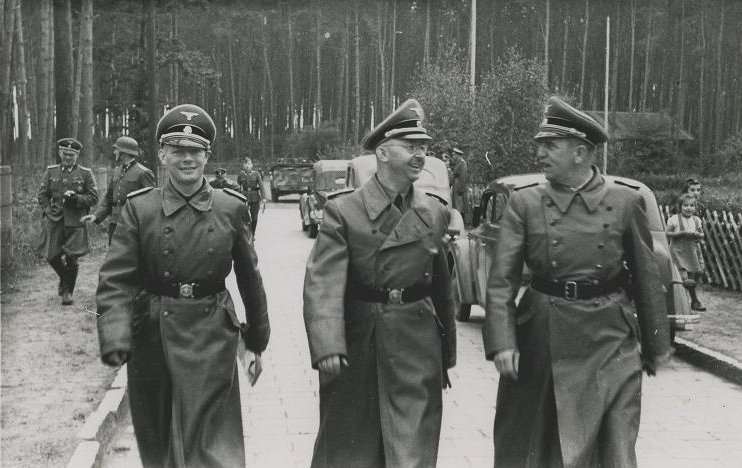
Heinrich Himmler visiting concentration camp SS-Truppenübungsplatz Heidelager with his Nazi entourage, on 28 September 1943

The facility resembled a small city with its own narrow-gauge railway line, some 3,600 men of different nationalities, cinemas, dining halls, dozens of villas, a newsletter, a large camp brothel staffed by female prisoners from the slave labour camp nearby, and regular hunting parties for the high-ranking officers. This is where the Galizien Division came into existence. The range was visited by Reichsführer-SS Heinrich Himmler on 28 September 1943, and abandoned in the summer of 1944 ahead of the Soviet advance during the Lvov-Sandomierz Offensive. The V-2 testing infrastructure was transferred to the Wehrmacht training ground "Heidekraut" (also "Westpreussen", "Gruppe") near Wierzchucin in the Tuchola Forest, according to plans drawn up in the spring of that year, and rocket launching experiments including Rheinbote resumed in the new location by August 1944.

After the camp was abandoned, the area was still defended by a combat group of the Waffen-SS, under the leadership of a SS storm-troopers. The camp was largely destroyed by fire during the evacuation of the military training centre.

Because of the crimes committed on the military training ground, criminal charges were filed by Polish individuals with the Nazi war crimes commission. From 1959 onwards, extensive investigations were made in Germany to uncover the crimes.

== Modern day ==
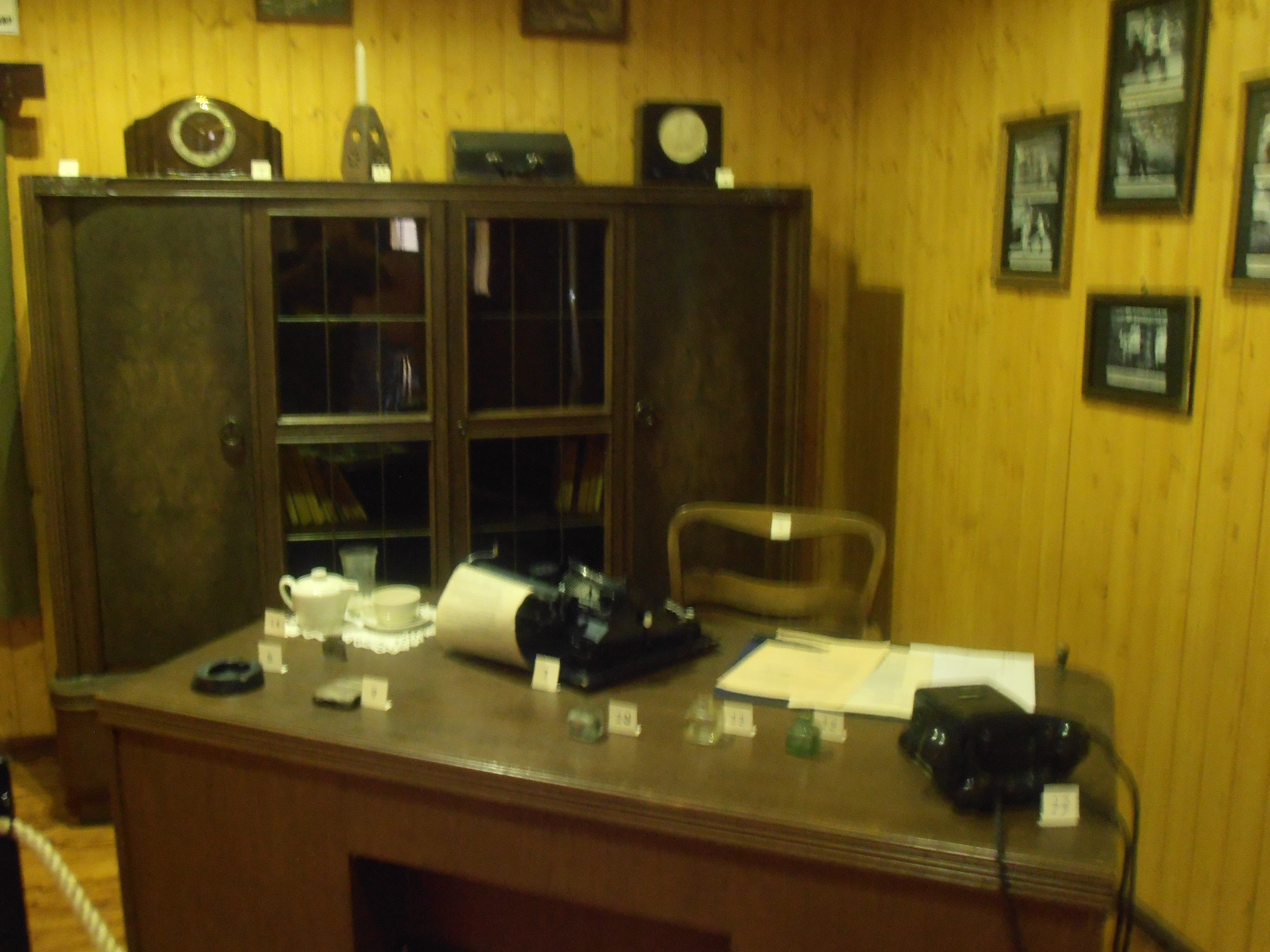
Reconstruction of camp commandant Bernhardt Voss' private office

Today the site houses a reconstruction of huts in the camp. Inside the huts there is a museum, comprising original artefacts from the site, including a reconstruction of the camp commandant Oberführer-SS Bernhardt Voss' private office. There are memorials to the dead and the original crematorium on the adjoining Góra Śmierci.

== See also ==
- SS-Truppenübungsplatz Böhmen
- Truppenübungsplatz Heidekraut
- The Holocaust in Poland
- V-2 missile launch site, Blizna

== Gallery ==
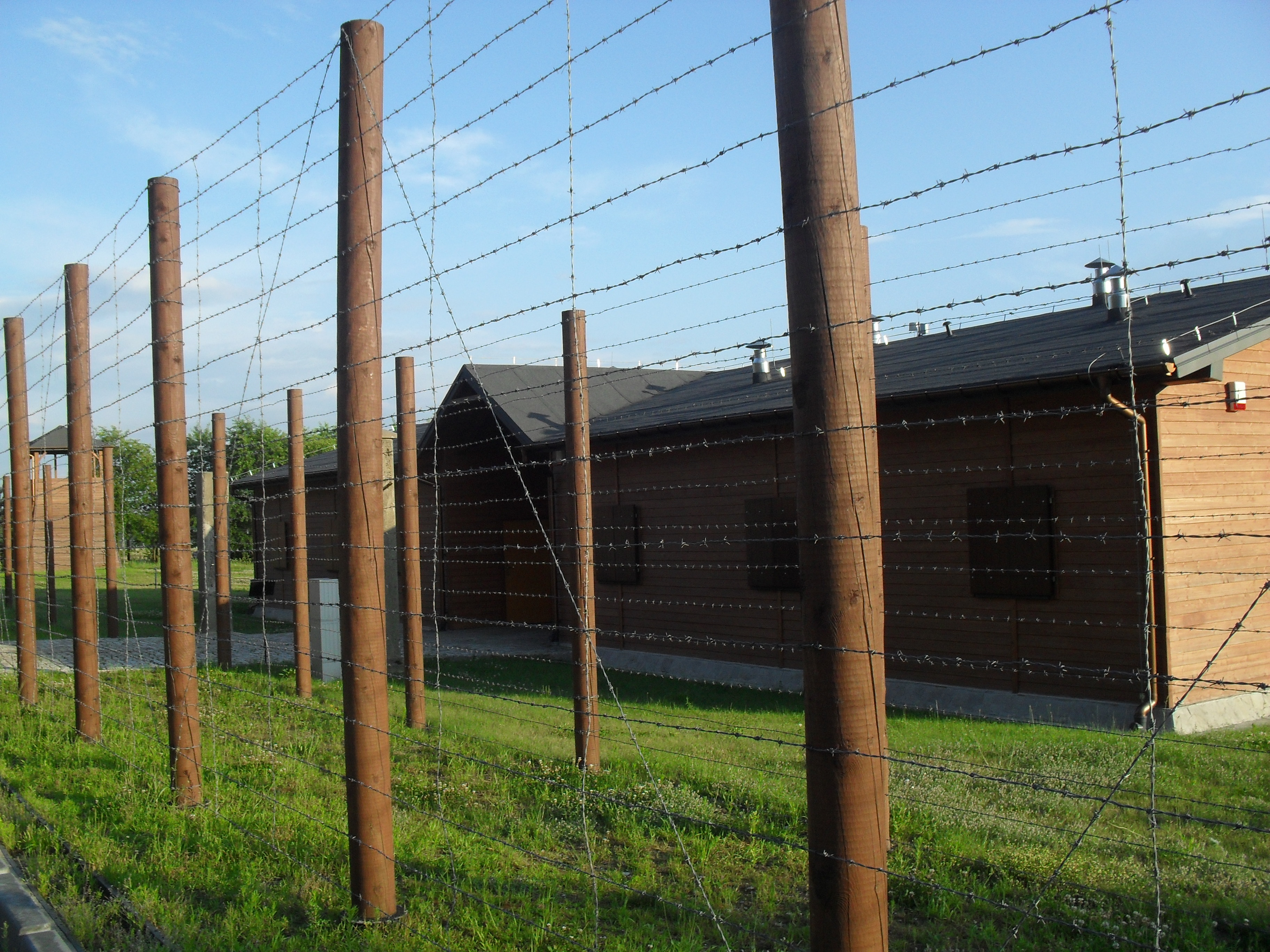
Reconstructed huts

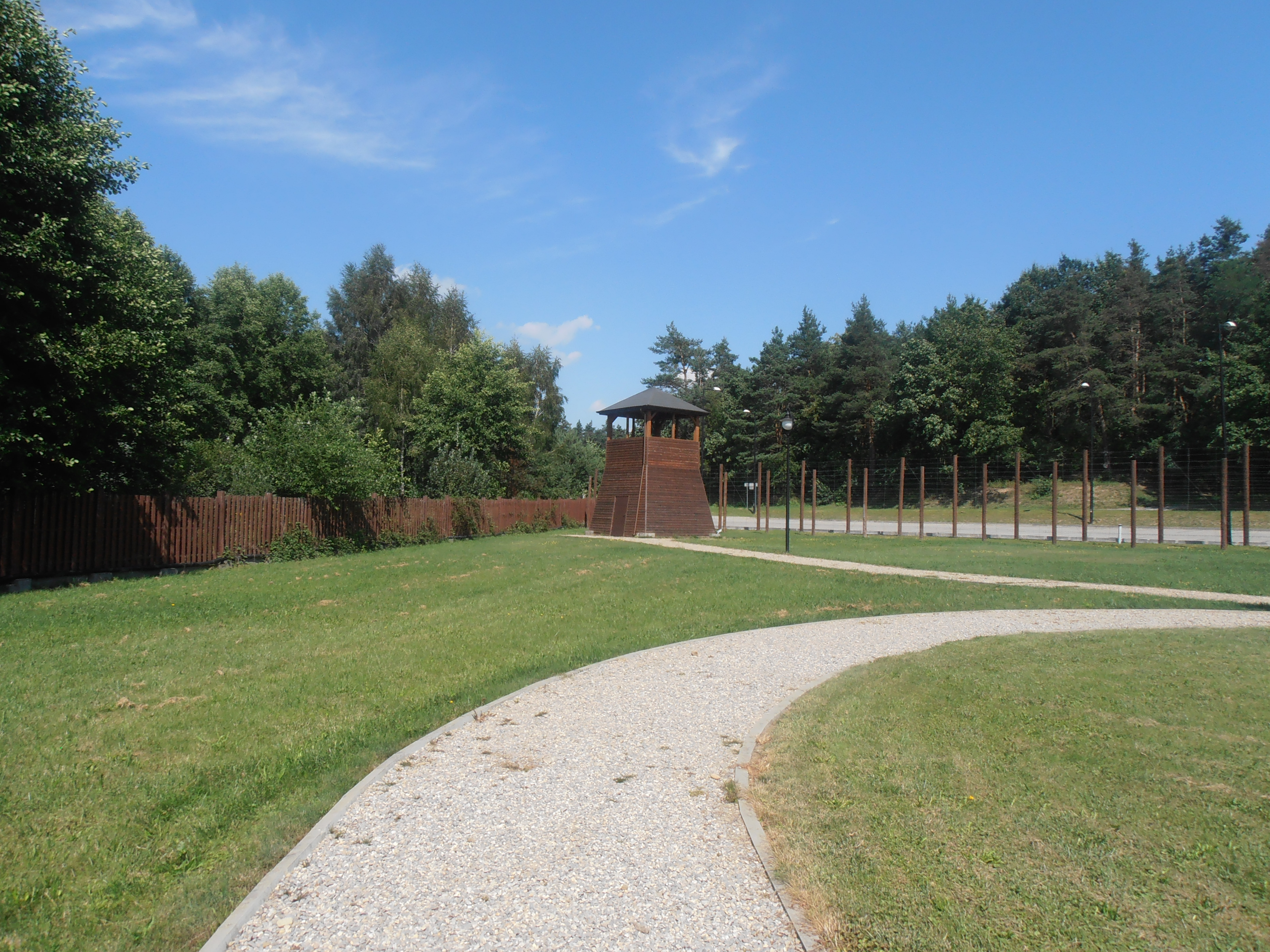
Site of camp

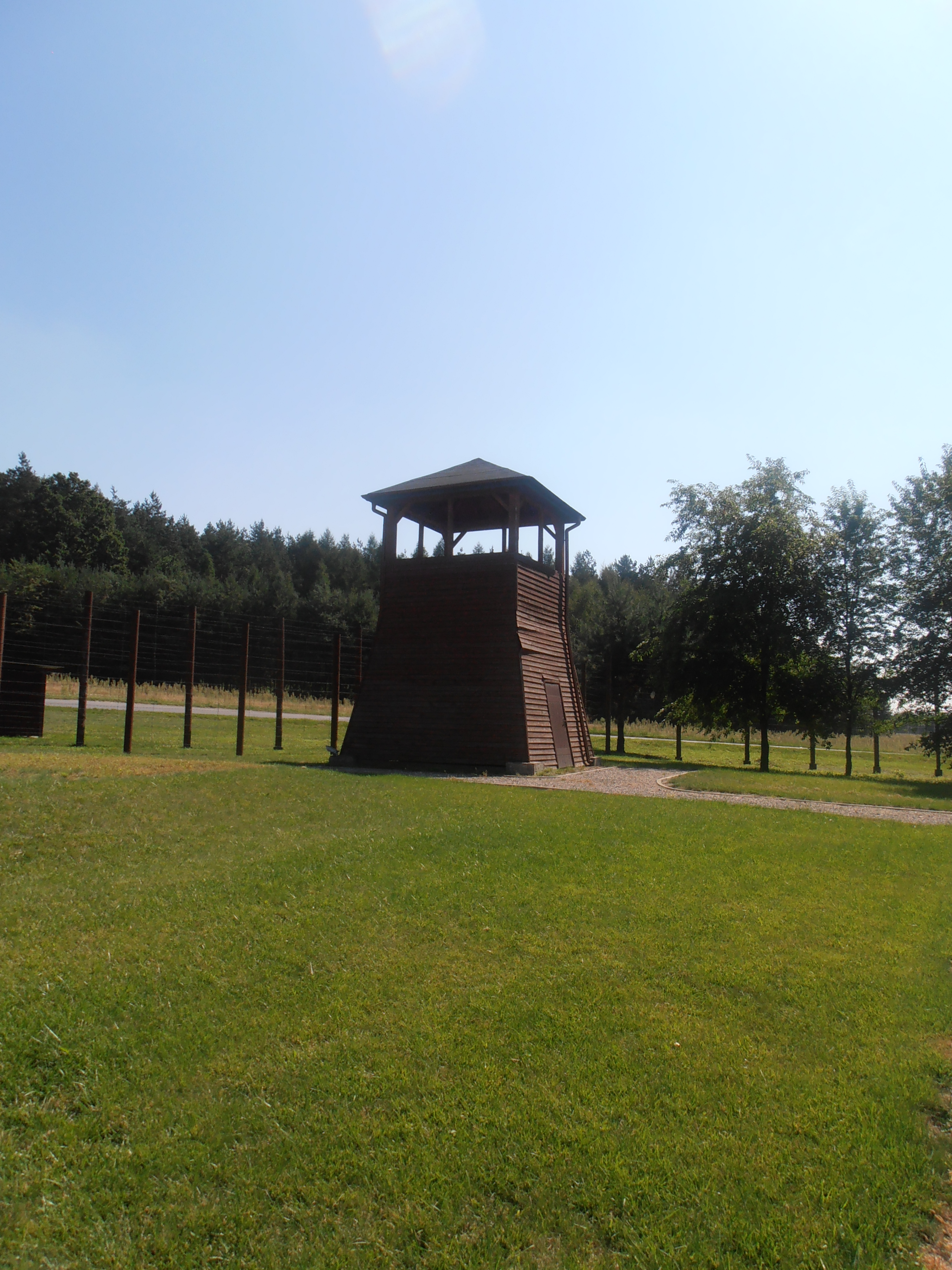
Camp watchtower

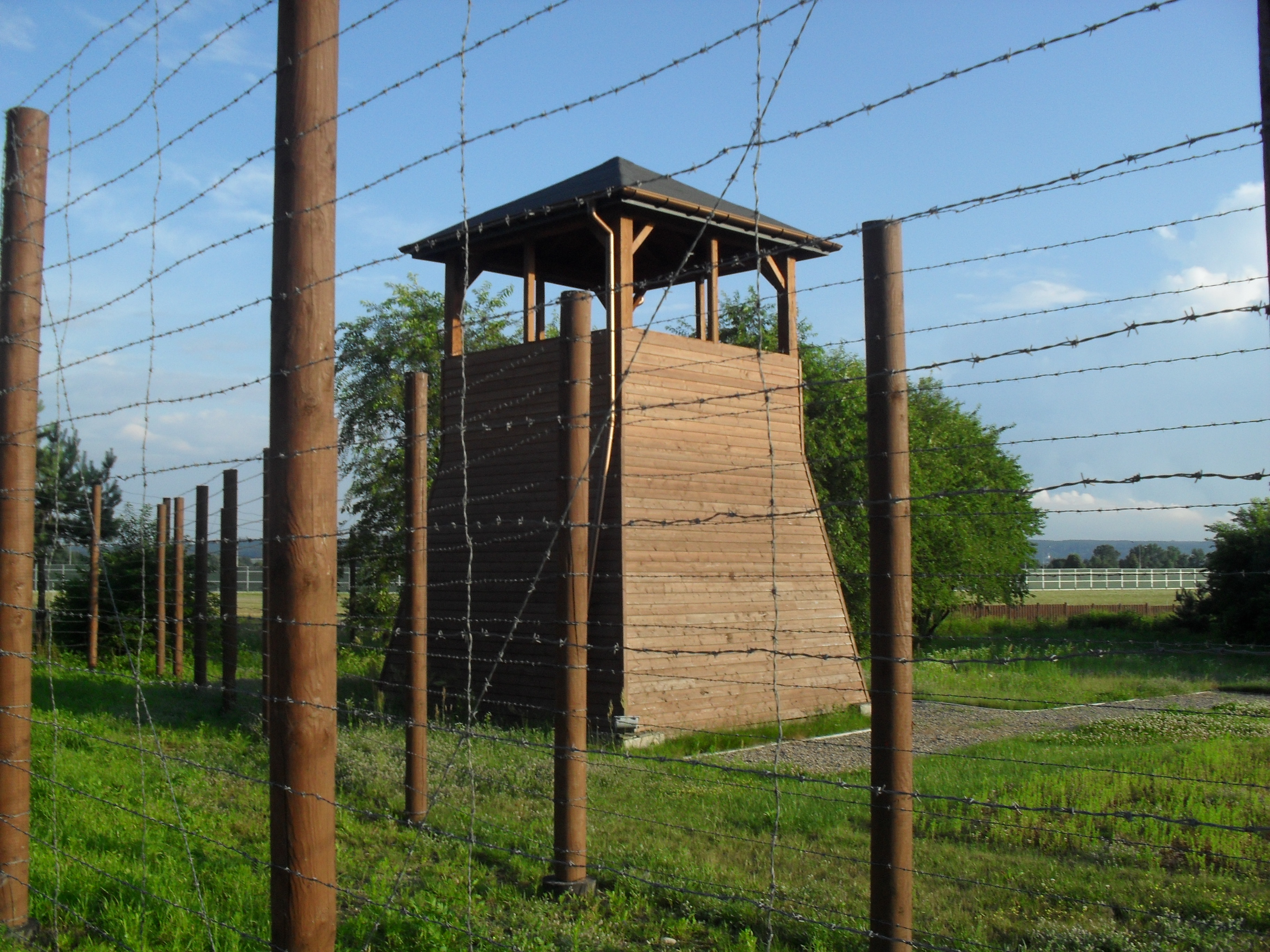
Camp watchtower

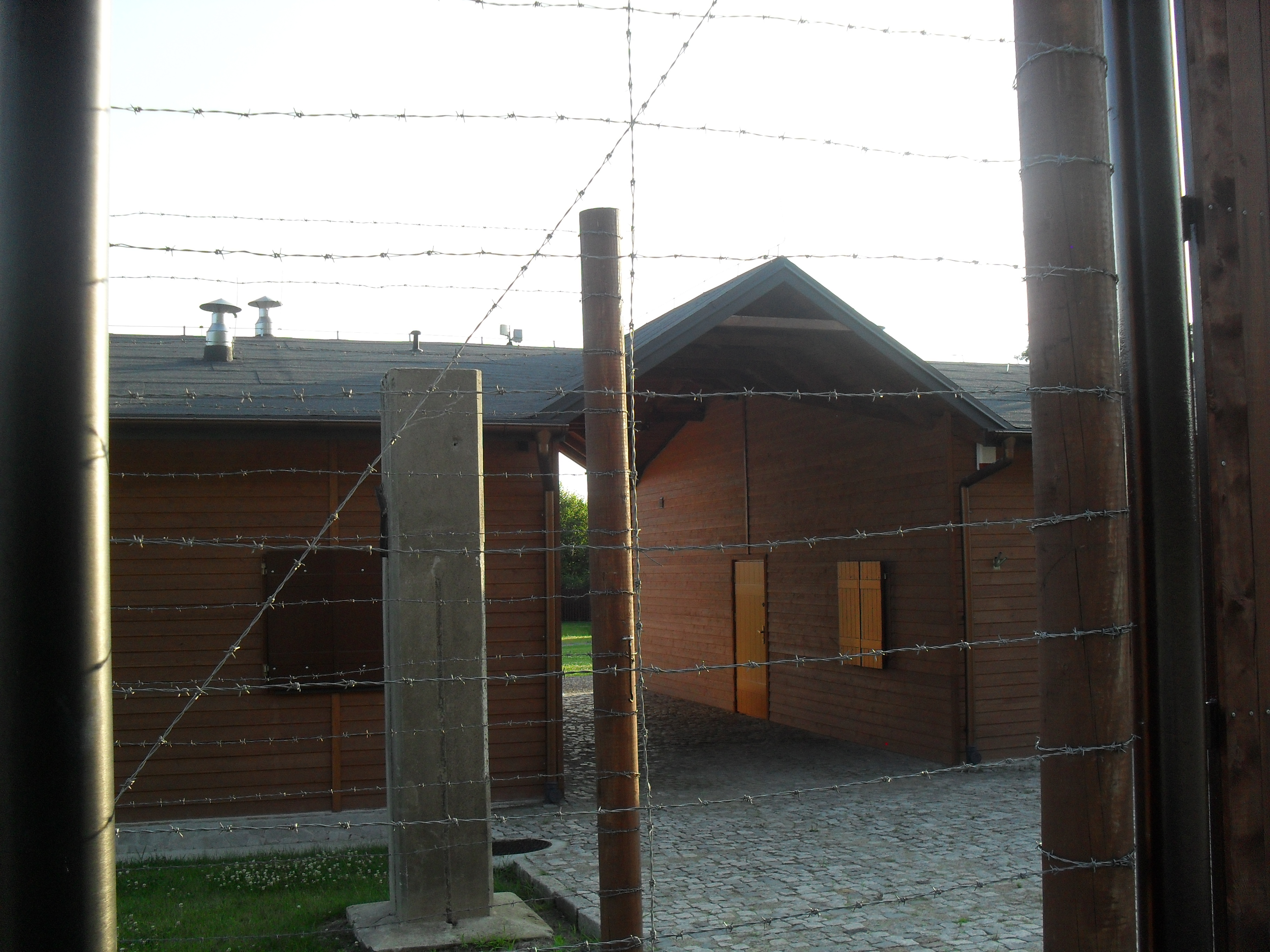
Huts

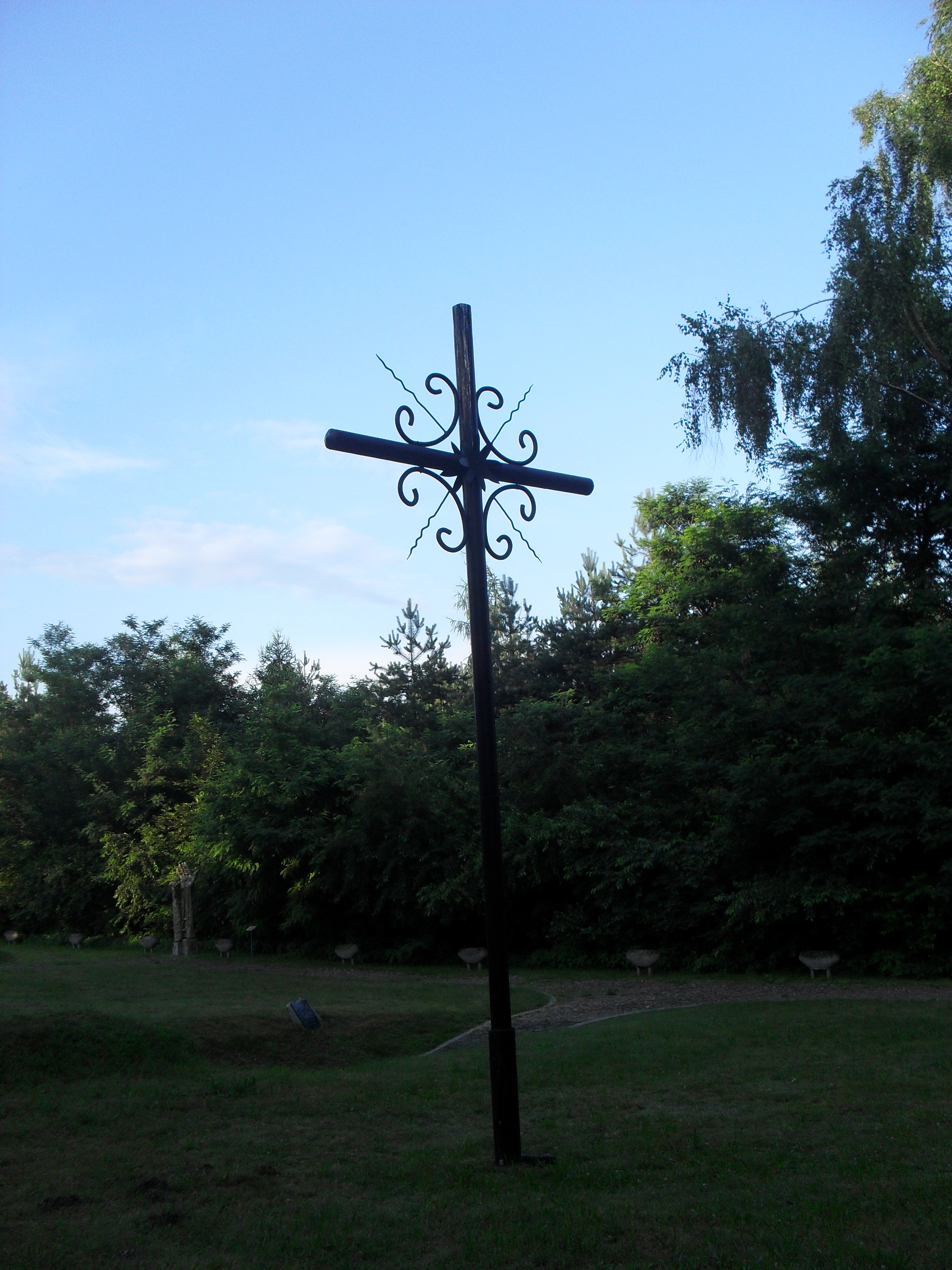
Cross on Góra Śmierci

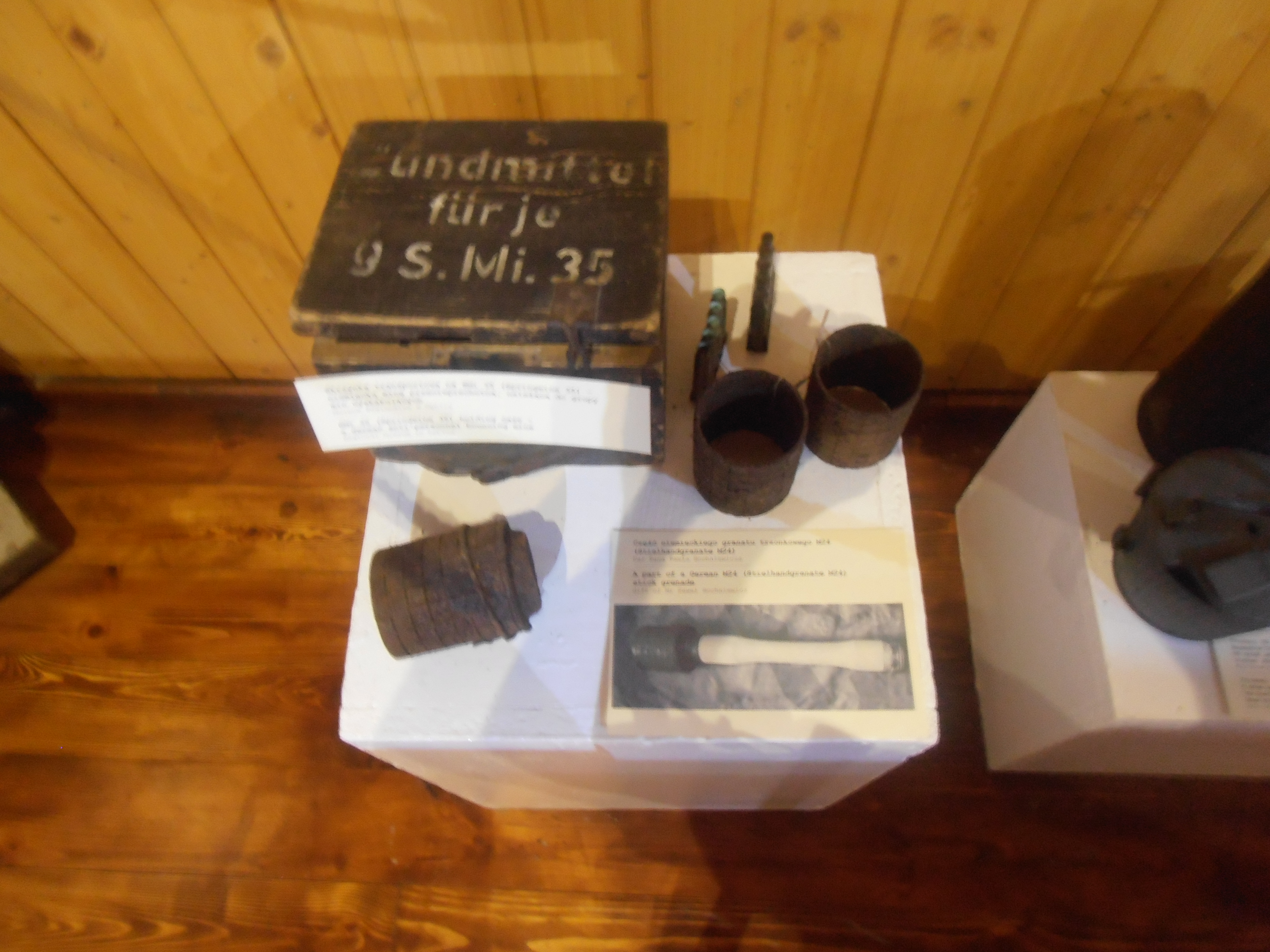
Exhibits in SS-Truppenübungsplatz Heidelager museum

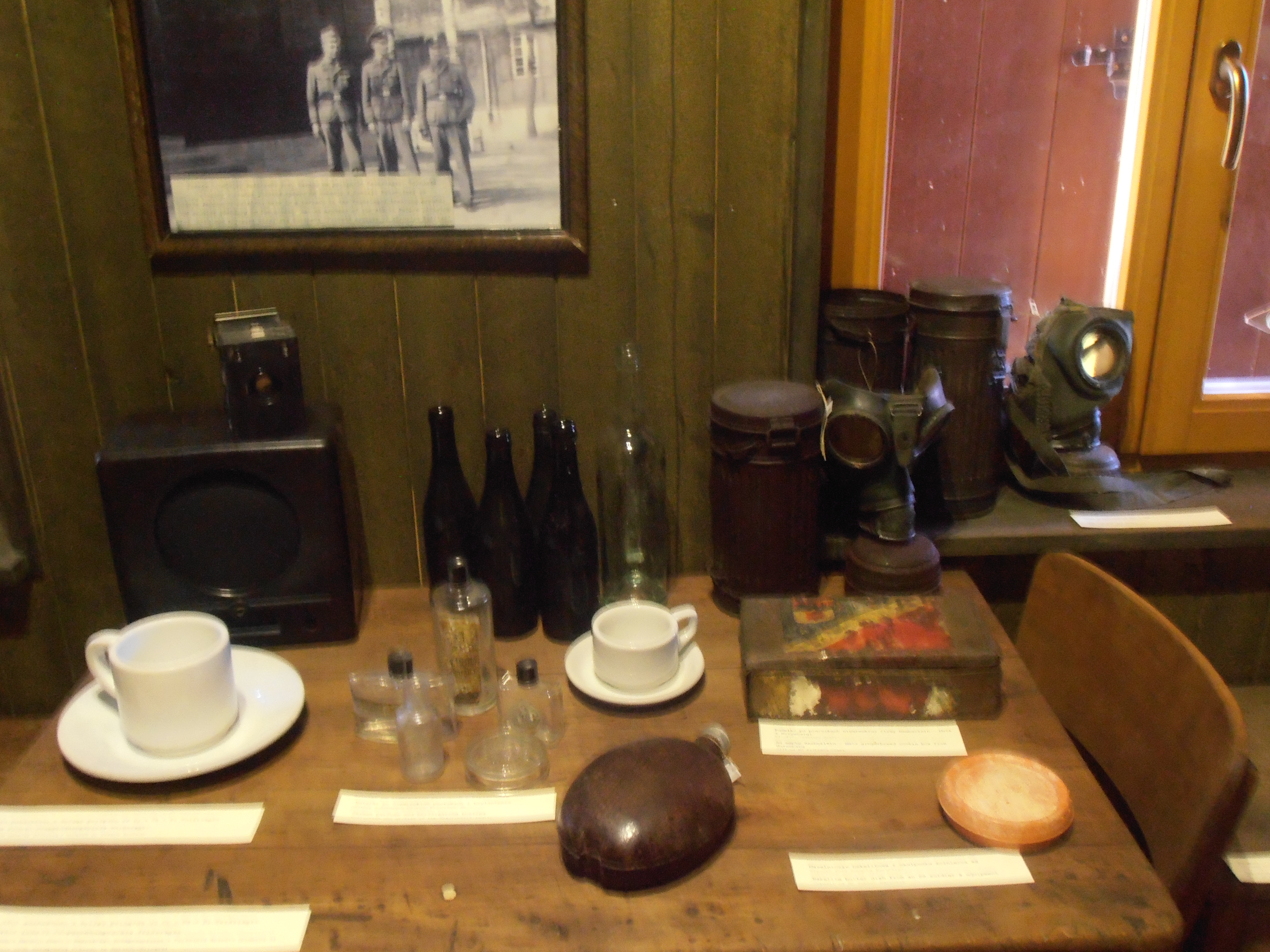
Reconstruction of the camp commandant Bernhardt Voss' private office

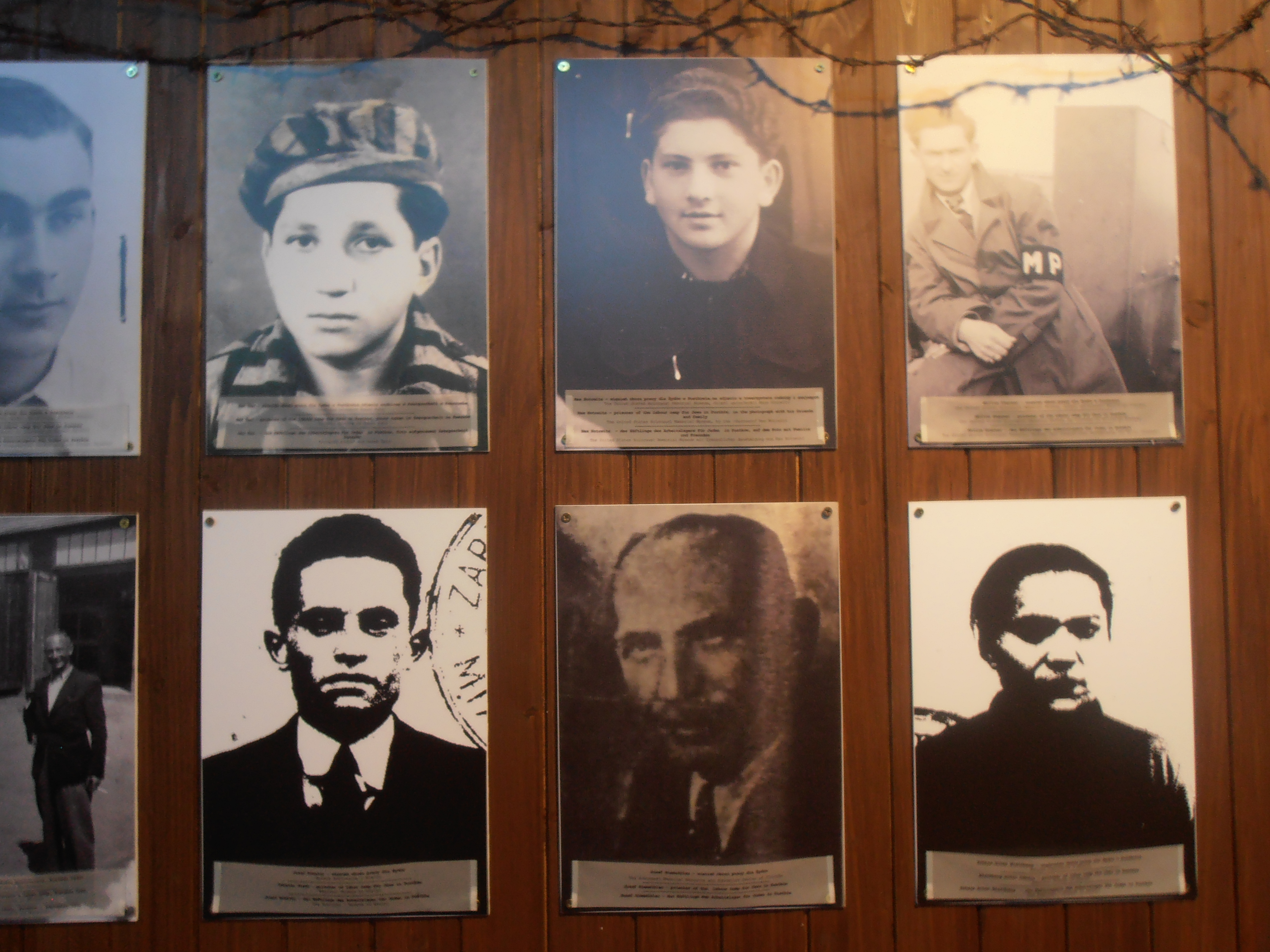
Photographs of prisoners of SS-Truppenübungsplatz Heidelager

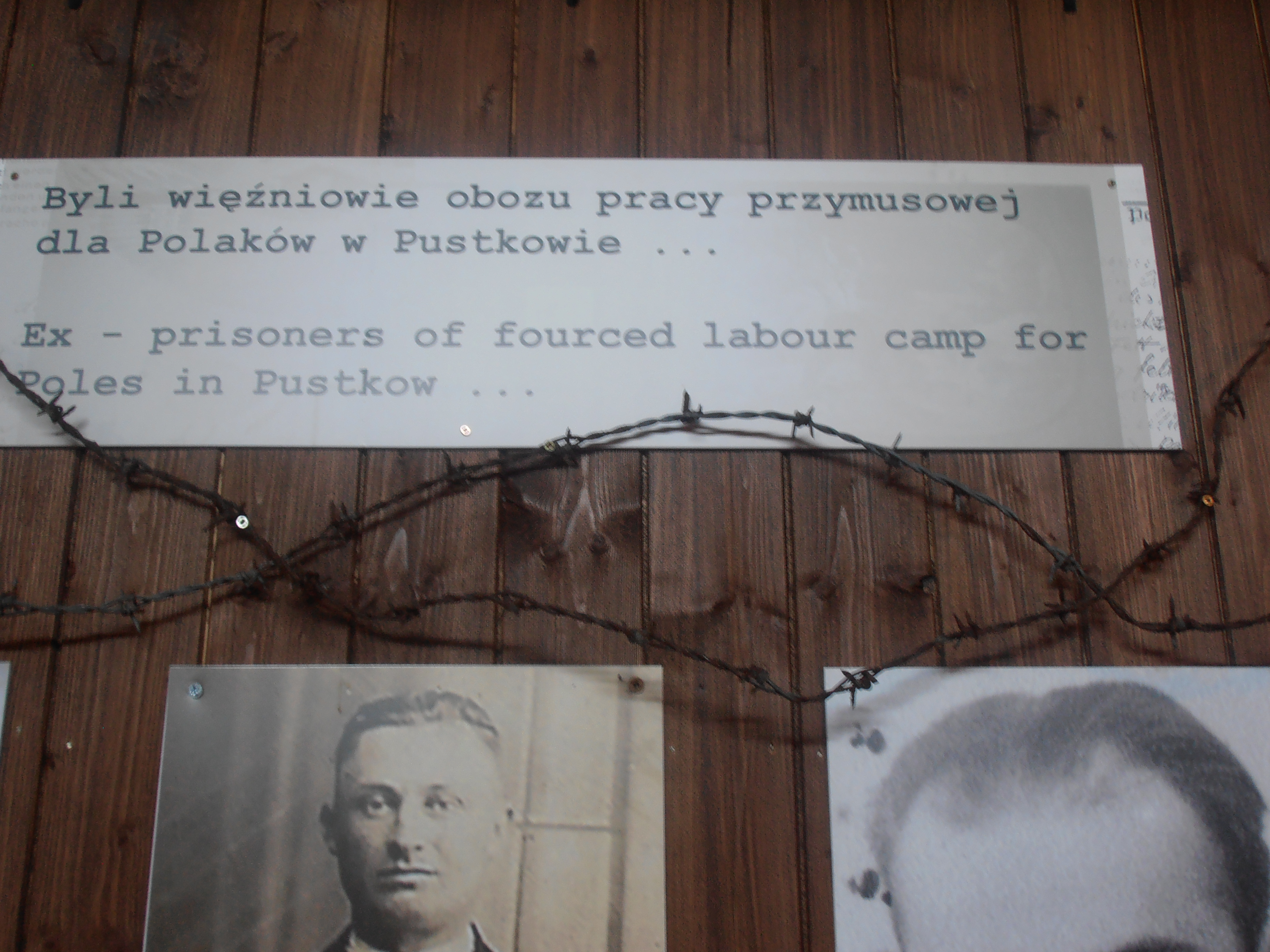
Photographs of prisoners of SS-Truppenübungsplatz Heidelager

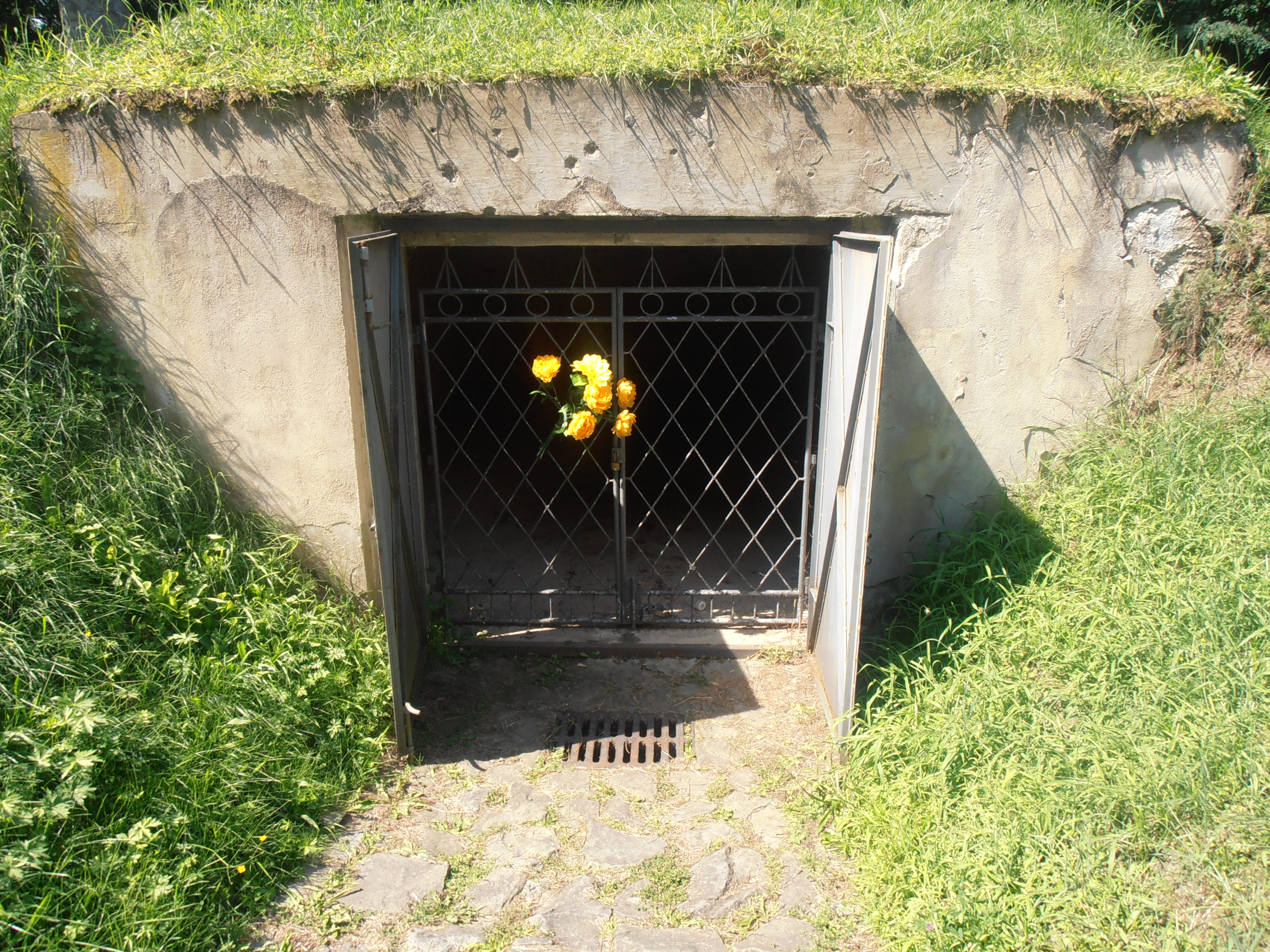
Crematorium on Góra Śmierci, Pustków

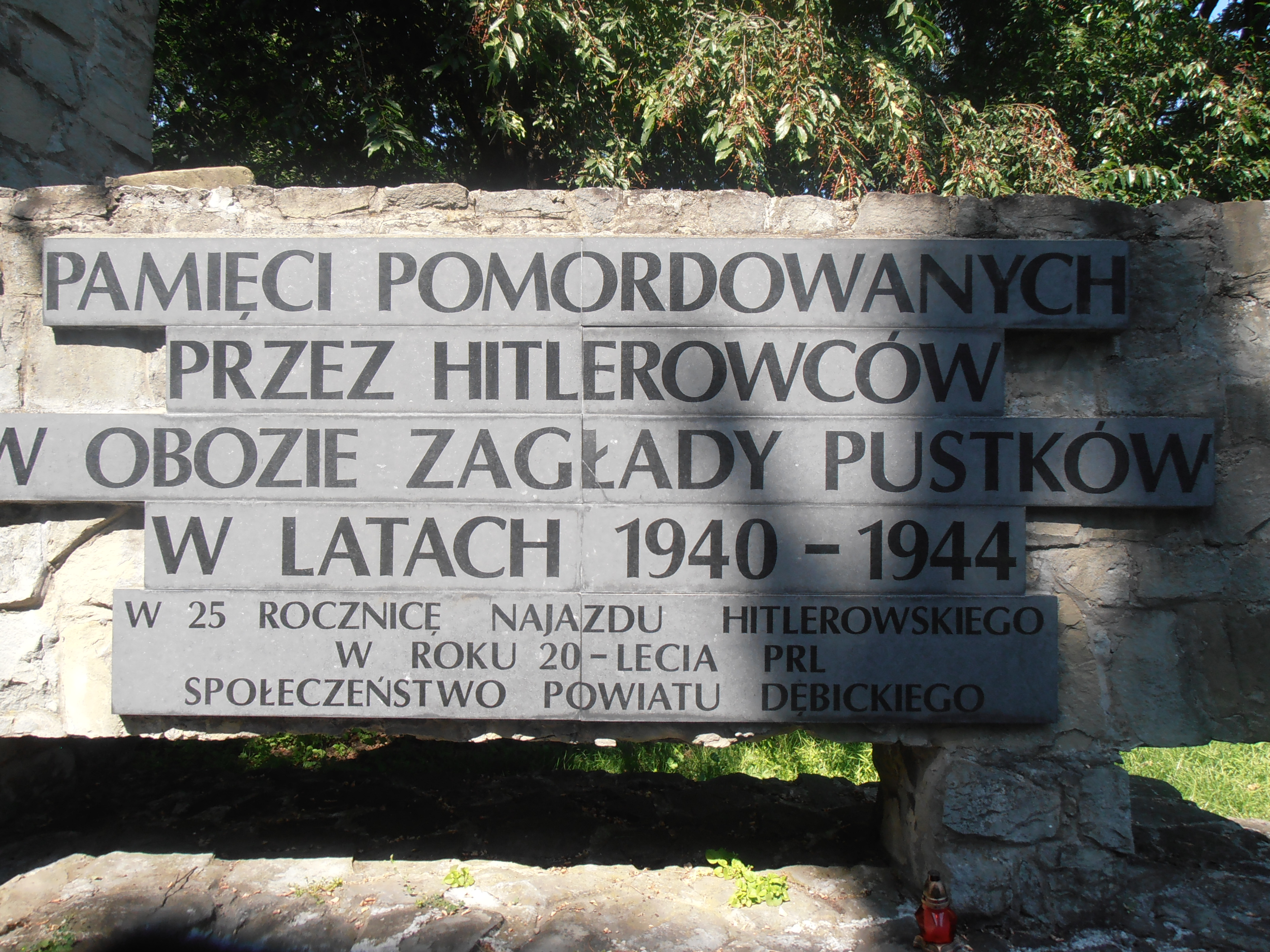
Memorial on Góra Śmierci to all who died at the concentration camp

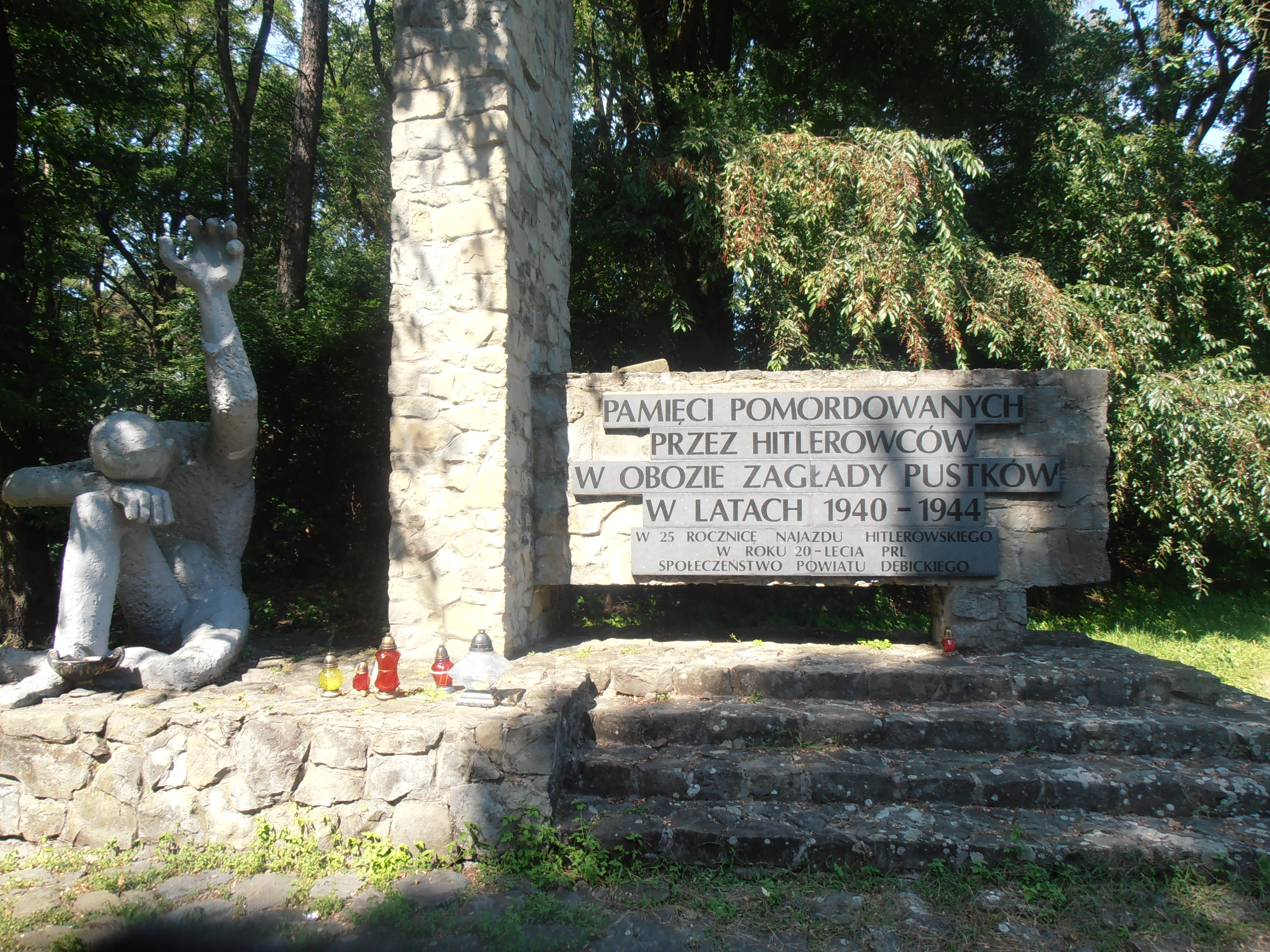
Memorial on Góra Śmierci

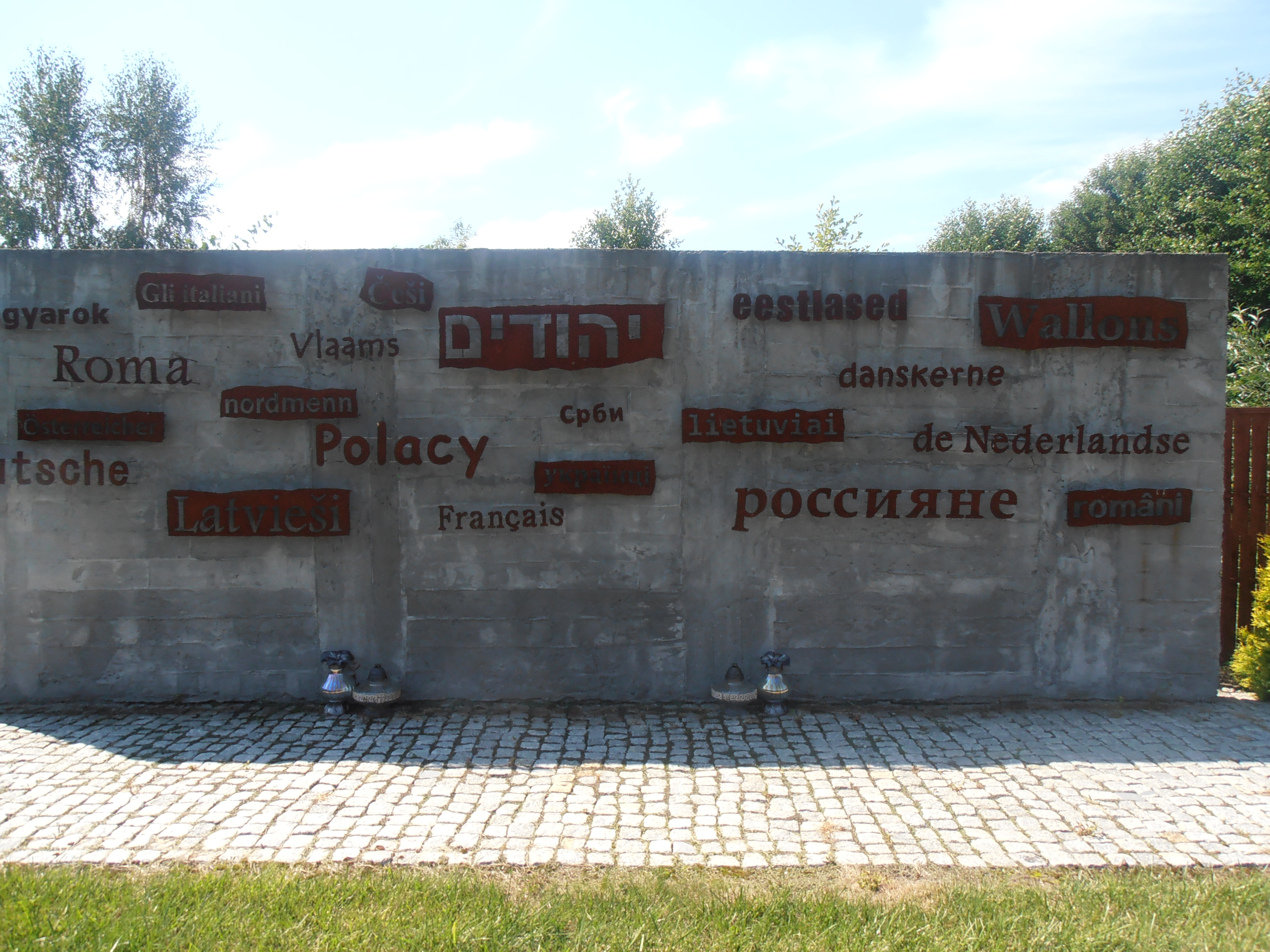
Peace Memorial at SS-Truppenübungsplatz Heidelager
