= Stobierna =

Stobierna may refer to the following places:

- Stobierna, Dębica County in Subcarpathian Voivodeship (south-east Poland)
- Stobierna, Rzeszów County in Subcarpathian Voivodeship (south-east Poland)
