= Krzysztof Pyskaty =

Polish footballer (born 1974)

Personal information
- Full name: Krzysztof Pyskaty
- Date of birth: 18 January 1974 (age 52)
- Place of birth: Dębica, Poland
- Height: 1.83 m (6 ft 0 in)
- Position: Goalkeeper

Senior career*
Years	Team	Apps	(Gls)
1991–1992	Podkarpacie Pustynia		
1992–1995	Igloopol Dębica		
1995–1996	Wisłoka Dębica		
1996–1999	Korona Kielce		
2000	Świt Nowy Dwór Mazowiecki		
2000–2002	Śląsk Wrocław	41	(0)
2002	ŁKS Łódź	11	(0)
2003	Stal Stalowa Wola	12	(0)
2003–2004	Tłoki Gorzyce	22	(0)
2004	Radomiak Radom	7	(0)
2005	Levadiakos	1	(0)
2005–2006	Igloopol Dębica		
2006–2008	Kolejarz Stróże		
2008–2009	Raków Częstochowa	28	(0)
2009–2010	Pogoń Szczecin	10	(0)
2011–2012	Limanovia Limanowa		
2012–2013	KS Zakopane		
2013	Lubań Maniowy		
- * Club domestic league appearances and goals

Krzysztof Pyskaty (born 18 January 1974) is a Polish former professional footballer who played as a goalkeeper.
