= Gmina Dębica =

Gmina Dębica Dębica Commune
- Gmina
- Coat of arms
- Interactive map of Gmina Dębica
- Coordinates (Dębica): 50°3′N 21°25′E
- Country: Poland
- Voivodeship: Subcarpathian
- County: Dębica
- Seat: Dębica

Area
  - Total: 137.62 km^{2} (53.14 sq mi)

Population (2006)
  - Total: 23,953
  - Density: 174.05/km^{2} (450.79/sq mi)
- Website: https://www.ugdebica.pl

Gmina Dębica is a rural gmina (administrative district) in Dębica County, Subcarpathian Voivodeship, in south-eastern Poland. Its seat is the town of Dębica, although the town is not part of the territory of the gmina.

The gmina covers an area of 137.62 square kilometres (53.1 sq mi), and as of 2006 its total population is 23,953.

== Sołectwos ==
Gmina Dębica is subdivided into 19 sołectwos: Braciejowa, Brzeźnica, Brzeźnica-Wola, Głobikowa, Gumniska, Kędzierz, Kochanówka, Kozłów, Latoszyn, Nagawczyna, Paszczyna, Podgrodzie, Pustków-Wieś, Pustków Osiedle, Pustków-Krownice, Pustynia, Stasiówka, Stobierna and Zawada. Other villages include Bobrek (near Zawada).

== Neighbouring gminas ==
Gmina Dębica is bordered by the town of Dębica and by the gminas of Brzostek, Czarna, Ostrów, Pilzno, Przecław, Ropczyce and Żyraków.
