= Kochanówka, Podkarpackie Voivodeship =

Kochanówka
- Village
- Location within Poland
- Coordinates: 50°7′37″N 21°33′43″E
- Country: Poland
- Voivodeship: Subcarpathian
- County: Dębica
- Gmina: Dębica

Kochanówka [kɔxaˈnufka] is a village in the administrative district of Gmina Dębica, within Dębica County, Subcarpathian Voivodeship, in south-eastern Poland.
