= Straszęcin =

- Village
- Location within Poland
- Coordinates: 50°3′51″N 21°21′33″E
- Country: Poland
- Voivodeship: Subcarpathian
- County: Dębica
- Gmina: Żyraków
- Population: 1,500

Straszęcin [straˈʂɛnt͡ɕin] is a village in the administrative district of Gmina Żyraków, within Dębica County, Subcarpathian Voivodeship, in south-eastern Poland. Between 1988 and 1990 Straszęcin had been connected with Dębica by trolleybus line.
