= Głobikowa =

- Village
- Location within Poland
- Coordinates: 49°57′N 21°27′E
- Country: Poland
- Voivodeship: Subcarpathian
- County: Dębica
- Gmina: Dębica
- Elevation: 452 m (1,483 ft)
- Website: www.globikowa.republika.pl

Głobikowa [ɡwɔbiˈkɔva] is a village in the administrative district of Gmina Dębica, within Dębica County, Subcarpathian Voivodeship, in south-eastern Poland.
