= Brzeźnica-Wola =

- Village
- Location within Poland
- Coordinates: 50°5′51″N 21°29′47″E
- Country: Poland
- Voivodeship: Subcarpathian
- County: Dębica
- Gmina: Dębica

Brzeźnica-Wola [bʐɛʑˈnit͡sa ˈvɔla] is a village in the administrative district of Gmina Dębica, within Dębica County, Subcarpathian Voivodeship, in south-eastern Poland.
