= Pustków, Podkarpackie Voivodeship =

Pustków
- Village
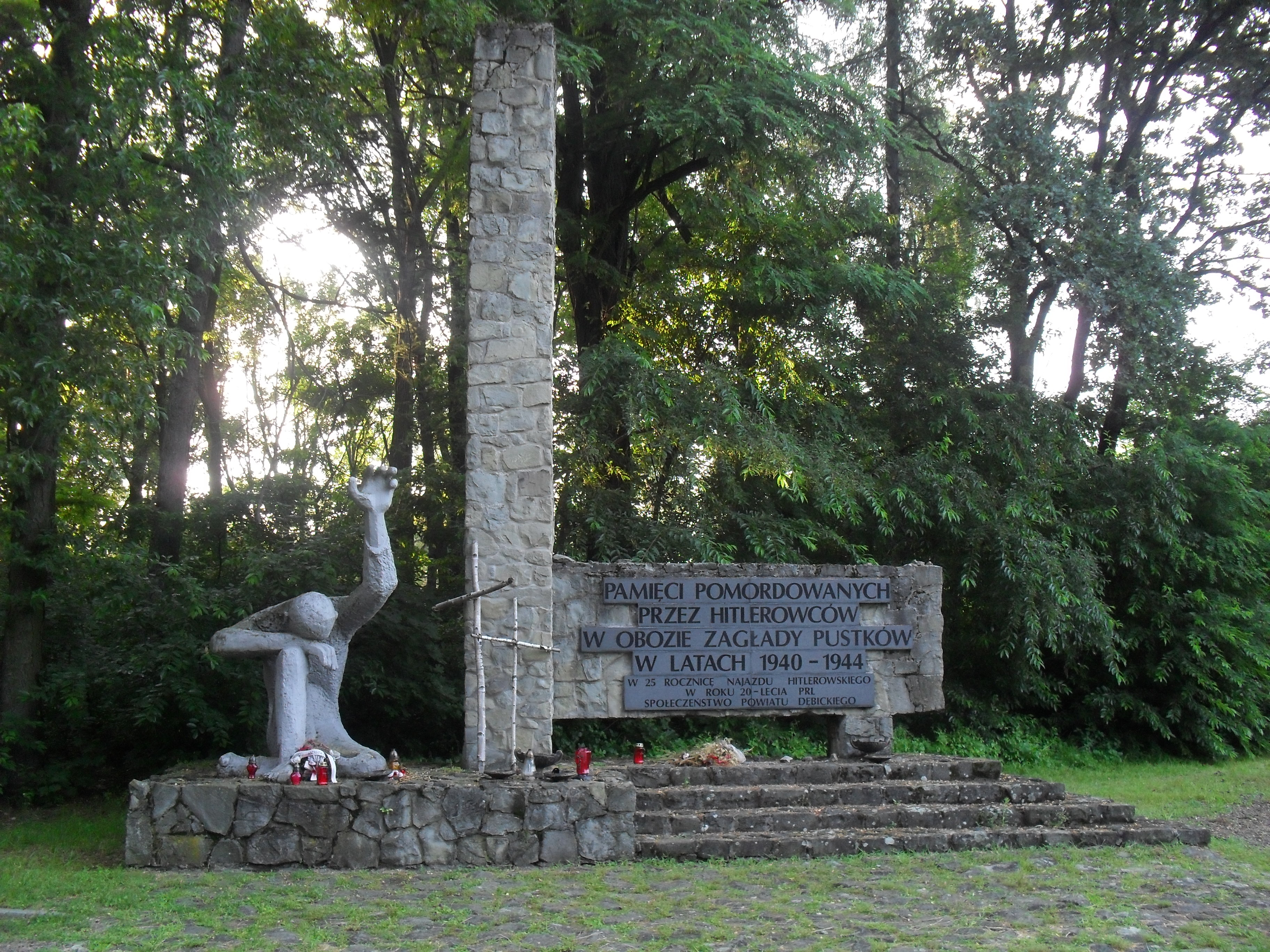
- Monument commemorating the Polish victims of German camp Heidelager, Pustków 2009

- Location within Poland
- Coordinates: 50°8′25″N 21°29′20″E
- Country: Poland
- Voivodeship: Subcarpathian
- County: Dębica
- Gmina: Dębica
- Population: 5,588

Pustków [ˈpustkuf] is a village in the administrative district of Gmina Dębica, within Dębica County, Subcarpathian Voivodeship, in south-eastern Poland. The settlement is nearly synonymous with the adjacent Pustków Osiedle housing estate built in the 1930s for employees of the mining explosives factory of the Central Industrial Region. The total area of Pustków – the largest village in Gmina Dębica – is 2,285 hectares (5,650 acres) with 2,925 residents (2003); while the area of Pustków Osiedle – the smallest one – is 150 hectares (370 acres) with comparable number of 2,727 residents in an urban setting.

== World War II ==
Pustków, as well as Pustków Osiedle were the location of the Nazi German troop-training facility called HL-Heidelager for the Ukrainian 14th Waffen SS Division "Galician", as well as other collaborationists military formations including Estonian. Their training, included also killing operations inside the camps and Jewish ghettos in the vicinity of Pustków and in the town itself, most notably, at the Pustków and Szebnie concentration camp nearby.

=== Heidelager ===
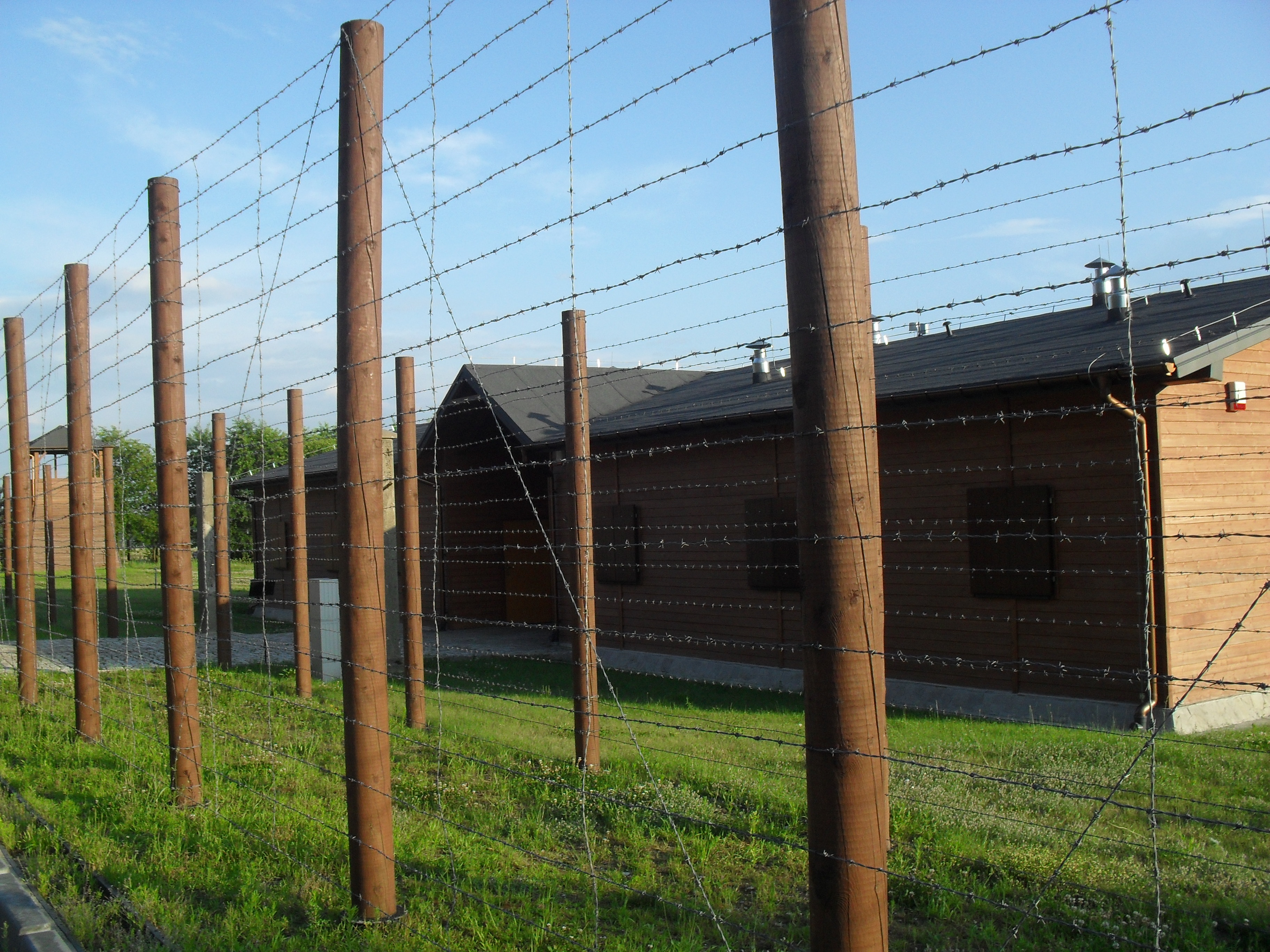
Reconstructed camp barracks with a watchtower and the barbed-wire fence

Locals who lived in the vicinity were evicted already in mid-1940. The HL-Heidelager Military Training Base known in German as the SS-Truppenübungsplatz Heidelager eventually, was set up north-east of Dębica not far from Blizna, using slave labor from the neighboring concentration camp located beneath Królowa Góra mountain, which held 7,000 Jews, 5,000 Soviet POWs, and 3,000 Poles (most of them annihilated before July 1944). The training range was in use since the fall of 1941 under the command of SS Oberführer Werner von Schele. The title Heidelager was adjusted from the original SS TruppenÜbungsPlatz "Ostpolen" on August 25, 1943. The last commandant of the training base was SS Oberführer Bernhardt Voss until the summer of 1944.

The facility resembled a small city with its own narrow gauge railroad, some 3,600 men of different nationalities, cinemas, dining halls, dozens of villas, a newsletter, even a camp brothel staffed by female prisoners from the slave-labor camp nearby, and the hunting parties for the high-ranking officers. This is where the Galizien Division came into existence. The range was visited by Reichsführer-SS Heinrich Himmler on September 28, 1943, and abandoned in the summer of 1944 ahead of the Soviet advance.
