= Latoszyn =

- Village
- Location within Poland
- Coordinates: 50°2′N 21°22′E
- Country: Poland
- Voivodeship: Subcarpathian
- County: Dębica
- Gmina: Dębica
- Population: 1,700

Latoszyn [laˈtɔʂɨn] is a village in the administrative district of Gmina Dębica, within Dębica County, Subcarpathian Voivodeship, in south-eastern Poland.
