= Podgrodzie, Podkarpackie Voivodeship =

Podgrodzie
- Village
- Location within Poland
- Coordinates: 50°0′N 21°20′E
- Country: Poland
- Voivodeship: Subcarpathian
- County: Dębica
- Gmina: Dębica
- Population: 1,600

Podgrodzie [pɔdˈɡrɔd͡ʑɛ] is a village in the administrative district of Gmina Dębica, within Dębica County, Subcarpathian Voivodeship, in south-eastern Poland.
