= Krzysztof Cios =

Data scientist

Krzysztof J. Cios
- Education: AGH University (M.S. and Ph.D.); Polish Academy of Sciences (D.Sc.); University of Toledo (M.B.A.)
- Scientific career
- Fields: Computer Science; Machine Learning; Data Mining; Biomedical informatics Neuroinformatics
- Workplaces: Virginia Commonwealth University (2007–); University of Colorado Denver (2000–2007); University of Toledo (1985–2000)

Krzysztof J. Cios (born 1950) is a Professor Emeritus of the Department of Computer Science, School of Engineering, Virginia Commonwealth University (VCU), located in Richmond, Virginia. His research is focused on machine learning, data mining, and biomedical informatics.

== Biography ==
Krzysztof J. Cios, a Polish-American computer scientist, was born in Dębica, Poland. He earned his M.S. in electrical engineering and Ph.D. degrees in computer science, both from the AGH University, Kraków, Poland. Cios also earned his D.Sc. (habilitation) degree from the Polish Academy of Sciences, Warsaw and an M.B.A. degree from the University of Toledo, Ohio.

He worked at the Krakow Polytechnic, Kraków, and the International Atomic Energy Agency, Vienna, Austria, and at the University of Toledo (UT), Ohio. He was a Fulbright Scholar at the National Institute of Cardiology, Warsaw, Poland. He also worked as a visiting scientist at NASA Glenn Research Center, Cleveland, Ohio, and at the University of Colorado Denver. He consulted for Lockheed Martin and worked as a visiting professor at the Complutense University of Madrid, Spain, and at the Muroran Institute of Technology, Japan. He retired from Virginia Commonwealth University, Richmond, Virginia.

Prof. Cios co-authored three books and many journal and conference papers. His main contributions are in the areas of machine learning, computational neuroscience, and data mining.

Prof. Cios has been the recipient of the Norbert Wiener Outstanding Paper Award (Kybernetes), the University of Toledo Outstanding Faculty Research Award, the Neurocomputing Best Paper Award and the Fulbright Senior Scholar Award. He is listed by the Kosciuszko Foundation as one of the eminent scientists of Polish origin and ancestry, He is a Foreign Member of the Polish Academy of Arts and Sciences, a Fellow of the American Institute for Medical and Biological Engineering, a Fellow of the Asia-Pacific Association of Artificial Intelligence, and a Life Fellow of the IEEE ("for contributions to data mining and machine learning").

== Works ==
- KJ Cios; W Pedrycz; R Swiniarski; LA Kurgan (Oct 5, 2007). Data Mining: A Knowledge Discovery Approach. Springer Science & Business Media. p. 606. ISBN 978-0-3873-6795-8.
- KJ Cios, ed. (Jan 12, 2001). Medical Data Mining and Knowledge Discovery. Physica-Verlag HD. p. 496. ISBN 978-3-7908-1340-1.
- KJ Cios; W Pedrycz; R Swiniarski (Aug 31, 1998). Data Mining Methods for Knowledge Discovery. Springer US. p. 495. ISBN 978-0-7923-8252-2.
