= Braciejowa =

- Village
- Location within Poland
- Coordinates: 49°59′N 21°26′E
- Country: Poland
- Voivodeship: Subcarpathian
- County: Dębica
- Gmina: Dębica

Braciejowa [brat͡ɕɛˈjɔva] is a village in the administrative district of Gmina Dębica, within Dębica County, Subcarpathian Voivodeship, in south-eastern Poland.
