= Pustków-Krownice =

- Village
- Location within Poland
- Coordinates: 50°8′43″N 21°31′29″E
- Country: Poland
- Voivodeship: Subcarpathian
- County: Dębica
- Gmina: Dębica

Pustków-Krownice [ˈpustkuf krɔvˈnit͡sɛ] is a village in the administrative district of Gmina Dębica, within Dębica County, Subcarpathian Voivodeship, in south-eastern Poland.
