= Brzeźnica, Podkarpackie Voivodeship =

Brzeźnica
- Village
- Location within Poland
- Coordinates: 50°6′2″N 21°28′53″E
- Country: Poland
- Voivodeship: Subcarpathian
- County: Dębica
- Gmina: Dębica
- Population: 2,800

Brzeźnica [bʐɛʑˈnit͡sa] is a village in the administrative district of Gmina Dębica, within Dębica County, Subcarpathian Voivodeship, in south-eastern Poland.
