= Pustków Osiedle =

- Village
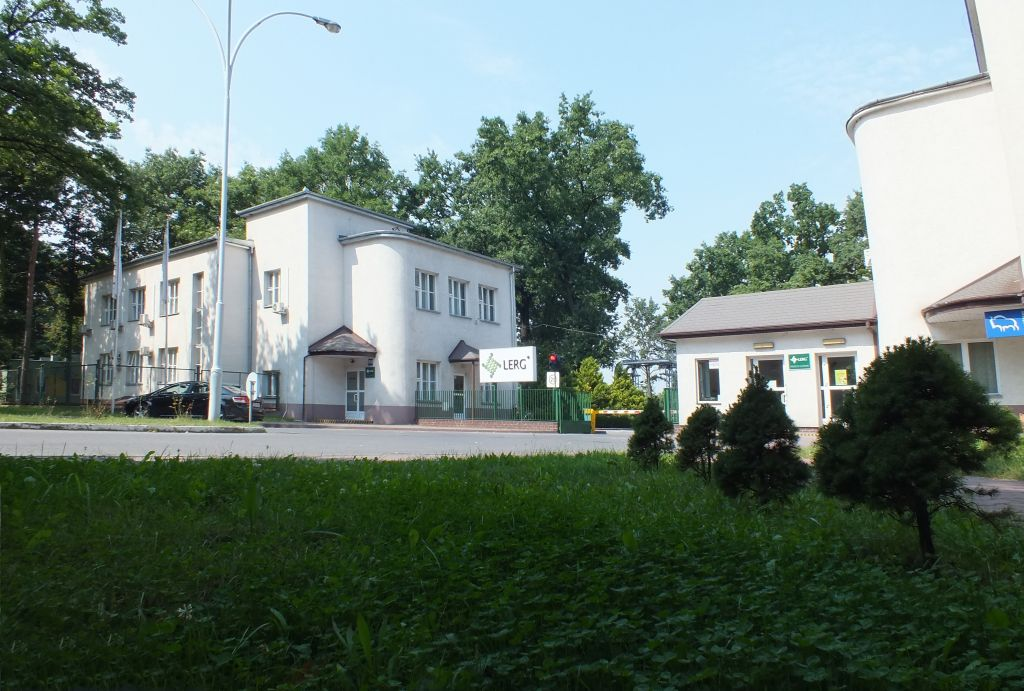
- LERG Chemical Plant, Pustków

- Location within Poland
- Coordinates: 50°6′54″N 21°30′46″E
- Country: Poland
- Voivodeship: Subcarpathian
- County: Dębica
- Gmina: Dębica
- Population: 2,727

Pustków Osiedle [ˈpustkuf ɔˈɕɛdlɛ] is a village in the administrative district of Gmina Dębica, within Dębica County, Subcarpathian Voivodeship, in south-eastern Poland (historic Lesser Poland). The housing estate (Polish: Osiedle) – built in the 1930s – is nearly synonymous with the adjacent Pustków village. Total area of Pustków Osiedle – the smallest village in Gmina Dębica – is 150 hectares (370 acres); while the area of Pustków – the largest – is 2,285 hectares (5,650 acres).

The history of Pustków Osiedle is closely connected with Central Industrial Area, one of the biggest public works projects of the Second Polish Republic. Before the mid-1930s, it did not exist. A small settlement, located in the Sandomierz Forest, was known simply as Pustków. It was the location of the notorious Pustków concentration camp in World War II.

== History ==
Owing to favorable location (near a rail line from Dębica to Tarnobrzeg, and away from large cities), in 1937 first trees were cut some three kilometers (1.9 miles) south of Pustków. Construction of a Lignoza factory began, together with a settlement for the workers - blocks of flats and villas for managers and engineers. The factory was a branch of Lignoza Corporation from Katowice, and its official name was Lignoza S.A. Katowice - Wytwórnia Pustków. It manufactured ammunition as well as plastic materials. Production started in April 1939, and on September 8, 1939 (see Invasion of Poland), first units of the Wehrmacht entered the settlement. Germans completed the construction of blocks of flats, which they used as military barracks. All machines and plastics were transported into the Third Reich.

In 1940-1944, a German labor camp (SS Truppenubungsplatz Heidelager Pustków) existed near Pustków Osiedle. Altogether, some 15,000 Jews, Poles and Soviet POWs were murdered here. Prisoners were forced to work on the development of the V-2 rocket, and the SS controlled the area stretching from Mielec to Kolbuszowa. The camp existed until July 23, 1944, it is commemorated by a monument, located on the so-called Hill of Death (Góra Śmierci whose real name is Mount "Królowa Góra").

== Economy ==
After World War II, the factory was expanded, and production of plastic was initiated in 1946. In the People's Republic of Poland, the plant, called Zakłady Tworzyw Sztucznych ERG Pustków (Plastic Works ERG Pustków), manufactured glue, polyester resin, bakelite, laminates and other plastics. Together with the plant, the settlement expanded, with new blocks of flats, hostel for workers, house of culture with a cinema, health center, swimming pool and sports facilities of sports club Chemik, established in 1954. In 1992, Plastic Works ERG Pustków were privatized. In 2009, the plant was renamed into Lerg SA.
