= Kędzierz =

- Village
- Location within Poland
- Coordinates: 50°5′N 21°26′E
- Country: Poland
- Voivodeship: Subcarpathian
- County: Dębica
- Gmina: Dębica

Kędzierz [ˈkɛnd͡ʑɛʂ] is a village in the administrative district of Gmina Dębica, within Dębica County, Subcarpathian Voivodeship, in south-eastern Poland.
