= Kozłów, Podkarpackie Voivodeship =

Kozłów
- Village
- Location within Poland
- Coordinates: 50°5′17″N 21°27′32″E
- Country: Poland
- Voivodeship: Subcarpathian
- County: Dębica
- Gmina: Dębica
- Population: 550

Kozłów [ˈkɔzwuf] is a village in the administrative district of Gmina Dębica, within Dębica County, Subcarpathian Voivodeship, in south-eastern Poland.
