= Pustynia, Podkarpackie Voivodeship =

Pustynia
- Village
- Location within Poland
- Coordinates: 50°5′N 21°27′E
- Country: Poland
- Voivodeship: Subcarpathian
- County: Dębica
- Gmina: Dębica
- Population: 1,100

Pustynia [pusˈtɨɲa] is a village in the administrative district of Gmina Dębica, within Dębica County, Subcarpathian Voivodeship, in south-eastern Poland.
