= Zawada, Podkarpackie Voivodeship =

Zawada
- Village
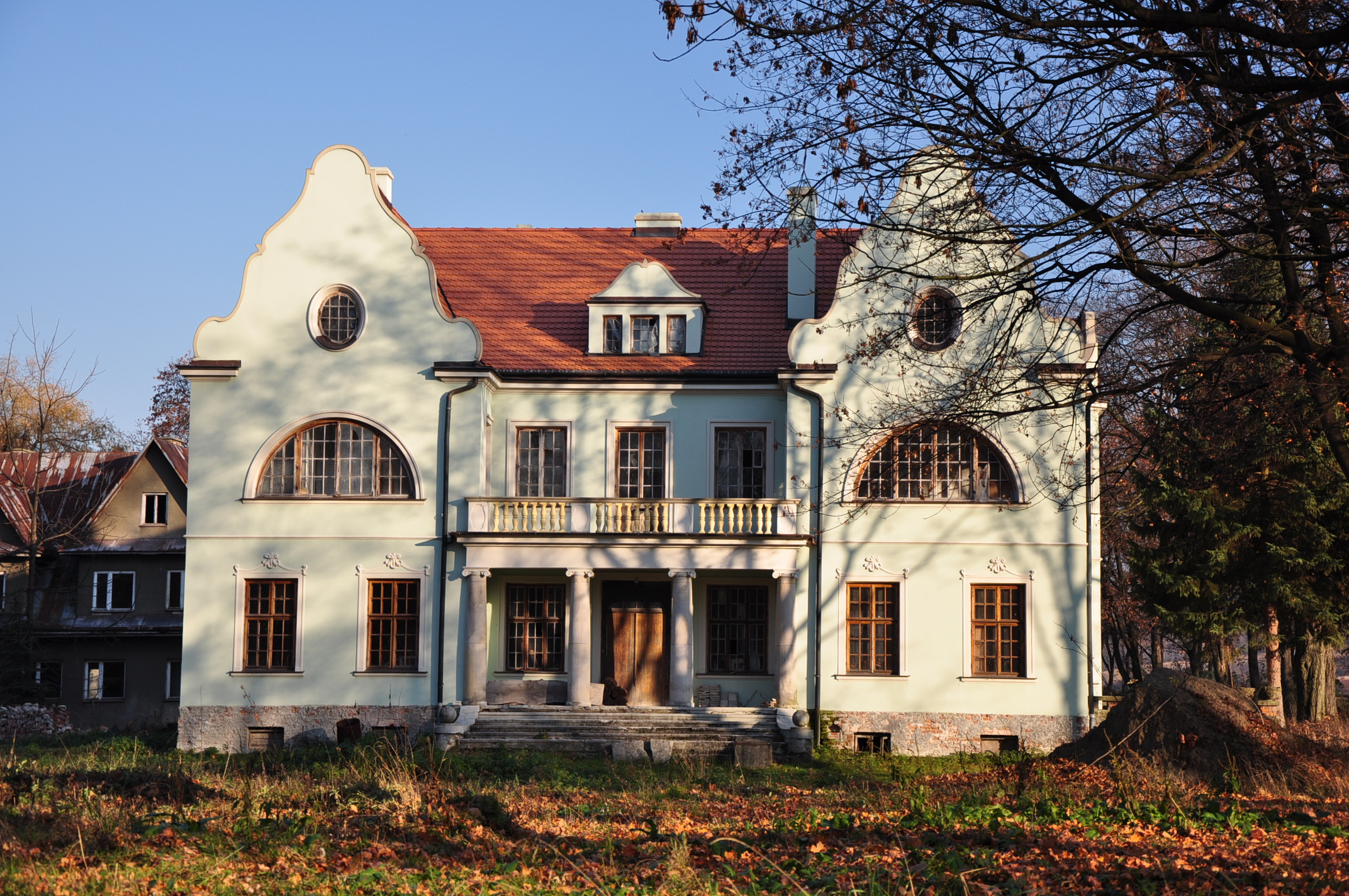
- Old manor house of Edward Aleksander Raczyński

- Location within Poland
- Coordinates: 50°3′41″N 21°29′9″E
- Country: Poland
- Voivodeship: Subcarpathian
- County: Dębica
- Gmina: Dębica

Population
  - Total: 1,300
- Time zone: UTC+1 (CET)
  - Summer (DST): UTC+2 (CEST)
- Postal code: 39-200
- Vehicle registration: RDE

Zawada [zaˈvada] is a village in the administrative district of Gmina Dębica, within Dębica County, Subcarpathian Voivodeship, in south-eastern Poland.
