= Stobierna, Dębica County =

Stobierna
- Village
- Location within Poland
- Coordinates: 50°1′49″N 21°29′27″E
- Country: Poland
- Voivodeship: Subcarpathian
- County: Dębica
- Gmina: Dębica
- Population (approx.): 1,500

Stobierna [stɔˈbjɛrna] is a village in the administrative district of Gmina Dębica, within Dębica County, Subcarpathian Voivodeship, in south-eastern Poland.

The population of the village is approximately 1,500.
