= Schutzmannschaft Battalion 204 =

204st Schutzmannschafts Battalion
- Active: Spring 1943 – July 1944
- Country: Germany
- Branch: SD
- Type: Battalion
- Role: Anti-partisan operations
- Size: 500 – 800 (July 1943)
- Part of: Ukrainian Auxiliary Police
- Engagements: World War II; Eastern Front of World War II; Polish resistance movement in World War II; Operation Tempest; Polish–Ukrainian conflict (1939–1947); Zamość uprising; Western Front of World War II; Maquis (World War II); Liberation of France; The Holocaust in Poland; The Holocaust in Belarus

Commanders
- Notable commanders: Vasily Tatarsky

The 204th Schutzmannschafts Battalion was a police guard unit composed from the ethnic Ukrainians personnel drafted at the Lemberg area of the Distrikt Galizien at January – February 1943. Members of the unit committed atrocities against Jews and Communist party members during early German occupation The unit provided guards for concentration camp Pustków. In July 1943 it was reinforced to 800 strength by the volunteers signed for the 14th Waffen Grenadier Division of the SS (1st Ukrainian). In late July 1944 battalion personnel was transferred into reserve regiment of the 14 SS Freiwilligen Division "Galizien”.

== Activity ==
The Pustkow Concentration Camps was created to support the production and the tests of the German V-1 and V-2 missiles – so due to the secrecy there no clear information about specific unit activities.
