= Dębica =

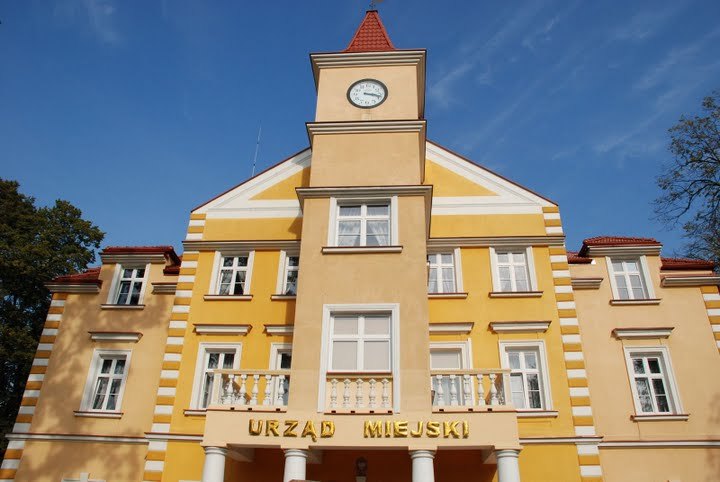
- Town hall

- Flag Coat of arms

- Location within Poland
- Coordinates: 50°3′N 21°25′E
- Country: Poland
- Voivodeship: Podkarpackie
- County: Dębica
- Gmina: Dębica (urban gmina)
- Established: 13th century
- Town rights: 1358

Government
  - Mayor: Mateusz Kutrzeba (PiS)

Area
  - City: 33.85 km^{2} (13.07 sq mi)
- Highest elevation: 407 m (1,335 ft)
- Lowest elevation: 176 m (577 ft)

Population (31 December 2021)
  - City: 44,692
  - Density: 1,320.3/km^{2} (3,420/sq mi)
  - Metro: 75,000
- Time zone: UTC+1 (CET)
  - Summer (DST): UTC+2 (CEST)
- Postal code: 39-200 to 39-210
- Area code: +48 14
- Car plates: RDE
- Website: http://www.debica.pl

Dębica ([dɛmˈbit͡sa] is a town in southeastern Poland with 44,692 inhabitants as of December 2021. It is the capital of Dębica County. Since 1999 it has been situated in the Podkarpackie Voivodeship; it had previously been in the Tarnów Voivodeship (1975–1998). Dębica belongs to the historic province of Lesser Poland, and for centuries it was part of the Sandomierz Voivodeship.

== Area and location ==
According to the 2006 data, Dębica's area is 33.81 square kilometres (13.05 sq mi). Arable land makes up 42% of the area of the town, while forests make 19%. Dębica is the seat of the county, and the town covers 4.34% of the county's area. Dębica lies at the border of two geographical regions of Poland—the Carpathian Piedmont in southern districts of the town and the Sandomierz Basin in its north, along the Wisłoka river.

== Economy ==
Since the mid-1930s Dębica, despite its size, has been a large industrial hub. A number of companies were then created thanks to government-led industrial development programs.

Most of these companies still exist today, though they were privatized in the 1990s:

- Firma Oponiarska Dębica S.A. (Tire Company Dębica) now owned by Goodyear Tire and Rubber Company, previous name - Stomil Dębica
- Lerg S.A. - a chemical manufacturer located in the village of Pustków, a village in Dębica County
- Tikkurila Polska S.A. (formerly Polifarb Dębica) - a paint manufacturer
- Wytwórnia Urządzeń Chłodniczych WUCh (Manufacturer of Refrigeration Equipment WUCh)
- Zakłady Mięsne (Meat Processing Plant)

Since the early 1990s a relatively large number (relative to the city's size) of successful companies have been started and run by local residents:

- Bicycle, motorcycle, and electric car manufacturer Arkus and Romet Group
- Sportatut - producer of sports nutritionals
- Chemical industry manufacturers (paint producers such as Śnieżka Brzeźnica and Plastbud Pustków)
- Marble producer Jabo Marmi and brickyard Igloobud
- Food companies such as Igloomeat and Animex Poludnie

== Transport ==
The A4 highway passes just north of the city, with two exits providing access to Dębica. The westbound section of the highway, from Dębica to Tarnów, was completed in October 2014. As a result, the city now has a direct highway connection to Poland's western border and, consequently, to all of Western Europe. A drive to Kraków (approximately 120 km (75 mi)) takes about an hour, while Rzeszów, the capital of the Subcarpathian Voivodeship, located east of Dębica, can be reached in under 30 minutes.

Dębica is also situated along National Road 94, which was previously part of the European route E40. This two-lane road has been renovated in recent years, but with the completion of the A4 highway, its importance has diminished. Additionally, Dębica is connected to the cities of Mielec and Tarnobrzeg via local road number 985. Dębica is located on a key railway line that runs from Poland's western to eastern borders. Trains on this line can reach speeds of up to 160 km/h, allowing the fastest Express InterCity Premium services to reach Kraków in just over an hour. Between 1988 and 1990, Dębica was also connected to Straszęcin by a trolleybus line.

== Education ==
Dębica has been home to two branches of higher education institutions:

- Wyższa Szkoła Informatyki i Zarządzania in Rzeszów, branch in Dębica
- University of Economics in Kraków, branch in Dębica

== History ==
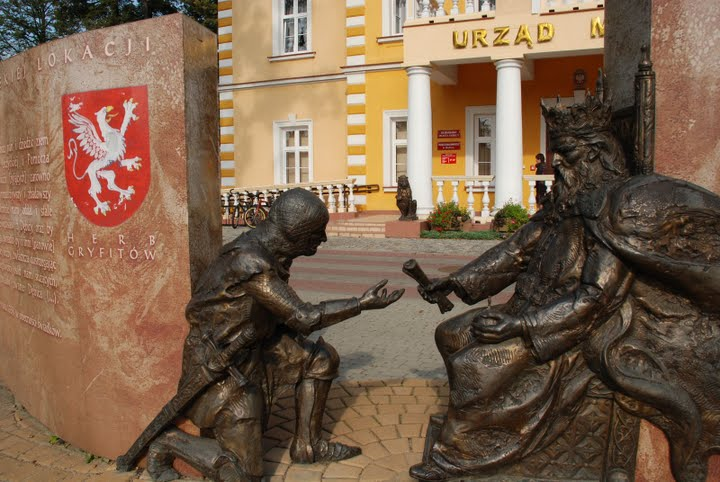
Monument depicting King Casimir III the Great giving Świętosław Gryfita permission to establish Dębica

=== Middle Ages ===
One of the oldest documented references to this area dates back to the year 1293. It records a settlement by the name of Dambicha, belonging to the noble Gryfita family. In 1305, the village was raided by the Tatars, who burned down a wooden church. The church was rebuilt in 1318, and by 1325, Dębica became the seat of a deanery, located on the outskirts of the mighty Sandomierz Forest. The Dębica Deanery consisted of fourteen parishes, including Przecław, Sędziszów Małopolski, and Strzyżów.

In 1358, King Casimir III the Great granted local nobleman Świętosław Gryfita permission to establish a town, and Dębica received town rights, along with the privilege to hold weekly markets on Wednesdays. However, the town was not officially founded until June 10, 1372, when Mikołaj of Lipiny was appointed its first wójt. Dębica was conveniently located along the main merchant route from Kraków to Lwów, but the newly founded town struggled to compete with older urban centers in the area, such as Pilzno and Ropczyce.

In 1446, King Władysław III of Poland authorized annual fairs to be held on Ash Wednesdays, spurring the town's growth. Despite this, Dębica remained a small town for many years, located in Pilzno County, part of the Sandomierz Voivodeship in the province of Lesser Poland. Without a defensive wall for protection, the town was vulnerable to invasions by the Tatars, Swedes, and Hungarians, who frequently burned or plundered it. As a result, few historical monuments have survived in Dębica. One notable exception is the Saint Jadwiga church, originally built in the 14th century but completely reconstructed in the late 19th century.

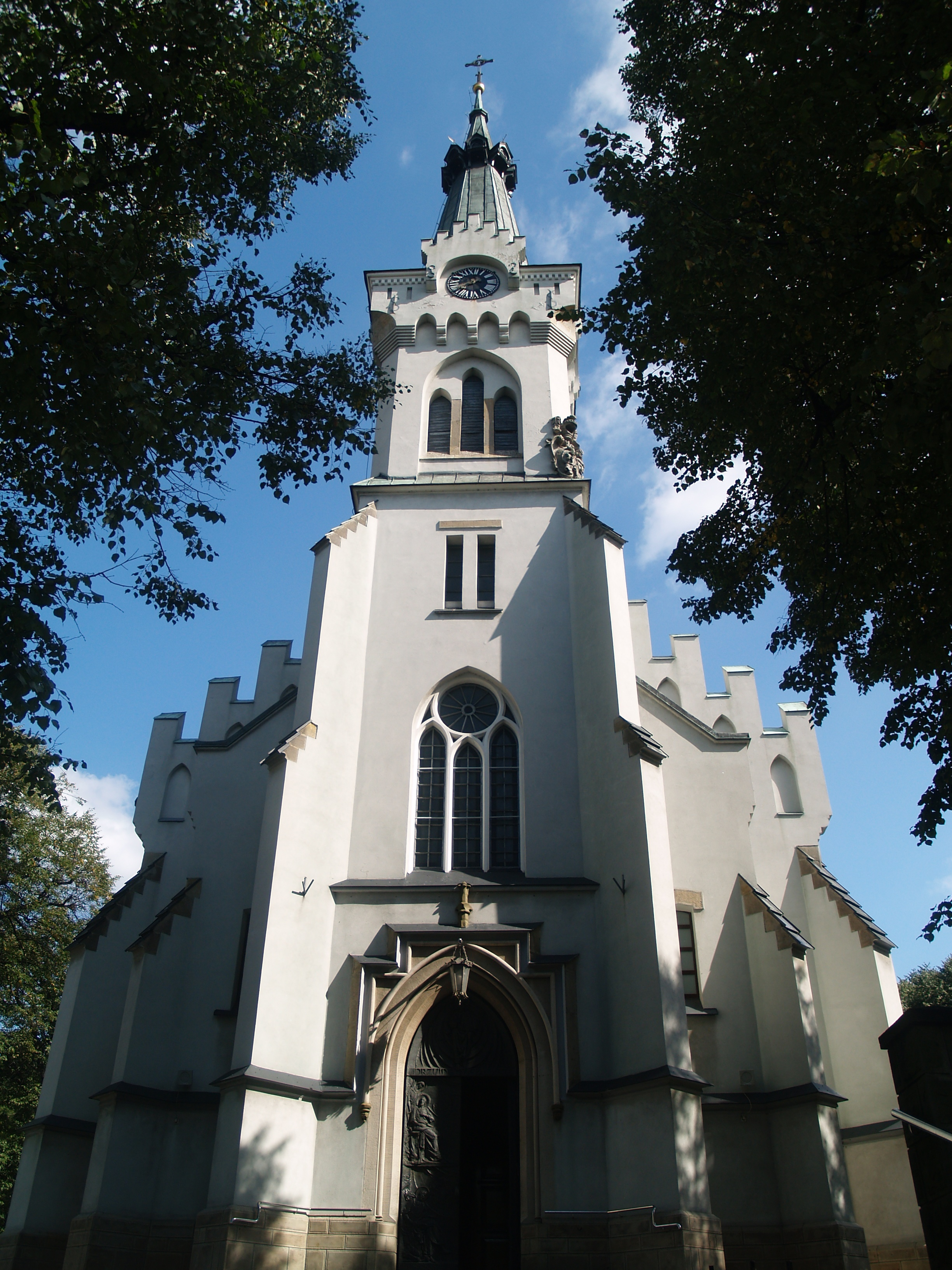
Church of St. Jadwiga, first erected in the 14th century

In 1474, Dębica, along with other towns in southern Lesser Poland, was ransacked by the Black Army of Hungary. In 1502, a Crimean Tatar raid caused widespread devastation, leaving the town burned and depopulated.

=== Early modern era ===
To prevent the complete disappearance of Dębica, its owners exempted residents from all taxes for 14 years, also allowing them to collect free timber and firewood in local forests. In 1504, Dębica was exempted from royal taxes by King Alexander Jagiellon. Due to all these privileges, Dębica emerged in the 16th century as a local center of skilled craftsmen. Still, it was much smaller than Pilzno and Ropczyce, also because it remained a private town, whose owners argued with each other. In 1554, most of Dębica burned down, together with the wooden parish church of St. Margaret. In the late 16th century, the population of the town was app. 700.

Like most of Lesser Poland's towns and cities, Dębica was completely destroyed in the Swedish invasion of Poland, when Swedes and Transylvanians of George II Rakoczi burned and ransacked the town (1655-1660). After the invasion, the population of Dębica was reduced to approximately 200, with only 30 houses. As a result, the owners of the town allowed the first Jews to settle in Dębica. The first settlers arrived in 1676–1690. They expanded the town's population, and had a positive influence on the town's economy.

In the late 17th century, the so-called New Dębica was established, around the now non-existing St. Barbara church, app. one kilometre (0.62 miles) west of Old Dębica. Both Dębicas had different mayors, who were governed by one wójt. In the course of time, the towns merged, and the market square of New Dębica now serves as the center of the town. Dębica was completely destroyed during the Great Northern War, and the destruction was so severe that the town slowly turned into a farming village. In the late 18th century, it belonged to the Radziwiłł family.

=== Late modern era ===
A battle between Poles and Russians took place here during the Bar Confederation, and in 1772, as a result of the First Partition of Poland, Dębica was annexed by the Habsburg Empire, as part of newly established Galicia, where it remained until November 1918. Austrian authorities decided that it should no longer be regarded as a town, but rather a village and renamed it Dembitz. This decision marked the decline of the town.

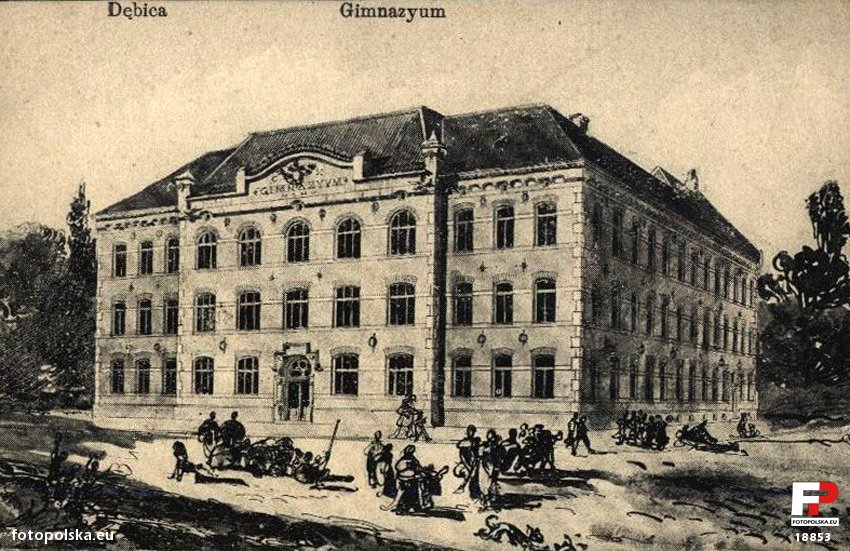
Dębica's oldest high school in the early 20th century

Bad times came to an end in the second half of the 19th century, when the Austrian government decided to build a main West-East railroad line (see Galician Railway of Archduke Charles Louis), connecting two major urban centres of Galicja — Kraków and Lwów. A railroad station was built in Dębica, and at the end of the 19th century, another, northbound line was constructed, joining Dębica and the town of Sandomierz, which was located on the Austrian-Russian boundary. The town became a rail junction, which was a huge boost for its citizens.

In 1900 a high school was opened, and in 1908 students from this school founded one of the oldest sports clubs in Poland, Wisłoka Dębica (whose name comes from the River Wisłoka, which flows by the town). Just before World War I, Dębica was again incorporated as a town. The war was a disaster for the town, as it was almost completely destroyed. During several campaigns, Dębica was occupied by Russian, Austrian, Hungarian and German troops, which fought in this area for many months in 1914-15. The Entente Powers wanted to get through the Carpathian Range towards Slovakia, Bohemia and Hungary, while the Central Powers managed to stop them at the beginning of 1915. These events had a great impact on the town and hampered its development for many years.

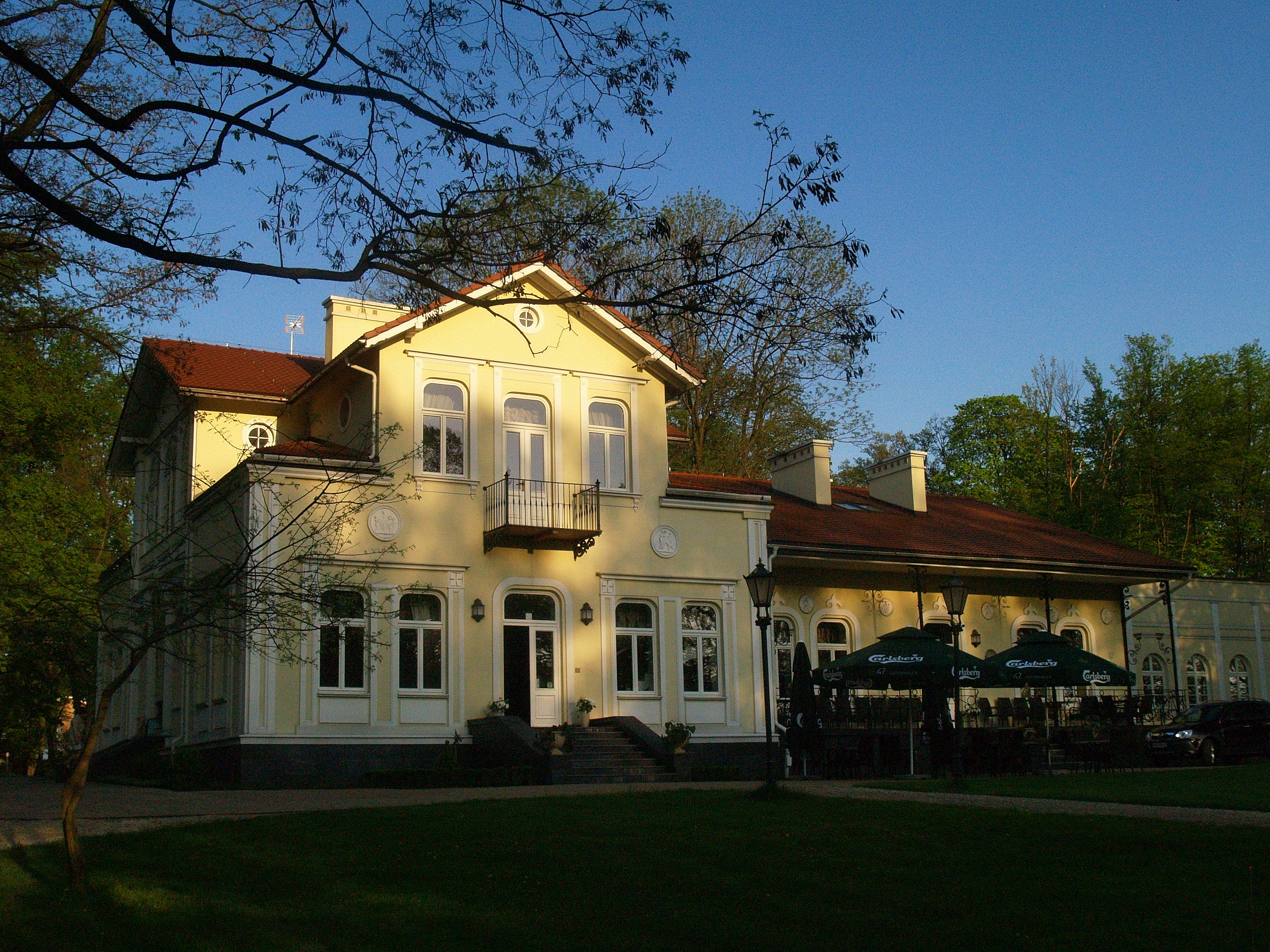
Late 19th-century manor

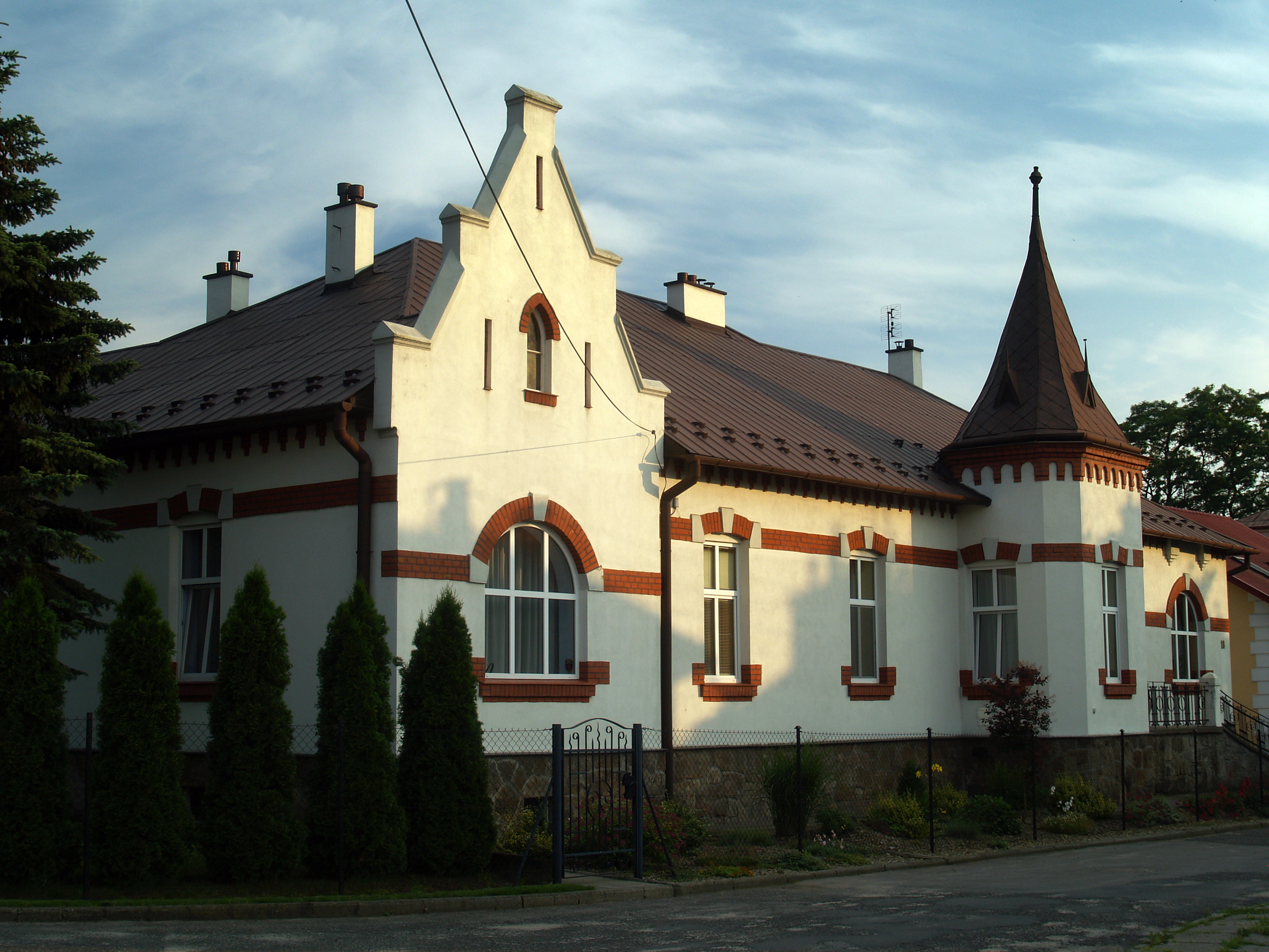
Early 20th-century villa

In 1918, after Poland regained independence, Dębica was included in the Kraków Voivodeship, in the county of Ropczyce. The economic situation of the town did not change - there was no industry, very few jobs were available, and surrounding villages were strongly overpopulated. This started to change in 1936, when Polish government announced the creation of the Central Industrial Area. It was a huge public works project, aimed at fighting unemployment in this overpopulated part of Poland, as well as creating heavy industry, concentrated on the production of arms. Dębica started to develop very fast; so fast, that in 1937 the county's capital was moved here from Ropczyce. Among several factories built in the town at that time, the most important was Stomil (now called Tire Company Dębica, and belonging to the Goodyear). Other factories were: Wytwórnia Urządzeń Chłodniczych WUCh and Zakłady Tworzyw Sztucznych "Pustków", built from scratch, together with a workers' settlement, in Pustków Osiedle, 15 km (9.3 mi) northeast of Dębica. Some time in 1938 or 1939 work on another rail connection from Dębica to Jasło, via Pilzno was started. the Second World War stopped this construction, and after the war it was not continued.

=== World War II ===
The occupation of Dębica by Nazi Germany started on 8 September 1939. The Einsatzgruppe I entered the town in September 1939 to commit various crimes against Poles. The Germans created a ghetto for the town's Jewish population, eventually killing most of them either on the spot or in the Auschwitz concentration camp. In the forested hills south of the town, strong Polish underground forces operated, with numerous units of the Home Army (AK). It was too dangerous for AK officers to stay in Dębica, thus the headquarters of a local underground district (known as Deser) were located at a nearby village of Gumniska, located in the hilly area south of the town. Resistance fighters were very active here, often attacking the main Kraków-Lwów rail line, used by German troops. In early 1944, units of the local Armia Krajowa district unsuccessfully tried to blow up a train with Hans Frank, which was passing through the village station at Czarna Tarnowska, some 15 kilometres (9 miles) west of Dębica. As a reprisal, on 2 February 1944, the Germans murdered 50 Poles by the rail track in Dębica (also see Otto Schimek).

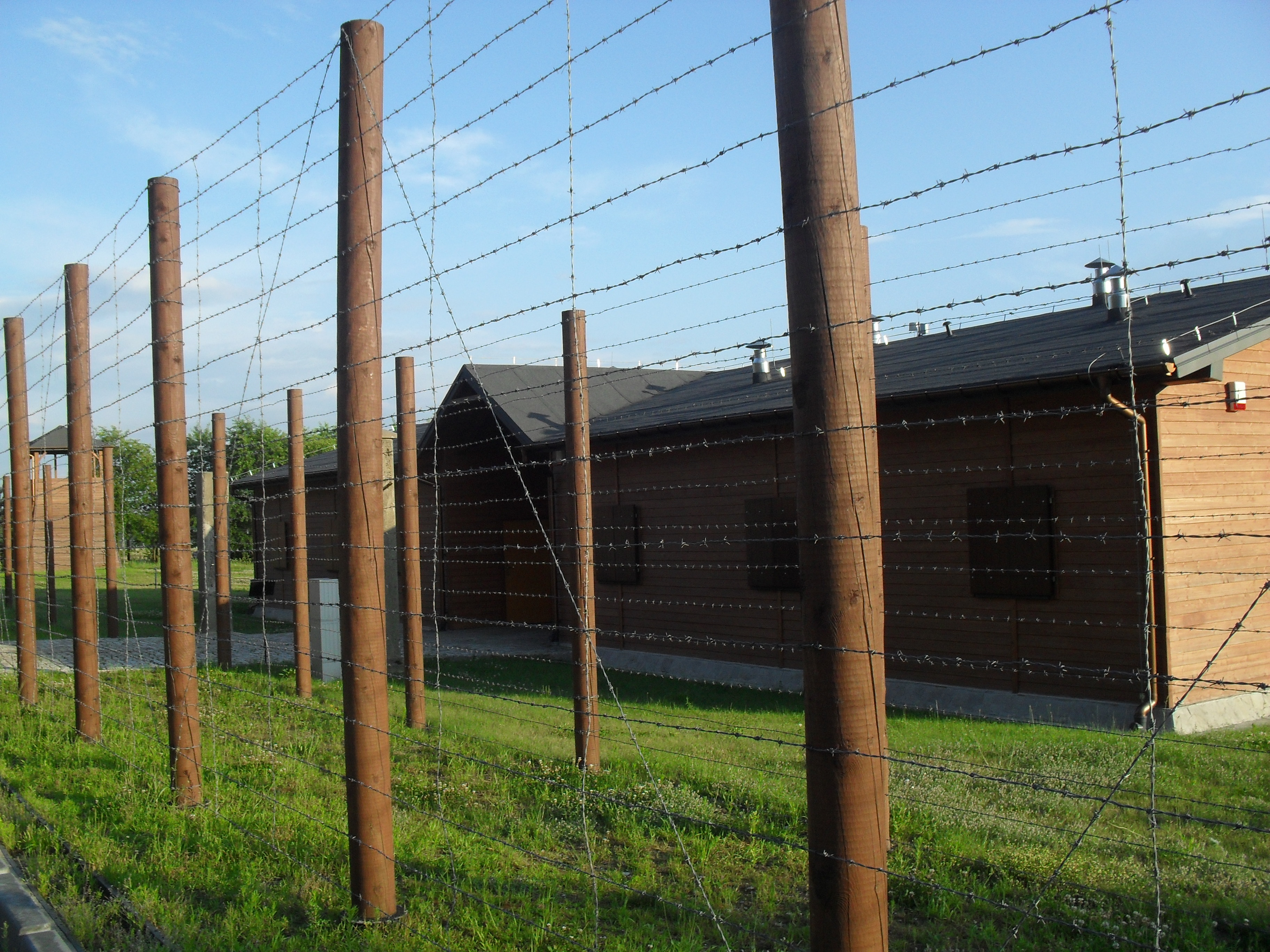
Reconstructed camp barracks with a watchtower and the barbed-wire fence in the village of Pustków

On the outskirts of Dębica, near the villages of Pustków and Blizna and several neighboring ones, the Germans established a massive military base called Heidelager in the fall of 1941, which included the Blizna V-2 missile launch site for weapons testing, and the training of new Ukrainian collaborationist military formations including the SS Galizien Division.

It is estimated that over the duration of the SS Heidelager training base operation, some 15,000 slave-labour prisoners perished there, including 7,500 Jews, 5,000 Soviet POWs, and 2,500 Poles, on top of an estimated 1,000 Soviet soldiers who died in the area during the Nazi-Soviet war. Their remains are buried in the cemetery along the road to Pustków Drips. Originally, the cemetery was located inside the ring IV (Dąbrówki). Later, the graves of soldiers were exhumed and moved. A Russian colonel killed in the fighting is buried in one of the tombs.

Implicated in war crimes was SS-man Alois Kurz (ID 382378) who, from 1940 to 21 April 1941, served in the SS Regiment Westland, then was assigned to a construction battalion for the SS training ground and labor camp serving the SS Truppenubungsplatz Heidelager in Pustków. Also implicated in war crimes was Wilhelm Schitli, commander of the "Jewish camp" at the SS training area HL-Heidelager from October 1942 to September 1943.

Polish priest Jan Nagórzański, who joined the Polish resistance and rescued Jews during the occupation, was arrested by the Germans, but was soon liberated by the Home Army in 1944. In 1945, he was beaten by Russian troops, and then fell ill with typhus and died in Dębica. In 1945, the town was restored to Poland, although with a Soviet-installed communist regime, which remained in power until the Fall of Communism in the 1980s.

=== Post-war ===
After the war, in new, Communist Poland, Dębica again became the seat of a county, but the town was moved from the Kraków to the Rzeszów Voivodeship. In 1946, executions of anti-communist activists took place there (1946 Public execution in Dębica). Polish priest Jan Wójcik, who aided Polish partisans and Jews during the German occupation, died in Dębica in 1954, shortly after he was released from prison by the communists, who imprisoned him in 1949.

War destruction again stopped the town's development, but recovery this time was fast and based on pre-war factories. In 1975, after administrative reform, counties in Poland ceased to exist and were replaced by numerous and small Voivodeships. Dębica again was moved - this time from Rzeszów to the newly created Tarnów Voivodeship. In the late 1970s, Dębica gained importance as a centre of food and agricultural production. This was due to the creation of Kombinat Rolno-Spozywczy Igloopol, which, under an influential Communist dignitary Edward Brzostowski, developed very fast. Igloopol built a huge factory and a completely new district, with numerous condominiums, located on the northern side of the rail line. The company achieved its peak in the late 1980s. After the collapse of the Communist regime, the company was divided into several smaller firms, controlled by former Communist activists.

== Sports ==
There are two major sports clubs in Dębica. Klub Sportowy (Sports Club) Wisłoka Dębica, founded in 1908, is one of the oldest sports organizations in the country. Wisłoka is famous for its wrestlers, who have won numerous medals in the Olympic Games, World and European Championships. Other fields in which Wisłoka's athletes achieved significant achievements are: soccer, boxing, cycling and karate. The club was sponsored by Tire Company Dębica and it had its heyday in the 1970s.

Another team, Igloopol Dębica, was founded in 1978 and is the brainchild of a prominent activist of Polish communist party, Edward Brzostowski. Igloopol enjoyed strong support from the local government. Brzostowski was for some time Minister of Agriculture and director of Polish Football Association, so his favorite team prospered in soccer as well as in boxing, achieving significant successes. Igloopol's best years, the late 1980s, are closely associated with the peak of its sponsor. Lately, both teams played in regional lower divisions, hoping to win promotion. Both clubs contest the Dębica derby, one of the fiercest derbies in south-eastern Poland.

== Notable residents ==
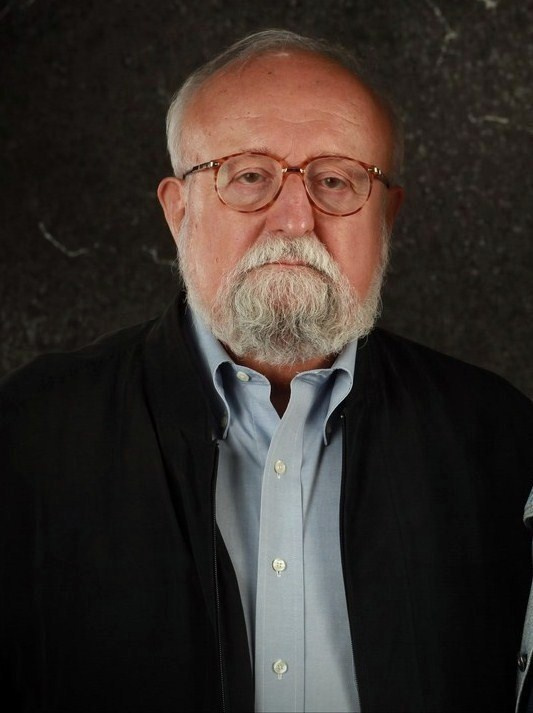
Krzysztof Penderecki

- Paweł Bochniewicz (born 1996), Polish professional footballer
- Krzysztof Cios (born 1950), computer scientist
- Jarosław Duda, computer scientist
- Seweryn Gancarczyk (born 1981), football defender
- Artur Jędrzejczyk (born 1987), Polish professional footballer
- Józef Lipień (born 1949), wrestler
- Kazimierz Lipień (1949–2005), wrestler
- Tadeusz Łomnicki (1927–1992), one of the most popular Polish actors
- Teresa Orlowski (born 1953), Polish film star and producer
- Krzysztof Penderecki (1933–2020), composer and conductor
- Waldemar Piatek (born 1979), football goalkeeper
- Leszek Pisz (born 1966), footballer
- Krzysztof Pyskaty (born 1974), Polish footballer
- Radek Rak (born 1987), writer, Nike Award laureate
- Rudolf Reder (1881–1977), one of only two survivors of the Bełżec extermination camp
- Ryszard Siwiec (1909–1968), Home Army resistance member who committed suicide by self-immolation in protest against the Soviet-led invasion of Czechoslovakia
- Paweł Wolak (born 1981), professional boxer, nicknamed "The Raging Bull"
- Jerzy Żuławski (1874–1915), writer, philosopher and translator

== Twin towns – sister cities ==
Dębica is twinned with:

- Carei, Romania
- Kapuvár, Hungary
- Muro, Spain
- Obzor, Bulgaria
- Svishtov, Bulgaria

Former twin towns:

- Puurs, Belgium

On 13 November 2020, the Belgian municipality of Puurs-Sint-Amands suspended its 20-year-long partnership with the Dębica because of the town's adoption of the Charter of The Rights of The Family, which discriminates against LGBT people.

== See also ==
- Public execution in Dębica (1946)
- Adam Lazarowicz
- 1985 Zieliński brothers escape
