= Piotr of Klecie =

Piotr z Klecia Arms

Piotr of Klecie also known as Piotr of Goraj, was a 14th-century knight and courtier in Poland. When he moved to the court of Casimir the Great, he established powerful noble family that would influence both state and church politics in Poland for the next two centuries.

Born about 1320 Piotr was the son of Gus of Goraj the Lord of Goraj. Piotr had a son Dymitr, to whom King Louis I of Hungary gave the villages of Goraj, and Turobin on 26 July 1377. Peter also had a son, Iwonia. In 1353, with his brothers Chodek and Ostaszek, Peter received from King Casimir III the Great a dozen villages including: Klecie, Czermno, Januszkowice, Glinik, and Bukowa, Smarżowa, and Kamienica Górna and Skurową.

== Family ==
His descendants included:

- Dobiesław Kurozwęcki (d. 1397) politician and Castellan of Kraków.
- Jan Oleśnicki (d. 1413) Starosta of Vilnius and a judge in Kraków.
- Zbigniew Oleśnicki
- Dymitr of Sienna (d. 1465), Castellan of Sanok and Priest in Skalbmierski, Canon of Kraków in 1452, and Gniezno from 1454, and heir to estates at Rymanowa
- Nicholas of Sienna (d. 1484), Canon of Kraków, a Scholasticus from 1448, Canon of Gniezno from 1455, Archdeacon of Sandomierz from 1478.
- Jan of Sienna and Oleska (died before 1477) Castellan of Lwów, Przemysl of the Chamber in 1439–1448, and Starost of Sandomierz.
- Jakob of Sienna (1413–1480), Archbishop of Gniezno from 1474, Bishop of Krakow, Bishop of Włocławek.
- Paul of Sienna (c. 1410–1444) the Royal Secretary (1439), royal courtier (1444)
- Andrzej Sienieński (d. 1494) Chamberlain of Sandomierz
- John Sienieński from Sienna and Oleska (d. between 1510 and 1513), Castellan of Małogoszcz.
- Victor Sienieński (c.1463 - 31 March 1530) Castellan of małogoszcz
- John Sienieński from Sienna and Gołogór (d. after 1526), Castellan of Kamieniec.
