= Mały Brzostek =

- Town
- Location within Poland
- Coordinates: 49°52′52″N 21°24′54″E
- Country: Crown of the Kingdom of Poland
- Voivodeship: Sandomierz Voivodeship
- Town rights: March 1, 1394
- Abandoned: c. 15th century

Area
  - Total: 25.9 km^{2} (10.0 sq mi)

Mały Brzostek [ˈmawɨ ˈbʐɔstɛk] is a lost royal town located mainly on the area of today's Nawsie Brzosteckie village, Poland. It was adjacent to medieval Brzostek, which belonged to the Benedictine abbey in Tyniec. Mały Brzostek received town privileges on 1 March 1394 from Władysław II Jagiełło, and Stanisław of Saspolin became the first wójt. Mały Brzostek was meant to compete with neighbouring Brzostek – since the town had good conditions for further development, the king hoped it would bring revenues to the royal treasury. Modern historians were unable to establish if the foundation was successful – as early as the 15th and 16th centuries Mały Brzostek stopped being mentioned in sources and became a suburb of Brzostek. The existence of two town charters, for Brzostek and Mały Brzostek, was the cause of numerous conflicts between wójts, and later between the burghers of Brzostek and the Benedictine Abbey of Tyniec, to which the city belonged.

== Location ==
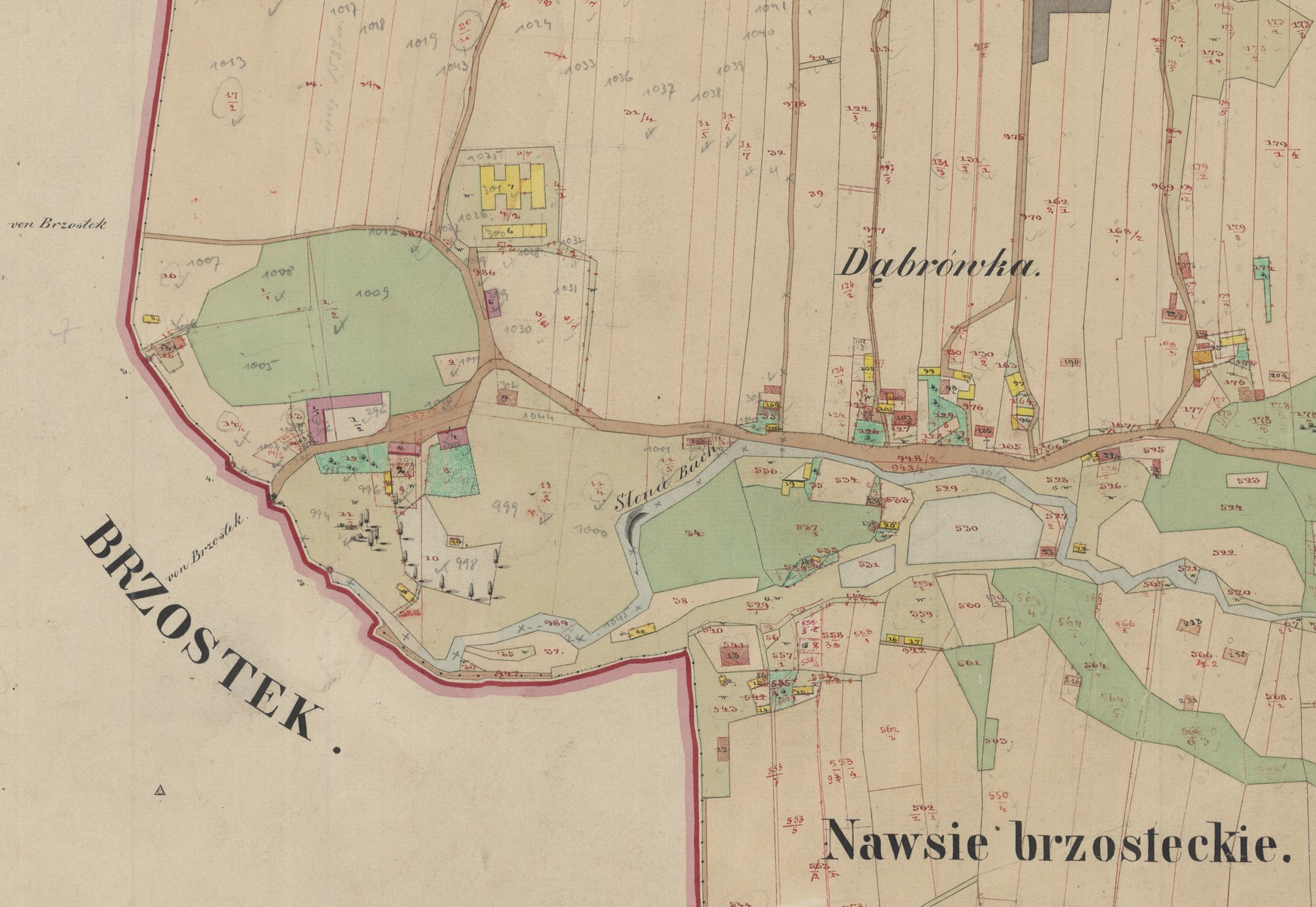
Buildings of a former wójt's folwark on a map from 1850

According to the town charter, Mały Brzostek was located "in Sandomierz Land by the Słona river", i.e. by the Słony brook, whose name still functions today. The stream has not changed its course since the Middle Ages, as evidenced by the steep slopes of its valley. Its streambed was modified in 19th century in the area of Równie and in the 1980s in the region of Legionów Street and Targowa Street in Brzostek, on the section from today's health center to the police station.

As stated in the Brzostek's town charter from 1367, the town was located by the Wisłoka river. That means Mały Brzostek had to be located more to the east. According to Prof. Bogdan Stanaszek, Słony stream may have been the border between the twin settlements. The area near today's health center in Brzostek (the intersection of Legionów and Mysłowskiego Streets) belonged to the wójt of Mały Brzostek, Stanisław of Saspolin. The wójt's folwark was located here, which was later owned by the Benedictines of Tyniec. A rebuilt classicist outbuilding of the former manor house has been preserved to this day.

The land which belonged to the wójt stretched as far as today's przysiółek Okrągła. The name of the Winnica hill, where grapes were grown, appears in documents. Stanaszek identifies it with the hill that separates the Brzostek neighborhood on Gryglewskiego Street from the stadium on Okrągła Street. The expansion of Maly Brzostek was meant to go east, through the then-forested valley of the Słony stream, towards Wola Brzostecka. This village was the closest settlement from this side, and appears in the sources for the first time in the 15th century. In 1407, the sołtys of Wola Brzostecka was the wójt of Mały Brzostek.

== Toponymy ==
The name of Mały Brzostek (translating to Little Brzostek or Lesser Brzostek), which was localized right next to monastic "greater" Brzostek, is characteristic of the Middle Ages. Two neighboring villages with different owners, being parts of the same settlement, were distinguished by adding the prefixes "Mały" and "Wielki" ("Lesser" and "Greater"). Examples include royal Tarnów Wielki and Tarnów Mały, which was a knight's property. The name of Brzostek itself, on the other hand, is derived from the word "brzost" meaning a species of elm.

== History ==
In the 12th and 13th centuries, the most important village in the region was Klecie, the property of the Benedictine Abbey of Tyniec, the sanctuary of St. Leonard, the economic center of the monastic domain and also the seat of the deanery in the 14th century. In 1353, however, Klecie, along with other surrounding villages, was taken from the Benedictines by King Casimir the Great, who granted them to the boyars for their merits in fighting in Ruthenia. As a result, Klecie lost its importance – Brzostek developed, and on June 18, 1367, it was granted town privileges by the Abbey of Tyniec.

Brzostek settlement was divided between two owners – the Abbey of Tyniec and the king. The royal part, named Mały Brzostek, was a village neighbouring the monastic town. On March 1, 1394, on the "esto mihi" Sunday, King Władysław Jagiełło issued a document in Kraków, in which he granted the wójtship of Mały Brzostek to Stanisław of Saspolin and allowed him to re-establish Mały Brzostek as a town. He was given the privilege of one tenth of the revenue from court fines and one sixth of the money from city taxes. He was, however, obligated to perform military service. The settlement was moved from the so-called Polish Law to Magdeburg Law – the burghers were to be tried by a town's court and the wójt. The charter bore the royal seal and the signatures of witnesses, important officials, including: the castellan of Kraków Dobiesław, Sędziwój of Kalisz, Spytek of Kraków, Jan Ligęza of Łęczyca, and the Great Crown Marshal Demetrius (Dymitr, who hailed from nearby Klecie).

Giving Mały Brzostek the town privileges was intended to stimulate competition and create a counterbalance to the monastic Brzostek. When granting Stanisław of Saspolin the privilege, the king expected income for the royal treasury – Brzostek had a good location on the route leading to Hungary, and the area was densely settled. The town's economy was to be based on trade and crafts. Every week, on Mondays, markets were to be held in Mały Brzostek, during which merchants and craftsmen (the town charter mentions clothiers, bakers, butchers, baths and mills) could freely sell all their goods – on other days, however, trade in the town was subject to severe restrictions.

The first wójt, Stanisław of Saspolin, described in the document as trustworthy and tirelessly faithful, was probably a royal courtier. According to one of the hypotheses, he was part of Queen Jadwiga's retinue, with whom he came to Poland from Hungary – however, Stanaszek considers it to be wrong. The name "Saspolin", which comes from 17th-century copies of the foundation charter, was most likely misread by copyists. Most likely, what was meant was the village of Sąspów. It was from this village that the family of wójts, mentioned in sources from the 14th to the 16th century, originated. As early as 1406 (or 1407) someone else is mentioned as the wójt of Mały Brzostek, a certain Klemens, perhaps the son of Stanisław.

In the charter, the king instructed Stanisław of Saspolin to demarcate for the new town 100 Franconian lans of land, corresponding to an area of about 25.9 km^{2}. He was to allocate two of the lans for a church, and another two for a pasture. The church itself most likely never came into existence; no mention of the existence of two churches in Brzostek survives in documents from the 15th century. Most likely, therefore, the land allocated for the church's construction was included in the property belonging to the Brzostek parish. The pasture, on the other hand, was probably located in the area known today as the błonia, where in the 20th century there was an SKR base in Nawsie Brzosteckie.

It is not known whether the establishment of the town was successful and whether the town competed, at least for a while, with the "greater" Brzostek. No documents have survived that mention the establishment of a town council or court in Mały Brzostek. There are also no traces of a market square, and the sources only mention a meadow, where the burghers traded cattle and horses. What is known, however, is that Mały Brzostek reached a certain stage of development as an independent urban settlement.

In the 15th-16th centuries, Mały Brzostek no longer appears in documents, while the term "Suburbium" or "Przedmieście" is introduced. Thus, the town was "absorbed" into monastic Brzostek. The suburb was recolonized after the invasion of George II Rakoczi's army in the 17th century, and the village of Nawsie Brzosteckie was founded on the territory of the former Mały Brzostek.

What remained of Mały Brzostek over the centuries was a separate Brzostek wójtship still appearing in 16th-century sources. The wójts of Mały Brzostek were also sołtyses of Wola Brzostecka. Two families with claims to the Brzostek wójtship, the Sąspowski family (later the Białowodzki family), probably the descendants of Stanisław of Saspolin, who came into possession of the wójtship in monastic Brzostek, and the Uchacz family, owned two separate wójtships with folwarks and associated landed estates. For several hundred years (from the time of the charter of Mały Brzostek until the 17th century), citing separate charters of the two different medieval towns, they fought heated court disputes with each other over the wójtship and the income it entailed. Around the middle of the 17th century, the entire wójtship belonged to the Abbey of Tyniec.

In 1758, town councillors in dispute with Abbot Bartoszewski, erroneously citing the charter of Mały Brzostek, attempted to challenge the Benedictines' right to govern Brzostek. The original document was burned during the invasion of the troops of Transylvanian Prince George II Rakoczi on March 19, 1657, while numerous copies survived. The townspeople accused the abbey of forging the charter of Brzostek. This thesis was still recognized by 19th-century historians Wojciech Kętrzyński and Stanisław Smolka in Kodeks dyplomatyczny klasztoru tynieckiego, as well as Marian Mysłowski, author of the book Dzieje miasta Brzostku. The version about the falsified document was undermined by a reviewer of the Kodeks book in the pages of the "Przegląd Krytyczny" in 1876. The authenticity of Brzostek monastery's 1367 location document was demonstrated only by Jerzy Wyrozumski in 1964.

== Bibliography ==
- Stanaszek, Bogdan (2007), "Z kart historii...", Brzostek: 640-lecie lokacji miasta (1367–2007). Tradycje – Perspektywy rozwoju (PDF) (in Polish), Brzostek: Towarzystwo Miłośników Ziemi Brzosteckiej i Urząd Gminy w Brzostku, pp. 37–53, ISBN 978-83-901833-9-8, archived from the original (PDF) on 2022-03-08
- Stanaszek, Bogdan (2008), "Mały Brzostek – miasto królewskie", Z dziejów Brzostku. Wydarzenia i ludzie (in Polish), Brzostek: Towarzystwo Miłośników Ziemi Brzosteckiej, pp. 24–30, ISBN 978-83-925845-0-6, OCLC 750747050
- Stanaszek, Bogdan (1997), Brzostek i okolice (PDF) (in Polish), Brzostek: Towarzystwo Miłośników Ziemi Brzosteckiej w Brzostku, ISBN 83-901833-3-1, archived from the original (PDF) on 2019-12-21
