= Nawsie Brzosteckie =

- Village
- Location within Poland
- Coordinates: 49°53′N 21°28′E
- Country: Poland
- Voivodeship: Subcarpathian
- County: Dębica
- Gmina: Brzostek
- Population: 1,100

Nawsie Brzosteckie [ˈnafɕɛ bʐɔsˈtɛt͡skʲɛ] is a village in the administrative district of Gmina Brzostek, within Dębica County, Subcarpathian Voivodeship, in south-eastern Poland.

It is located mainly on the area of the historic town called Mały Brzostek.
