= Kazimierz Moskal (politician) =

Polish politician (born 1962)

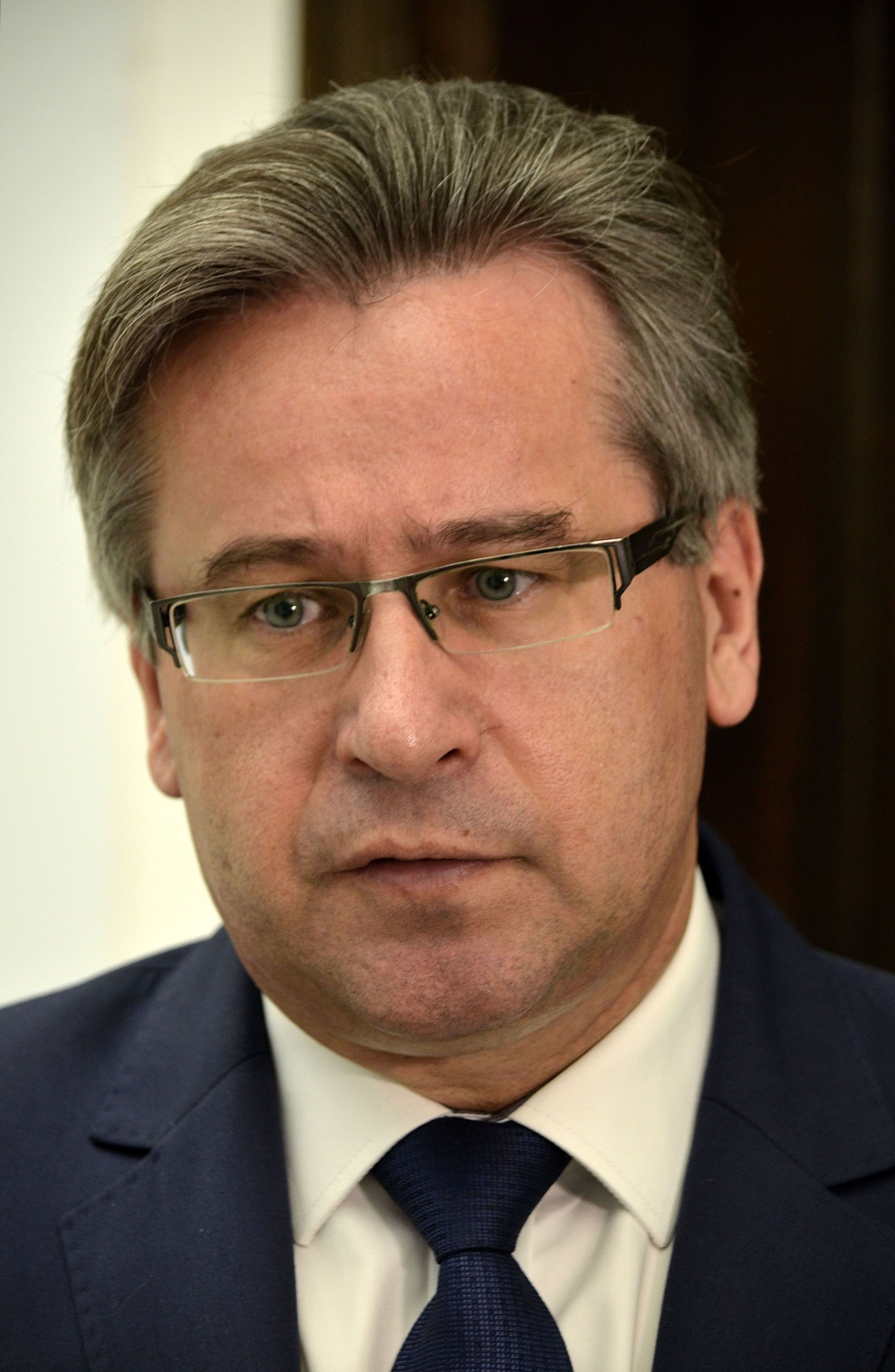

member of Sejm
- In office 25 September 2005 – incumbent

Personal details
- Born: 2 February 1962 (age 64) Żyraków, Poland
- Party: Law and Justice

Kazimierz Marian Moskal (born 2 February 1962) is a Polish politician. He was elected to Sejm on 25 September 2005, getting 9541 votes in 23 Rzeszów district as a candidate from the Law and Justice list.

== See also ==
- Members of Polish Sejm 2005-2007
