= Mokre, Dębica County =

Mokre
- Village
- Location within Poland
- Coordinates: 50°7′56″N 21°22′2″E
- Country: Poland
- Voivodeship: Subcarpathian
- County: Dębica
- Gmina: Żyraków
- Population: 590

Mokre [ˈmɔkrɛ] is a village in the administrative district of Gmina Żyraków, within Dębica County, Subcarpathian Voivodeship, in south-eastern Poland.
