= Nagoszyn =

- Village
- Location within Poland
- Coordinates: 50°8′24″N 21°24′13″E
- Country: Poland
- Voivodeship: Subcarpathian
- County: Dębica
- Gmina: Żyraków
- Population: 1,600

Nagoszyn [naˈɡɔʂɨn] is a village in the administrative district of Gmina Żyraków, within Dębica County, Subcarpathian Voivodeship, in south-eastern Poland.
