= Wiewiórka, Podkarpackie Voivodeship =

Wiewiórka
- Village
- Location within Poland
- Coordinates: 50°6′33″N 21°20′1″E
- Country: Poland
- Voivodeship: Subcarpathian
- County: Dębica
- Gmina: Żyraków

Wiewiórka [vjɛˈvjurka] is a village in the administrative district of Gmina Żyraków, within Dębica County, Subcarpathian Voivodeship, in south-eastern Poland.
