= Pasmo Brzanki Landscape Park =

Protected area in Poland

Coordinates: 49.8531°N 21.1652°E

- Park Krajobrazowy Pasma Brzanki
- IUCN category V (protected landscape/seascape)
- Interactive map of Pasmo Brzanki Landscape Park
- Location: south Poland
- Established: 1995

Pasmo Brzanki Landscape Park (Park Krajobrazowy Pasma Brzanki) is a protected area (Landscape Park) in southern Poland, established in 1995.

The Park is shared between two voivodeships: Lesser Poland Voivodeship and Subcarpathian Voivodeship. Within Lesser Poland Voivodeship it lies in Tarnów County (Gmina Gromnik, Gmina Ryglice, Gmina Rzepiennik Strzyżewski, Gmina Tuchów, Gmina Szerzyny). Within Subcarpathian Voivodeship it lies in Dębica County (Gmina Jodłowa) and Jasło County (Gmina Brzyska, Gmina Skołyszyn).

Within the Landscape Park are four nature reserves.
