= Bobrowa Wola =

- Village
- Location within Poland
- Coordinates: 50°8′7″N 21°27′29″E
- Country: Poland
- Voivodeship: Subcarpathian
- County: Dębica
- Gmina: Żyraków

Bobrowa Wola [bɔˈbrɔva ˈvɔla] is a village in the administrative district of Gmina Żyraków, within Dębica County, Subcarpathian Voivodeship, in south-eastern Poland.
