= Bobrowa, Podkarpackie Voivodeship =

Bobrowa
- Village
- Location within Poland
- Coordinates: 50°6′59″N 21°25′53″E
- Country: Poland
- Voivodeship: Subcarpathian
- County: Dębica
- Gmina: Żyraków
- Population: 1,390

Bobrowa [bɔˈbrɔva] is a village in the administrative district of Gmina Żyraków, within Dębica County, Subcarpathian Voivodeship, in south-eastern Poland.
