= Głobikówka =

- Village
- Location within Poland
- Coordinates: 49°57′N 21°27′E
- Country: Poland
- Voivodeship: Subcarpathian
- County: Dębica
- Gmina: Brzostek
- Population: 230

Głobikówka [ɡwɔbiˈkufka] is a village in the administrative district of Gmina Brzostek, within Dębica County, Subcarpathian Voivodeship, in south-eastern Poland.
