= Battle of Dęborzyn =

War of the Bar Confederation battle

- Part of War of the Bar Confederation
Date	15 May 1770
Location	Dęborzyn
Result	Russian victory

Belligerents
Bar Confederation	(Russia) Russian Empire

Commanders and leaders
Casimir Pulaski	(Russia) Alexander Suvorov

Strength
1,200	Unknown

Casualties and losses
200 killed	Unknown

Battle of Dęborzyn - a battle fought on 15 May 1770, during the Bar Confederation in the area of the village of Dęborzyn near Pilzno.

The battle took place during a sortie towards Tarnów, carried out by Kazimierz Pułaski at the head of a cavalry unit of 1,200 people. The Confederation took up positions near Dęborzyn, on a hill to which the road led through the ravine. The clash took place on Pułaski's initiative, without consultation with the Confederation's leadership. During the battle with Russian troops, 200 Bar Confederates died. The defeat had a negative impact on Kazimierz Pułaski, which he expressed in the report. In response, the command stated that the defeat "does not diminish (...) in any way the respect, and bravery of His Lordship".
