= Kamienica Dolna =

- Village
- Location within Poland
- Coordinates: 49°54′40″N 21°20′59″E
- Country: Poland
- Voivodeship: Subcarpathian
- County: Dębica
- Gmina: Brzostek

Kamienica Dolna [kamjɛˈnit͡sa ˈdɔlna] is a village in the administrative district of Gmina Brzostek, within Dębica County, Subcarpathian Voivodeship, in south-eastern Poland.
