= Zawierzbie, Podkarpackie Voivodeship =

Zawierzbie
- Village
- Location within Poland
- Coordinates: 50°4′38″N 21°22′54″E
- Country: Poland
- Voivodeship: Subcarpathian
- County: Dębica
- Gmina: Żyraków
- Population: 781
- Website: http://zawierzbie.rox.pl

Zawierzbie [zaˈvjɛʐbjɛ] is a village in the administrative district of Gmina Żyraków, within Dębica County, Subcarpathian Voivodeship, in south-eastern Poland.
