= Wola Żyrakowska =

- Village
- Location within Poland
- Coordinates: 50°6′N 21°25′E
- Country: Poland
- Voivodeship: Subcarpathian
- County: Dębica
- Gmina: Żyraków

Wola Żyrakowska [ˈvɔla ʐɨraˈkɔfska] is a village in the administrative district of Gmina Żyraków, within Dębica County, Subcarpathian Voivodeship, in south-eastern Poland.
