= Zagórze, Dębica County =

Zagórze
- Village
- Location within Poland
- Coordinates: 49°55′N 21°18′E
- Country: Poland
- Voivodeship: Subcarpathian
- County: Dębica
- Gmina: Jodłowa
- Time zone: UTC+1 (CET)
  - Summer (DST): UTC+2 (CEST)
- Vehicle registration: RDE

Zagórze [zaˈɡuʐɛ] is a village in the administrative district of Gmina Jodłowa, within Dębica County, Subcarpathian Voivodeship, in south-eastern Poland.
