= Wola Wielka, Dębica County =

Wola Wielka
- Village
- Location within Poland
- Coordinates: 50°4′45″N 21°20′44″E
- Country: Poland
- Voivodeship: Subcarpathian
- County: Dębica
- Gmina: Żyraków

Wola Wielka (Polish pronunciation: [ˈvɔla ˈvjɛlka]) is a village in the administrative district of Gmina Żyraków, within Dębica County, Subcarpathian Voivodeship, in south-eastern Poland.
