= Korzeniów =

Korzeniów may refer to the following places in Poland:

- Korzeniów, Podkarpackie Voivodeship
- Korzeniów, Lublin Voivodeship
