= Kowalowa =

Kowalowa may refer to the following places in Poland:

- Kowalowa, Lower Silesian Voivodeship (south-west Poland)
- Kowalowa, Lesser Poland Voivodeship (south Poland)
