= Przeczyca =

- Village
- Location within Poland
- Coordinates: 49°54′N 21°22′E
- Country: Poland
- Voivodeship: Subcarpathian
- County: Dębica
- Gmina: Brzostek
- Population: 750

Przeczyca [pʂɛˈt͡ʂɨt͡sa] is a village in the administrative district of Gmina Brzostek, within Dębica County, Subcarpathian Voivodeship, in south-eastern Poland.
