= Gmina Brzostek =

Gmina Brzostek Brzostek Commune
- Gmina
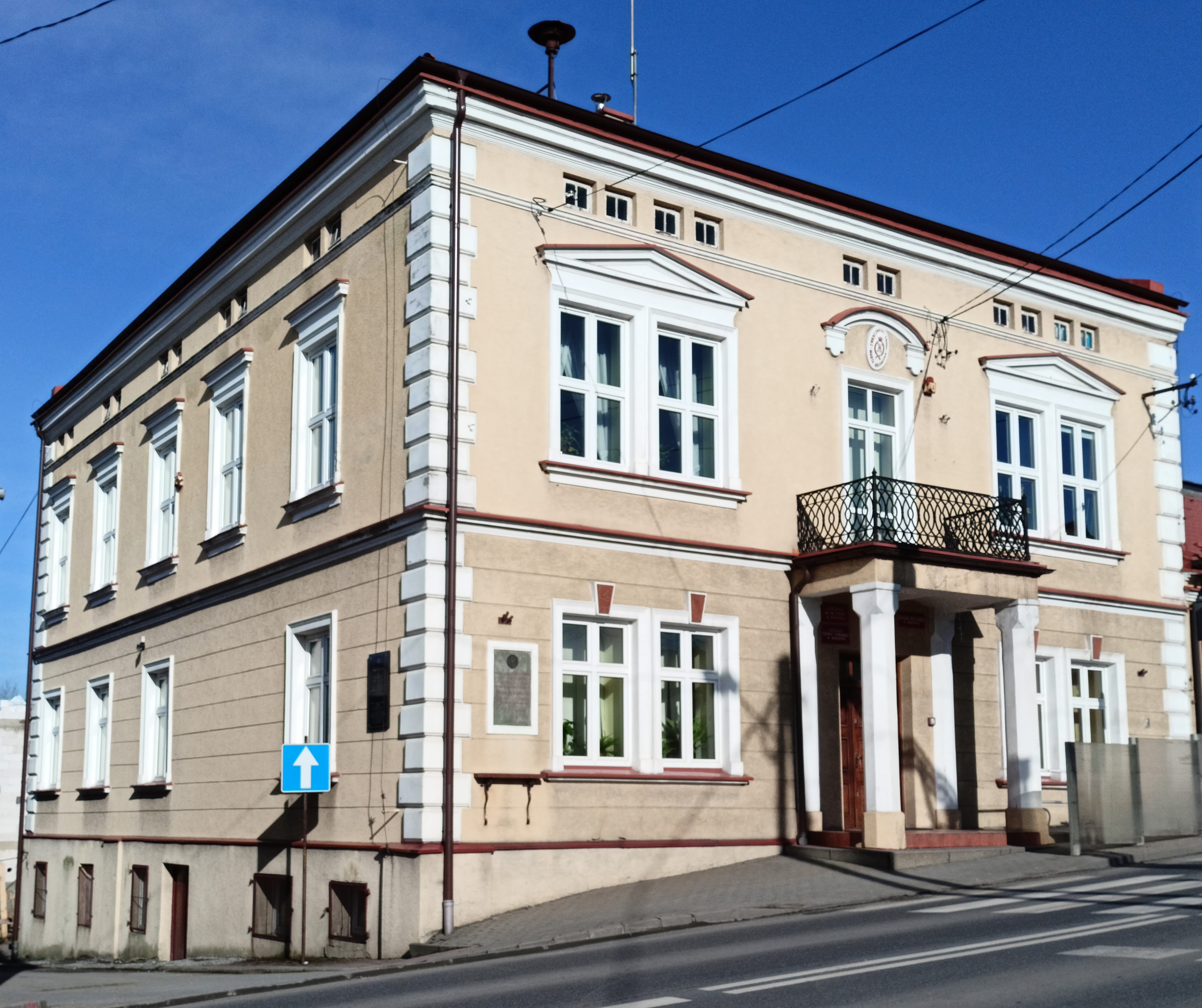
- Gmina office in Brzostek

- Coat of arms

- Location within Poland
- Coordinates (Brzostek): 49°52′56″N 21°24′26″E
- Country: Poland
- Voivodeship: Subcarpathian
- County: Dębica
- Seat: Brzostek

Area
  - Total: 122.62 km^{2} (47.34 sq mi)

Population (2006)
  - Total: 13,022
  - Density: 106.20/km^{2} (275.05/sq mi)
- Time zone: UTC+1 (CET)
  - Summer (DST): UTC+2 (CEST)
- Vehicle registration: RDE
- Website: https://brzostek.pl/

Gmina Brzostek is an urban-rural gmina (administrative district) in Dębica County, Subcarpathian Voivodeship, in south-eastern Poland. Its seat is the town of Brzostek.

The gmina covers an area of 122.62 square kilometres (47.3 sq mi), and as of 2006 its total population is 13,022, out of which the population of Brzostek is 2,597.

The gmina contains part of the protected area called Czarnorzeki-Strzyżów Landscape Park.

Brzostek regained town status on 1 January 2009 – prior to that the district was classed as a rural gmina.

== Villages ==
Apart from the town of Brzostek, the gmina contains the villages and settlements of Bączałka, Bukowa, Głobikówka, Gorzejowa, Grudna Dolna, Grudna Górna, Januszkowice, Kamienica Dolna, Kamienica Górna, Klecie, Nawsie Brzosteckie, Opacionka, Przeczyca, Siedliska-Bogusz, Skurowa, Smarżowa, Wola Brzostecka and Zawadka Brzostecka.

== Neighbouring gminas ==
Gmina Brzostek is bordered by the gminas of Brzyska, Dębica, Frysztak, Jodłowa, Kołaczyce, Pilzno, Ropczyce and Wielopole Skrzyńskie.
