= Ryglice =

Town in Poland

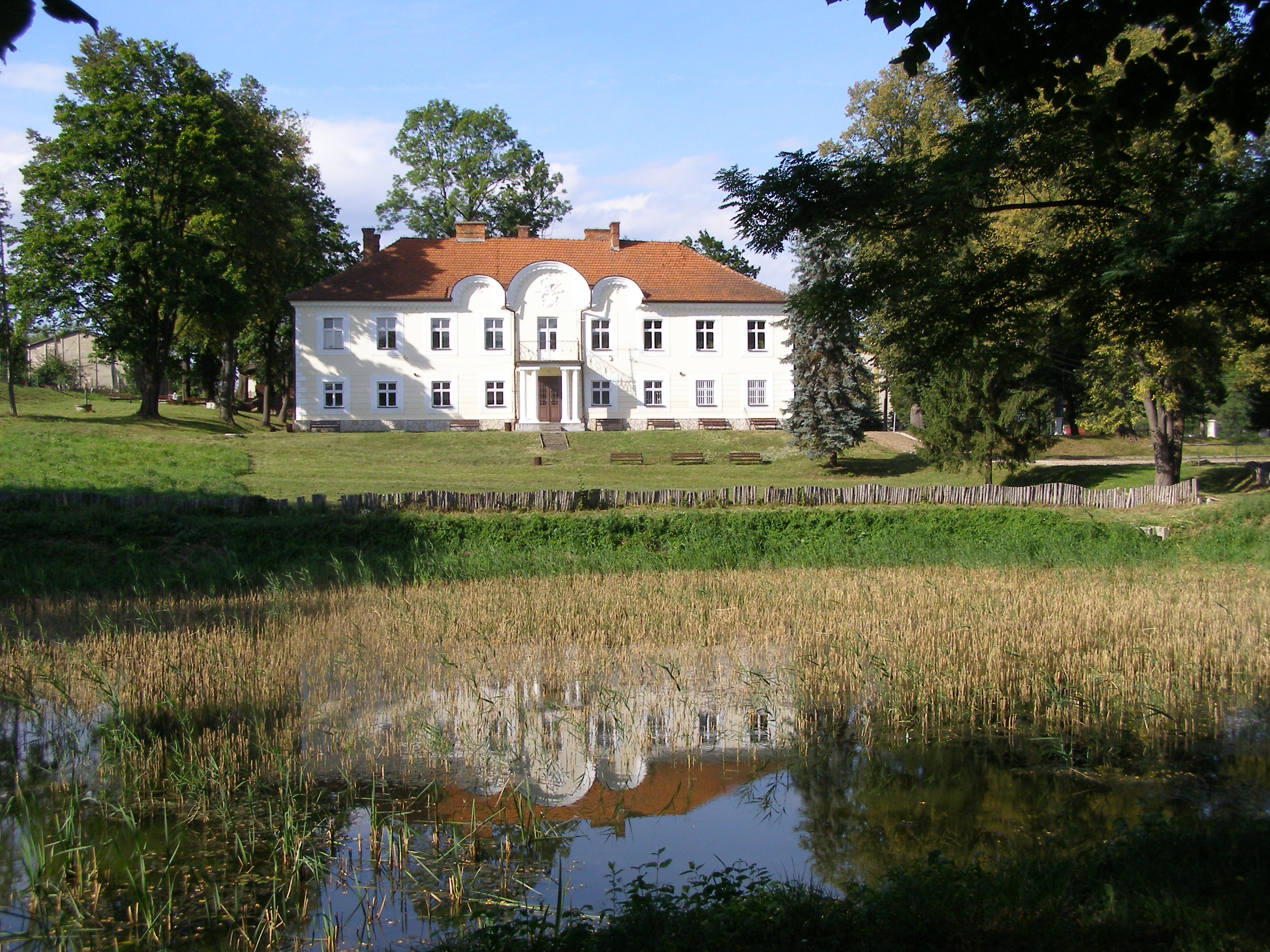
- The Palace and the grand park

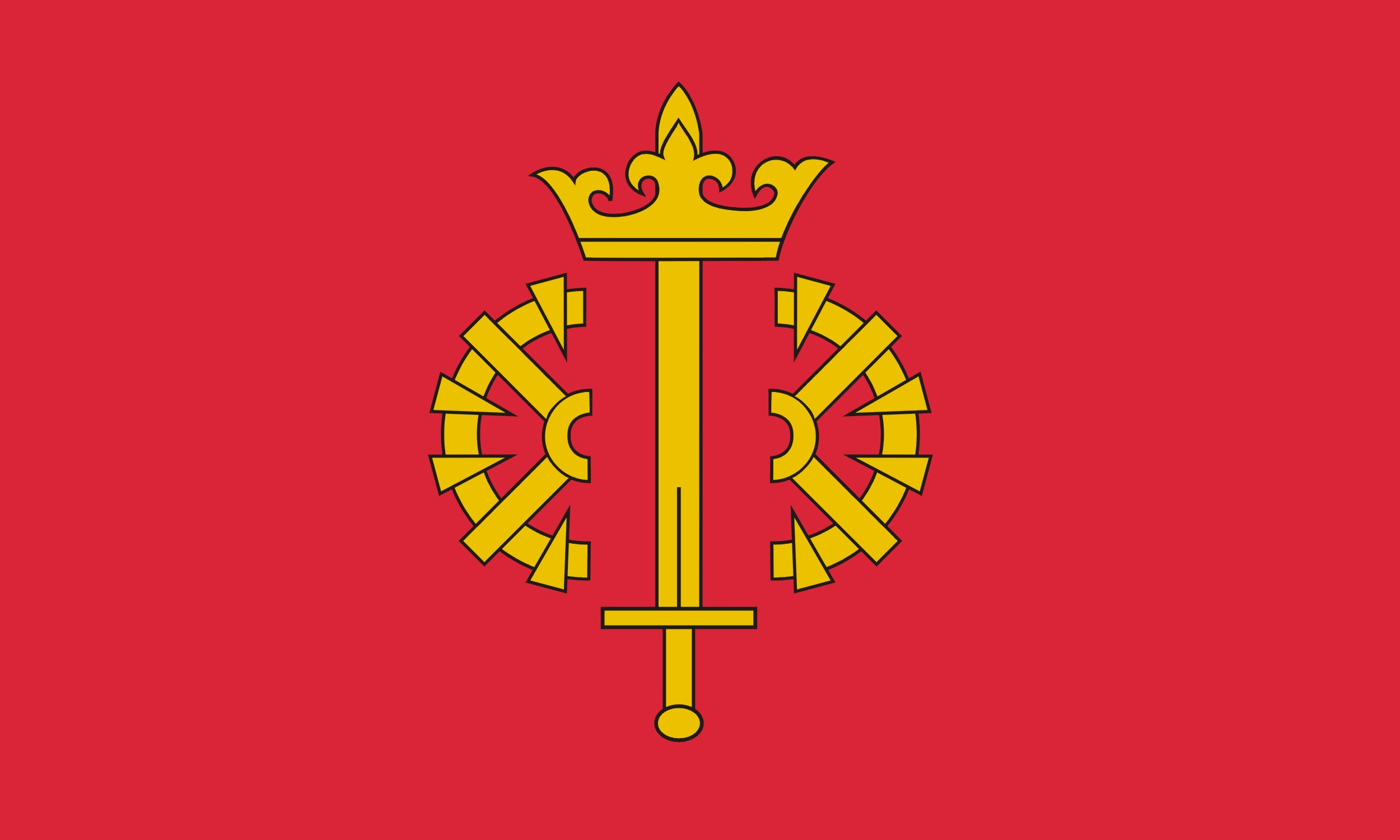
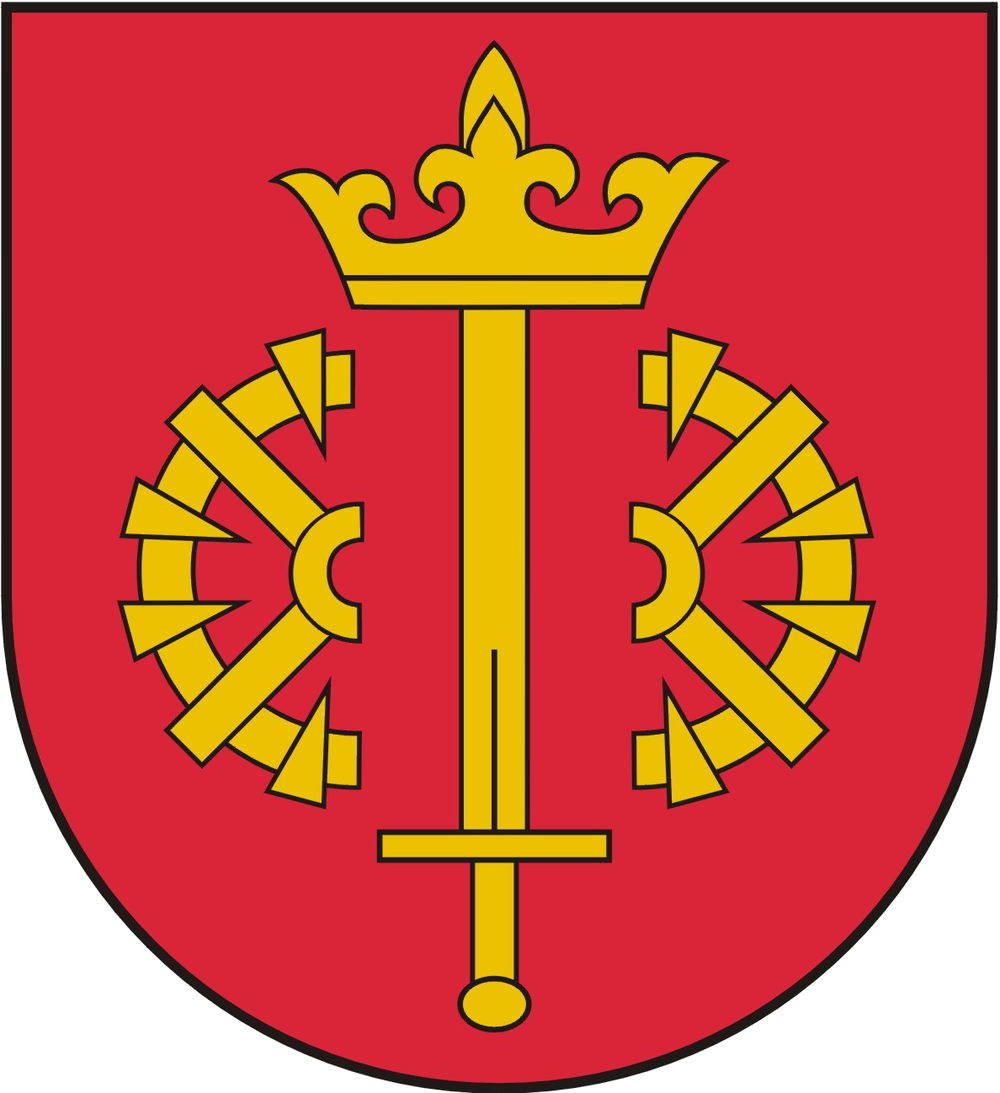
- Flag Coat of arms

- Location within Poland
- Coordinates: 49°53′N 21°8′E
- Country: Poland
- Voivodeship: Lesser Poland
- County: Tarnów
- Gmina: Ryglice
- Town rights: 1824

Government
  - Mayor: Paweł Augustyn

Area
  - Total: 25.08 km^{2} (9.68 sq mi)

Population (2007)
  - Total: 2,811
  - Density: 112.1/km^{2} (290.3/sq mi)
- Time zone: UTC+1 (CET)
  - Summer (DST): UTC+2 (CEST)
- Postal code: 33–160
- Car plates: KTA
- Website: http://www.ryglice.pl

Ryglice [rɨɡˈlʲit͡sɛ] is a town in Lesser Poland Voivodeship, Tarnów County, the seat of the urban-rural gmina Ryglice. It is located about 30 kilometres (19 miles) from Tarnów, near the town of Tuchów, and had town privileges in 1824–1934, and from 2001. On 30 June 2007, the population of the town was 2,811.

== Information ==
Ryglice is a local road junction, with three roads meeting here. The town does not have a rail station, and the nearest one is located in Tuchów. It has a sports club (KS Ryglice), with men's football and volleyball departments. Among historic buildings worth visiting is the church from 1940 with antique equipment and a vicarage, palace and a granary all dating back to the 18th century. Recently Ryglice became famous for the controversial "monument of Emigration", which was established at the initiative of the Mayor of Ryglice Bernard Karasiewicz.

== History ==
First documented mention of Ryglice comes from the year 1301, when Duke and later King Władysław I the Elbow-high allowed local noblemen Władysław Burza and Wawrzyniec Kielanowski to own the village. Ryglice prospered during the reign of Casimir III the Great, but it did not receive a town charter, remaining a village. Wars of the 17th century, such as the Swedish invasion of Poland, devastated Ryglice. In 1656, a skirmish between Polish and Swedish soldiers took place here, after which the local stream was called Szwedka (literally meaning Swede). Following the First Partition of Poland, Ryglice was annexed by the Habsburg Empire, as part of Galicia (1772–1918). Local peasants actively participated in the Galician slaughter, murdering members of the nobility. In November 1914, during World War I, the village was captured by the Russians, who remained here until May 1915. There are several World War I military cemeteries in the area of Ryglice.

During World War II, Ryglice's Jewish community was murdered by the Germans in the Holocaust. In 1940, the Germans burned the synagogue, and in late 1944/early 1945, most of the village, together with the town hall, three bridges, and 18th century buildings, was burned by the Germans, who retreated on January 17, 1945.

Between 1975 and 1998, Ryglice administratively belonged to Tarnów Voivodeship.

== Gallery ==
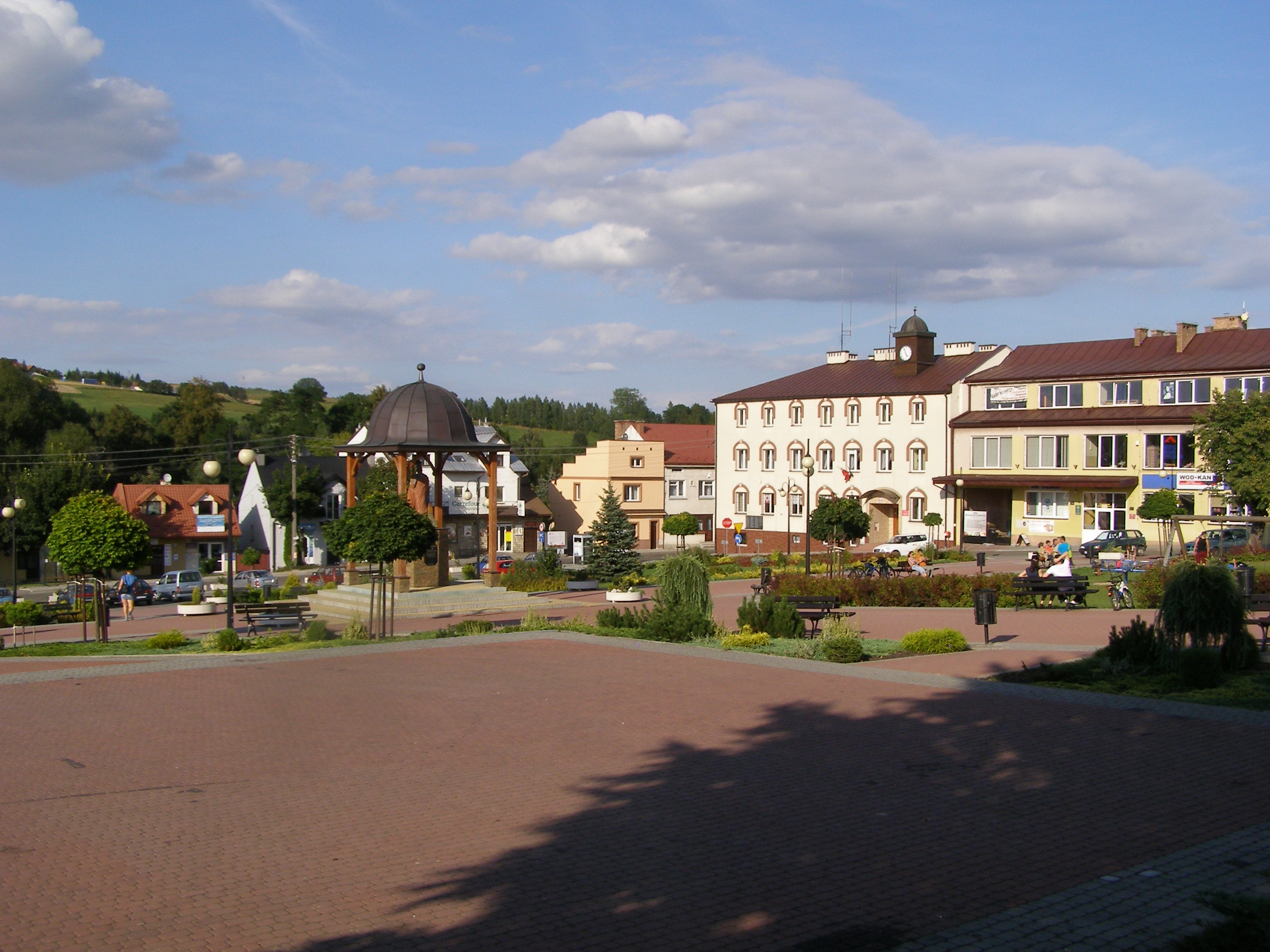
Rynek - Historic Marketplace

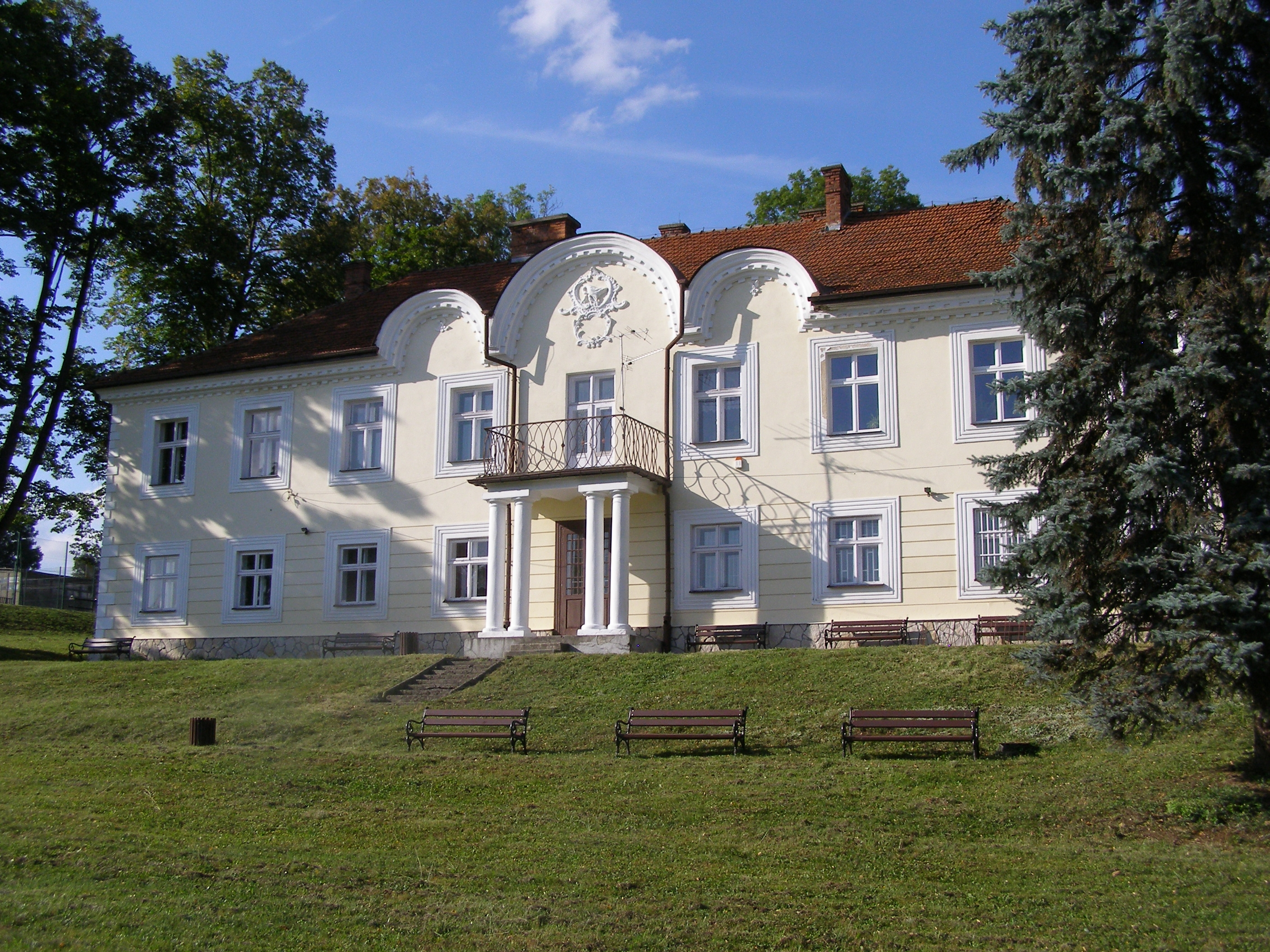
An 18th-century palace

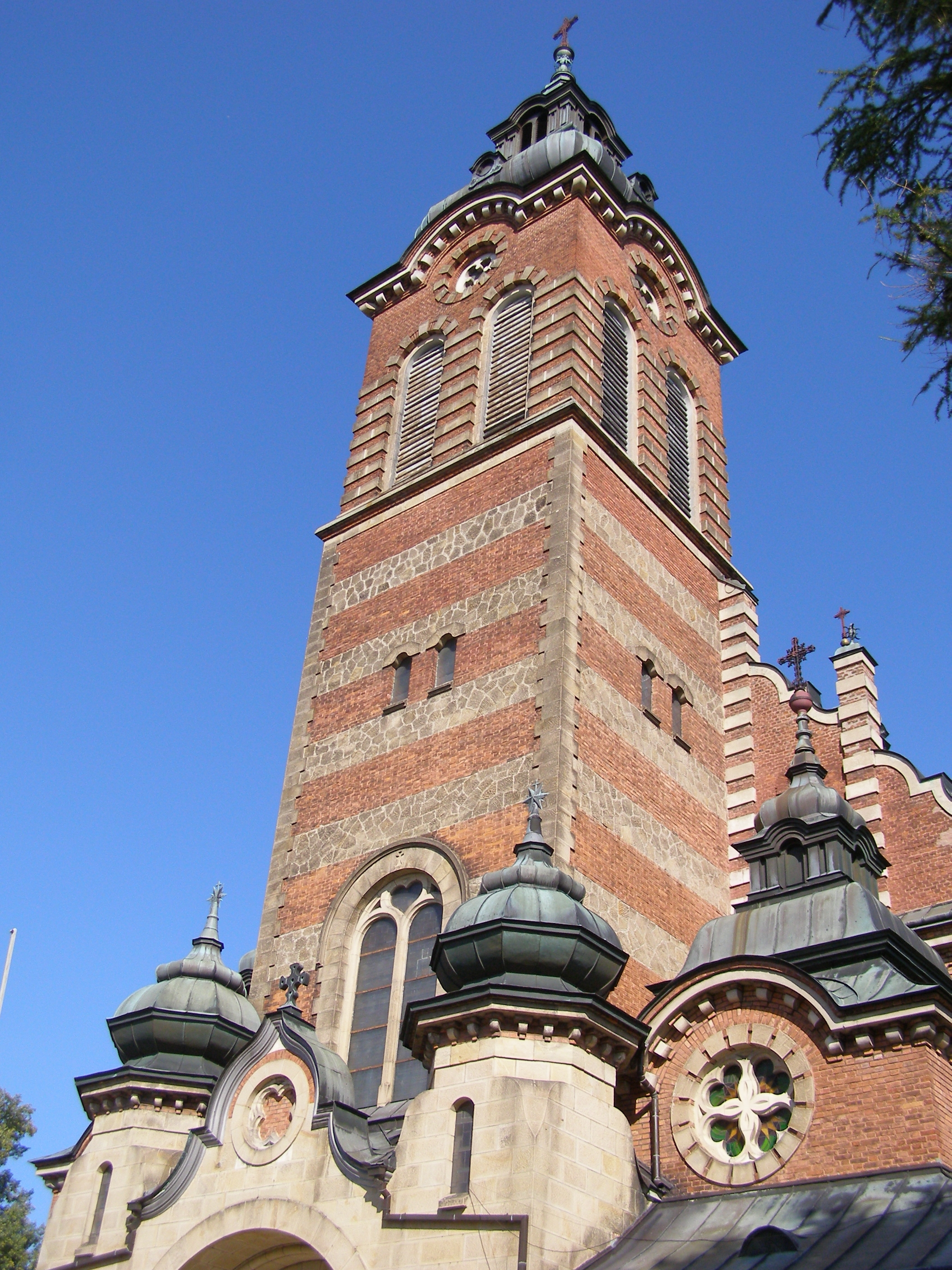
Church

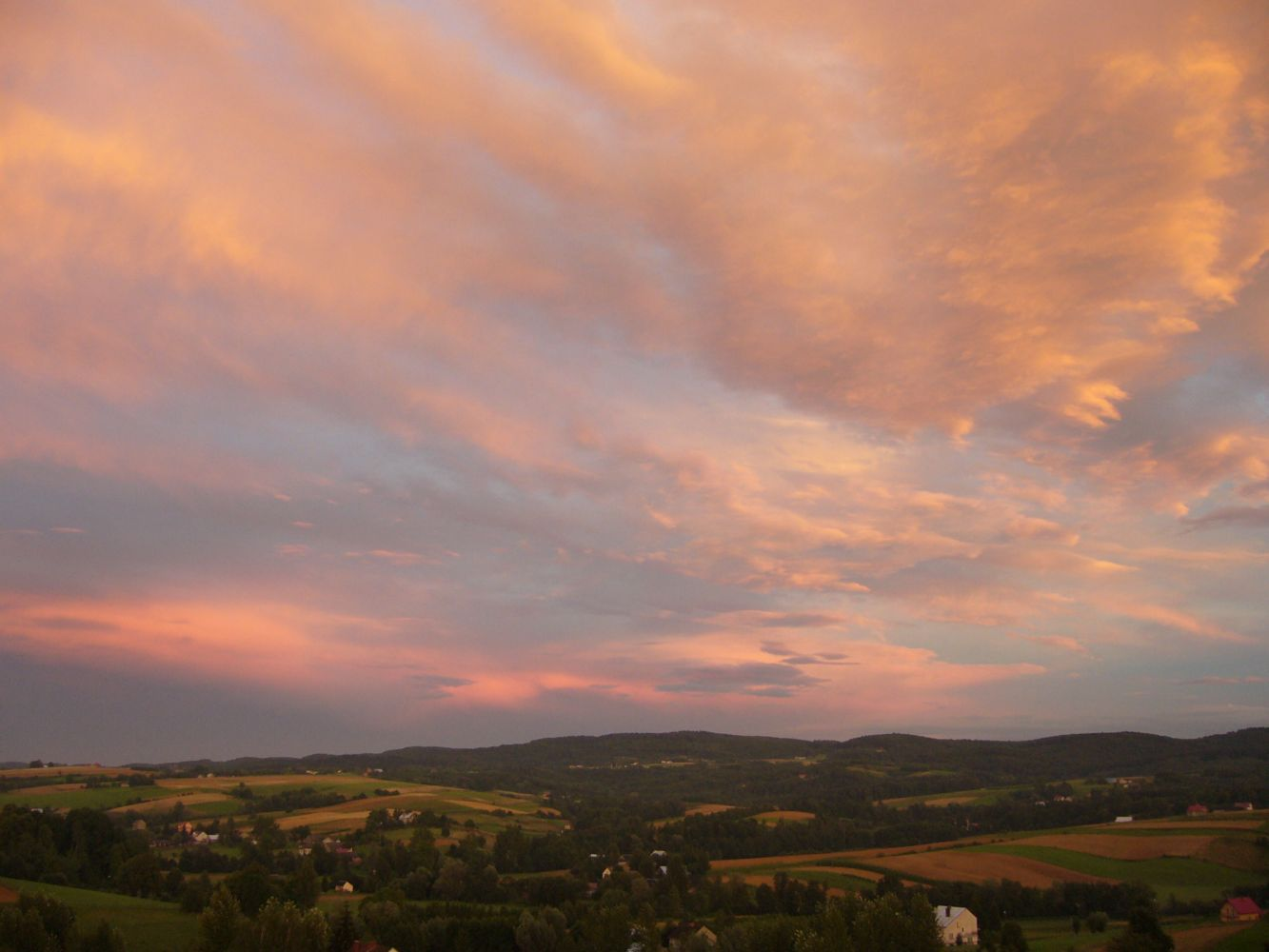
Panorama of the village

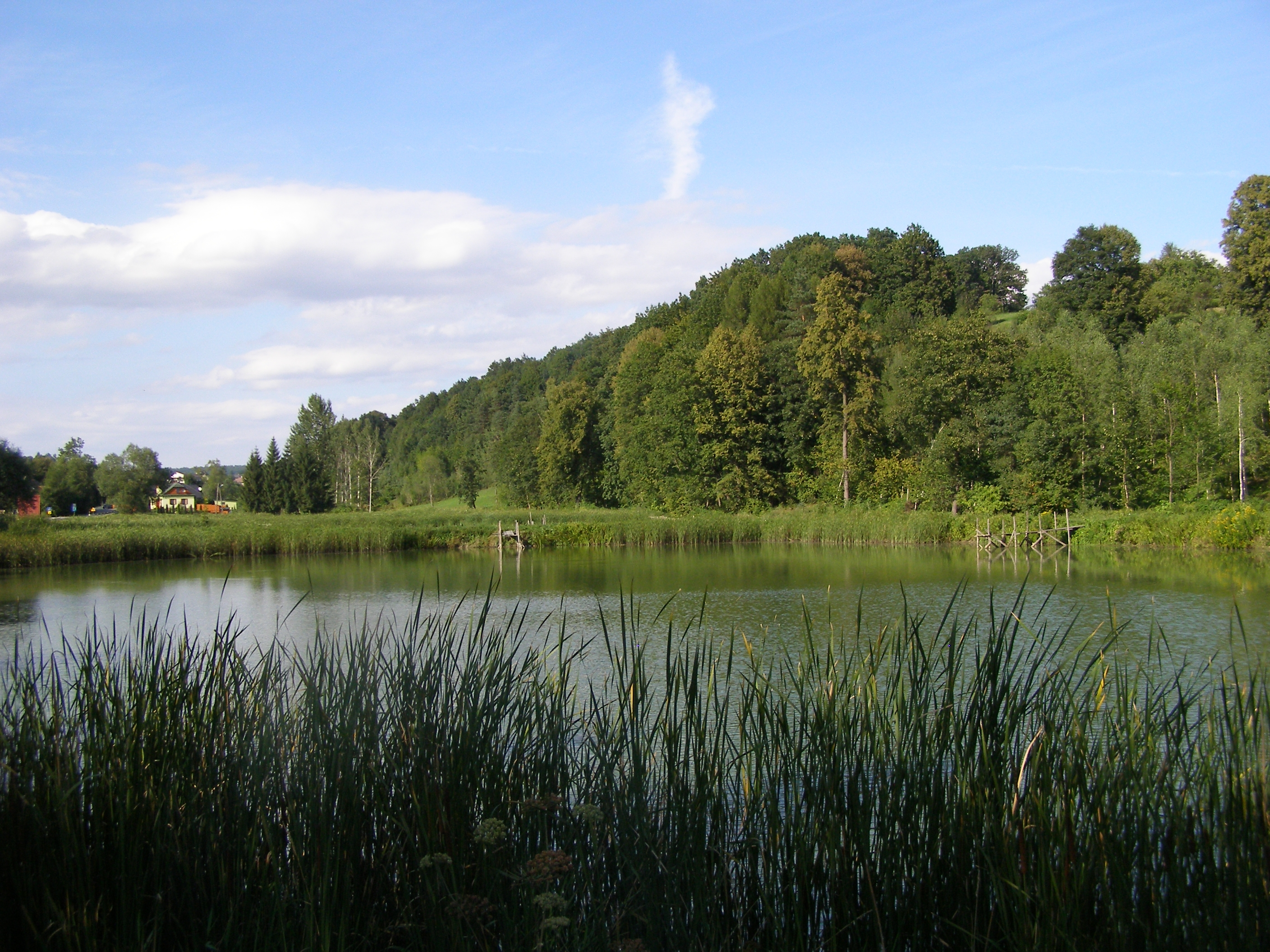
Lake

== External links and sources ==
- Jewish Community in Ryglice on Virtual Shtetl
- Jewish cemetery in Ryglice on Old Cemeteries
