= Lubcza, Lesser Poland Voivodeship =

Lubcza
- Village
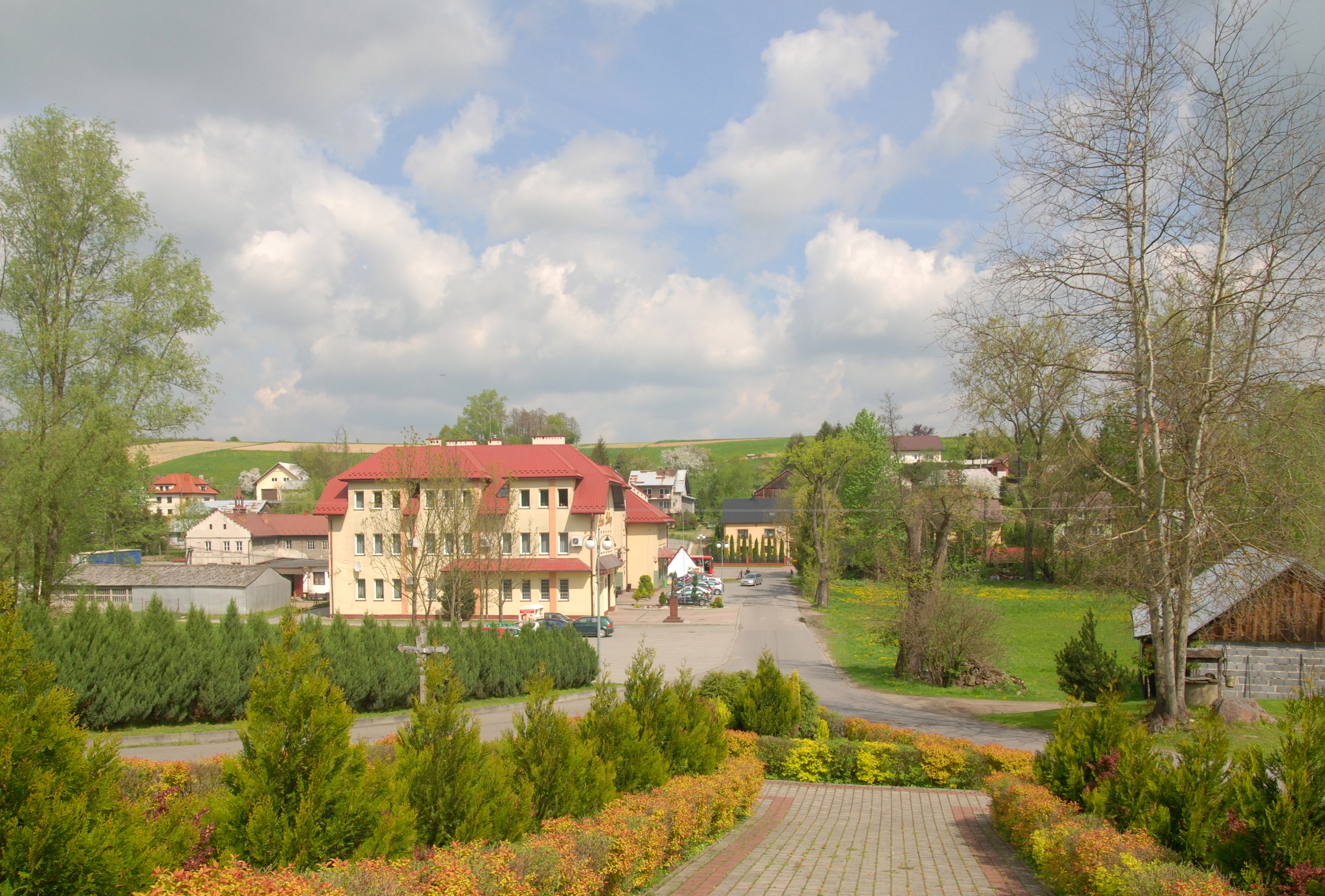
- Center of the village

- Location within Poland
- Coordinates: 49°54′N 21°16′E
- Country: Poland
- Voivodeship: Lesser Poland
- County: Tarnów
- Gmina: Ryglice

Population
  - Total: 3,000

Lubcza [ˈlupt͡ʂa] is a village in the administrative district of Gmina Ryglice, within Tarnów County, Lesser Poland Voivodeship, in southern Poland.
