= Zalasowa =

- Village
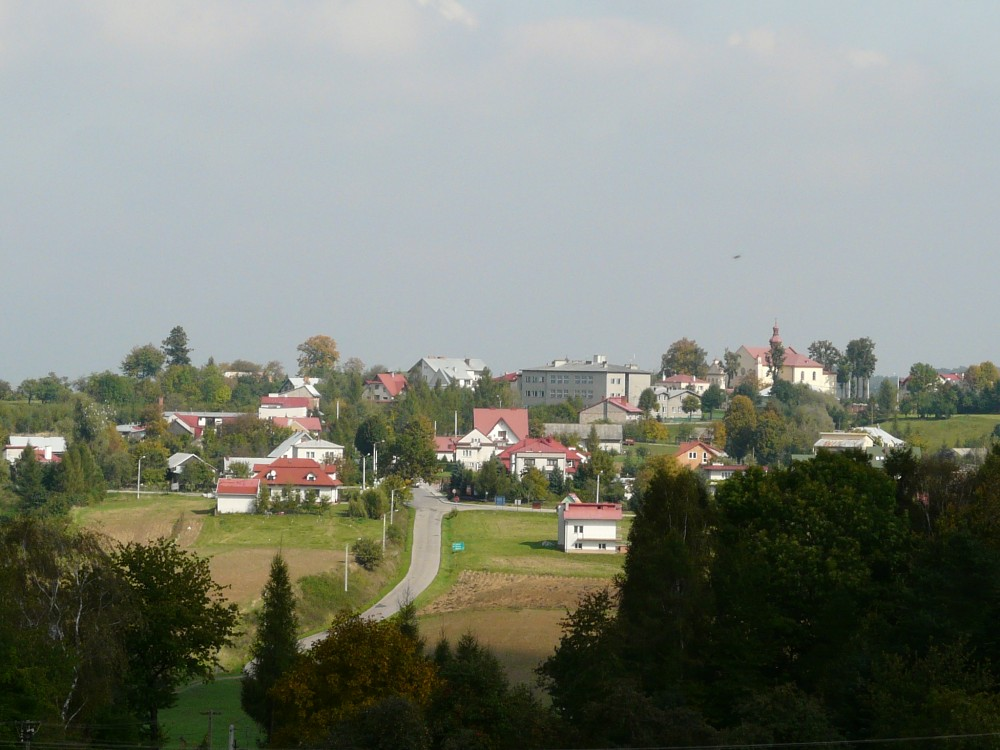

- Location within Poland
- Coordinates: 49°56′N 21°8′E
- Country: Poland
- Voivodeship: Lesser Poland
- County: Tarnów
- Gmina: Ryglice

Zalasowa [zalaˈsɔva] is a village in the administrative district of Gmina Ryglice, within Tarnów County, Lesser Poland Voivodeship, in southern Poland.
