= Wola Lubecka, Lesser Poland Voivodeship =

Wola Lubecka
- Village
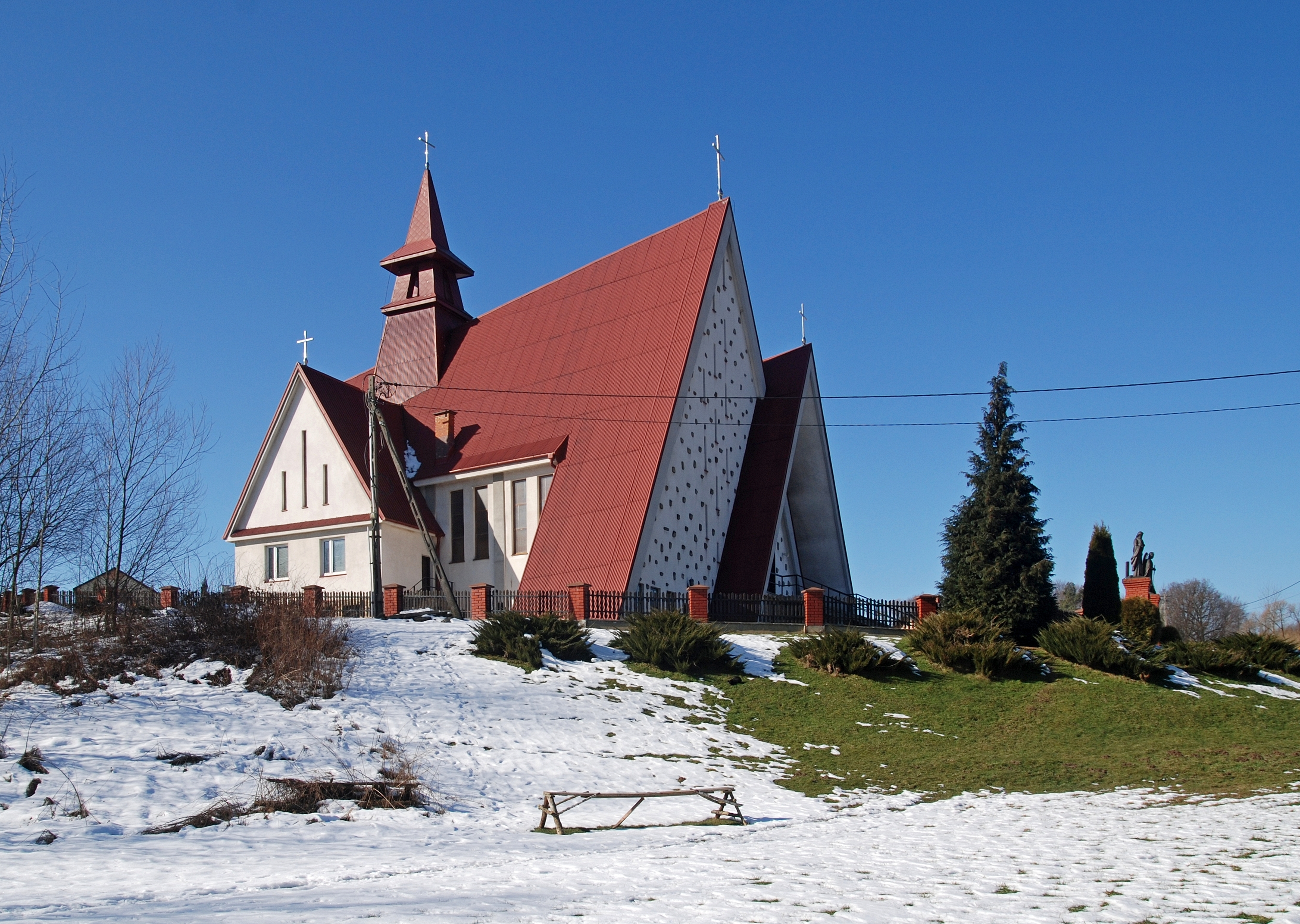
- Catholic church

- Location within Poland
- Coordinates: 49°55′N 21°11′E
- Country: Poland
- Voivodeship: Lesser Poland
- County: Tarnów
- Gmina: Ryglice
- Population: 862

Wola Lubecka [ˈvɔla luˈbɛt͡ska] is a village in the administrative district of Gmina Ryglice, within Tarnów County, Lesser Poland Voivodeship, in southern Poland.
