= Dęborzyn =

- Village
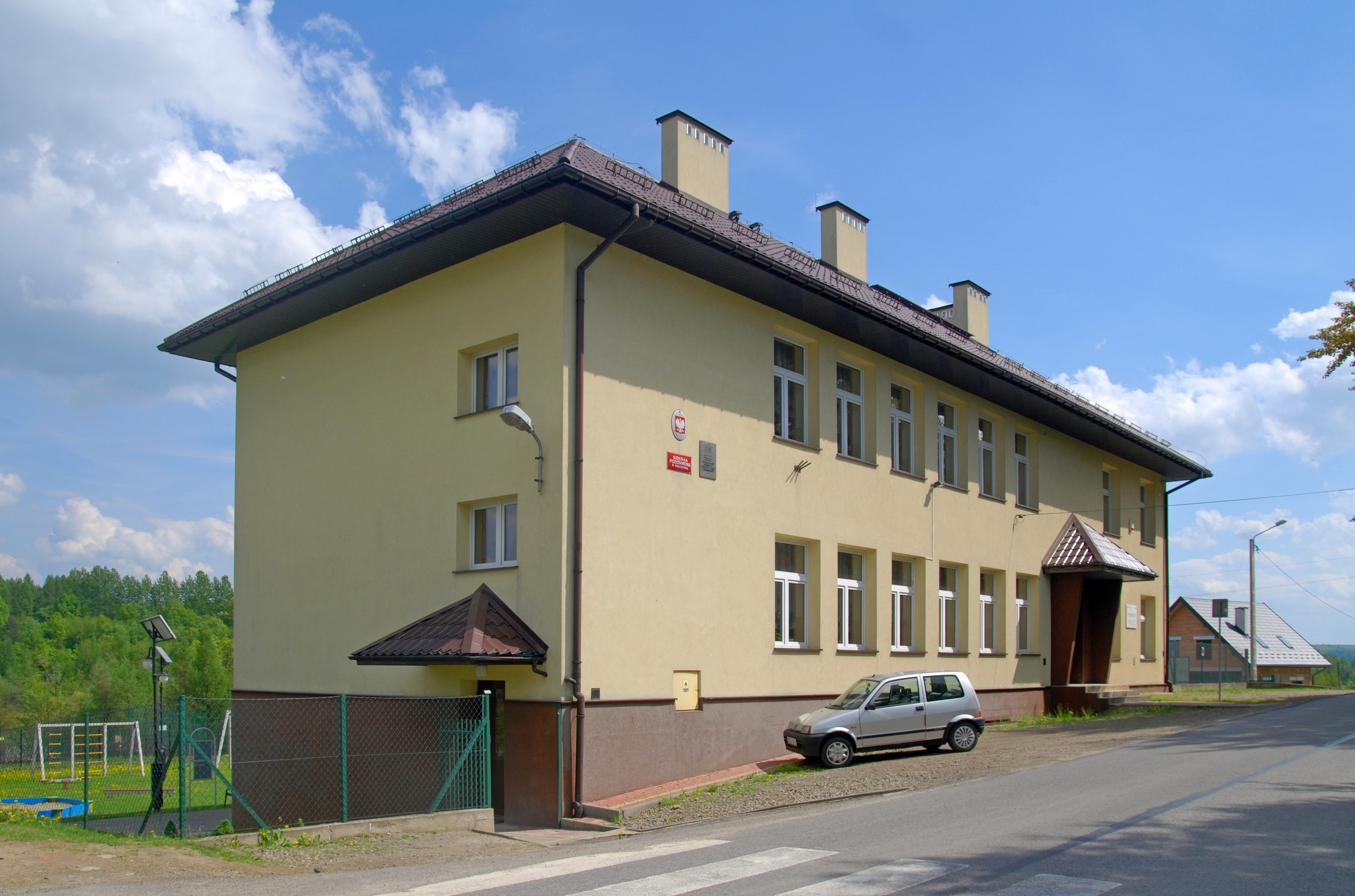
- Elementary school

- Location within Poland
- Coordinates: 49°55′N 21°20′E
- Country: Poland
- Voivodeship: Subcarpathian
- County: Dębica
- Gmina: Jodłowa
- Time zone: UTC+1 (CET)
  - Summer (DST): UTC+2 (CEST)
- Vehicle registration: RDE

Dęborzyn [dɛmˈbɔʐɨn] is a village in the administrative district of Gmina Jodłowa, within Dębica County, Subcarpathian Voivodeship, in south-eastern Poland.

Four Polish citizens were murdered by Nazi Germany in the village during World War II.
