= Uniszowa =

- Village
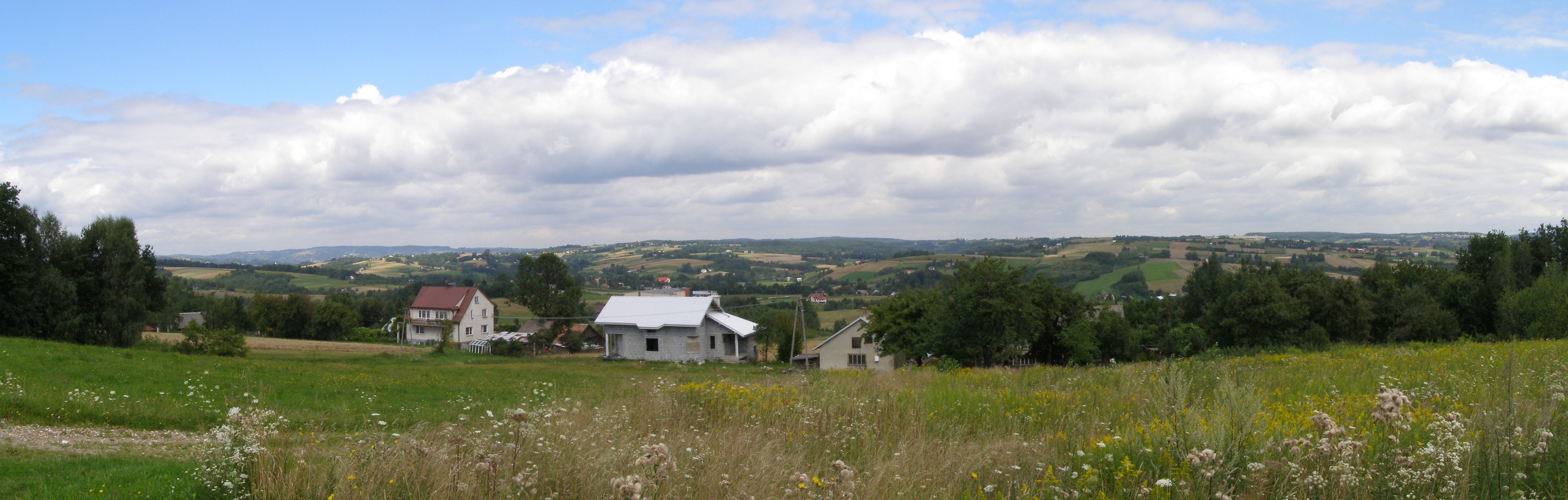

- Location within Poland
- Coordinates: 49°53′N 21°7′E
- Country: Poland
- Voivodeship: Lesser Poland
- County: Tarnów
- Gmina: Ryglice

Uniszowa [uniˈʂɔva] is a village in the administrative district of Gmina Ryglice, within Tarnów County, Lesser Poland Voivodeship, in southern Poland.

In the years 1975–1998 the town administratively belonged to the Tarnów Voivodeship.
