= Bistuszowa =

- Village
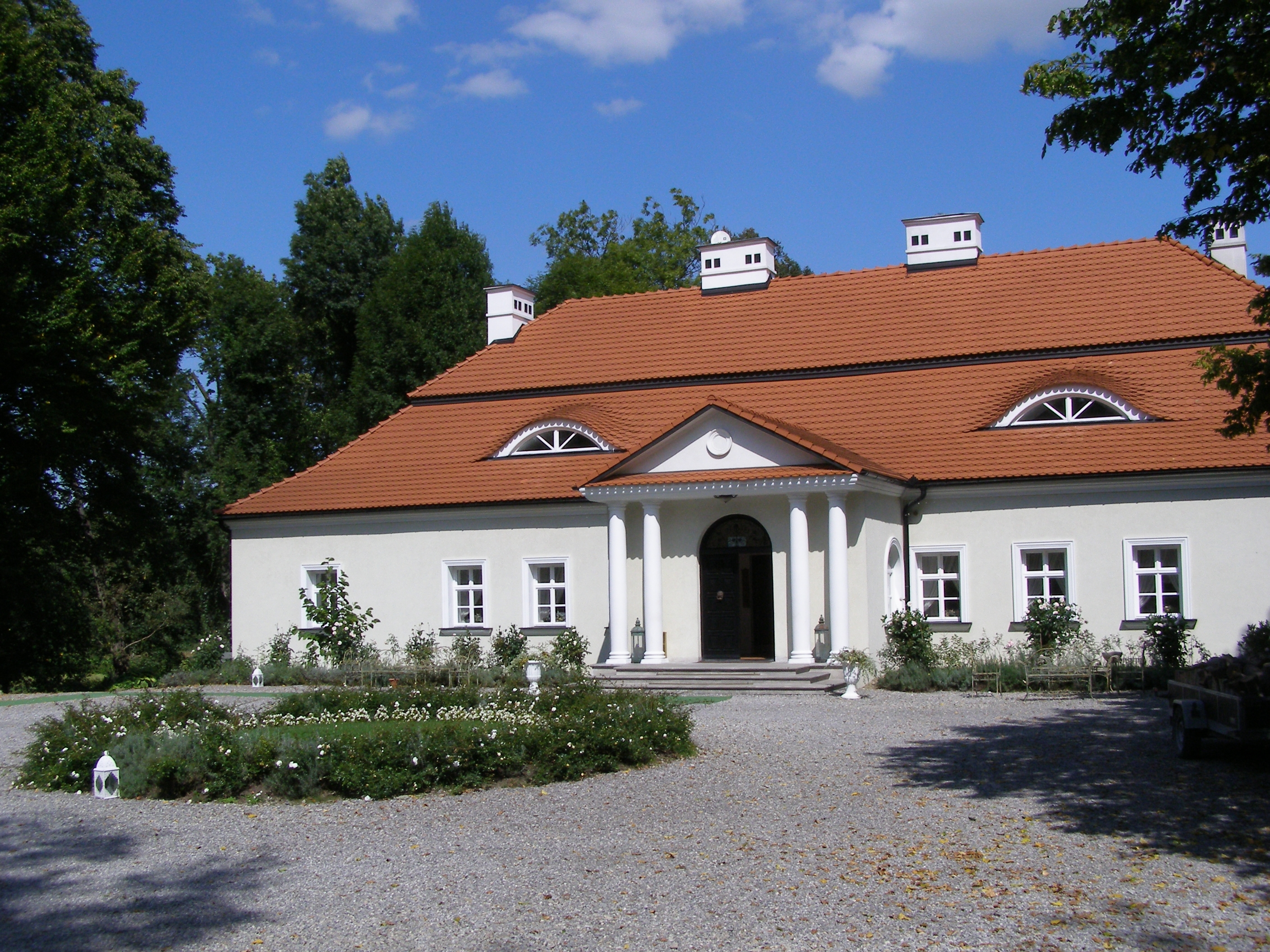
- Manor in Bistuszowa

- Location within Poland
- Coordinates: 49°53′N 21°5′E
- Country: Poland
- Voivodeship: Lesser Poland
- County: Tarnów
- Gmina: Ryglice
- Elevation: 380 m (1,250 ft)

Bistuszowa [bistuˈʂɔva] is a village in the administrative district of Gmina Ryglice, within Tarnów County, Lesser Poland Voivodeship, in southern Poland.
