= Brzostek =

- Town
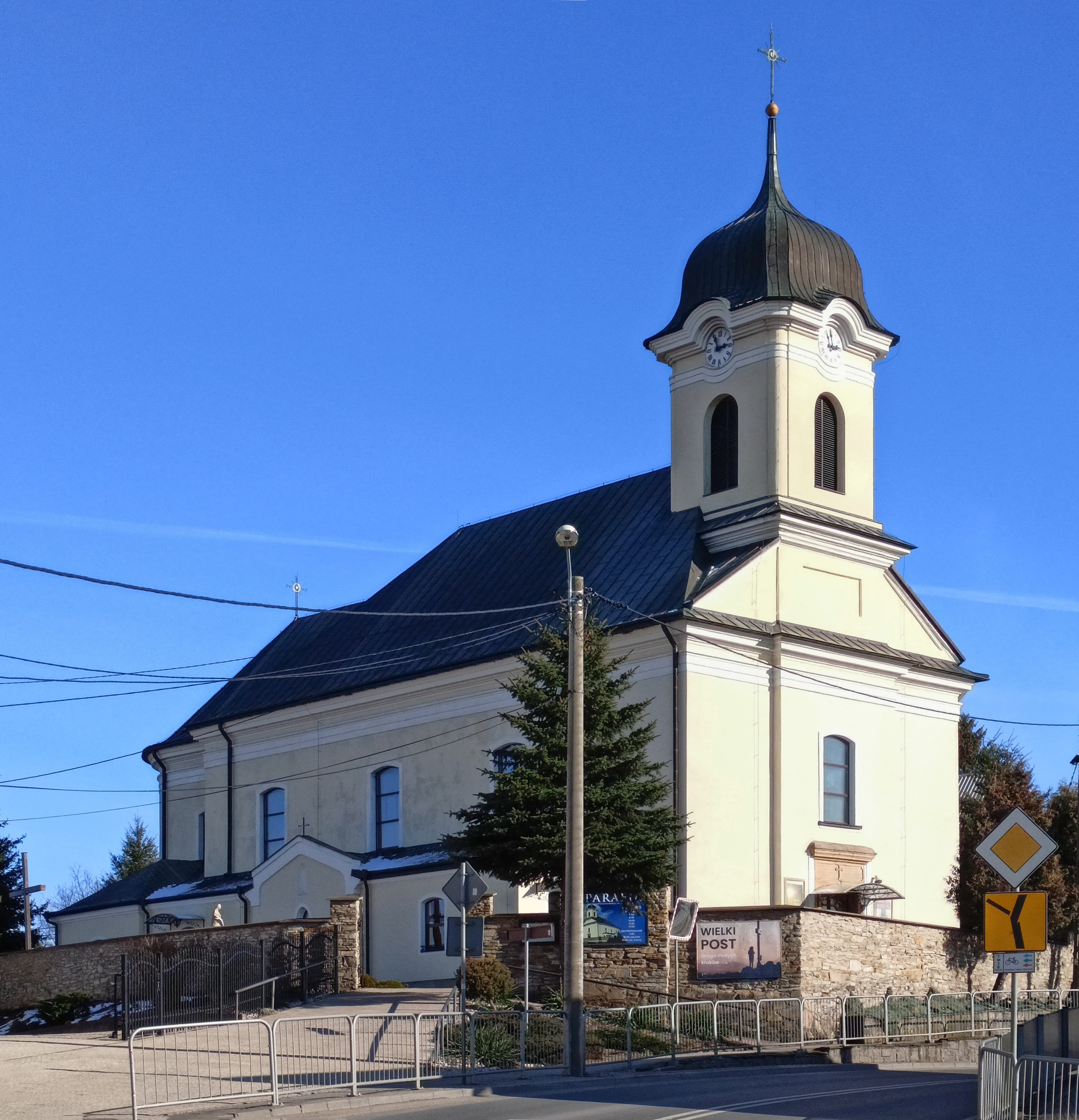
- Holy Cross Church, 2023

- Coat of arms

- Location within Poland
- Coordinates: 49°52′56″N 21°24′26″E
- Country: Poland
- Voivodeship: Subcarpathian
- County: Dębica
- Gmina: Brzostek
- Town rights: 1367-1934, 2009

Government
  - Mayor: Zbigniew Kowalski (PiS)

Area
  - Total: 8.76 km^{2} (3.38 sq mi)

Population (31 December 2021)
  - Total: 2,760
  - Density: 315/km^{2} (816/sq mi)
- Time zone: UTC+1 (CET)
  - Summer (DST): UTC+2 (CEST)
- Postal code: 39-230
- Area code: +48 14
- Car plates: RDE

Brzostek [ˈbʐɔstɛk] is a town in Dębica County, Subcarpathian Voivodeship, south-eastern Poland (historic province of Lesser Poland). It is the seat of the gmina (administrative district) called Gmina Brzostek. As of December 2021, the town has a population of 2,760. Brzostek is a local center of education and commerce, and its urban layout, dating back to the Middle Ages, is part of the Polish Registry of Cultural Property as a heritage site.

== History ==
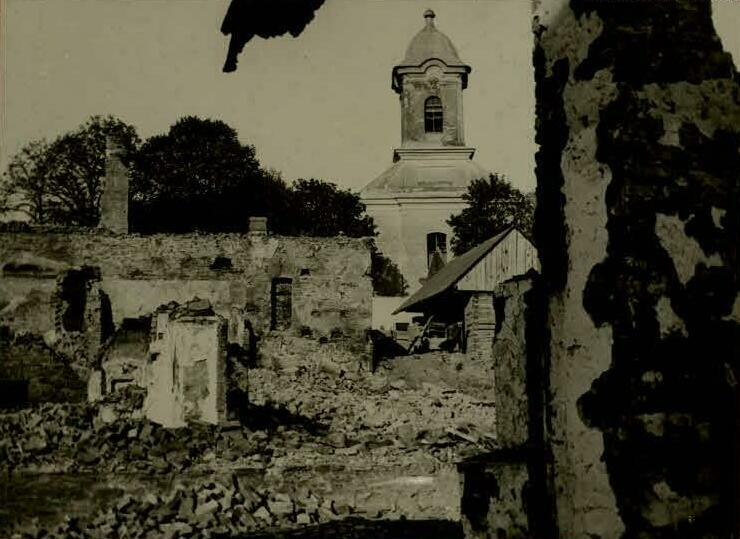
World War I destruction in 1915

Brzostek gained its Magdeburg rights in 1367, but first documented mentions of the town come from 1123 to 1125, when a list of possessions of the Benedictine Abbey in Tyniec was created. Among a number of villages specified in the document, there is Brzostek (spelt Brestek). For centuries Brzostek remained a small town, frequently destroyed in numerous wars and conflicts. In 1657 the town was burned by the forces of the Transylvanian prince George II Rákóczi, who crossed into Poland earlier in the year during the Deluge.

Following the partitions of Poland in the late 18th century, Brzostek along with most of the region became part of Austria and remained in Austria until World War I (1914–1918). On 18 February 1846 the Galician peasant revolt started in the town (see Jakub Szela), and in the second half of the 19th century, Ignacy Łukasiewicz opened his pharmacy here. In 1934 Brzostek lost its town status, as its population was under 3,000, too small to be officially called a town. Its Jewish population was murdered by the Germans in the Holocaust, Brzostek itself was 65% destroyed during World War II.

It regained the town status on 1 January 2009.

== Main sights ==
Among points of interest there are 18th and 19th-century houses in the market square, roadside chapels (18th and 19th centuries), the Neoclassical Holy Cross Church (1818), and World War I military cemeteries.
