= Gmina Żyraków =

Gmina Żyraków Żyraków Commune
- Gmina
- Coat of arms
- Interactive map of Gmina Żyraków
- Coordinates (Żyraków): 50°5′N 21°24′E
- Country: Poland
- Voivodeship: Subcarpathian
- County: Dębica
- Seat: Żyraków

Area
  - Total: 110.29 km^{2} (42.58 sq mi)

Population (2006)
  - Total: 13,328
  - Density: 120.85/km^{2} (312.99/sq mi)
- Website: http://www.zyrakow.pl

Gmina Żyraków is a rural gmina (administrative district) in Dębica County, Subcarpathian Voivodeship, in southeastern Poland. Its seat is the village of Żyraków, which lies approximately 4 kilometres (2 mi) north of Dębica and 44 km (27 mi) west of the regional capital Rzeszów.

The gmina covers an area of 110.29 square kilometres (42.6 sq mi), and as of 2006 its total population is 13,328.

== Villages ==
Gmina Żyraków contains the villages and settlements of Bobrowa, Bobrowa Wola, Góra Motyczna, Korzeniów, Mokre, Nagoszyn, Straszęcin, Wiewiórka, Wola Wielka, Wola Żyrakowska, Zasów, Zawierzbie and Żyraków.

== Neighbouring gminas ==
Gmina Żyraków is bordered by the town of Dębica and by the gminas of Czarna, Dębica, Przecław and Radomyśl Wielki.
