= Kamienica Górna =

- Village
- Location within Poland
- Coordinates: 49°53′N 21°29′E
- Country: Poland
- Voivodeship: Subcarpathian
- County: Dębica
- Gmina: Brzostek

Kamienica Górna [kamjɛˈnit͡sa ˈɡurna] is a village in the administrative district of Gmina Brzostek, within Dębica County, Subcarpathian Voivodeship, in south-eastern Poland.
