= Gmina Jodłowa =

Gmina Jodłowa Jodłowa Commune
- Gmina
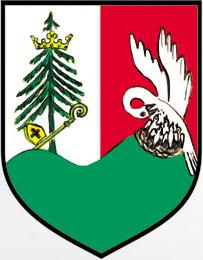
- Coat of arms
- Interactive map of Gmina Jodłowa
- Coordinates (Jodłowa): 49°52′0″N 21°18′0″E
- Country: Poland
- Voivodeship: Subcarpathian
- County: Dębica
- Seat: Jodłowa

Area
  - Total: 59.86 km^{2} (23.11 sq mi)

Population (2006)
  - Total: 5,439
  - Density: 90.86/km^{2} (235.3/sq mi)
- Website: http://www.ugjodlowa.itl.pl/

Gmina Jodłowa is a rural gmina (administrative district) in Dębica County, Subcarpathian Voivodeship, in south-eastern Poland. Its seat is the village of Jodłowa, which lies approximately 22 kilometres (14 mi) south of Dębica and 54 km (34 mi) west of the regional capital Rzeszów.

The gmina covers an area of 59.86 square kilometres (23.1 sq mi), and as of 2006 its total population is 5,439.

The gmina contains part of the protected area called Pasmo Brzanki Landscape Park.

== Villages ==
Gmina Jodłowa contains the villages and settlements of Dęborzyn, Dębowa, Dzwonowa, Jodłowa and Zagórze.

== Neighbouring gminas ==
Gmina Jodłowa is bordered by the gminas of Brzostek, Brzyska, Pilzno, Ryglice and Szerzyny.
