= Gmina Ryglice =

Gmina Ryglice Ryglice Commune
- Gmina
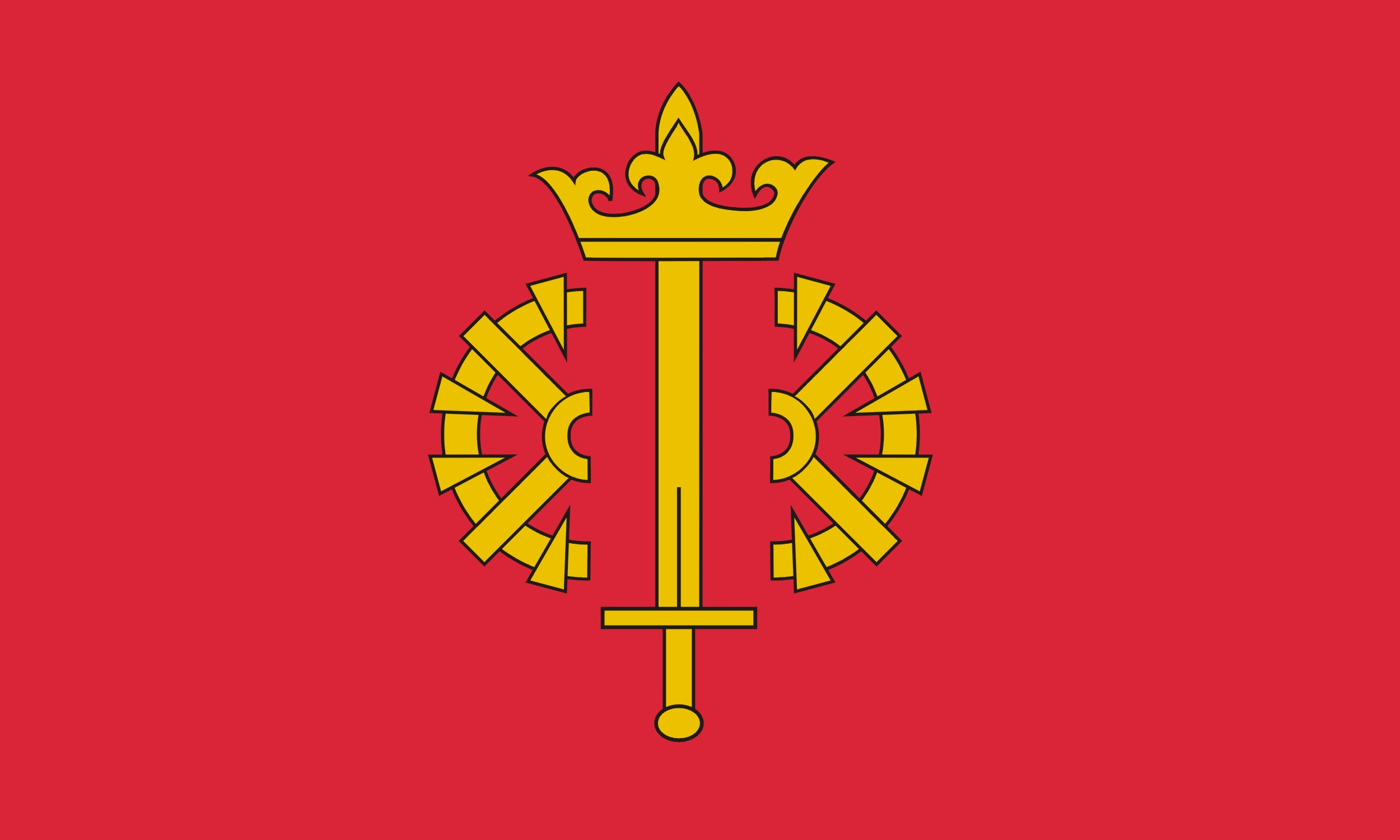
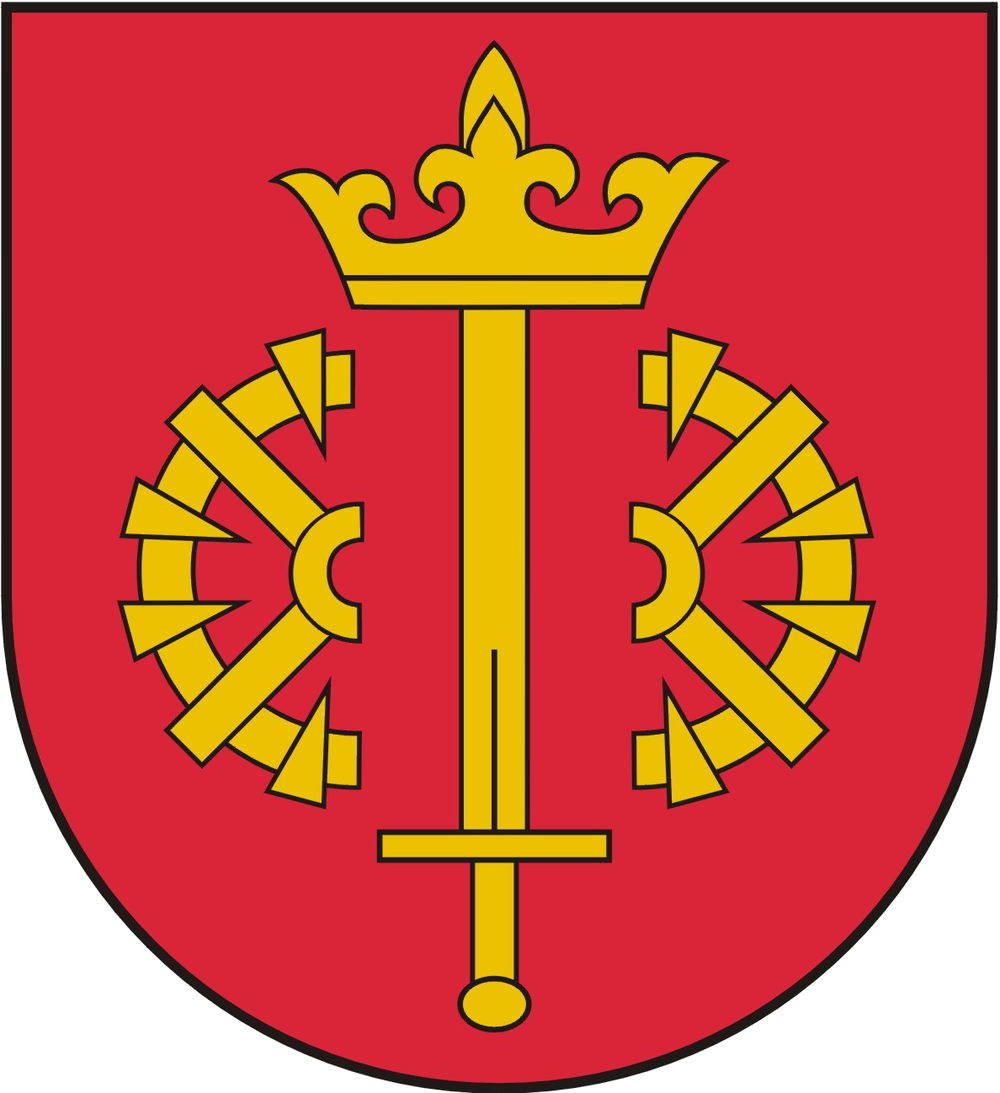
- Flag Coat of arms
- Interactive map of Gmina Ryglice
- Coordinates (Ryglice): 49°53′N 21°8′E
- Country: Poland
- Voivodeship: Lesser Poland
- County: Tarnów County
- Seat: Ryglice

Area
  - Total: 116.81 km^{2} (45.10 sq mi)

Population (2006)
  - Total: 11,438
  - Density: 97.920/km^{2} (253.61/sq mi)
  - Urban: 2,784
  - Rural: 8,654
- Website: http://www.ryglice.pl

Gmina Ryglice is an urban-rural gmina (administrative district) in Tarnów County, Lesser Poland Voivodeship, in southern Poland. Its seat is the town of Ryglice, which lies approximately 20 kilometres (12 mi) south-east of Tarnów and 88 km (55 mi) east of the regional capital Kraków.

The gmina covers an area of 116.81 square kilometres (45.1 sq mi), and as of 2006 its total population is 11,438 (out of which the population of Ryglice amounts to 2,784, and the population of the rural part of the gmina is 8,654).

The gmina contains part of the protected area called Pasmo Brzanki Landscape Park.

== Villages ==
Apart from the town of Ryglice, Gmina Ryglice contains the villages and settlements of Bistuszowa, Joniny, Kowalowa, Lubcza, Uniszowa, Wola Lubecka and Zalasowa.

== Neighbouring gminas ==
Gmina Ryglice is bordered by the gminas of Jodłowa, Pilzno, Skrzyszów, Szerzyny and Tuchów.
