= Bukowa, Podkarpackie Voivodeship =

Bukowa
- Village
- Location within Poland
- Coordinates: 49°50′41″N 21°24′29″E
- Country: Poland
- Voivodeship: Subcarpathian
- County: Dębica
- Gmina: Brzostek

Bukowa [buˈkɔva] is a village in the administrative district of Gmina Brzostek, within Dębica County, Subcarpathian Voivodeship, in south-eastern Poland.
