= Jakub Szela =

Polish leader of peasant uprising (1787–1860)

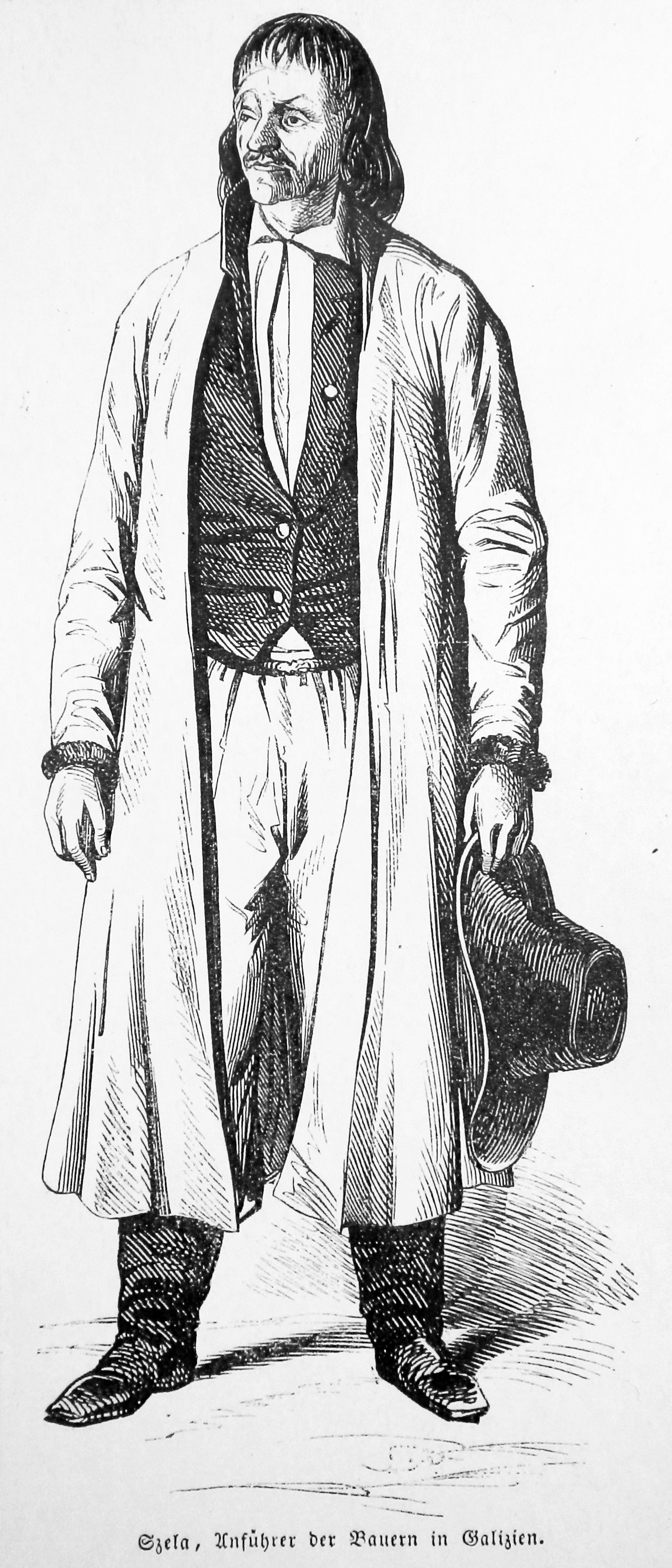
- A depiction of Szela from the Illustrirte Chronik, 1848
- Born: July 14, 1787; Smarżowa, Kingdom of Galicia and Lodomeria
- Died: April 21, 1860 (aged 72); Dealul Ederii, Duchy of Bukovina
- Occupation: Peasant
- Known for: Galician Peasant Uprising of 1846

Jakub Szela (was born 14 July 1787, Smarżowa, in Galicia - died 21 April 1860, Dealul Ederii, in Bukovina, now Romania) was a Polish leader of a peasant uprising against the Polish gentry in Galicia in 1846; directed against manorial property and oppression (for example, the manorial prisons) and rising against serfdom; scores of manors were attacked and their inhabitants murdered. Galician, mainly Polish, peasants killed ca. 1000 noblemen and destroyed ca. 500 manors in 1846.

== Life ==
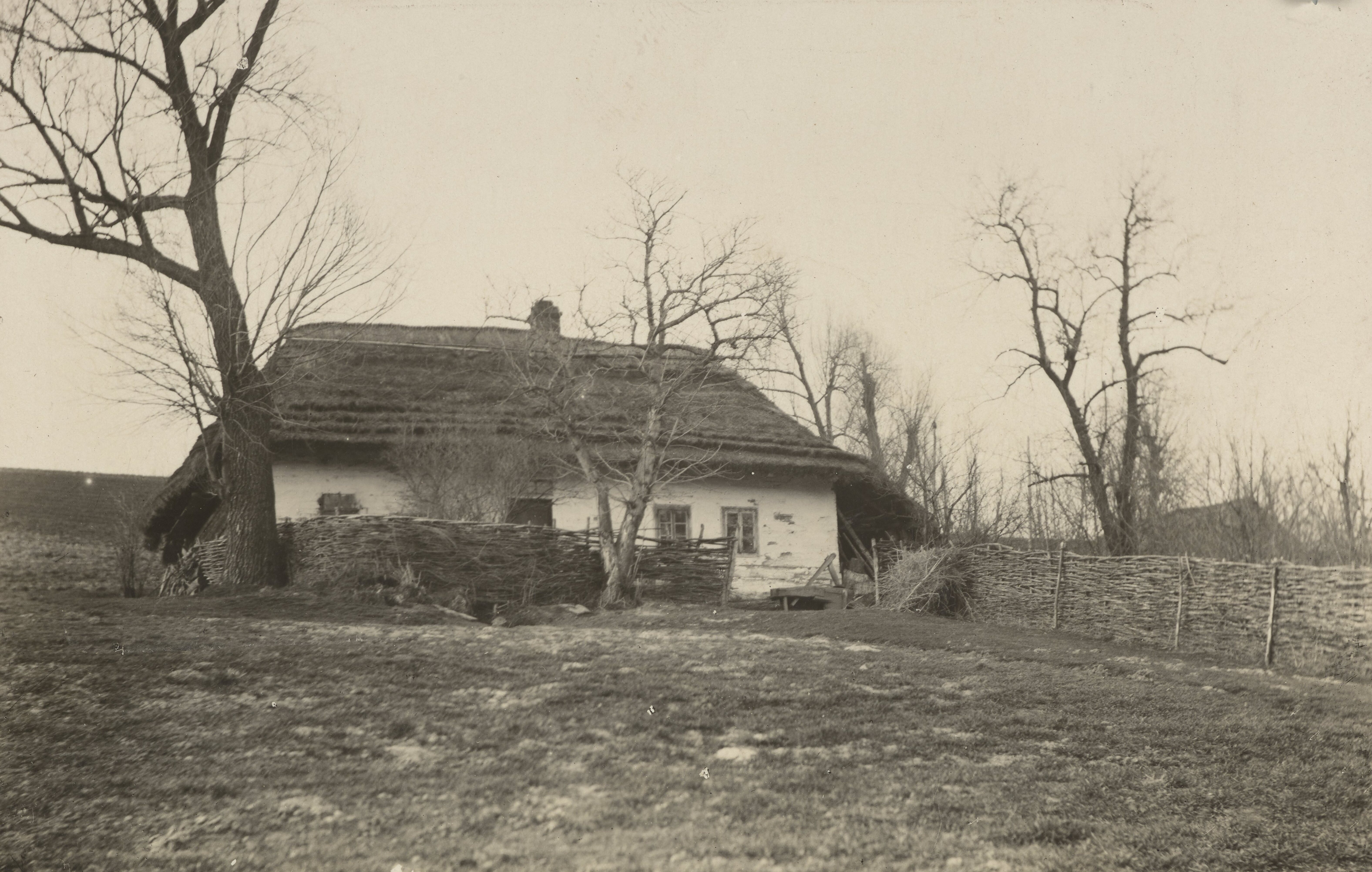
Szela family's house in Smarżowa

He represented his village in an extended conflict with its unjust lord and was arrested and lashed several times. During the 1846 rebellion, instigated by Vienna, Szela became the leader of the Galician peasants, destroyed a number of manors, and killed, among others, the family of his lord, though he is reported to have saved the children. Szela tried to organize an all-Galician peasant uprising, with the main slogan of corvee refusal. The rebellious villages were pacified by the Austrian Army. After pacification of the rebellious villages by the Austrian Army, Szela was briefly arrested, and then resettled to Bukovina, where he was given a land grant by the Austrian government. He is also said to have received a medal from the Austrian government, an event reported as fact by Magosci et al. but played down as only a "Polish rumor" by Wolff.

== In popular culture ==
Szela was portrayed sympathetically by Marie von Ebner-Eschenbach, a Czech-born Austrian writer who had serfs before 1848, in her short story “Jakob Szela” in Dorf- und Schlossgeschichten (1883). The massacre of the gentry in 1846 was the historical memory that haunted Stanisław Wyspiański's play The Wedding. He was also featured in a recent Monika Strzępka and Paweł Demirski’s play “In the Name of Jakub S.”.
