= Korzeniów, Podkarpackie Voivodeship =

Korzeniów
- Village
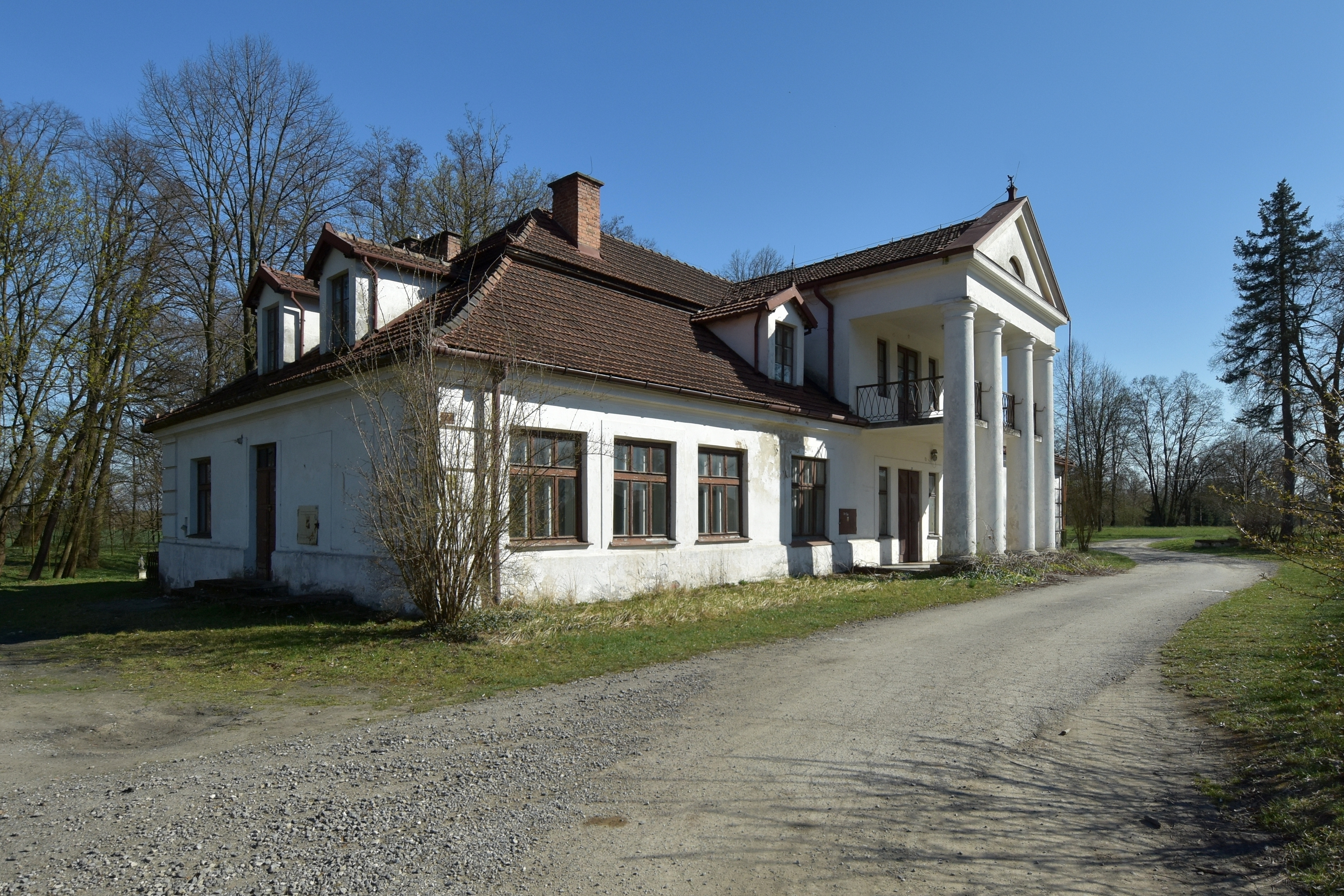
- Historic manor in Korzeniów

- Location within Poland
- Coordinates: 50°9′46″N 21°27′35″E
- Country: Poland
- Voivodeship: Subcarpathian
- County: Dębica
- Gmina: Żyraków
- Time zone: UTC+1 (CET)
  - Summer (DST): UTC+2 (CEST)
- Vehicle registration: RDE

Korzeniów [kɔˈʐɛɲuf] is a village in the administrative district of Gmina Żyraków, within Dębica County, Subcarpathian Voivodeship, in south-eastern Poland.

Five Polish citizens were murdered by Nazi Germany in the village during World War II.
