= Jodłowa =

- Village
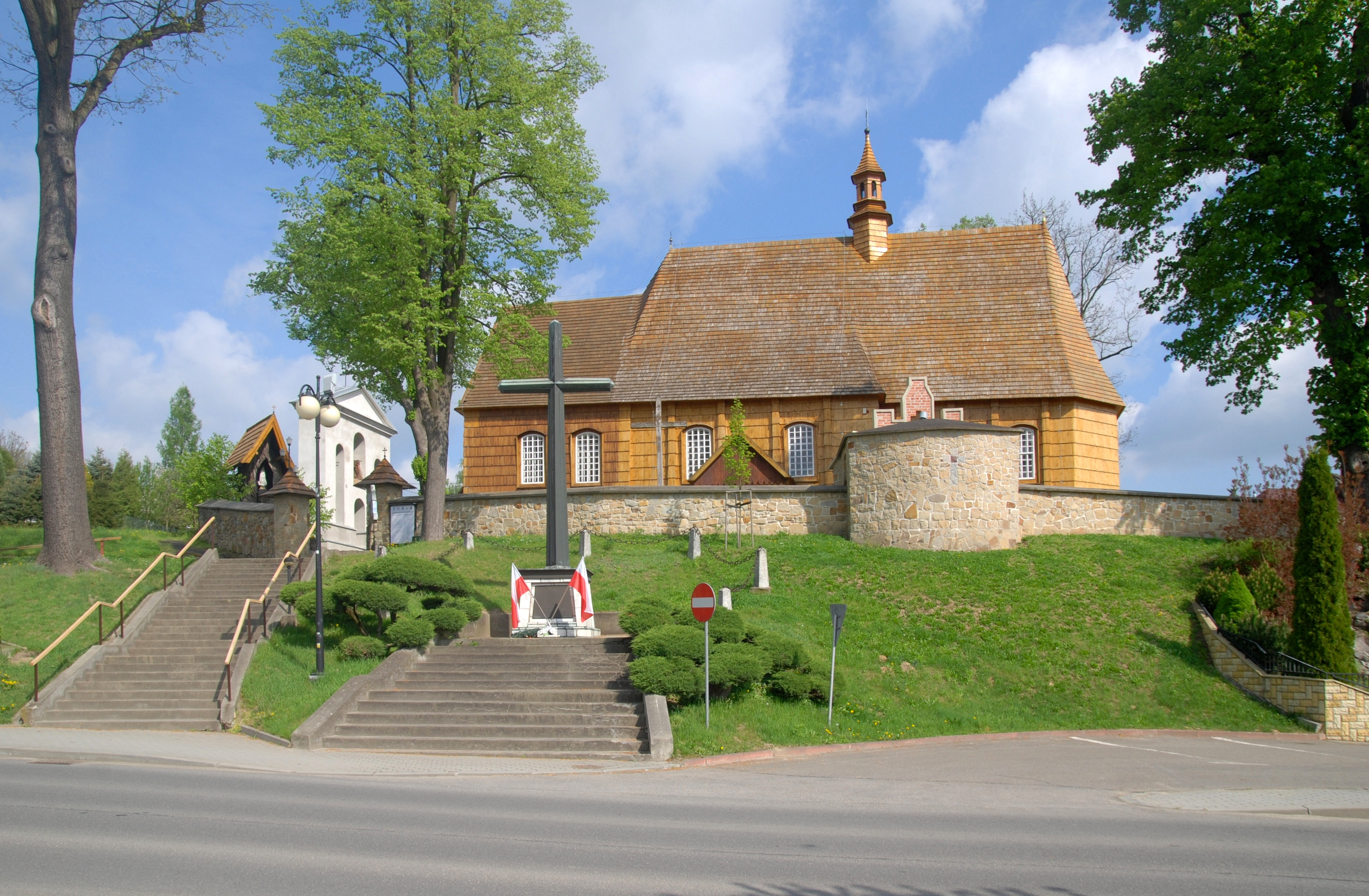
- Church of Saint Stanislaus

- Location within Poland
- Coordinates: 49°52′0″N 21°18′0″E
- Country: Poland
- Voivodeship: Subcarpathian
- County: Dębica
- Gmina: Jodłowa

Population
  - Total: 4,100
- Time zone: UTC+1 (CET)
  - Summer (DST): UTC+2 (CEST)
- Vehicle registration: RDE

Jodłowa [jɔdˈwɔva] is a village in Dębica County, Subcarpathian Voivodeship, in south-eastern Poland. It is the seat of the gmina (administrative district) called Gmina Jodłowa.
