= Żyraków =

- Village
- Location within Poland
- Coordinates: 50°5′N 21°24′E
- Country: Poland
- Voivodeship: Subcarpathian
- County: Dębica
- Gmina: Żyraków
- Population: 1,400

Żyraków [ʐɨˈrakuf] is a village in Dębica County, Subcarpathian Voivodeship, in south-eastern Poland. It is the seat of the gmina (administrative district) called Gmina Żyraków.
