= Klecie, Podkarpackie Voivodeship =

Klecie
- Village
- Location within Poland
- Coordinates: 49°51′N 21°24′E
- Country: Poland
- Voivodeship: Subcarpathian
- County: Dębica
- Gmina: Brzostek

Klecie [ˈklɛt͡ɕɛ] is a village in the administrative district of Gmina Brzostek, within Dębica County, Subcarpathian Voivodeship, in south-eastern Poland.
