= Dębica County =

Dębica County Powiat dębicki
- County
- Flag Coat of arms

- Location within the voivodeship
- Coordinates (Dębica): 50°3′N 21°25′E
- Country: Poland
- Voivodeship: Subcarpathian
- Seat: Dębica
- Gminas: Total 7 (incl. 1 urban): Dębica; Gmina Brzostek; Gmina Czarna; Gmina Dębica; Gmina Jodłowa; Gmina Pilzno; Gmina Żyraków

Area
  - Total: 776.36 km^{2} (299.75 sq mi)

Population (2019)
  - Total: 135,348
  - Density: 174.34/km^{2} (451.53/sq mi)
  - Urban: 53,298
  - Rural: 82,050
- Car plates: RDE
- Website: powiatdebicki.pl

Dębica County (Polish: powiat dębicki) is a unit of territorial administration and local government (powiat) in Subcarpathian Voivodeship, south-eastern Poland. It was created on 1 January 1999 as a result of the Polish local government reforms passed in 1998. Its administrative seat and largest town is Dębica, which lies 43 kilometres (27 mi) west of the regional capital Rzeszów. The only other towns in the county are Pilzno, lying 12 km (7 mi) south-west of Dębica, and Brzostek, 19 km (12 mi) south of Dębica.

The county covers an area of 776.36 square kilometres (299.8 sq mi). As of 2019 its total population is 135,348, out of which the population of Dębica is 45,634, that of Pilzno is 4,912, that of Brzostek is 2,752, and the rural population is 82,050.

== Neighbouring counties ==
Dębica County is bordered by Mielec County to the north, Ropczyce-Sędziszów County to the east, Strzyżów County to the south-east, Jasło County to the south, and Tarnów County and Dąbrowa County to the west.

== Administrative divisions ==
The county is subdivided into seven gminas (one urban, two urban-rural and four rural). These are listed in the following table, in descending order of population.

Gmina	Type	Area (km^{2})	Population (2019)	Seat
Dębica	urban	34.1	45,634	
Gmina Dębica	rural	137.6	25,832	Dębica *
Gmina Pilzno	urban-rural	165.2	18,223	Pilzno
Gmina Żyraków	rural	110.3	14,108	Żyraków
Gmina Brzostek	urban-rural	122.6	13,063	Brzostek
Gmina Czarna	rural	149.0	13,107	Czarna
Gmina Jodłowa	rural	59.9	5,381	Jodłowa
* seat not part of the gmina

== Transport ==
Debica is the county's only rail junction, from which lines emerge in three directions – eastwards to Rzeszow, westwards to Tarnow and northwards to Mielec. The west–east line, which goes from Wrocław via Debica, to Przemyśl, is electrified and is regarded as one of the most important rail connections in Poland. The line to Mielec, which goes further northwards to Tarnobrzeg and Sandomierz, is of secondary importance and is not electrified.

The county is conveniently located along the longest route in Europe, E40. Also, in Pilzno, the E40 road crosses with Polish national main road number 73, which goes from Kielce to Jasło.
