= Operation V-1 and V-2 Memorial =

Monument in Warsaw, Poland

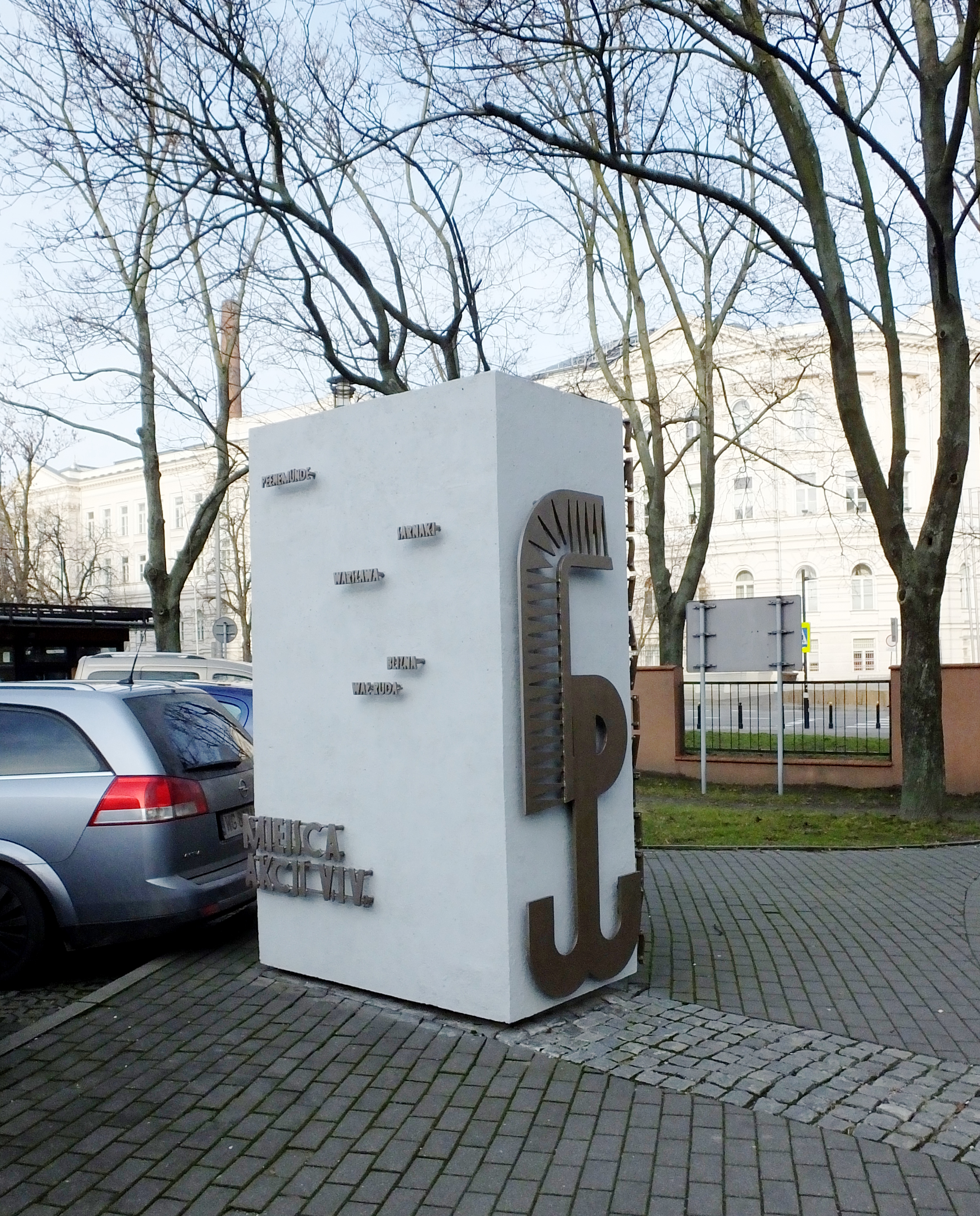
- The southwest side of the monument in 2020.
- Interactive map of Operation V-1 and V-2 Memorial
- Location: 15 and 19 Nowowiejska Street, Downtown, Warsaw, Poland
- Coordinates: 52°13′11.0″N 21°00′39.1″E
- Designer: Marek Łypaczewski
- Type: Monument
- Height: 2.5 m (8 ft 2 in)
- Opening date: 30 November 1991

The Operation V-1 and V-2 Memorial (Polish: Pomnik Akcji V-1 i V-2) is a monument in Warsaw, Poland, within the Downtown district. It is placed in front of the Faculty of Electronics and Information Technology of the Warsaw University of Technology at 15 and 19 Nowowiejska Street, next to the Polytechnic Square, within the neighbourhood of South Downtown. It commemorates the academics of the Warsaw University of Technology, who took part in the Home Army intelligence operation to decipher the radio guide systems of the V-1 and V-2 rocket projectiles used by the Wehrmacht during the Second World War. The monument was designed by Marek Łypaczewski, and unveiled on 30 November 1991.

== History ==
The monument commemorates the academics of the Warsaw University of Technology, who took part in the Home Army intelligence operation to decipher the radio guide systems of the V-1 and V-2 rocket projectiles used by the Wehrmacht during the Second World War. It was proposed in 1981 by novelist Maria Kann. The monument was designed by Marek Łypaczewski, and unveiled on 30 November 1991 in front of the Faculty of Electronics and Information Technology of the Warsaw University of Technology at 15 and 19 Nowowiejska Street, next to the Polytechnic Square. In 2007, an information board was erected next to the monument, with the information about the intelligence operation.

== Characteristics ==
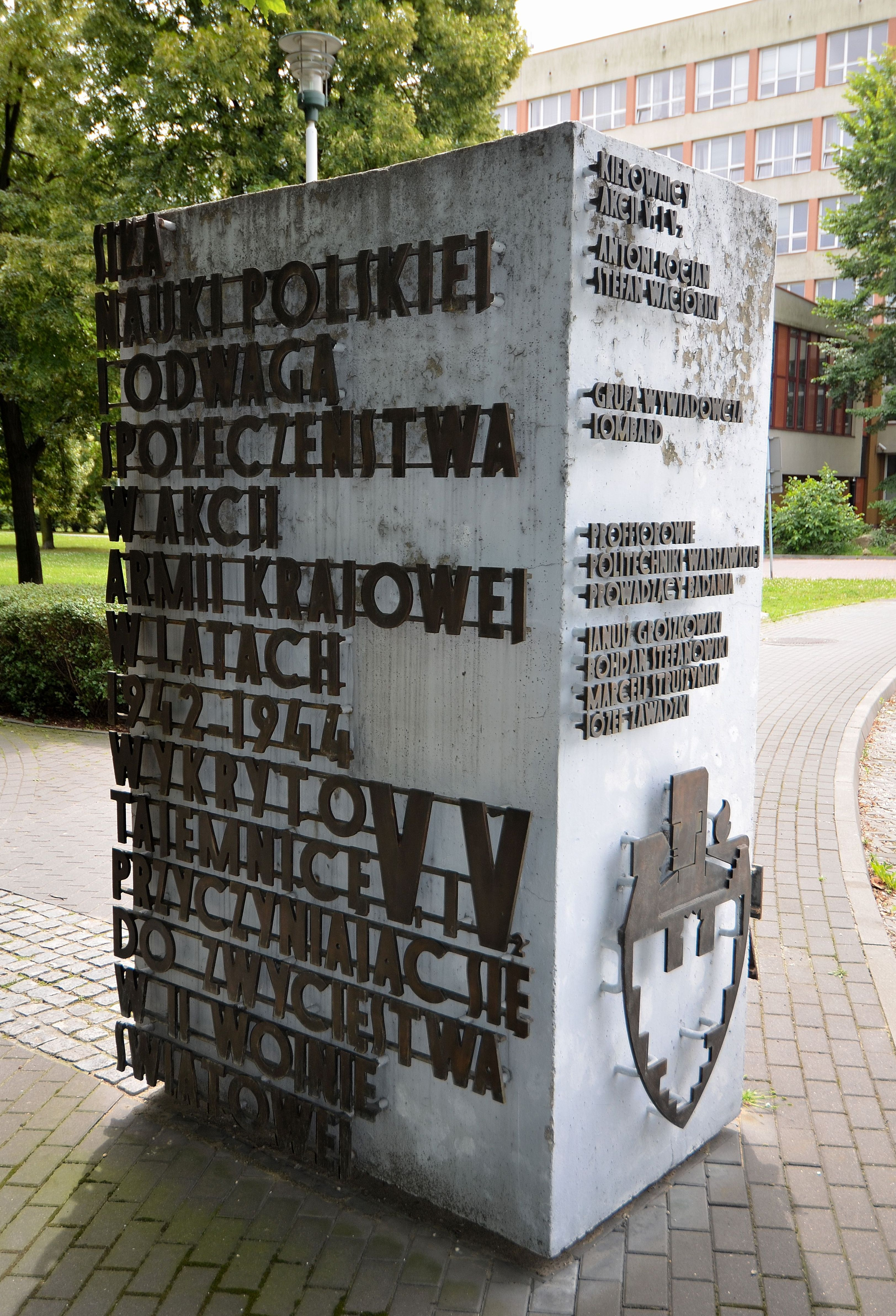
The northeast side of the monument in 2014.

The monument is placed in front of Faculty of Electronics and Information Technology of the Warsaw University of Technology at 15 and 19 Nowowiejska Street, next to the Polytechnic Square and the Marek Trzciński Park. It has a form a white cuboid with the height of 2.5 m. Its walls feature inscriptions in Polish, formed from large black metal letters. The front wall, facing to the north, features an inscription, which reads:

Polish inscription

Siłą nauki polskiej i odwagą społeczeństwa w akcji Armii Krajowej w latach 1942–1944 wykryto tajemnicę V-1 i V-2 przyczyniając się do zwycięstwa w II wojnie światowej

Translation:
English translation

The secret of the V-1 and V-2 was discovered with the power of science and the bravery of the society during the Home Army operation conducted between 1942 and 1944, leading to the victory in the Second World War

Its western wall features inscription commemorating the operation coordinators Antoni Kocjan and Stefan Waciórski, the Lombard intelligence group, and accademics of the Warsaw University of Technology, and well as its logo. It reads:

Polish inscription

Kierownicy akcji V-1 i V-2
Antoni Kocjan
Stefan Waciórski

Grupa wywiadowcza Lombard

Profesorowie Politechniki Warszawskiej
prowadzący badania
Janusz Groszkowski
Bohdan Stefanowski
Marceli Struszyński
Józef Zawadzki

Translation:
English translation

The coordinatiors of the Operation V-1 and V-2
Antoni Kocjan
Stefan Waciórski

Lombard intelligence group

The professors of the Warsaw University of Technology
conducting the research
Janusz Groszkowski
Bohdan Stefanowski
Marceli Struszyński
Józef Zawadzki

Its southern wall features names of places where the operation took place, spaced across its surface it relation to their location on the map. It lists Blizna, Peenemünde, Sarnaki, Wał-Ruda, and Warsaw (Polish: Warszawa). Its also inscribed with text, which reads "Miejsca Akcji V-1 and V-2", and means "The locations of the V-1 and V-2 Operation". The western wall features the Anchor, a symbol of the Home Army during the conflict, in form of stylised letters P and W, for fraze Polska Walcząca, meaning the Fighting Poland. Its decorated with the wings of Polish hussars.

An information board is placed near the monument, with the information about the V-1 and V-2 Operation in Polish and English.

== Gallery ==
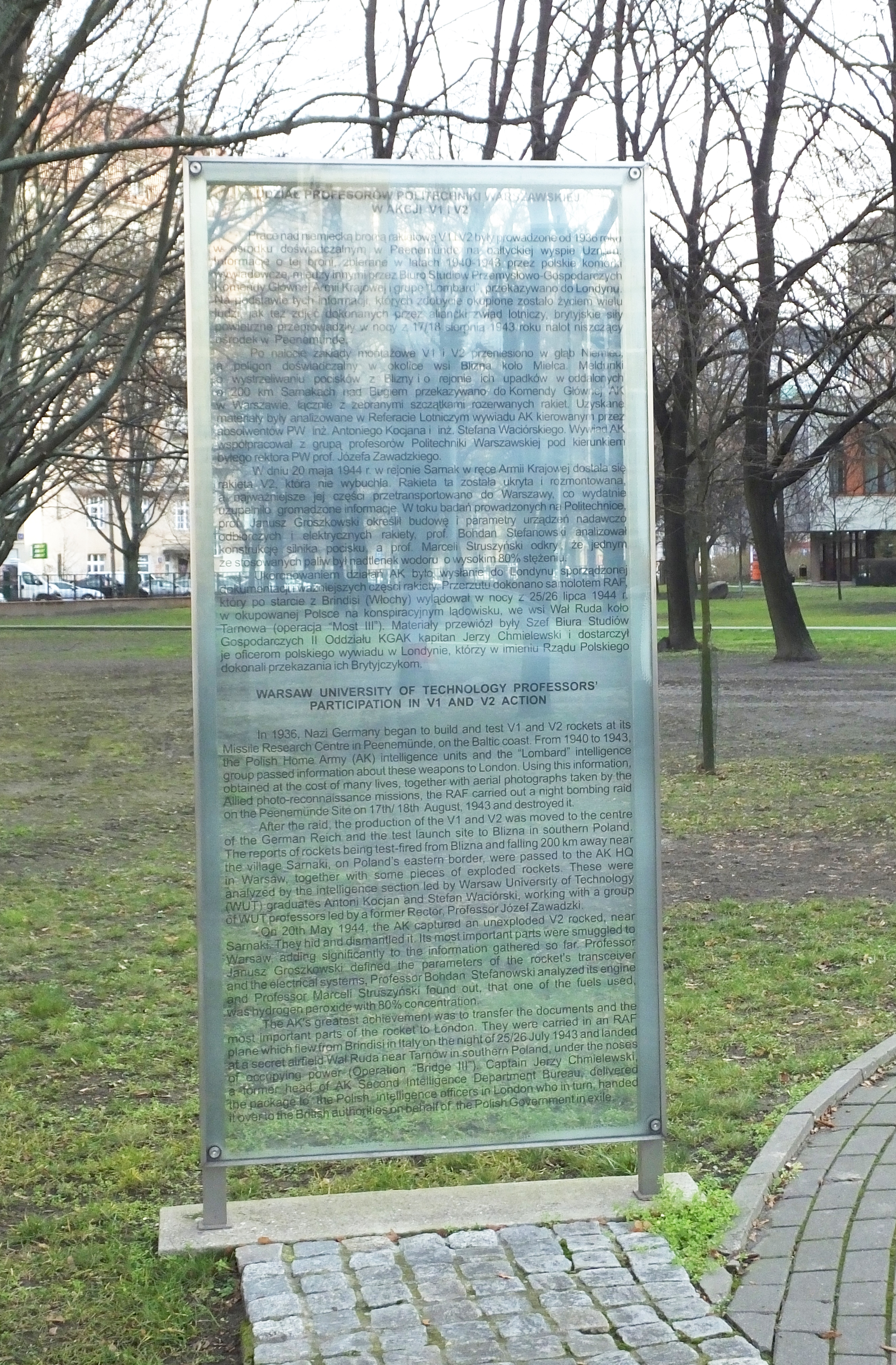
An information board next to the monument.
