= Struszyński =

Struszyński may refer to:

- Marceli Struszyński (1880–1959), Polish chemist
- Wacław Struszyński (1904–1980), Polish electronic engineer
