= Blizna V-2 missile launch site =

World War II missile launch site in Ropczyce-Sędziszów, Poland

V-2 missile launch site military base Blizna
- Park Historyczny Blizna
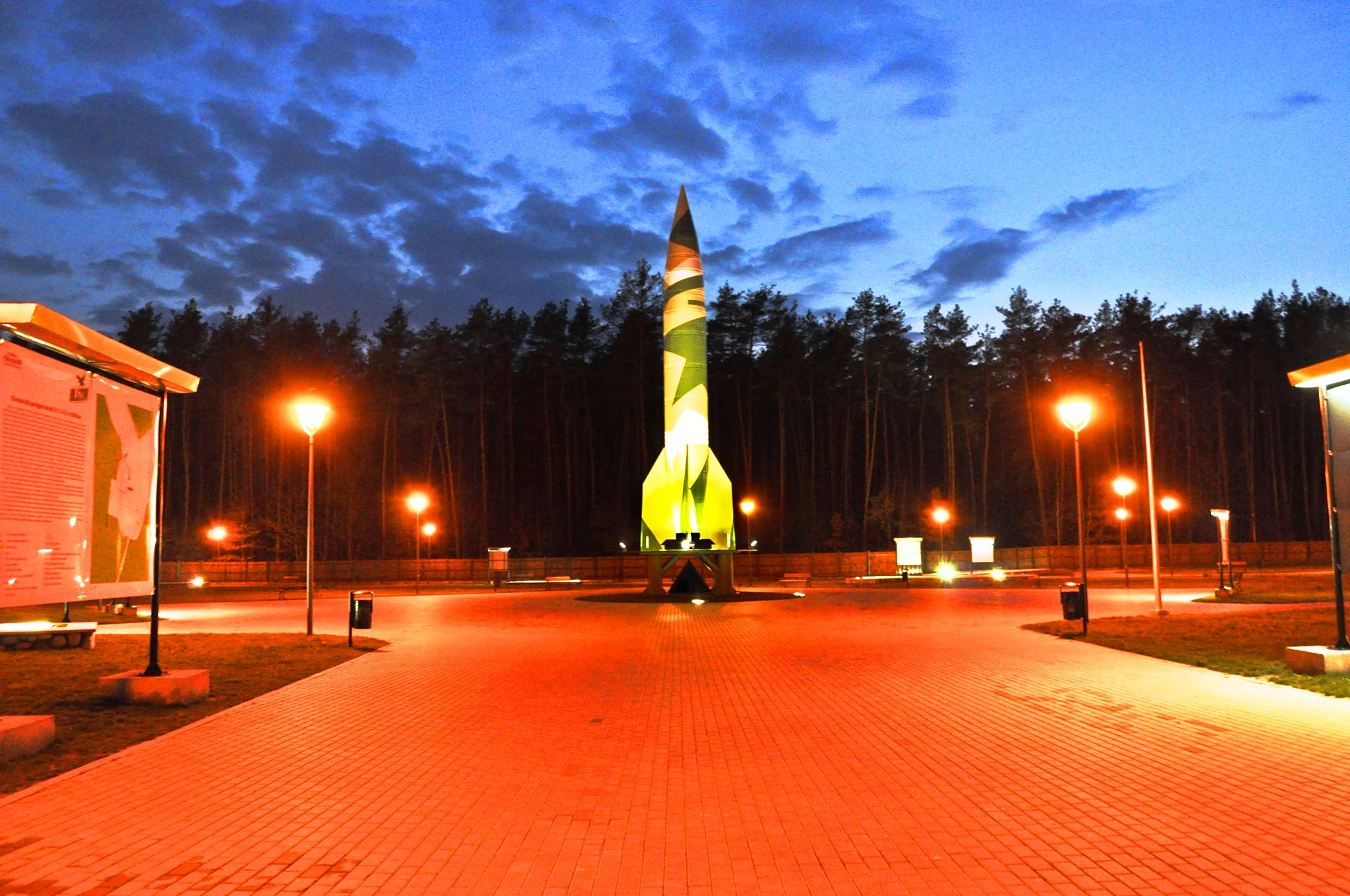
- Established: 2011
- Location: Blizna 68, 39–104 Ocieka, Ropczyce-Sędziszów, Poland
- Coordinates: 50°11′0″N 21°36′0″E
- Type: War museum
- Owner: Gmina Ostrów
- Website: Park Historyczny Blizna

SS-Truppenübungsplatz Heidelager
- Concentration camp
- Commandant: SS Oberführer Bernhardt Voss
- Killed: 15,000 total: 7,000 Jews, 5,000 Soviets, 3,000 Polish
- Liberated by: Armia Krajowa, Red Army

Map of Poland with marks showing location of Blizna and Sarnaki

The Blizna V-2 missile launch site was the site of a World War II German V-2 missile firing range. (Note: The modern museum is built on the exact site of the former V-2 launch site. Phase II building of the museum was completed in 2011.) Today there is a small museum located in the Park Historyczny Blizna (Historical Park) in Blizna, Poland. After the RAF strategic bombing of the V-2 rocket launch site in Peenemünde, Germany, in August 1943, some of the test and launch facilities were relocated to Blizna in November 1943. The first of 139 V-2 launches was carried out from the Blizna launch site on 5 November 1943.

== History ==
After the air raid on Peenemünde on 17 August 1943, German strategic command decided to divide the work on the V-2 rocket among three independently operating centres. Assembly plants were transferred to underground factories that had been built in a massive hollow cave complex in the Harz mountains in Germany. The research, development, and design (codenamed "Project Cement") were handled by secret offices in Ebensee, near the banks of Lake Traunsee in Austria. The main rocket testing, training, and launch site was transferred to Blizna in southeast Poland, outside of the range of Allied bombers. An SS military base near Blizna was set up on 5 November 1943, from which 139 A4 (also known as V-2) rockets were launched for experimental purposes and for training. The site was operational until early July 1944. Test launches also continued at Peenemünde until 21 February 1945.

Before construction began in Blizna, there was nothing there but uncleared forest. The Nazis used slave labour from the nearby SS Truppenübungsplatz Heidelager concentration camp in Pustków to build new infrastructure, starting with concrete roads, then a narrow-gauge railway line linking to the station at Kochanówka village. They built barracks, bunkers, buildings and all the specialised equipment needed for the operation and firing of rockets. In addition, efforts were made to disguise the site as much as possible. They did this by building an artificial village; cottages and barns were made of plywood, lines were hung with clothes and bed-sheets, and imitation people and animals were created using gypsum plaster.

The site was considered to be of such high strategic importance that it attracted personal visits from many of the Nazi régime's most elite officers; Heinrich Himmler and SS-Obergruppenführers Hans Kammler and Gottlob Berger visited in September 1943, and Adolf Hitler visited in the spring of 1944. The commander of the site was Major-General Dr Walter Dornberger, leader of Nazi Germany's V-2 rocket program. Wernher von Braun, creator of the V-2, the central figure in Germany's pre-war rocket development program, and post-war director of NASA's Marshall Space Flight Center, worked at the Blizna test site and personally visited the test missile impact areas to troubleshoot any problems discovered during trials.

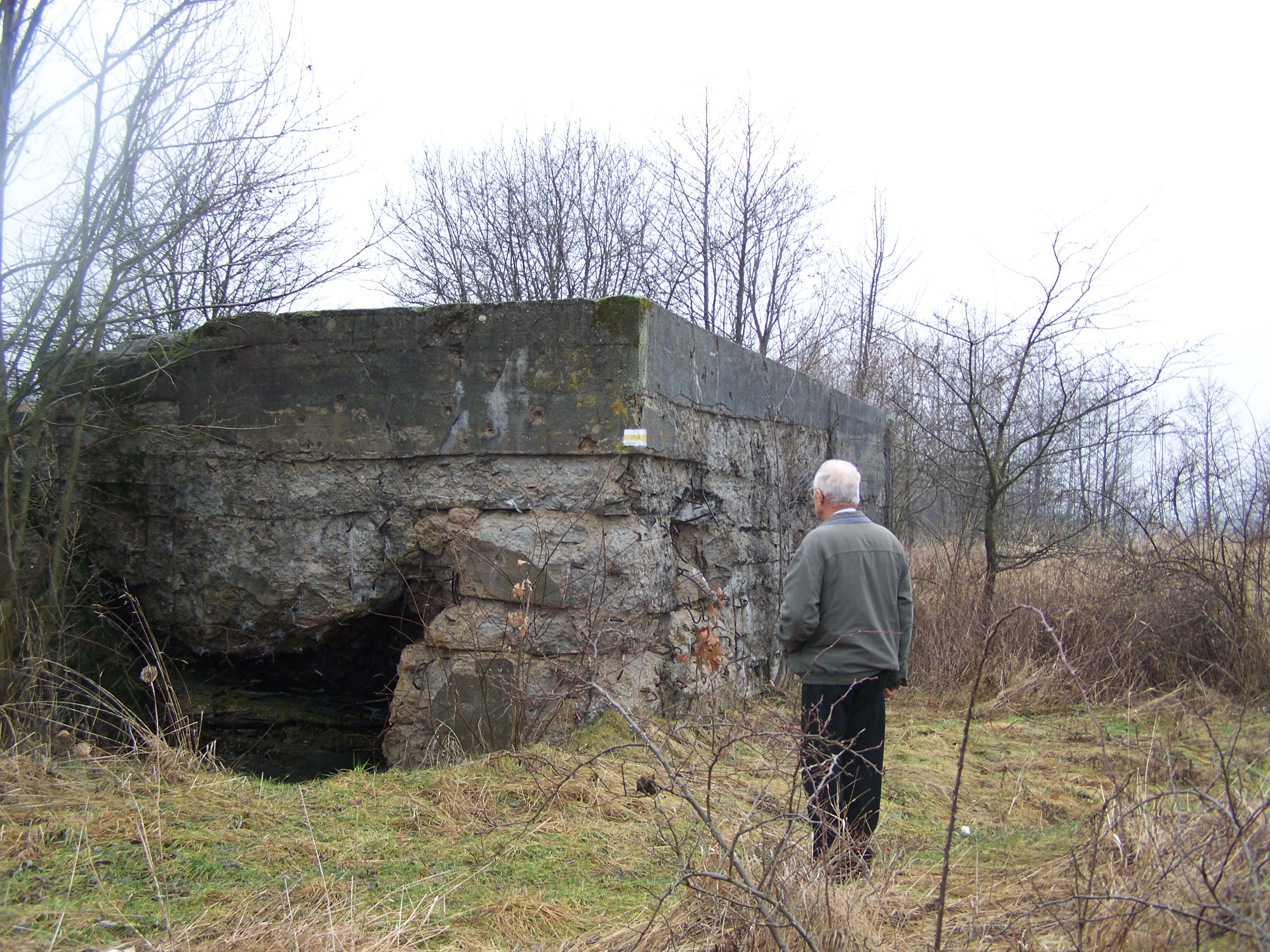
German World War II bunker near Sadykierz, 5.5 kilometres (3.4 miles) from the launch site

British Intelligence were very keen to obtain information about the new V-2 missile site. The first reports came in October 1943 from the Polish underground Home Army (Armia Krajowa) Intelligence HQ in Warsaw, stating that a number of villages around Dębica were being forcibly evacuated. This area was already known for its SS training centre SS-Truppenübungsplatz Heidelager. Further reports brought information about a new railway line being constructed in the same vicinity, leading to Blizna. A report made on 14 February 1944 gave information about a sighting of a rocket "fourteen metres (46 feet) long and [with] a weight of seven tons". On 22 February the report was of a projectile "twelve metres (39 feet) long, [with] a diameter [of] one and a half metres (4.9 feet) and a weight of twelve tons". These missiles were being fired 24 hours a day. The codebreakers at Bletchley Park in England also managed to decrypt vital information from German communications. These made mention of "Versuchsstab (experimental staff) Komanndostelle Siegfried" and of "SS-Truppenübungsplatz Heidelager". Many more communications were intercepted and decrypted, which together with information from the Polish, helped British Intelligence build up a good picture of what was going on.

The missile testing ground at Blizna was quickly located by the Polish resistance movement, the Armia Krajowa, thanks to reports from local farmers. The site was constantly under observation by Armia Krajowa and the Polish Peasant Battalions. Due to Blizna's perceived strategic importance, Armia Krajowa (AK) had many field agents operating covertly in the area; these included AK Kolbuszowa (code name: "Kefir"), AK Dębica (code name: "Deser") and AK Mielec (code name: "Mleko"). These field agents even managed to obtain pieces of the fired rockets, by arriving on the scene before German patrols. These fragments were then smuggled by AK agents to secret labs in Warsaw, where the rocket parts were analysed by specialist teams, headed by Professors Marceli Struszyński and Janusz Groszkowski, and glider constructor Antoni Kocjan. Vital information about the rocket propellant was discovered when numerous reports came in of a strong smell of alcohol at the crash sites. (Note: The V-2 propellant formula comprises: fuel, alcohol, liquid oxygen, hydrogen peroxide and sodium permanganate (catalyst).) AK agent Aleksander Rusin (code name: "Rusal") was one of these witnesses. A V-2 missile crash-landed near to his observation location near Mielec. Rusin ran up to the crash site and found an intact working motor, which he managed to measure and sketch shortly before it exploded.

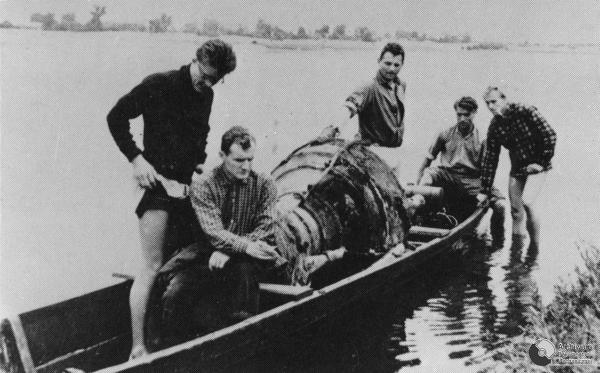
V-2 rocket being recovered from the Bug River near Sarnaki, about 129 km (80 mi) east of Warsaw

In early March 1944 British Intelligence Headquarters received a report of an Armia Krajowa agent (code name: "Makara") who had covertly surveyed the Blizna railway line and observed a freight car heavily guarded by SS troops containing "an object which, though covered by a tarpaulin, bore every resemblance to a monstrous torpedo". Subsequently, a plan was formed to make an attempt to capture a whole unexploded V-2 rocket and transport it to Britain. The plan was to stop the train in the forested area between Brzeskie and Tarnów. Despite meticulous planning by Armia Krajowa, the security on the German supply trains had been increased dramatically and the plan had to be called off at the last minute, as it had become unfeasible. Around 20 May 1944, a relatively undamaged V-2 rocket fell on the swampy bank of the Bug River near the village of Sarnaki, south of Siemiatycze, and local Poles managed to hide it before Germans arrived. The rocket was then dismantled and smuggled across Poland. During the night of 25–26 July 1944, the Polish resistance (Home Army and V1 and V2) secretly transported parts of the rocket out of Poland in Operation Most III (Bridge III or Wildhorn III), for analysis by British Intelligence. The missile fragments were picked up by an RAF C-47 Dakota aeroplane from an AK agent (code name: "Motyl") in an abandoned airfield between the villages of Jadowniki Mokre and Wał-Ruda, near Żabno, at the junction of the Dunajec and Wisła rivers, Poland.

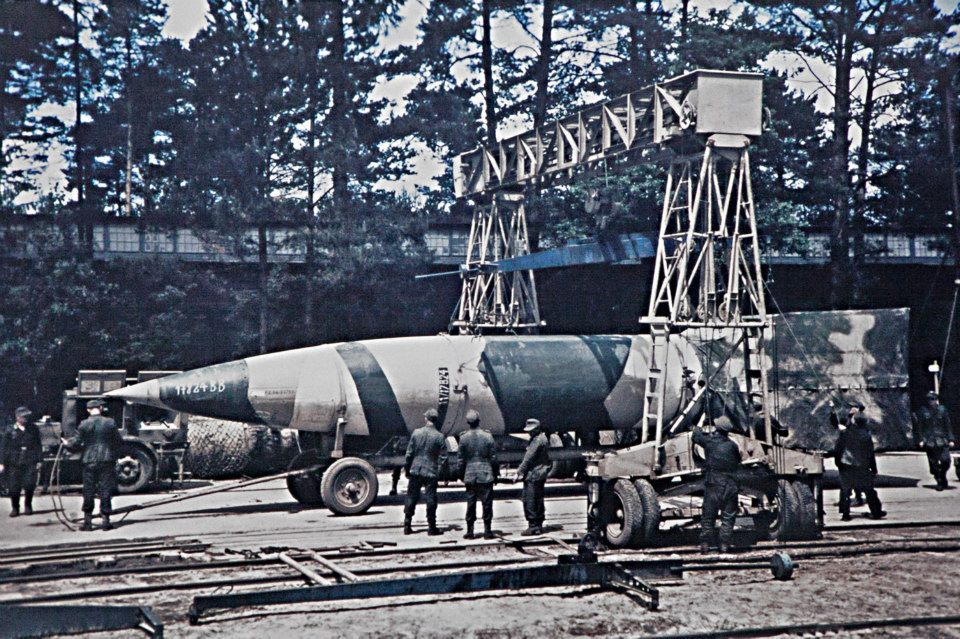
V-2 rocket at the Blizna launch site

On 13 July 1944, the British Prime Minister Winston Churchill wrote a letter to Joseph Stalin, informing him about the German V-2 missiles being tested in Blizna. In his letter, Churchill asked Stalin to instruct his troops, who were about 50 kilometres (31 miles) away from Dębica, to search for and preserve safely any apparatus and installations found at the base after it was captured by the advancing Soviet Army. He also asked Stalin to allow British experts to visit Dębica to examine the missile base. Stalin granted Churchill's requests; however, at the same time he instructed his army intelligence and USSR State Defense Committee People's Commissar for Aviation Industry, Alexei Shakhurin, to get ready for the examination of the German missiles. Shakhurin was ordered to have his weaponry experts in Dębica long before the British arrived. In late July 1944, the advance of the Red Army forced the Germans to evacuate the base at Blizna, and launch activities were moved to the Tuchola Forest. The Red Army reached Blizna on 6 August 1944, about ten days after the Germans had moved out. Many of the first remnants of V-2 missiles were recovered by troops of the 60th Army commanded by General Pavel Alekseyevich Kurochkin. British intelligence agents were eventually granted access to the launch site in September 1944. Their mission was to collect as many remaining rocket parts and as much intel on the site as they could. By then, the Red Army had already cleared out most of what the Germans had left and had shipped it to the Soviet Union, following Stalin's instructions. However, the British did manage to fill several crates with some useful V-2 rocket parts, which were then transported to England with the full co-operation of the Soviets. When the crates were opened in London, they did not have the expected contents; instead, they contained old rusty truck and tank parts, which had probably been substituted by Soviet agents.

== See also ==
- List of Blizna V-2 test launches
- Rocket launch site
- SS-Truppenübungsplatz Heidelager
- Operation Osoaviakhim

== Annotations ==
- First Launch: 1943-11-05. Last Launch: 1944-07-24. Number: 277 . Location: Blizna, Poland. Longitude: 21.6162 deg. Latitude: 50.1819 deg.
- Diver – a secret British Defence Instruction specified the code name: "Enemy Flying Bombs will be referred to or known as 'Diver' aircraft or pilotless planes" to alert defences of an imminent attack (often called Operation Diver, particularly post-war, without citation).

PERSONAL AND MOST SECRET MESSAGE FROM MR CHURCHILL TO MARSHAL STALIN

13 July 1944

1. There is firm evidence that the Germans have been conducting the trials of flying rockets from an experimental station at
Dębice in Poland for a considerable time. According to our information this missile has an explosive charge of about twelve
thousand pounds and the effectiveness of our counter-measures largely depends on how much we can find out about this weapon
before it is launched against this country. Dębice is in the path of your victorious advancing armies and it may well be that
you will overrun this place in the next few weeks.

2. Although the Germans will almost certainly destroy or remove as much of the equipment at Dębice as they can, it is
probable that a considerable amount of information will become available when the area is in Russian hands. In particular
we hope to learn how the rocket is discharged as this will enable us to locate the launching sites.

3. I should be grateful, therefore, Marshal Stalin, if you could give appropriate instructions for the preservation of such
apparatus and installations at Dębice as your armies are able to ensure after the area has been overrun, and that thereafter
you would afford us facilities for the examination of this experimental station by our experts.

– Winston Churchill

== Gallery ==
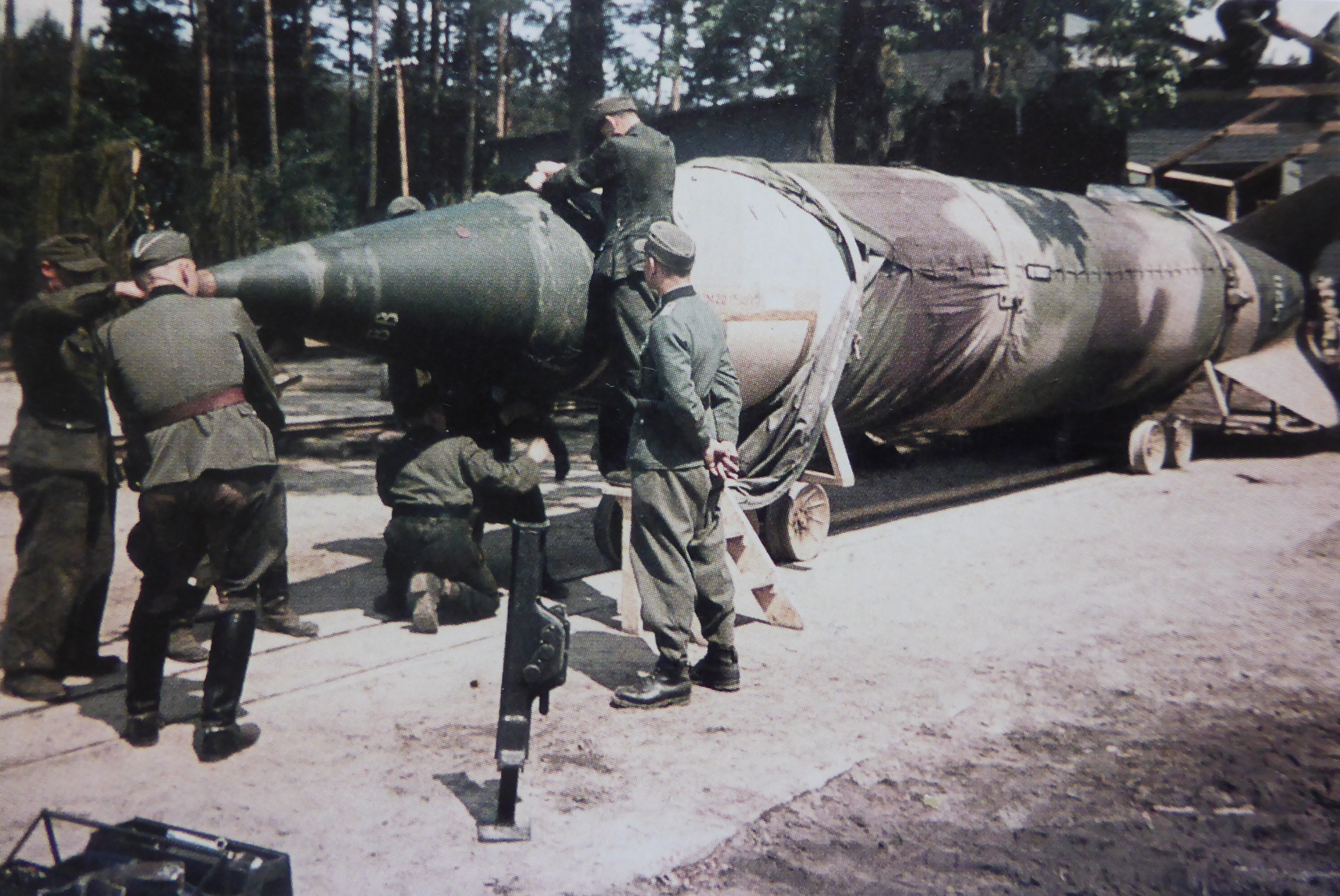
V-2 rocket in Blizna, 1943

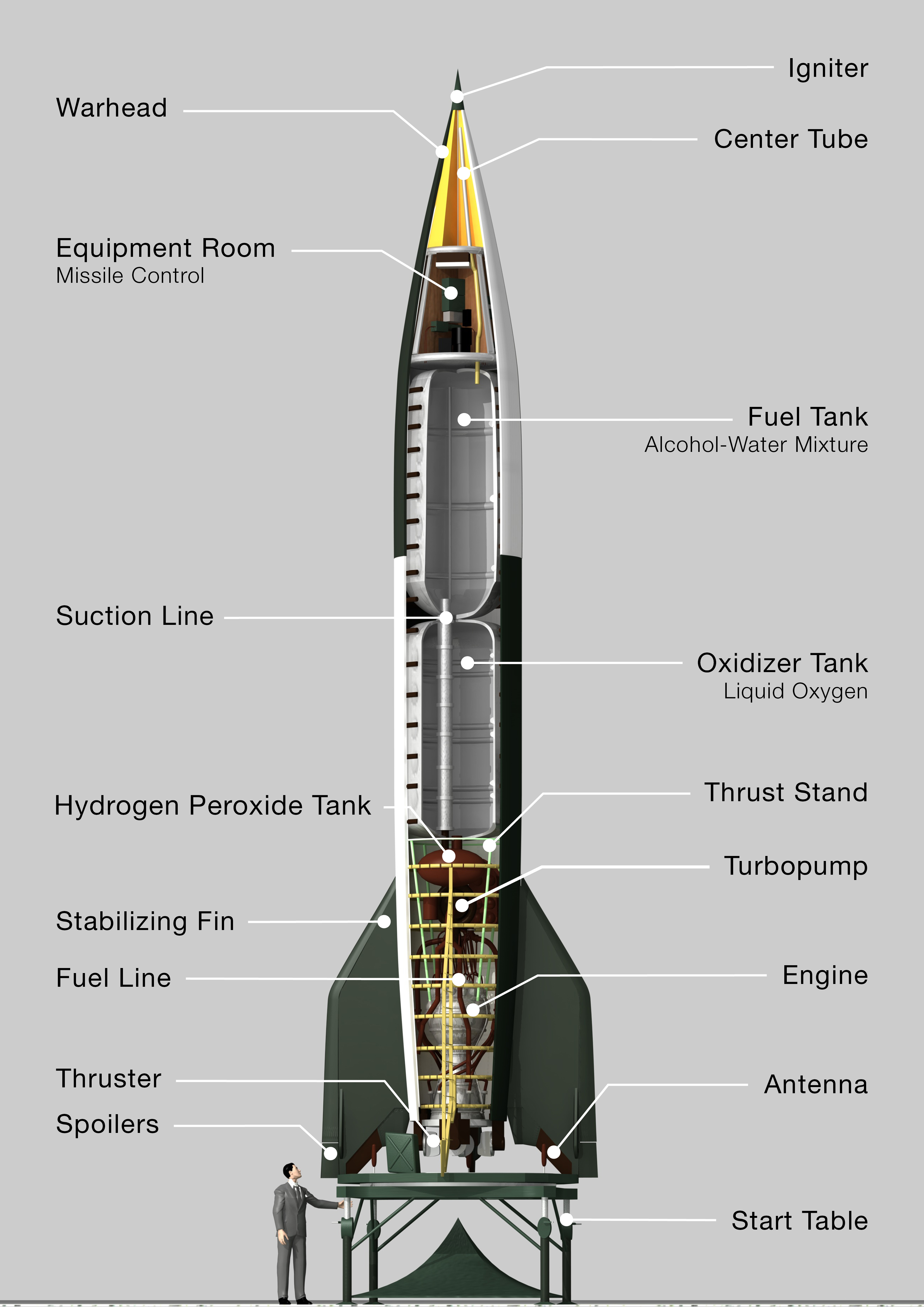
Layout of a V-2 rocket

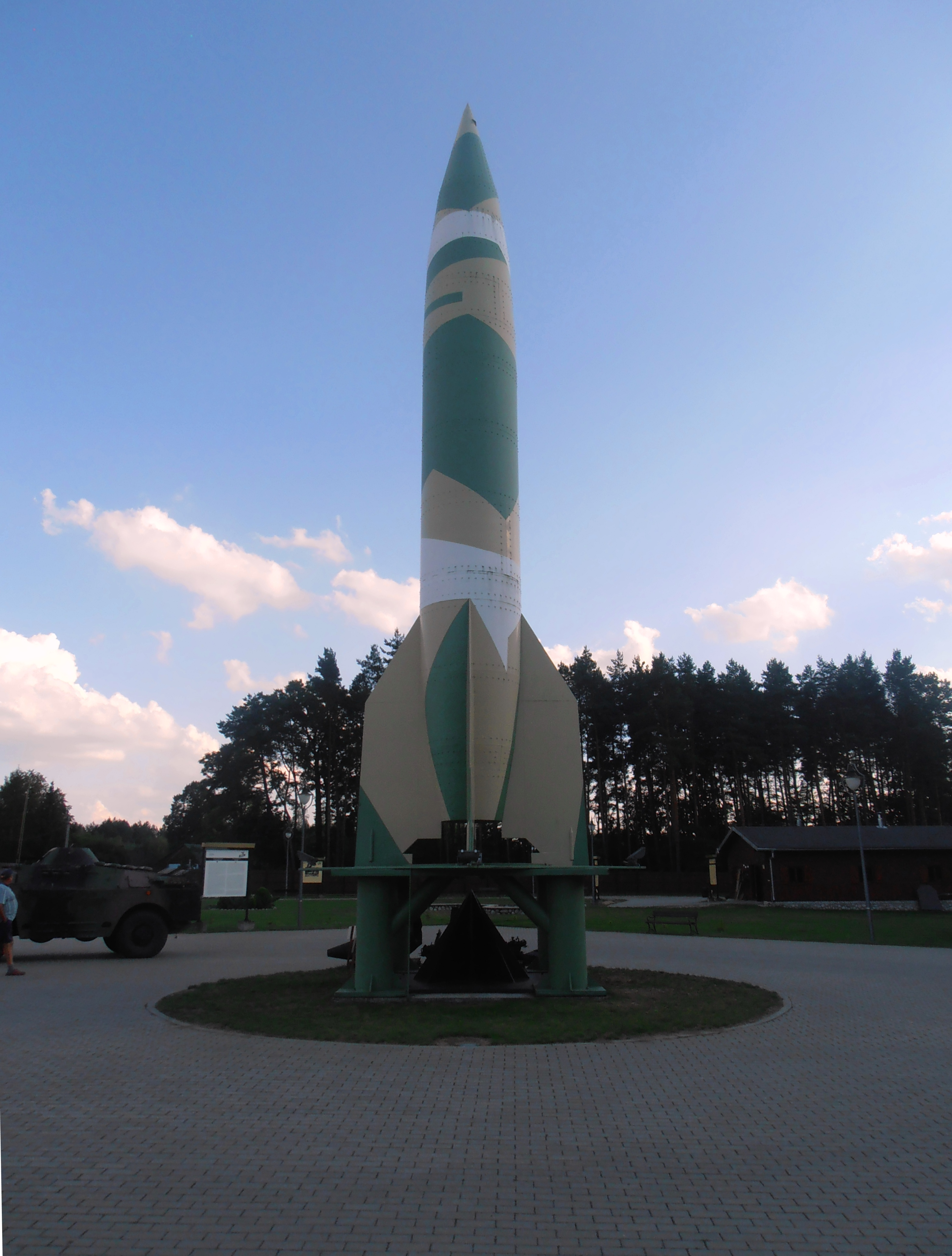
Replica V-2 missile in Blizna V-2 War Museum

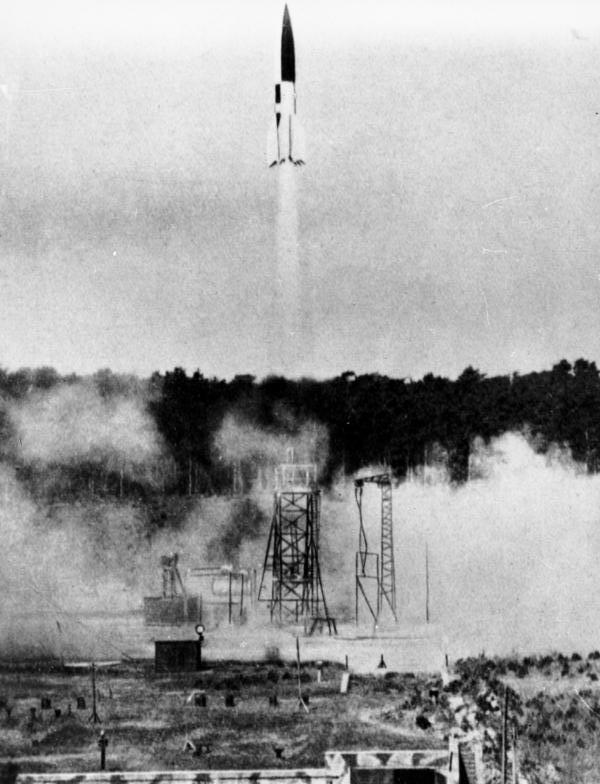
A V-2 missile being launched in summer 1943

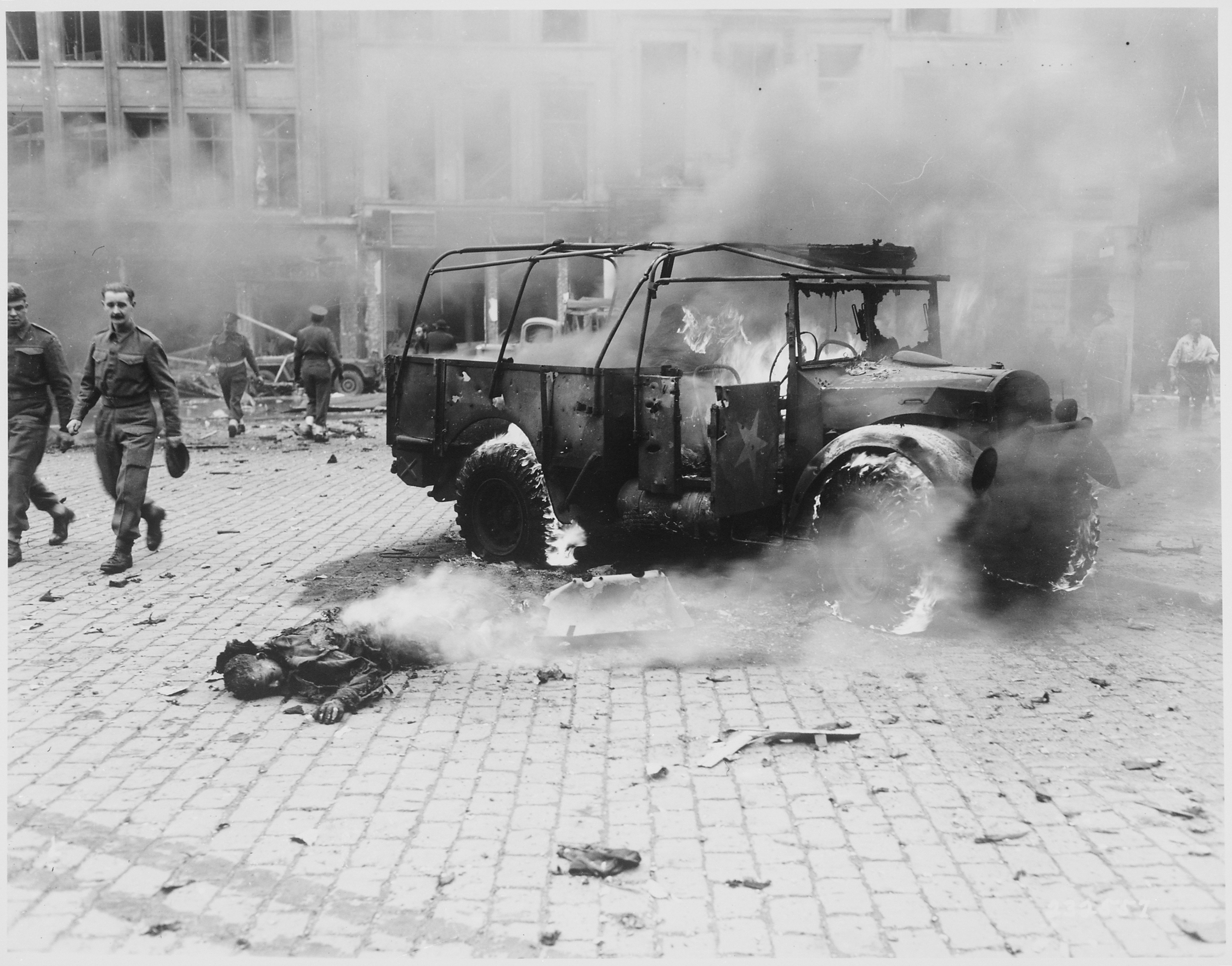
Aftermath of a V-2 rocket attack on the main intersection in Antwerp, Belgium, 27 November 1944

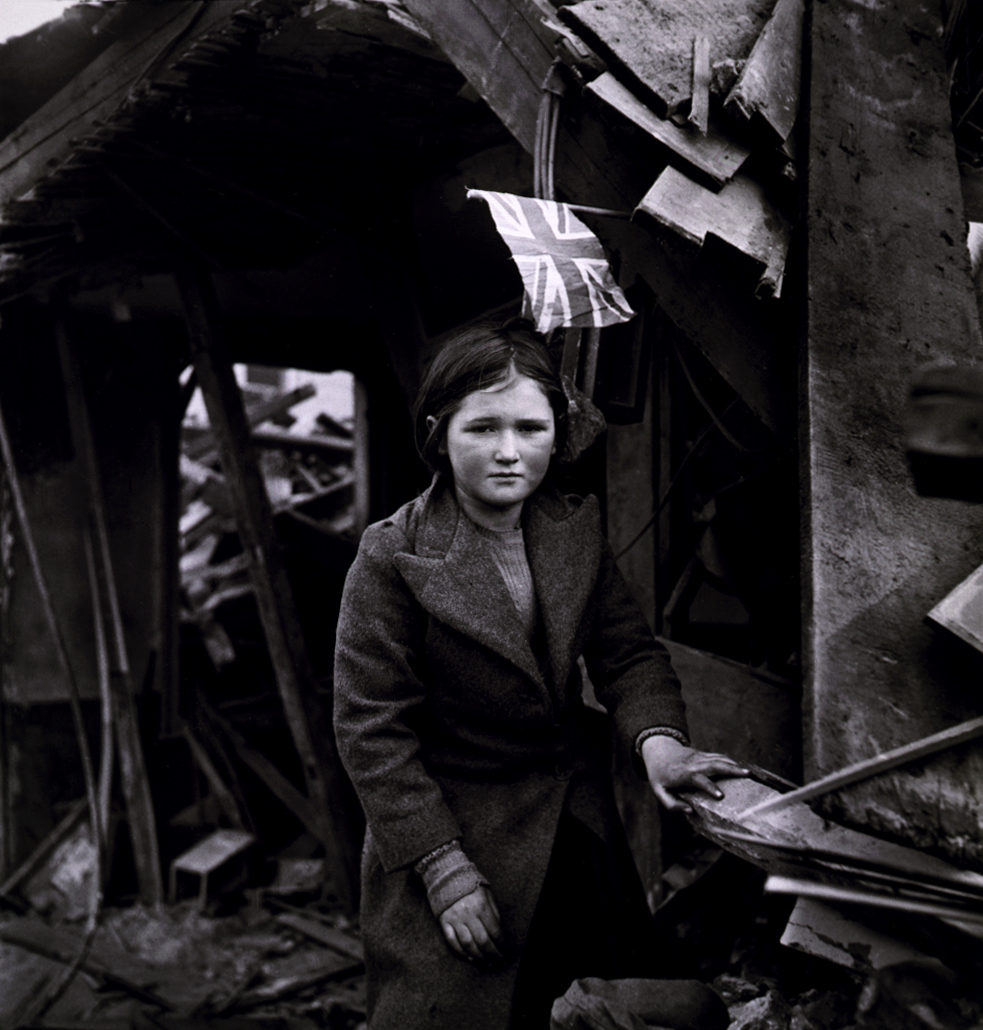
Aftermath of V-2 bombing at Battersea, London, 27 January 1945

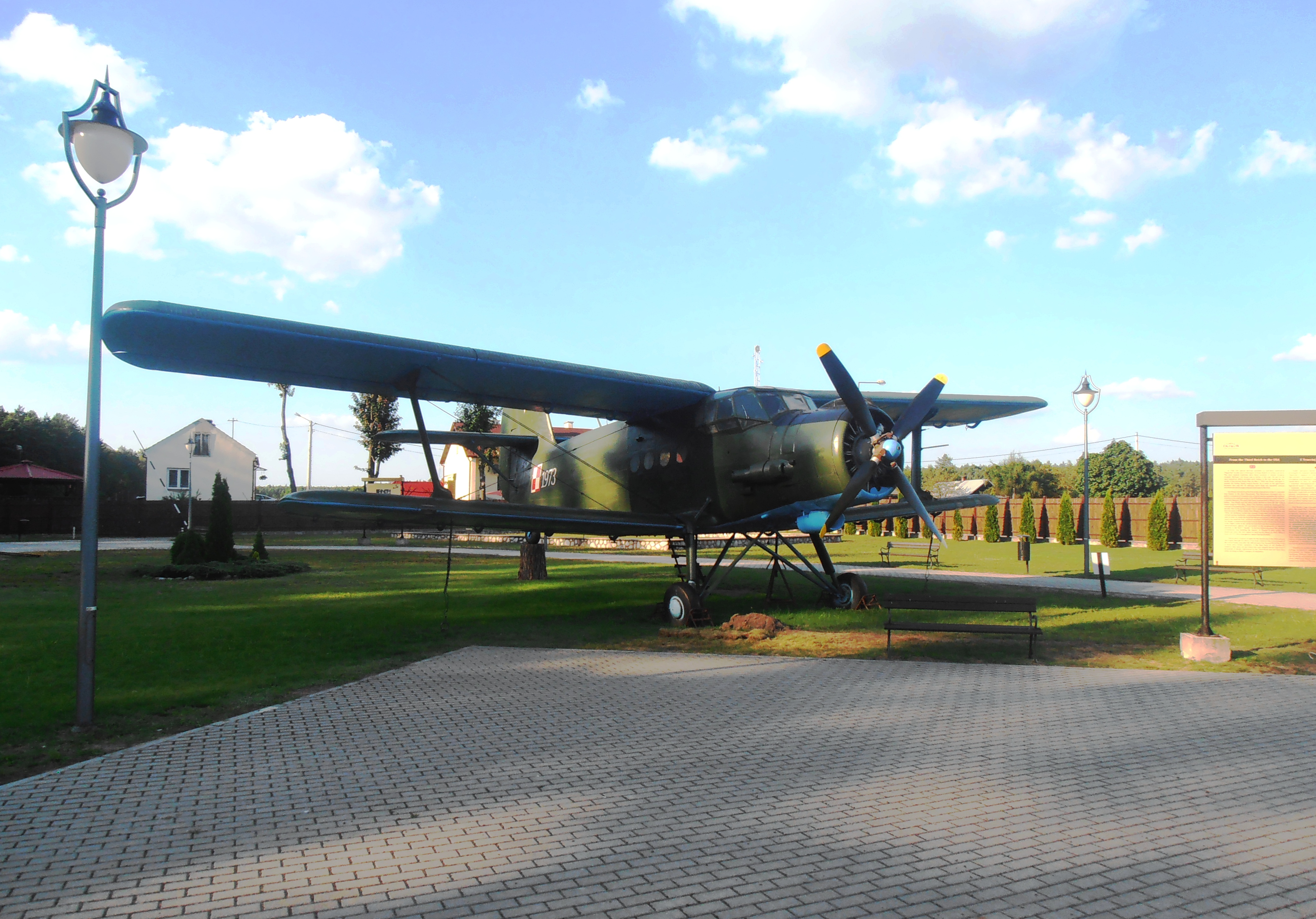
Post-war 1946 Russian Antonov An-2 aeroplane at Blizna V-2 Museum

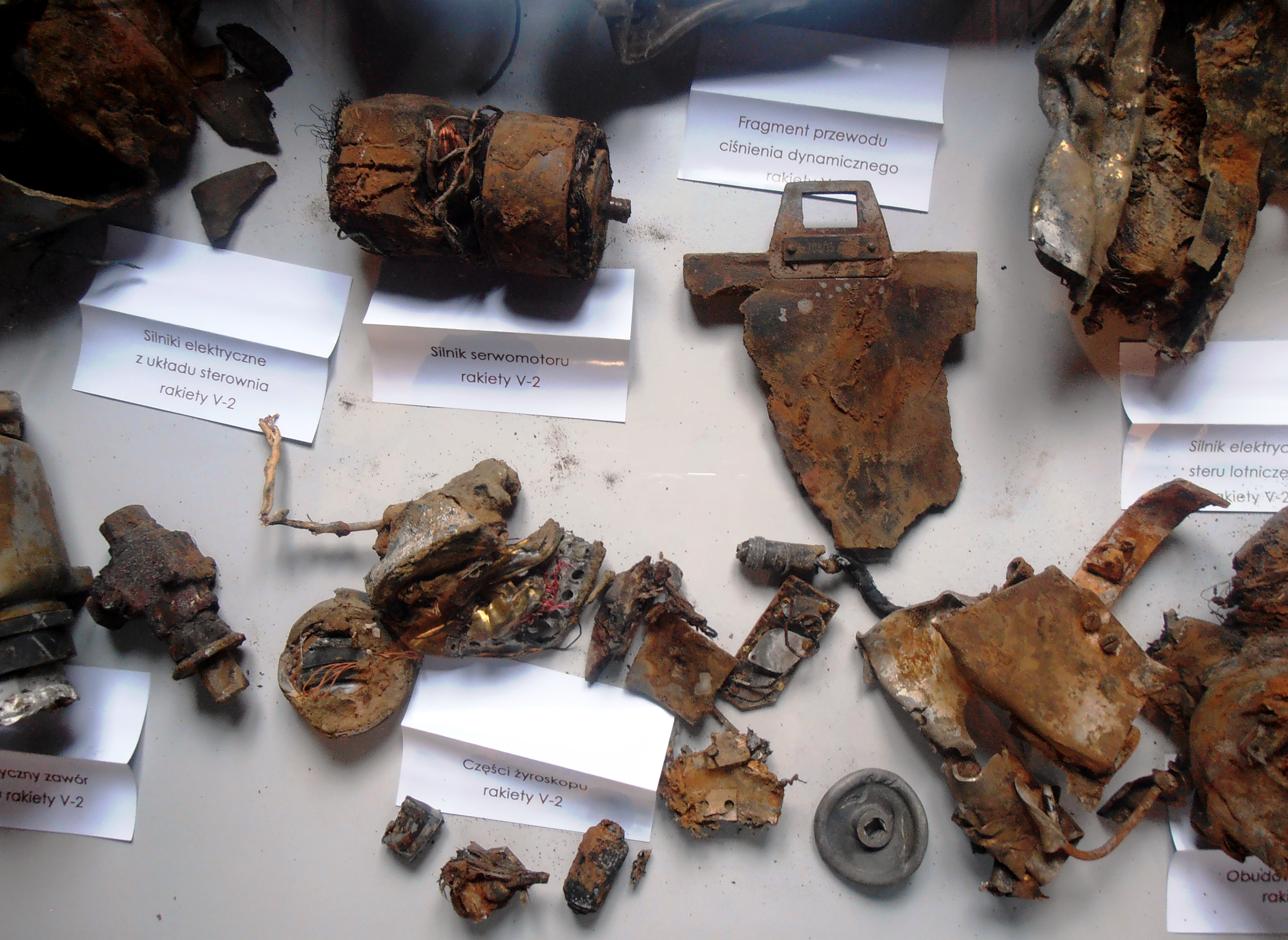
V-2 missile fragments Blizna V-2 War Museum

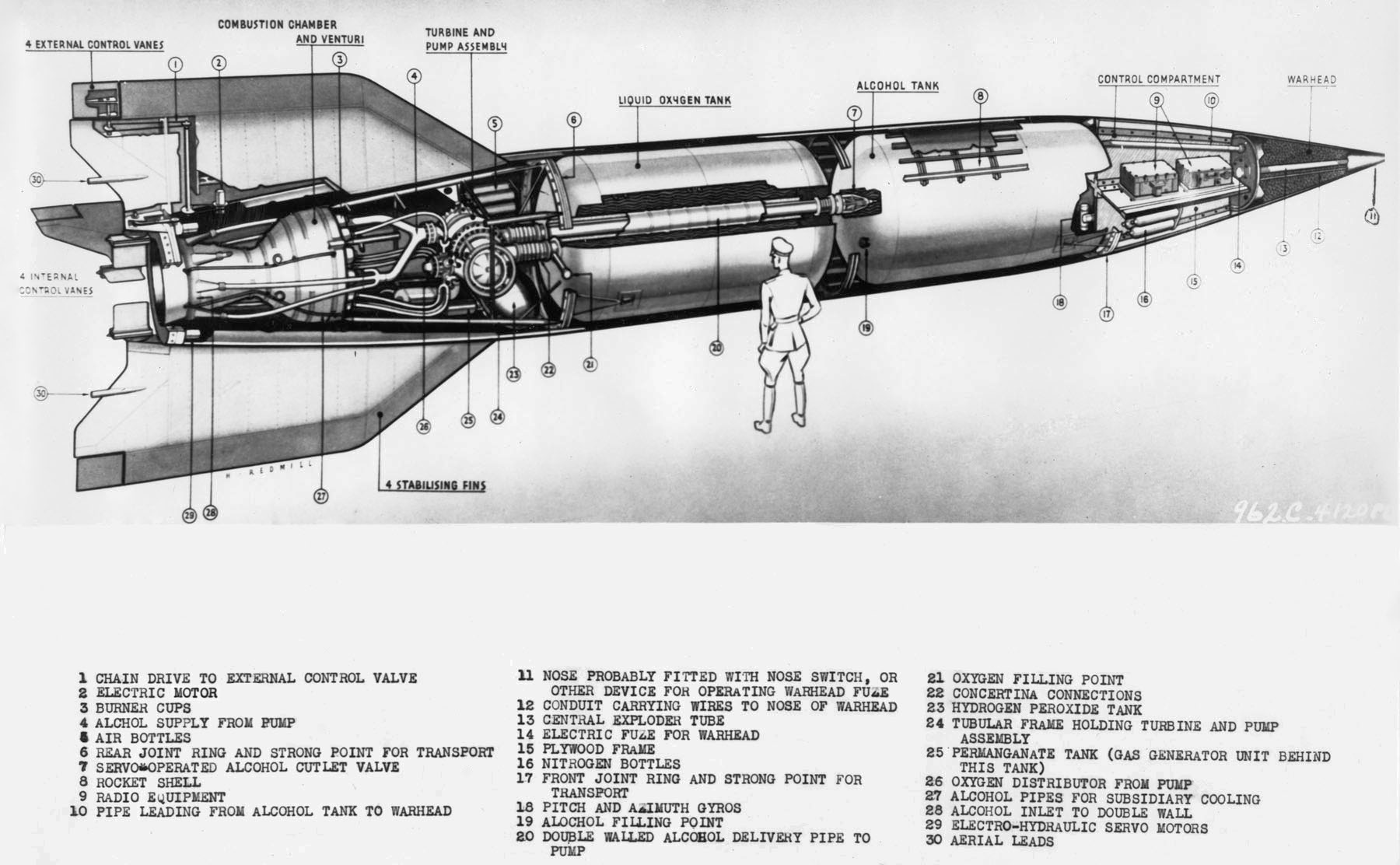
A US Army cut-away of the V-2

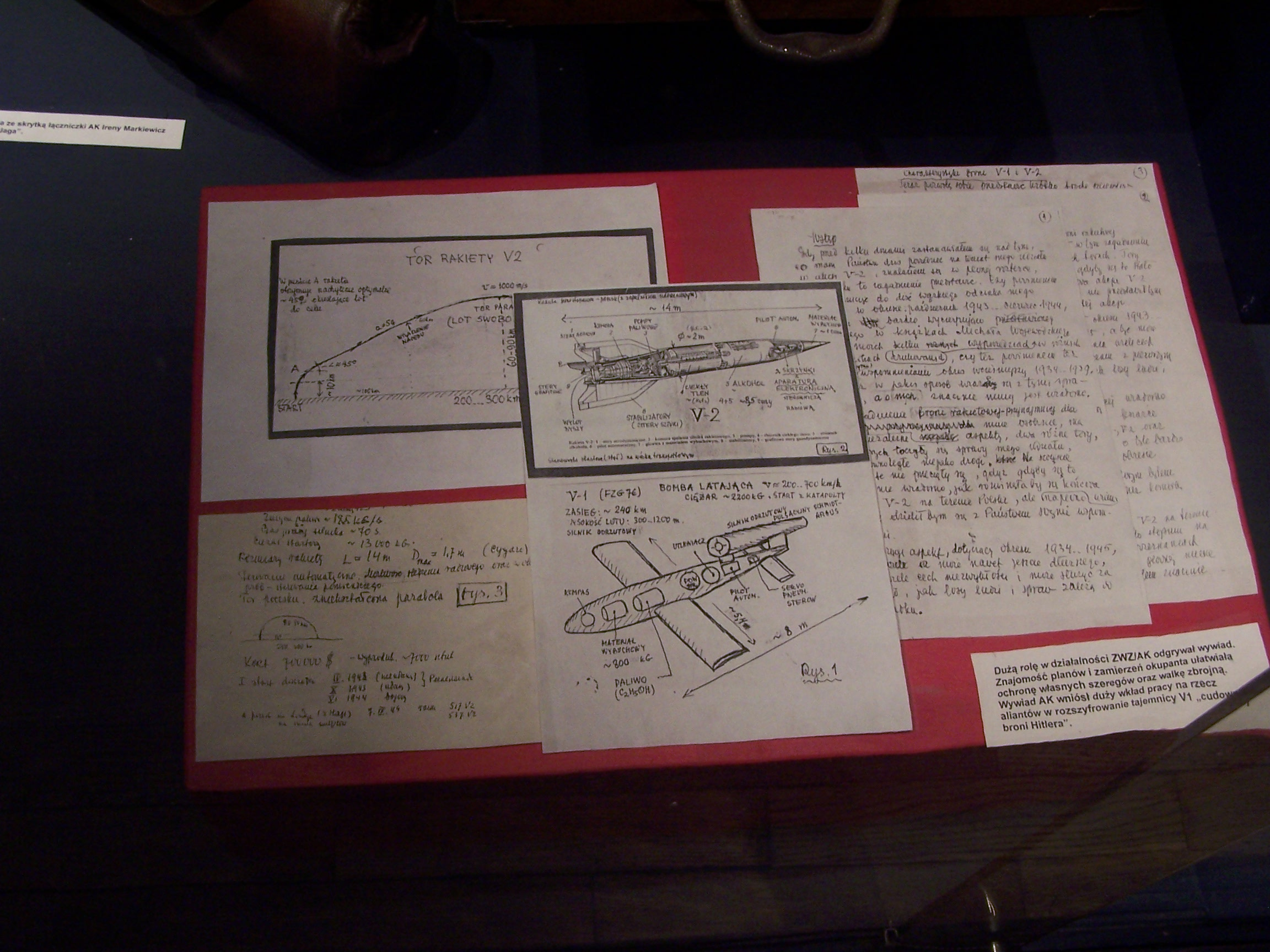
Home Army intelligence reports on V-1 and V-2 missiles
