= Polytechnic Square =

Urban square in Warsaw, Poland

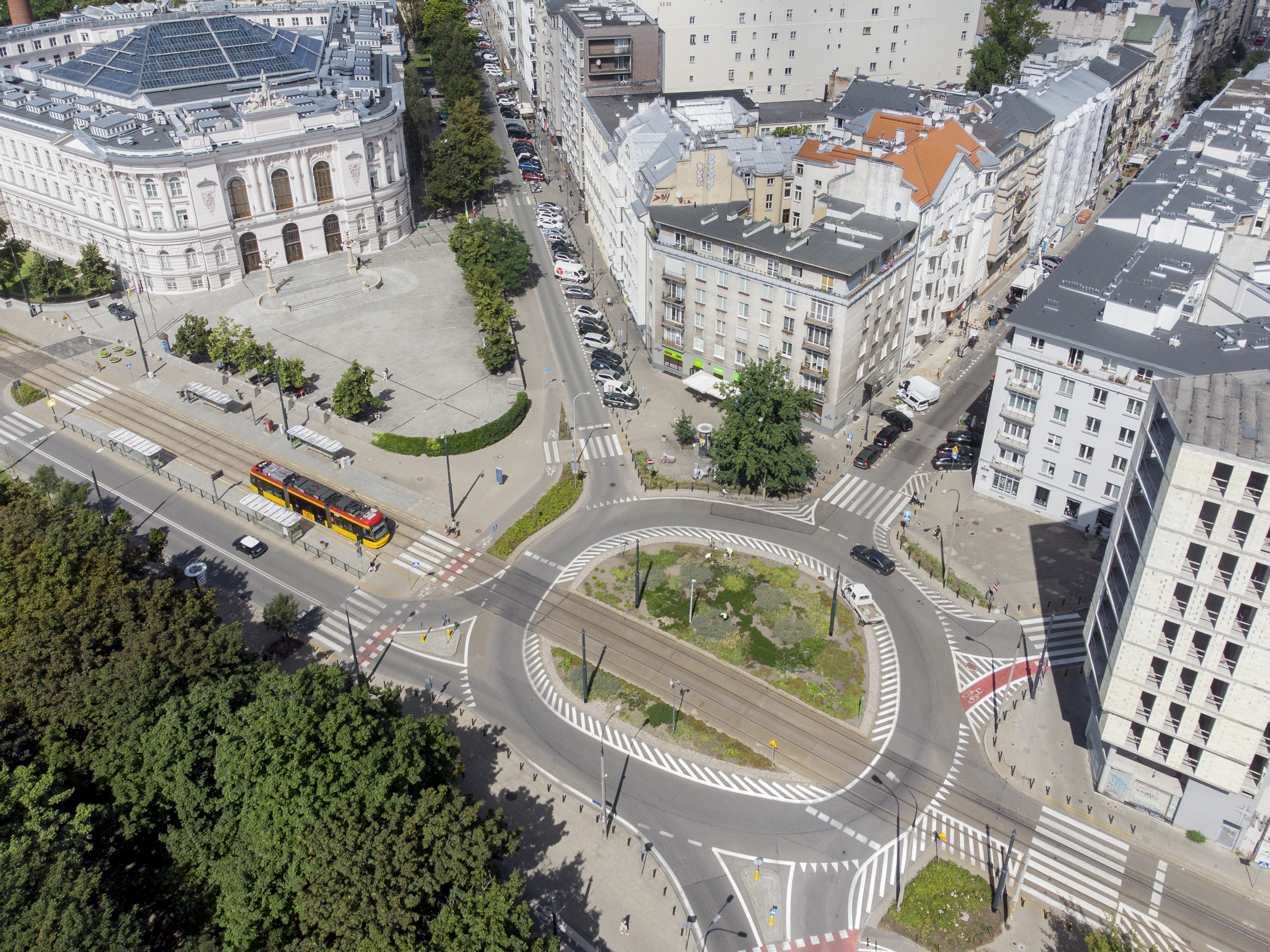
- The Polytechnic Square in 2022.

- Location within Warsaw
- Former name: Workers' Unity Square (1949–1989)
- Namesake: Warsaw University of Technology
- Location: Downtown, Warsaw, Poland
- Coordinates: 52°13′12.3″N 21°00′43.7″E
- North: Noakowskiego Street; Lwowska Street; Śniadeckich Street
- East: Nowowiejska Street
- South: Polna Street
- West: Nowowiejska Street

Construction
- Completion: 1768

Other
- Designer: Johann Christian Schuch

The Polytechnic Square (Polish: Plac Politechniki) is an urban square and a roundabout in Warsaw, Poland, within the Downtown district. It forms an intersection of Nowowiejska, Noakowskiego, Lwowska, Śniadeckich, and Polna Streets, within the neighbourhood of South Downtown. The square was constructed in 1768. The Main Building of the Warsaw University of Technology is placed next to it.

== History ==
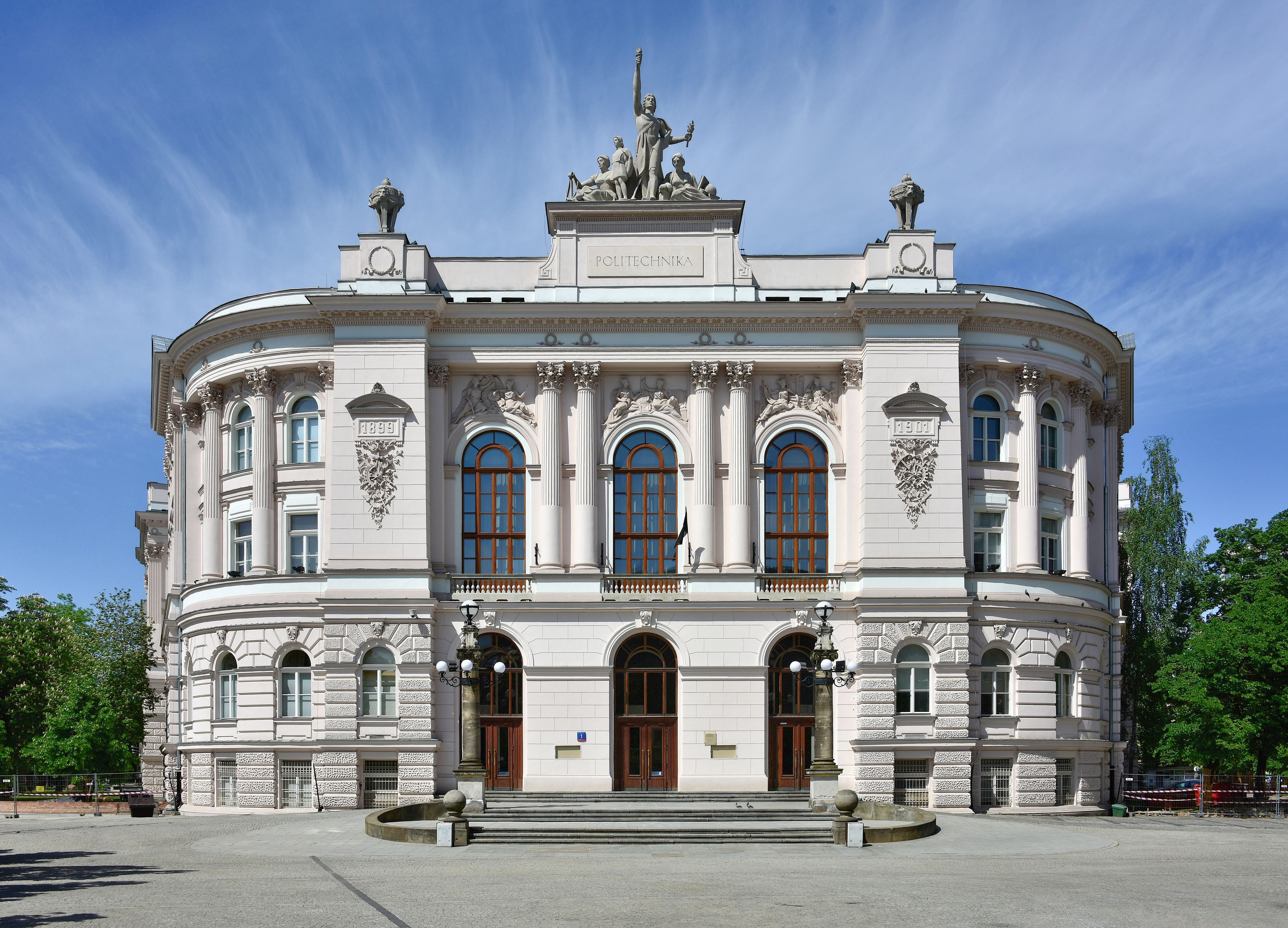
The Main Building of the Warsaw University of Technology, opened in 1901.

The construction of the urban square begun in 1768, as part of the Stanisław Axis, an urban layout consisting of five squares and roads, connecting Warsaw with Ujazdów Castle, developed from the initiative of king Stanisław August Poniatowski. It was designed by Johann Christian Schuch. The Polytechnic Square was placed on the Royal Route, and next to the Lubomirski Ramparts, a line of fortifications erected around the city.

In 1784, from the initiative of king Stanisław August Poniatowski, the settlement of Nowa Wieś (lit. 'New Village'), was developed alongside Nowowiejska Street, for the residents of the village of Ujazdów, displaced due to the construction of Ujazdów Castle in its place. It consisted of twelve houses, placed symmetrically on both sides of the street, located betweenthe Saviour Square and the Polytechnic Square.

At the turn of the 20th century, the tenements were developed around the northeastern side of the square. Due to the presence of the Lubomirski Ramparts on the other side, it remained undeveloped until their removal in 1916. In 1901, Main Building of the Warsaw University of Technology was opened at the square.

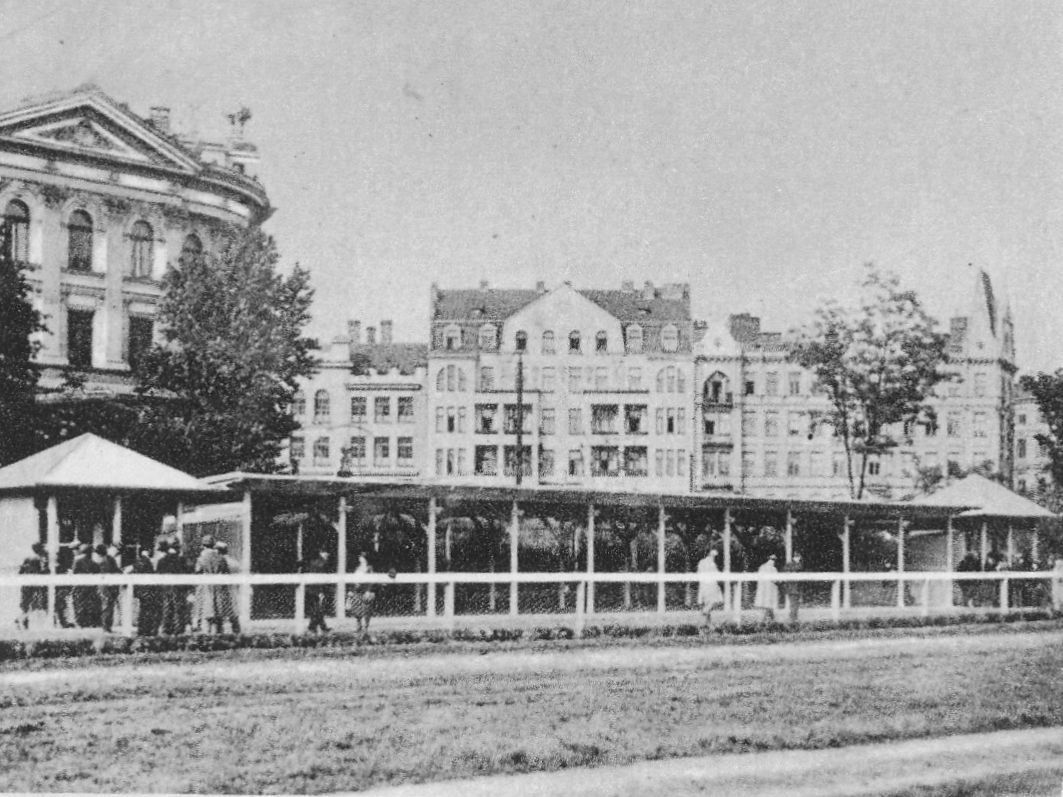
The Mokotów Field Racecourse in the 1930s.

In 1887, Mokotów Field Racecourse was opened on Polna Street, to the south of the square. In 1895, the first annual Great Warsaw Race, which became the most prestigious horce race in Poland, was held there. The venue was closed down in 1938.

A portion of the tenements were destroyed during the Second World War, and were later replaced with new residencial buildings. Between 15 and 19 December 1949, the Main Building of the Warsaw University of Technology hosted the congress during which the Polish Workers' Party and the Polish Socialist Party merged, forming the Polish United Workers' Party, a ruling socialist party in Poland. To commemorative this event, on 19 December 1949, the until-then unnamed square was given the name of the Workers' Unity Square (Polish: Plac Jedności Robotniczej).

In 1964, the building of the Faculty of Electronics and Information Technology of the Warsaw University of Technology was opened at the square.

In 1989, the square was renamed to Polytechnic Square after the nearby university. On 30 November 1991, a monument was unveiled in front of the Faculty of Electronics and Information Technology, next to the square. It was designed by Marek Łypaczewski, and is dedicated to the academics of the Warsaw University of Technology, who took part in the Home Army intelligence operation to decipher the radio guide systems of the V-1 and V-2 rocket projectiles used by the Wehrmacht during the Second World War. In 2007, an information board was erected next to the monument, with the information about the intelligence operation.

== Characteristics ==
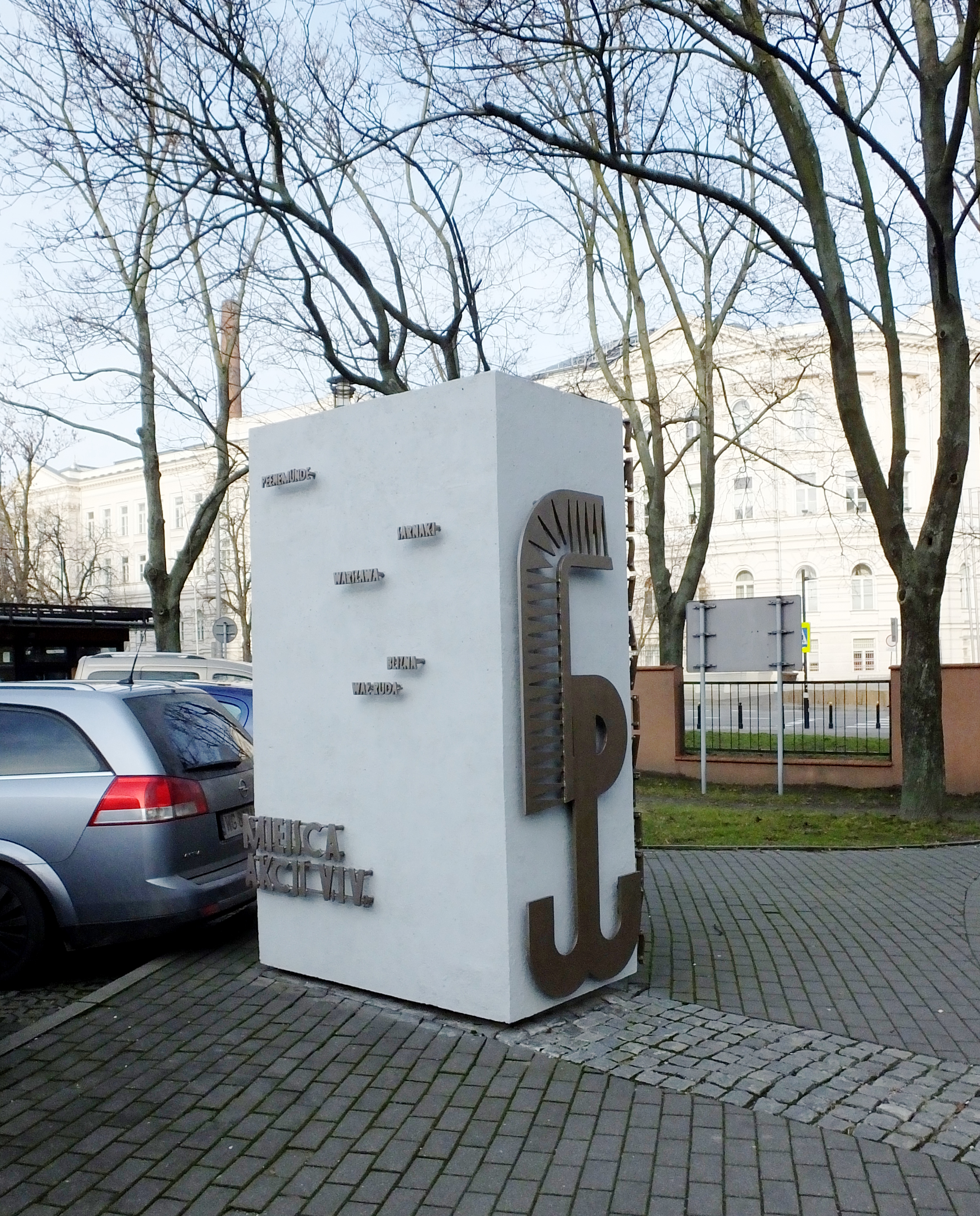
The Operation V-1 and V-2 Memorial.

The Polytechnic Square is a roundabout forming an intersection of Nowowiejska, Noakowskiego, Lwowska, Śniadeckich, and Polna Streets. A tram line also runs through Nowowiejska Street. On its northeastern side, between Noakowskiego and Polna Streets, is surrounded by tenement buildings. To the northwest, it is borderd by the Main Building of the Warsaw University of Technology, and to the south, the building of the Faculty of Electronics and Information Technology.

To the south, the square is bordered by a small urban park named the Marek Trzciński Park (Polish: Park im. Marka Trzcińskiego) after a 20th- and 21st-century engineer and politician.

The Operation V-1 and V-2 Memorial is placed at the square in front of the Faculty of Electronics and Information Technology, and next to the park. It commemorates the academics of the Warsaw University of Technology, who took part in the Home Army intelligence operation to decipher the radio guide systems of the V-1 and V-2 rocket projectiles used by the Wehrmacht during the Second World War. The monument was designed by Marek Łypaczewski, and unveiled in 1991.
