= Blizna, Subcarpathian Voivodeship =

Blizna
- Village
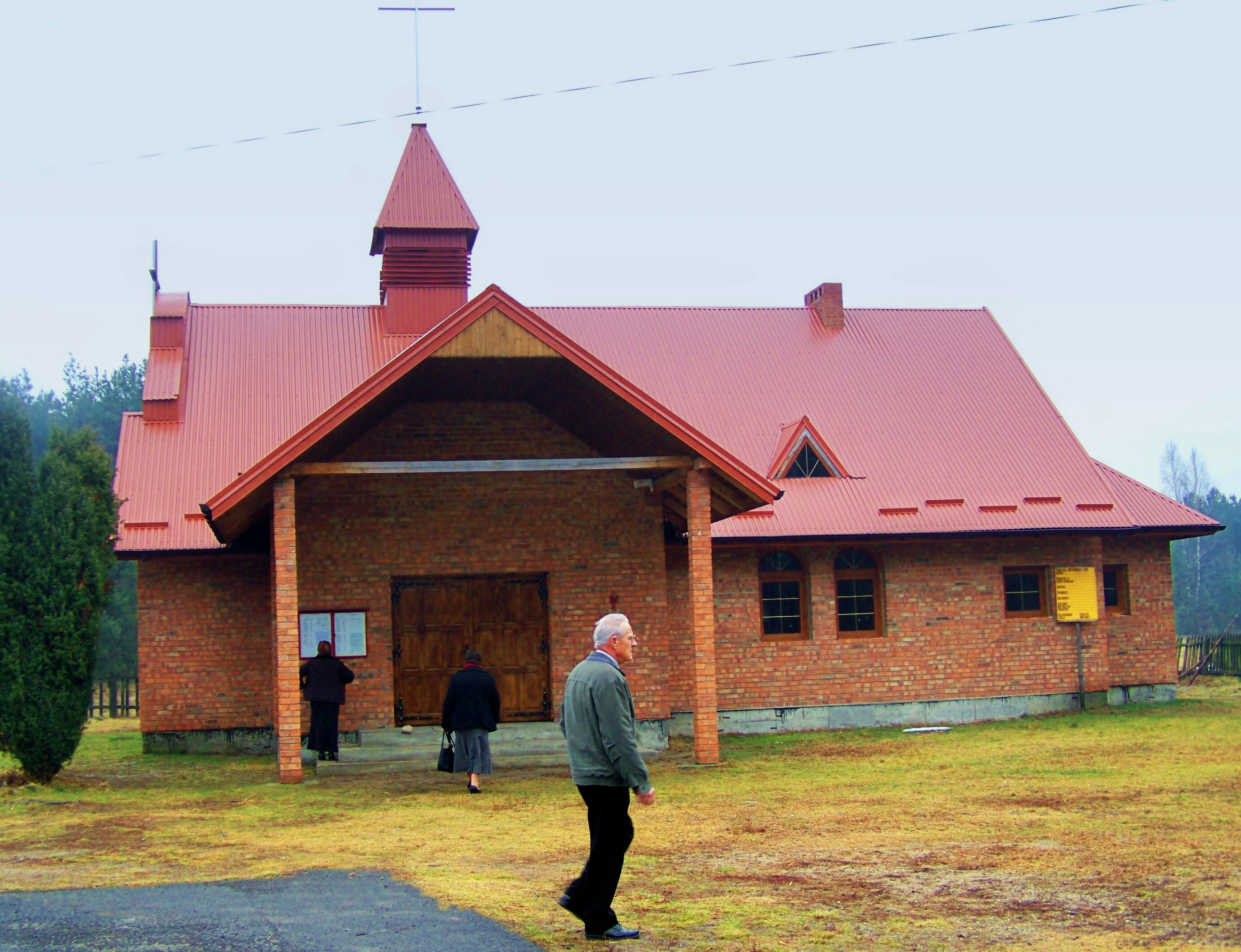
- Church in Blizna

- Location within Poland
- Coordinates: 50°11′N 21°36′E
- Country: Poland
- Voivodeship: Subcarpathian
- County: Ropczyce-Sędziszów
- Gmina: Ostrów
- Elevation: 200 m (660 ft)
- Population: 250

Blizna [ˈblizna] is a village in the administrative district of Gmina Ostrów, within Ropczyce-Sędziszów County, Subcarpathian Voivodeship, in south-eastern Poland.

== History ==
=== World War II ===
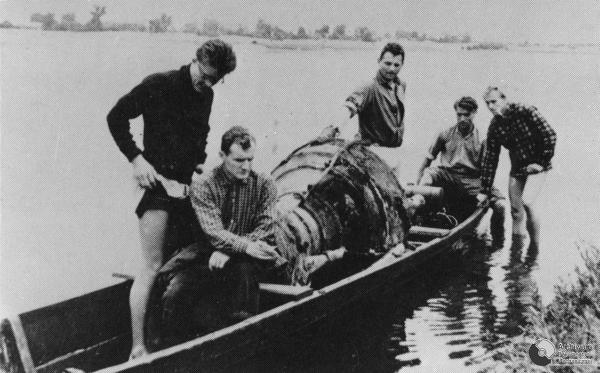
V-2 rocket being recovered from the Bug River near Sarnaki

From 5 November 1943 to early July 1944 there was an SS military base near Blizna, from which 139 A4 (also known as V-2) rockets were launched for experimental purposes and for training. After the air raid on Peenemünde on 17 August 1943 it was decided that the training and testing should be done in southeast Poland outside of the range of the Allied bombers. However test launches also continued at Peenemuende until 21 February 1945.

Because the rockets launched from Blizna - in contrast to the rockets launched from Peenemünde - flew over a populated area, there was also some destruction of buildings. Wernher von Braun, a central figure in Germany's pre-war rocket development program, and post-war director of NASA's Marshall Space Flight Center, worked at the Blizna test site and personally visited the test missile impact areas to troubleshoot any problems discovered during trials.

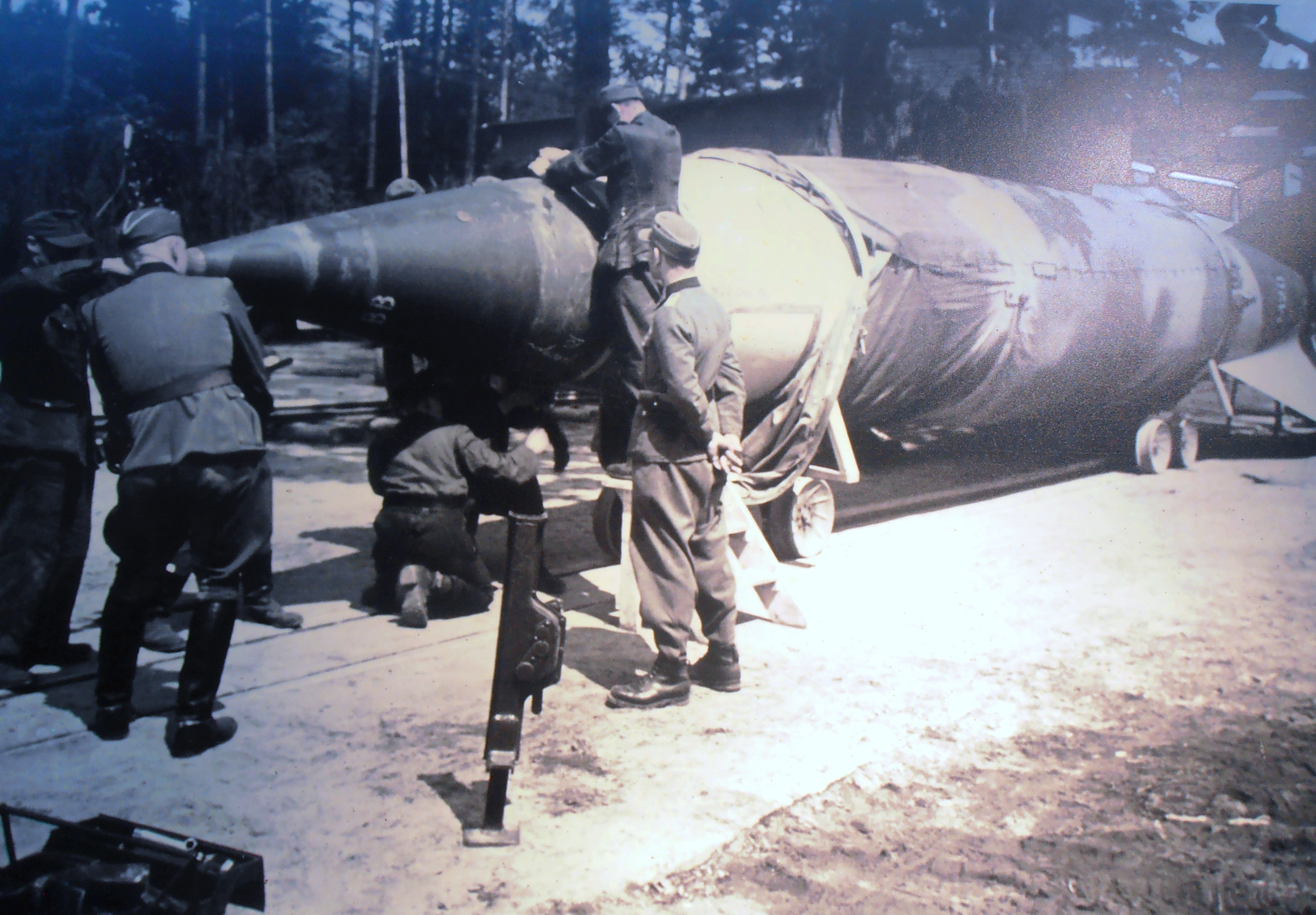
V-2 rocket in Blizna

The missile testing ground at Blizna was quickly located by the Polish resistance movement, the Armia Krajowa thanks to reports from local farmers. Armia Krajowa field agents even managed to obtain pieces of the fired rockets, by arriving on the scene before German patrols. In early March 1944, British Intelligence Headquarters received a report of an Armia Krajowa agent (code name: ‘Makary’) who had covertly surveyed the Blizna railway line and observed a freight car heavily guarded by SS troops containing ‘an object which, though covered by a tarpaulin, bore every resemblance to a monstrous torpedo’. Subsequently, a plan was formed to make an attempt to capture a whole unexploded V-2 rocket and transport it to Britain. Around 20 May 1944, a relatively undamaged V-2 rocket fell on the swampy bank of the Bug River near the village of Sarnaki and local Poles managed to hide it before German arrival. The rocket was then dismantled and smuggled across Poland. In late July 1944, the Polish resistance (Home Army and V1 and V2) secretly transported parts of the rocket out of Poland in Operation Most III (Bridge III), for analysis by British intelligence.

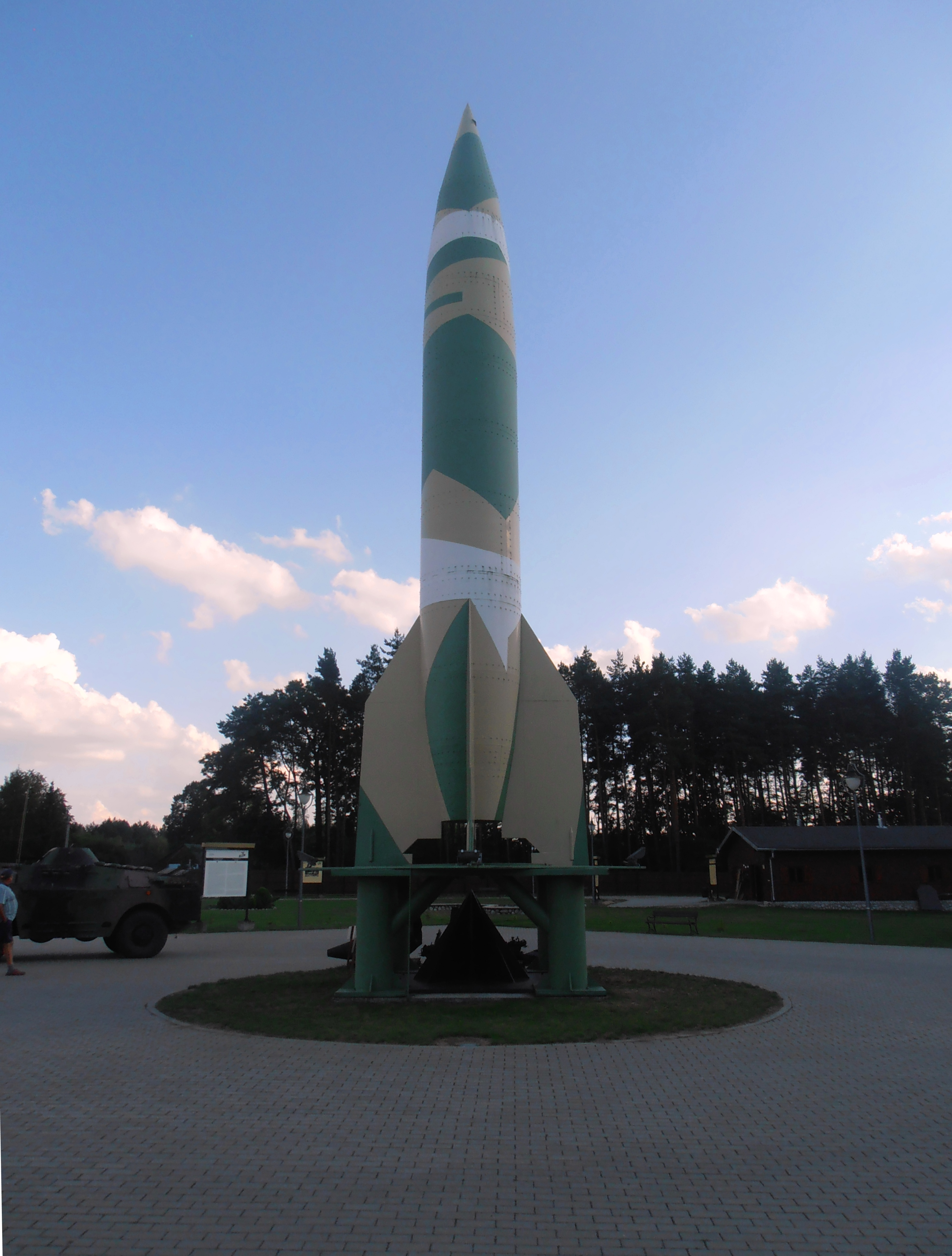
replica V2 missile in Blizna V-2 War Museum.

In July 1944 the advance of Soviet troops forced the base at Blizna to be evacuated and launch activities were moved to the Tuchola Forest.

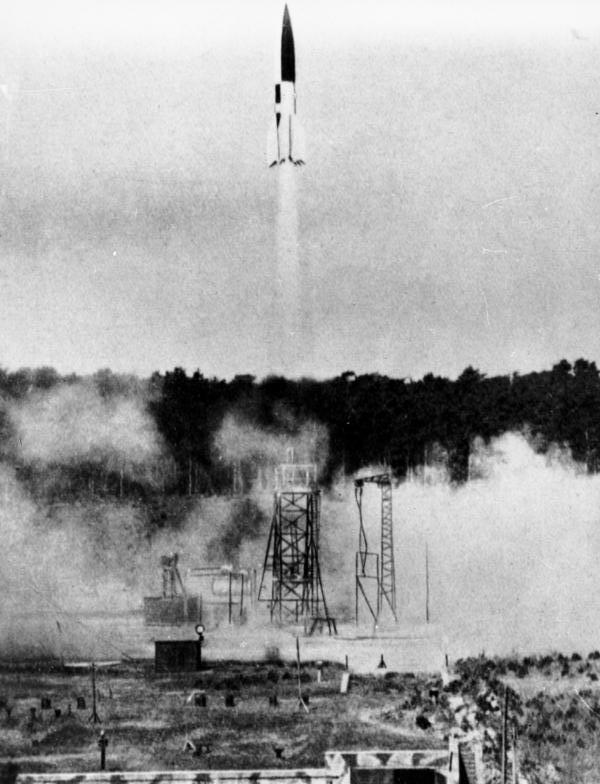
A V-2 missile being launched in Summer 1943

=== Bibliography ===
- Zak, Anatoly (9 March 2009). "V-2 tests in Poland". russianspaceweb.com/. Archived from the original on 2009-11-10.
- "List of V-2 test missile launches from Blizna". jena1806.com. Archived from the original on 2011-07-13.*Gatland, Kenneth William (1958). Project Satellite. John W. Wood (First ed.). London: Wingate. p. 169. OCLC 1183846. OL 6241939M.
- King, Benjamin; Kutta, Timothy (15 July 2003). Impact: The History of Germany's V-Weapons in World War II. Da Capo Press. ISBN 978-0-306-81292-7.
- Władysław Góra, Wojna i okupacja ziemiach na Polskich 1939–1945, Wydawnictwo Książka i Wiedza, Warsaw 1984, ISBN 83-05-11290-X
