= Antoni Kocjan =

Polish pilot and resistance member (1902-1944)

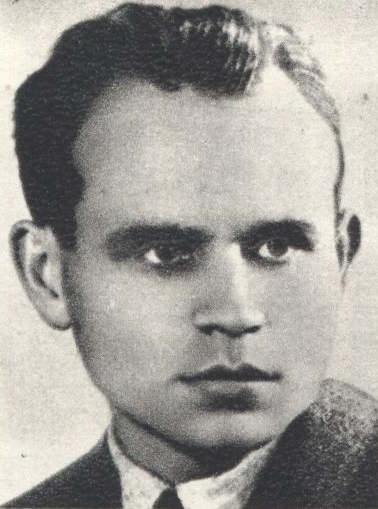
- Born: 12 August 1902; Skalskie
- Died: 13 August 1944 (aged 42); KL Auschwitz

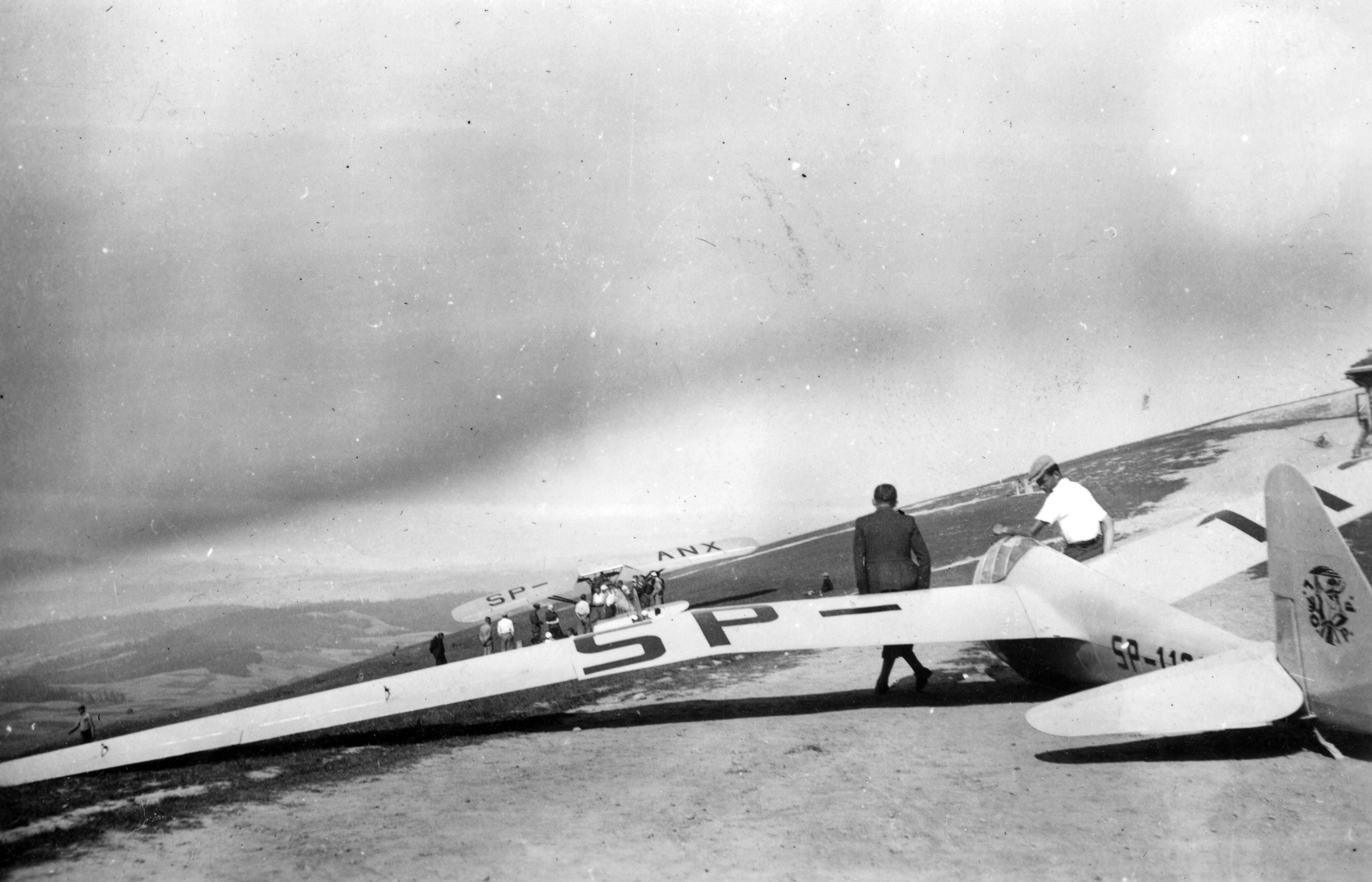
Orlik 2 waiting for a launch

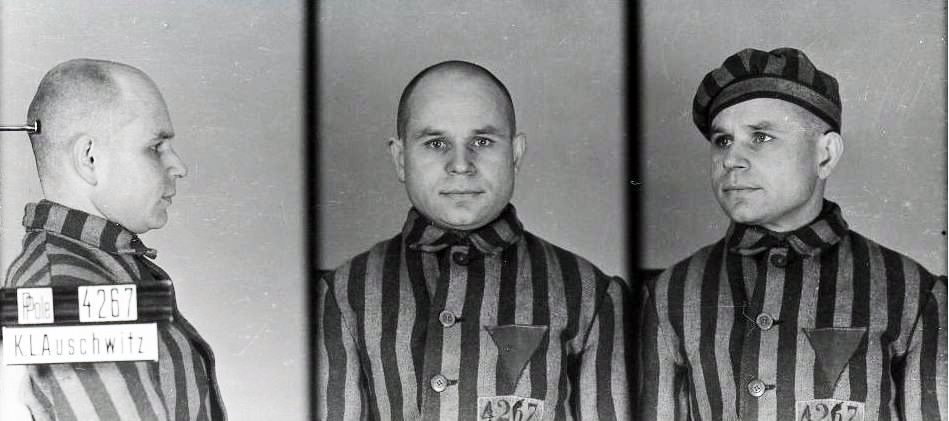
Antoni Kocjan in Nazi concentration camps KL Auschwitz 1940

Antoni Kocjan (12 August 1902 – 13 August 1944) was a renowned Polish glider constructor and a contributor to the intelligence services of the Polish Home Army during World War II.

== Early life and education ==
Antoni was the son of Michal Kocjan and Franciszka Zurowska, born in the village of Skalskie near Olkusz. He finished the Gymnasium of Casimir III in Olkusz in 1923 and served in the army during the Polish-Soviet war. Subsequently, he studied at the Warsaw University of Technology in the department of electrical engineering and aviation and at the Warsaw Agricultural University. He married Elizbieta Zanussi on 30 November 1939. During his studies he collaborated with the plane constructors of group RWD.

In 1929 he finished a pilot's course and in 1930 won the second award at the Young Pilot's Championship. Later he was part of crew in flights on the airplanes RWD-2 and RWD-7, which beat the world's height record. In 1931 he obtained an engineer's degree and began work at the Experimental Aviation Workshops in Warsaw. In the same year he constructed his first plane "Czajka", a trainer glider that was later put into serialized production in several designs.

== Glider Experience ==
Kocjan became the head constructor of the Glider Workshops on the Mokotów Field in Warsaw in 1932. While there he designed the training glider "Wrona" and in 1933 the training-sport glider "Komar". These three successful gliders and their improved versions, "Czajka-bis", "Wrona-bis" and "Komar-bis", became mass-produced in Poland and in lesser quantities under license abroad in Estonia, Finland, Yugoslavia, Bulgaria, and Palestine. In 1934 Kocjan designed a trainer glider "Sroka" that was also built in significant numbers. Subsequently, he designed the aerobatic glider "Sokol" and in 1936, together with Szczepan Frzeszczyk, the aerobatic glider "Mewa". In 1937 he built his most known single-person aerobatic glider "Orlik". The version "Orlik 3" took second place in the competition of standard gliders for the anticipated 1940 Summer Olympics. The version "Orlik 2" in the years 1948-49 was piloted by the American Paul MacCready on which he set the world's height record for gliders of 9,600 metres (31,500 feet). In 1937 Kocjan also designed the motor glider "Bąk" of which ten units were built. The production of "Komar" was also renewed after the war.

== Polish Underground State ==
In the first days of World War II, Kocjan was wounded by bomb shrapnel. After the Nazi occupation of Poland in 1939, he became a soldier of the underground ZWZ which later became the Home Army. On 19 September 1940 he was caught in a street raid and sent to Auschwitz concentration camp. However, he was released after ten months.

He was characterized by a large degree of daring in planning of actions of the Polish resistance, particularly in connection to the underground production of weapons. He made a significant contribution to the identification of Peenemünde as the testing site of the German Wunderwaffen and worked out the technical nature of the V-2 rocket.

Antoni Kocjan proved paramount in his involvement with the Polish Home Army. On June 13, 1940, a Wasserfall antiaircraft rocket, a secret missile also built by the Germans at Peenemünde East, equipped with a revolutionary radio system that gave it remote control capabilities landed in Malmö, a city located in the south of Sweden - a neutral country during World War II. The Swedish authorities were quickly notified and in response, the Swedish Air Force guarded the impact site and the Wasserfall rocket. On July 10, about a month later, Stewart Menzies, Chief of MI-6 in London at the time was informed of the rocket in Sweden and upon knowledge of its German authenticity, immediately began negotiations with Swedish administrators to retrieve the rocket. An agreement was finally made that in return for the rocket, the British were to supply the Swedish army with two squadrons of tanks.

As a result, the British scientists had finally found what they had been desperately searching for - a complete German missile. Once deconstructed and reconstructed, British scientists analyzed the radio system on the missile and came to the false conclusion that the German V-2 rocket would be equipped with the same radio technology, allowing pinpoint accuracy in hitting enemy targets (the Allies) due to its remote control abilities. Unbeknownst to the British, the radio system wasn't actually for remote control, but designed simply for receiving and transmitting signals. Nevertheless, the British scientists believed that they could develop a radio beam that could deflect an approaching V-2 rocket off-course. In order for this to occur, the scientists needed an actual V-2 missile from the Germans, an impossible request. In need of help, MI-6 sent an urgent request to the Polish Underground Headquarters in Warsaw, Poland asking if they could send a V-2 rocket, or even parts of one. Although a brazen demand, coincidentally a V-2 rocket that was launched at the Blizna V-2 missile launch site landed in the swampy bank of Poland's Bug River and had failed to explode. The missile was found and reported by a farmer who lived by the Bug River. This news was sent to the Polish Home Army and Kocjan quickly rushed to the Bug River to photograph the V-2 and hide it with foliage to avoid its discovery by German patrols. Kocjan's new mission was to steal key parts of the V-2 to be sent to the British for analysis. Accompanied by other Polish scientists and to avoid detection by German patrols, Kocjan worked through most of the night and with the help of draft horses, successfully removed the V-2 rocket from the swampy bank of the Bug River. The scientists proceeded to remove the engine and steering components of the V-2, dismantled the parts at a nearby barn and lifted them onto two trucks covered by a large quantity of potatoes. On the drive back to Warsaw, their vehicles were stopped and searched at three different roadblocks but none of the missile compartments were found and they were permitted into Warsaw. The first phase of the dangerous mission was complete thanks to Antoni Kocjan. The second phase involved the smuggling of the key components of the V-2 rocket out of Warsaw, into London. The code name for this new operation was deemed Wildhorn III.

On 2 June 1944, Antoni Kocjan was arrested together with his wife and imprisoned in the Pawiak prison. The Gestapo murdered him on 13 August in the last group of forty prisoners of Pawiak during the Warsaw Uprising.

== See also ==
- Home Army and V1 and V2
