= Wacław Struszyński =

Polish electronic engineer (1904–1980)

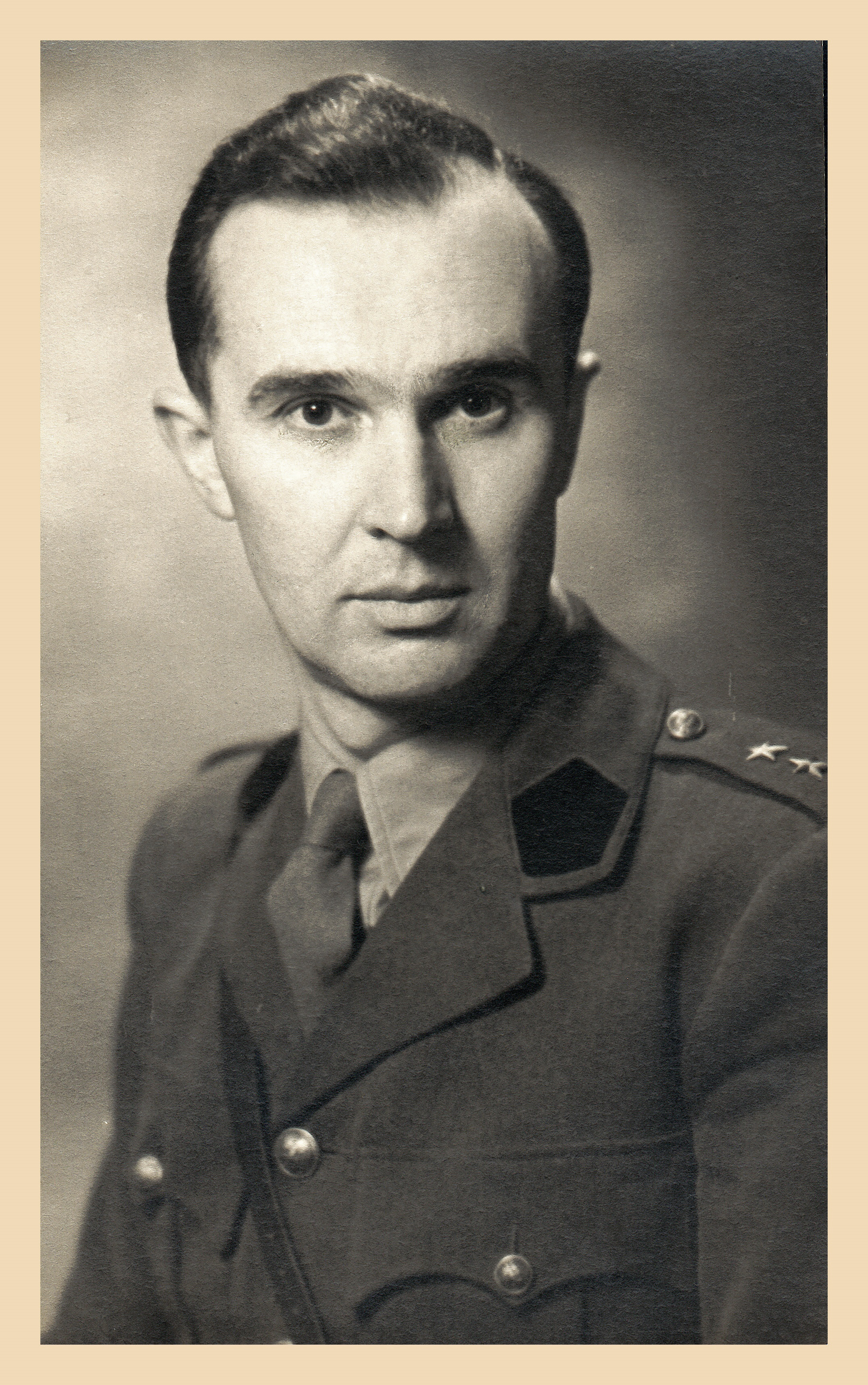
- Born: Wacław Struszyński; 1904; Wieruszów, Poland
- Died: 1980; Calgary, Canada
- Occupation: electronics engineer
- Known for: his contribution to the defeat of the U-boats in the Battle of the Atlantic
- Spouse: Jadwiga Struszyński

Wacław Struszyński (Polish: [ˈvat͡swaf struˈʂɨj̃skʲi]; 1904–1980) was a Polish electronics engineer who made a vital contribution to the defeat of U-boats in the Battle of the Atlantic. He designed an exceptional radio antenna which enabled effective high frequency (HF) radio direction finding systems to be installed on Royal Navy convoy escort ships. Such direction finding systems were referred to as HF/DF or Huff-Duff, and enabled the bearings of U-boats to be determined when the U-boats made high frequency radio transmissions.

== Early life ==
Struszynski was born in Wieruszów near Łódź (now in Poland) in 1904. He spent his youth in Moscow, but the family returned to Poland in 1918. He received his master's degree in Engineering (Dipl. Ing.) at the Warsaw University of Technology in 1929, and joined the Polish State Telecommunication Establishment, where he became head of the Direction Finding Division. When Poland was invaded in 1939, he was evacuated from Warsaw, and reached England in 1940.

Struszynski's father was chemist Professor Marceli Struszynski of the Warsaw University of Technology. During the Second World War, he worked with the Polish resistance, and analyzed the fuel used in the V2 rocket.

== Career ==
=== World War II ===
==== Radio direction finding and U-boat tracking ====
In World War II, the U-boat wolf packs were organised by high frequency radio, in which long range communication was achieved by the reflection of radio signals from the ionosphere. German radio signals were decoded at Bletchley Park in England (termed Ultra intelligence), and when this revealed the intentions of the U-boats, convoys could be routed to avoid them. However, the convoys always had to be prepared for possible attacks.

There was an urgent need for convoy escort ships to know the bearings of U-boats, by determining the direction of the source of their radio transmissions. However, the technical problems of realising a seaborne high-frequency direction finding system were severe in comparison to those of a land based system. This was mainly due to the very detrimental effect of radio signal reflections from the ship's superstructure, which could cause severe errors in the required measurement of U-boat bearings.

The key to an operational system was the design of an effective seaborne direction finding antenna, which was an extremely difficult task.

==== Struszynski's solution ====
On his arrival in England, Struszynski joined the staff of HM Signal School (later called the Admiralty Signal Establishment), and in a very short time, he not only proposed a solution to the problem of signal reflection, but also introduced 'sense' into the antenna, to distinguish between radio signals arriving from the correct direction to those offset by 180 degrees. He also led a team at HM Signal School that developed a practical antenna, which enabled effective high frequency direction finding systems to be installed on Royal Navy convoy escort ships.

A comprehensive account of the work on HF/DF at HM Signal School is given by Redgment, who worked with Struszynski during and after the war, and details of the antenna are described by Struszynski et al., and by Bauer.

==== Importance of seaborne HF/DF ====
The Germans considered that the technical problems of seaborne radio direction finding could not be adequately solved, and U-boats continued to use their high frequency radios, revealing their bearings to convoy escorts. An escort ship could then steer in the direction of a U-boat, forcing it to be defensive, and possibly destroying it. Alternatively, Allied aircraft could be advised of the bearings.

In his authoritative book 'Hitler's U-Boat War: The Hunted, 1942–1945', the American naval historian Clay Blair Jr. refers to Struszynski's achievement of antenna design as "a breakthrough of transcendent importance." He also states that "The popular rush to credit radar, and later codebreaking, for the defeat of the U-boat left the equally effective but less glamorous and more difficult to understand Huff-Duff in the shadows".

Enigma historian Ralph Erskine ('Military Communications: from ancient times to the 21st Century') states, "An operational research report based on Ultra estimated that without shipborne high frequency direction finding, Allied convoy losses in early 1943 would have been 25 to 50 percent higher, with U-boat kills being reduced by one-third." This was the time of the essential defeat of the U-boat in the North Atlantic.

Also, the German naval historian Jürgen Rohwer ('The Critical Convoy Battles of March 1943') concludes, after examination of official British and German records, and many lengthy discussions with the wartime Commander of U-boats, Karl Dönitz, "If we analyse the great convoy battles between June 1942 and May 1943—including both those operations which the Germans regarded as successful and those which ended as either minor successes or failures—the remarkable fact is that the outcome always depended decisively on the efficient use of high frequency direction finding".

Rohwer also notes that, during the war, the Germans, being unaware of seaborne high frequency direction finding, concluded that their U-boat failures were due to Allied radar developments. Thus German records stress the relevance of radar, and not of seaborne HF/DF. Both radar and HF/DF (and ASDIC) were vital electronic techniques in the defeat of the U-boats, but HF/DF had the advantage of being able to determine the bearing of a U-boat at a range far greater than seaborne radar could achieve.

=== Later career ===
Struszynski subsequently worked at the Marconi Research Laboratories, later renamed the Marconi Research Centre, Great Baddow, England, where he was a consultant in communications research until his retirement.

== See also ==
- Anti-submarine warfare
- List of World War II British naval radar
- List of World War II electronic warfare equipment
- Radar in World War II
- Radio direction finder
- Signals intelligence
