= Operation Most III =

WW2 Anglo-Polish intelligence operation

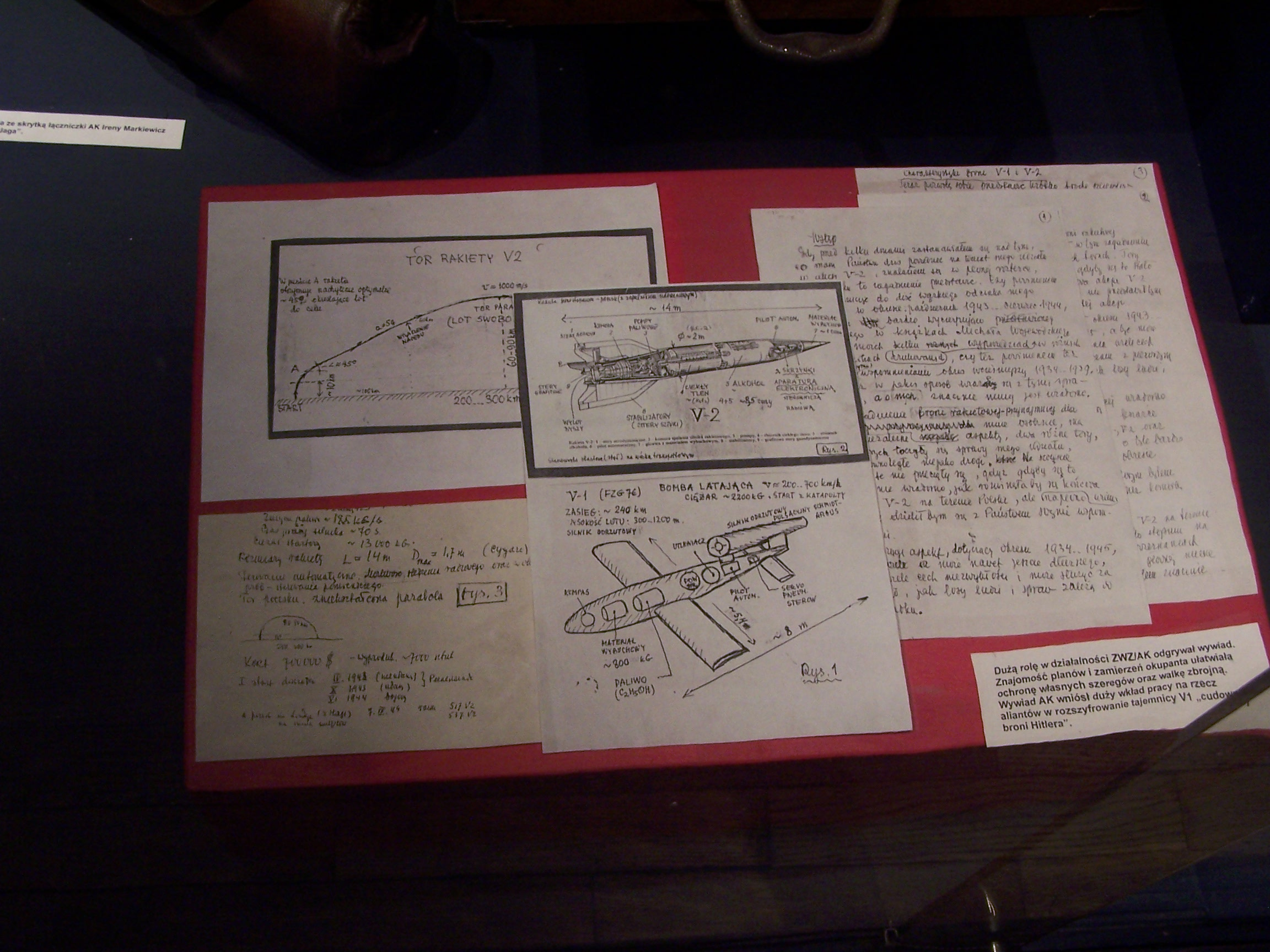
Home Army intelligence report with V1 and V2 schematic drawings.

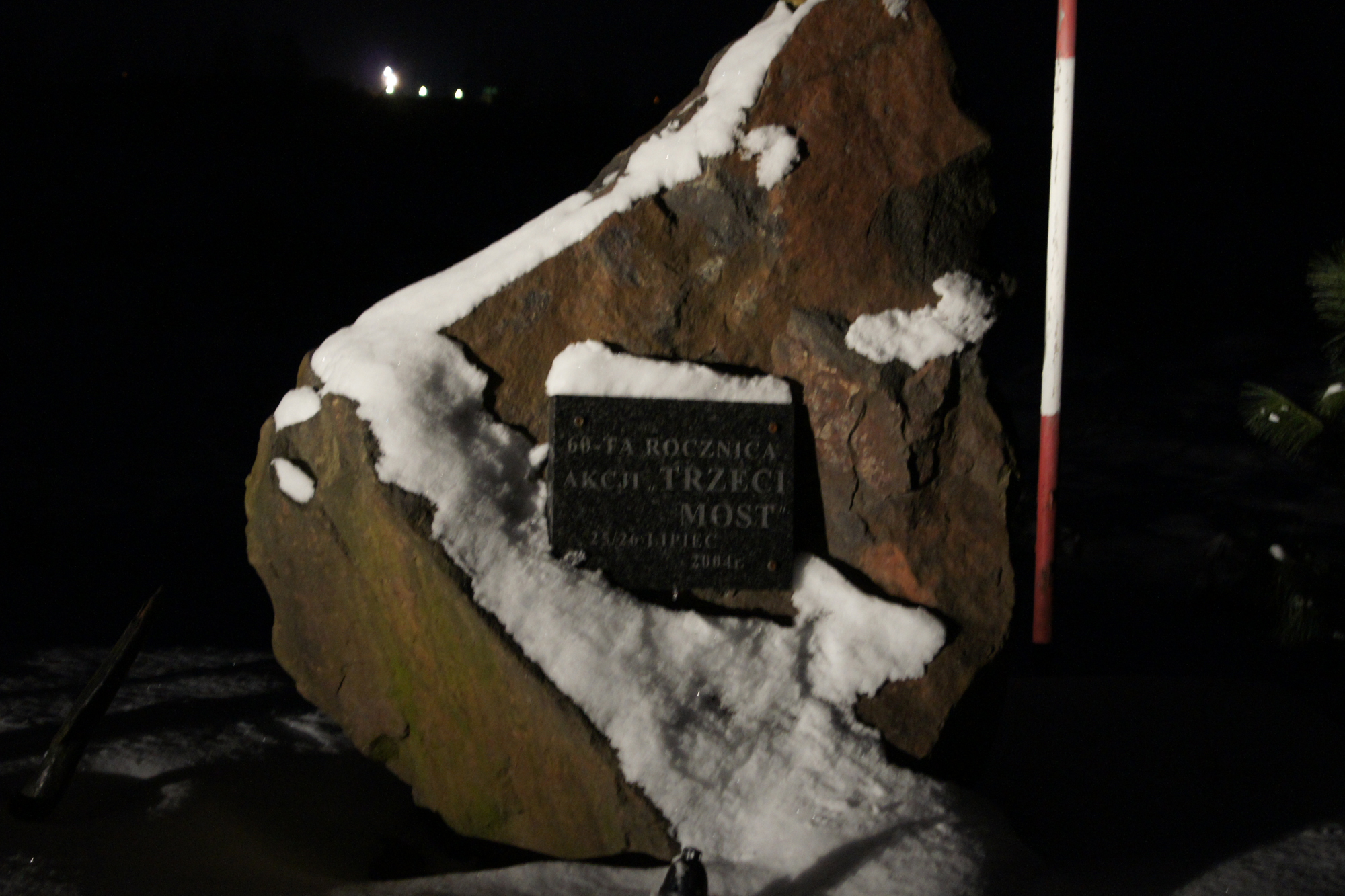
Memorial at the Motyl landing site

Operation Most III (Polish for Bridge III) or Operation Wildhorn III (in British documents) was a World War II operation in which Poland's Armia Krajowa provided the Allies with crucial intelligence on the German V-2 rocket.

== Background ==
From November 1943 onwards, the Intelligence Division of the Polish Home Army (Armia Krajowa) obtained parts of the V-2 rocket, which was being tested at a missile launch site near Blizna, central Poland. The availability of parts increased from April 1944, when numerous test rockets fell near Sarnaki village, in the vicinity of the Bug River, south of Siemiatycze. On the night of 20 May 1944 a particularly intact rocket fell into the swampy banks of the Bug. Parts of the rocket were secured by the Armia Krajowa, and analyzed at its secret laboratories in Warsaw. The analysis was performed by Professor Janusz Groszkowski (radio and guidance), Marceli Struszyński (fuel), Bogdan Stefanowski (engine), Antoni Kocjan, and others.

== Operation ==
On the night of July 25, 1944, just past 10:00 p.m., a Royal Air Force (RAF) Dakota KG477 transport plane of No. 267 Squadron lifted off from Brindisi in southern Italy bound for an abandoned airfield in Poland near the village of Wał-Ruda. This airfield was code-named Motyl. The transport plane, which had been fitted with additional fuel tanks for a flight endurance of up to 18 hours, was piloted by a New Zealander, Flight Lieutenant Stanley G. Culliford, and co-piloted by a Polish native, Flight Lieutenant Kazimierz Szrajer. The plan was to land the plane in territory surrounded with German military units retreating westward under pressure by the Soviet army and obtain the V-2 missile components. At just past midnight, the Dakota circled above the landing location and the partisans (who had been previously informed through encrypted codes over BBC radio) recognized the transport plane. Upon the plane's landing, the partisans emerged from the woods nearby pulling carts with key V-2 components. Once the cargo was loaded, the pilots attempted to take off, but the wheels of the plane were lodged in the muddy ground.

Hastily, the mud was shovelled away and another attempt was made to take off, but the wheels of the plane had sunk even deeper in the mud. Attempts to lodge sticks under the wheels were unsuccessful. Some partisans began digging around the wheels with their bare hands while others found wooden slats in the nearby woods that were subsequently wedged underneath the wheels. Finally the plane pulled out of the mud and was able to take off with the V-2 components before detection by German military units.

Two days later the Dakota arrived in London. British scientists began devising a way to interfere with the guidance of the V-2 missile using radio waves, but it was discovered that the V-2 mechanism was not designed to "react to countermeasures by radio."

== Participants ==
On the outgoing flight from Brindisi the aircraft had 4 passengers: Kazimierz Bilski, Jan Nowak-Jeziorański, Leszek Starzyński and Bogusław Wolniak.

On the return flight, Jerzy Chmielewski, Józef Retinger, Tomasz Arciszewski, Tadeusz Chciuk, and Czesław Miciński were ferried from occupied Poland to Brindisi, Italy. It was intended that Antoni Kocjan (who had personally studied parts of V-2 missiles) would take part, but he was arrested by the Gestapo and therefore was replaced by Jerzy Chmielewski.

The aircraft's crew included: F/Lt S.G. (George) Culliford (Captain), F/O Kazimierz Szrajer (Co-pilot and translator) (Polish), F/O J.P. Williams (Navigator), F/Sgt J. Appleby (Radio-operator).

== Media appearance ==
Dramatisation of the events was published in the book They Saved London written by Bernard Newman in 1955. The book was later turned into a feature film Battle of the V-1.

The operation was featured in the 1977 BBC TV series The Secret War, episode 3, "Terror Weapons", which included Janusz Groszkowski's memories of the operation.

Operation Most III was one of the major plot elements in Frozen Flashes ("Gefrorene Blitze"), a GDR movie about the development of the V2 and the history of the resistance movement in Peenemünde during the Second World War and its attempt to sabotage the V-2 programme.

== See also ==
- Battle of the V-1
- Home Army and V1 and V2
- Polish contribution to World War II
