= Marceli Struszyński =

Polish chemist (1880–1959)

Marceli Struszyński (born January 16, 1880, in Winnica – September 1, 1959, in Warsaw) was a Polish chemist and Professor of Warsaw University of Technology from 1938 to 1939 and 1945–1959.

His research was in analytical chemistry and he published several textbooks on the topic. Additionally, he developed an original classification of anions.

During the Second World War he worked with Polish resistance. He analyzed fuel for V-2 rockets during Operation Most III.

He was the father of Wacław Struszyński. Waclaw escaped to England in the war, and made exceptional technical contributions to high frequency (HF) radio direction finding at sea which enabled Royal Navy convoy escort vessels to achieve rapid location of U-boats when they made HF radio transmissions.

== Works ==
- Analiza techniczna (1946)
- Analiza ilościowa i techniczna (t. 1–3 1947–50)
- Jakościowa analiza organiczna (1960)
- Jakościowa analiza nieorganiczna (1960)
