= Opole Voivodeship =

Voivodeship in Poland

Opole Voivodeship Województwo opolskie
- Voivodeship
- Flag Coat of arms Brandmark

- Location within Poland

- Administrative divisions
- Coordinates (Opole): 50°40′N 17°56′E
- Country: Poland
- Capital: Opole
- Counties: 1 city, 11 land counties, further divided into 71 gminas: Opole; Brzeg County; Głubczyce County; Kędzierzyn-Koźle County; Kluczbork County; Krapkowice County; Namysłów County; Nysa County; Olesno County; Opole County; Prudnik County; Strzelce County

Government
  - Body: Opole Voivodeship executive board
  - Voivode: Monika Jurek (PO)
  - Marshal: Szymon Ogłaza (PO)
  - EP: Lower Silesian and Opole

Area
  - Total: 9,412.5 km^{2} (3,634.2 sq mi)

Population (2019-06-30)
  - Total: 984,345
  - Density: 104.58/km^{2} (270.86/sq mi)
  - Urban: 524,473
  - Rural: 459,872

GDP
  - Total: €16.562 billion (2024)
  - Per capita: €18,735 (2023)

Languages
  - Languages: Polish (official); German (co-official in 28 communes)
- ISO 3166 code: PL-16
- Vehicle registration: O
- HDI (2019): 0.870 very high · 10th
- Website: http://www.opolskie.pl/

Opole Voivodeship (Polish: województwo opolskie [vɔjɛˈvut͡stfɔ ɔˈpɔlskʲɛ], Silesian: wojewodstwo Ôpole) is the smallest and least populated voivodeship (province) of Poland. The province's name derives from that of the region's capital and largest city, Opole. It is part of Silesia. A relatively large German minority lives in the voivodeship, and the German language is co-official in 28 communes.

Opole Voivodeship is bordered by Lower Silesian Voivodeship to the west, Greater Poland and Łódź Voivodeships to the north, Silesian Voivodeship to the east, and the Czech Republic (Olomouc Region and Moravian-Silesian Region) to the south.

Opole Province's geographic location, economic potential, and its population's level of education make it an attractive business partner for other Polish regions (especially Lower Silesian and Silesian Voivodeships) and for foreign investors. Formed in 1997, the Praděd/Pradziad Euroregion with its headquarter in Prudnik has facilitated economic, cultural and tourist exchanges between the border areas of Poland and the Czech Republic.

== History ==
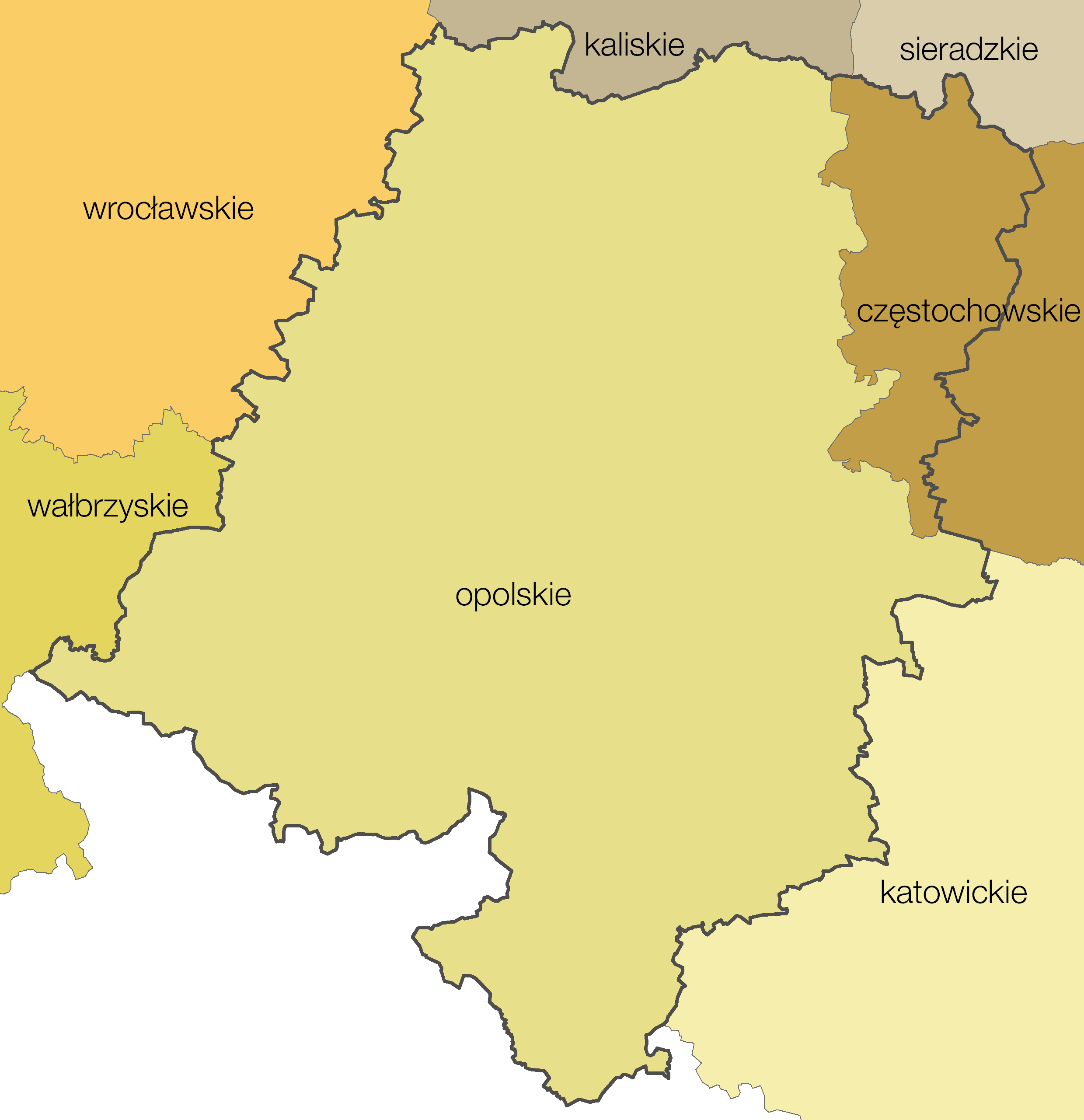
Voivodeships between 1975 and 1998 superimposed over the current borders of the Opole Voivodeship

The territory became part of the emerging Polish state in the 10th century, and later on, Brzeg, Namysłów, Niemodlin, Opole, Prudnik and Strzelce Opolskie were ducal seats of local lines of the Piast dynasty.

Opole Voivodeship was created on January 1, 1999, out of the former Opole Voivodeship and parts of Częstochowa Voivodeship, pursuant to the Polish local government reforms adopted in 1998. Originally, the government, advised by prominent historians, had wanted to disestablish Opolskie and partition its territory between the Lower Silesian and Silesian Voivodeship (eastern Upper Silesia and western Lesser Poland). The plan was that Brzeg and Namysłów, as the Western part of the region, were to be transferred to Lower Silesia, while the rest was to become, along with a part of the Częstochowa Voivodeship, an integral part of the new 'Silesian' region. However, the plans resulted in an outcry from the German minority population of Opole Voivodeship, who feared that should their region be abolished, they would lose all hope of regional representation (in the proposed Silesian Region, they would have formed a very small minority among a great number of ethnic Poles). To the surprise of many of the ethnic Germans in Opole however, the local Polish Silesian population and groups of ethnic Poles also rose up to oppose the planned reforms; this came about as a result of an overwhelming feeling of attachment to the voivodeships that were scheduled to be 'redrawn', as well as a fear of 'alienation' should one find themselves residing in a new, unfamiliar region.

The solution came in late 1999, when Olesno was, after 24 years apart, finally reunited with the Opole Voivodeship to form the new legally defined region. A historic moment came in 2006 when the town of Radłów changed its local laws to make German, alongside Polish, the district's second official language, becoming the first town in the region to do so.

== Geography ==
The voivodeship lies in southwestern Poland, the major part on the Silesian Lowland (Nizina Śląska). To the east, the region touches upon the Silesian Upland (Silesian Uplands, Wyżyna Śląska) with the famous Saint Anne Mountain; the Sudetes range, the Opawskie Mountains, lies to the southwest. The Oder River cuts across the middle of the voivodeship. The northern part of the voivodeship, along the Mała Panew River, is densely forested, while the southern part consists of arable land.

The region has the warmest climate in the country.

=== Protected areas ===
Protected areas in Opole Voivodeship include the following three areas designated as Landscape Parks:

- Opawskie Mountains Landscape Park
- Góra Świętej Anny Landscape Park
- Stobrawa Landscape Park

=== Climate ===
Climate data for Opole
Month	Jan	Feb	Mar	Apr	May	Jun	Jul	Aug	Sep	Oct	Nov	Dec	Year
Mean daily maximum °C (°F)	2 (36)	3 (37)	8 (46)	15 (59)	20 (68)	22 (72)	25 (77)	25 (77)	20 (68)	15 (59)	8 (46)	3 (37)	13.8 (56.8)
Mean daily minimum °C (°F)	−3 (27)	−3 (27)	0 (32)	4 (39)	8 (46)	11 (52)	14 (57)	14 (57)	10 (50)	5 (41)	1 (34)	−2 (28)	4.9 (40.8)
Source: MeteoBlue

== Administrative divisions ==
Opole Voivodeship is divided into 12 counties (powiats): 1 city county and 11 land counties. These are further divided into 71 gminas.

The counties are listed in the following table (ordering is by decreasing population).

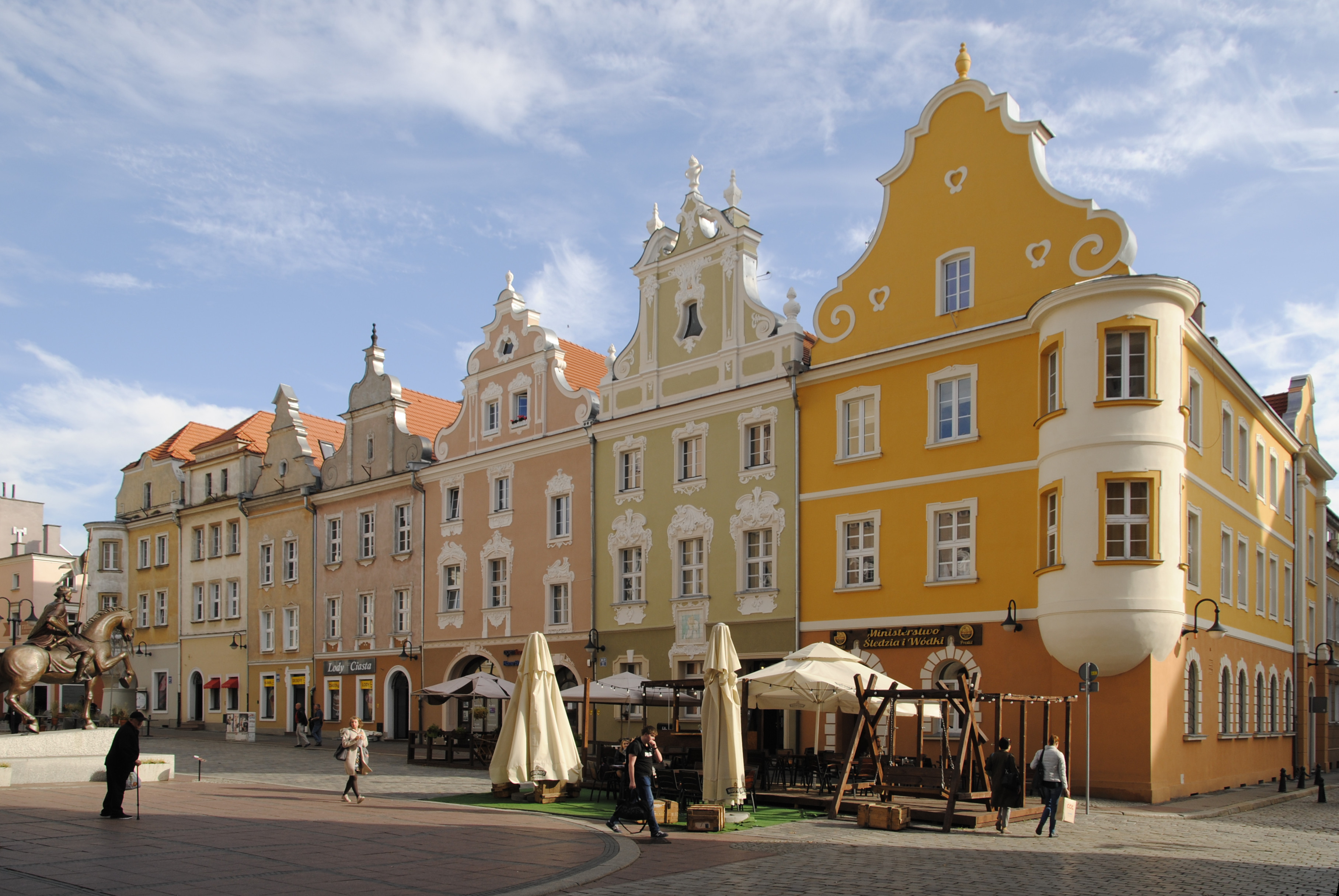
Opole, the voivodeship's capital

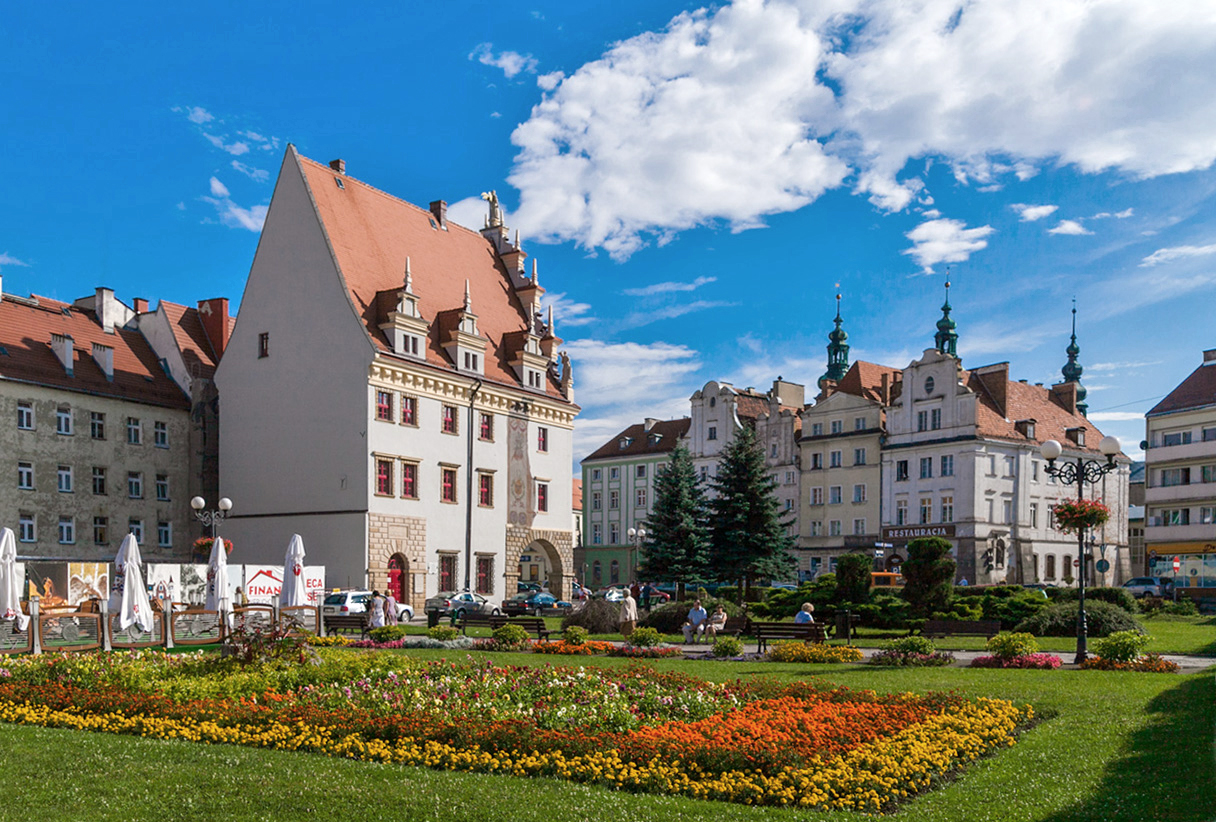
Nysa, the third-largest town by population in the south-west

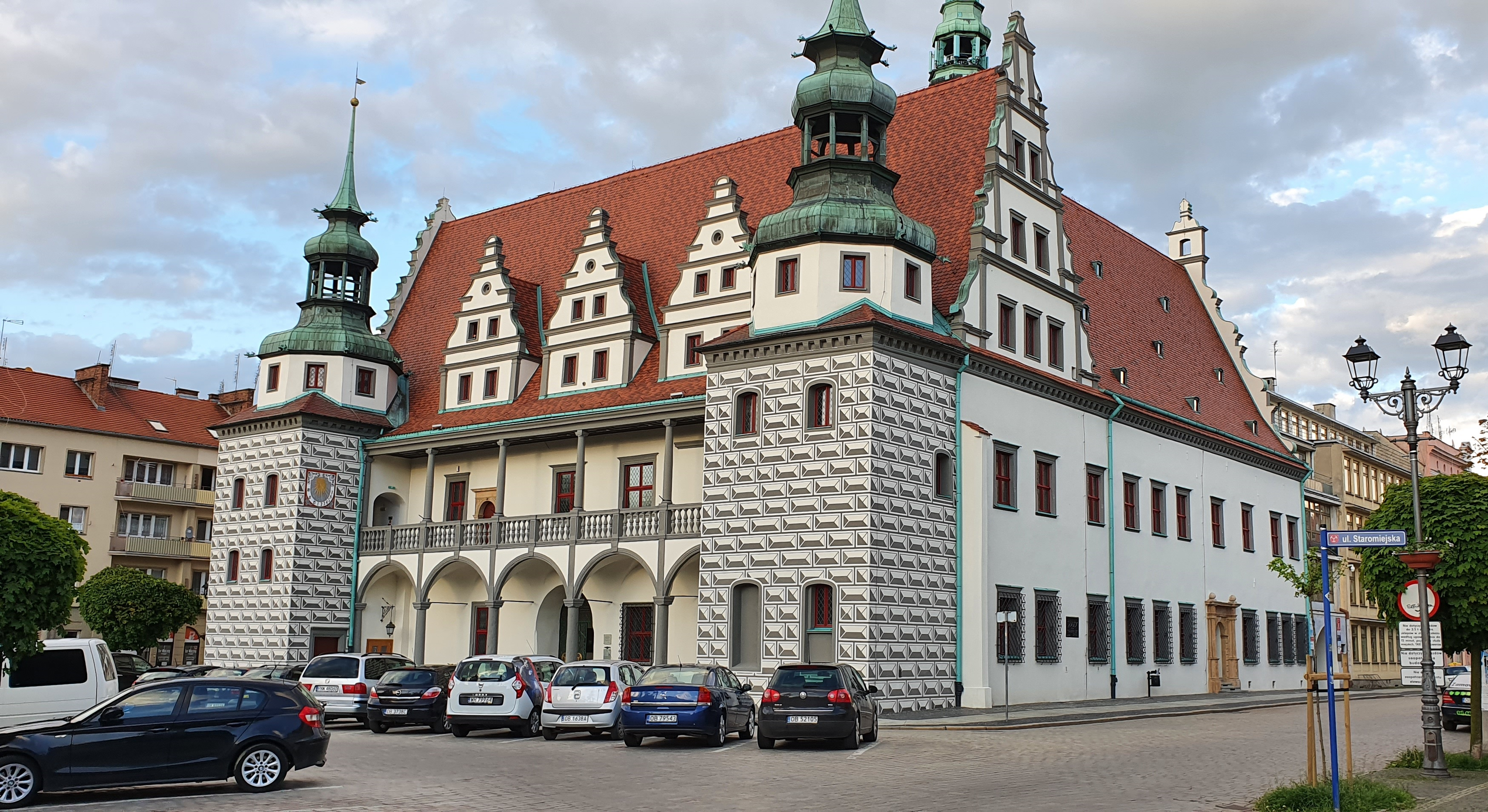
Brzeg, a popular tourist attraction for its Renaissance Town Hall and Castle

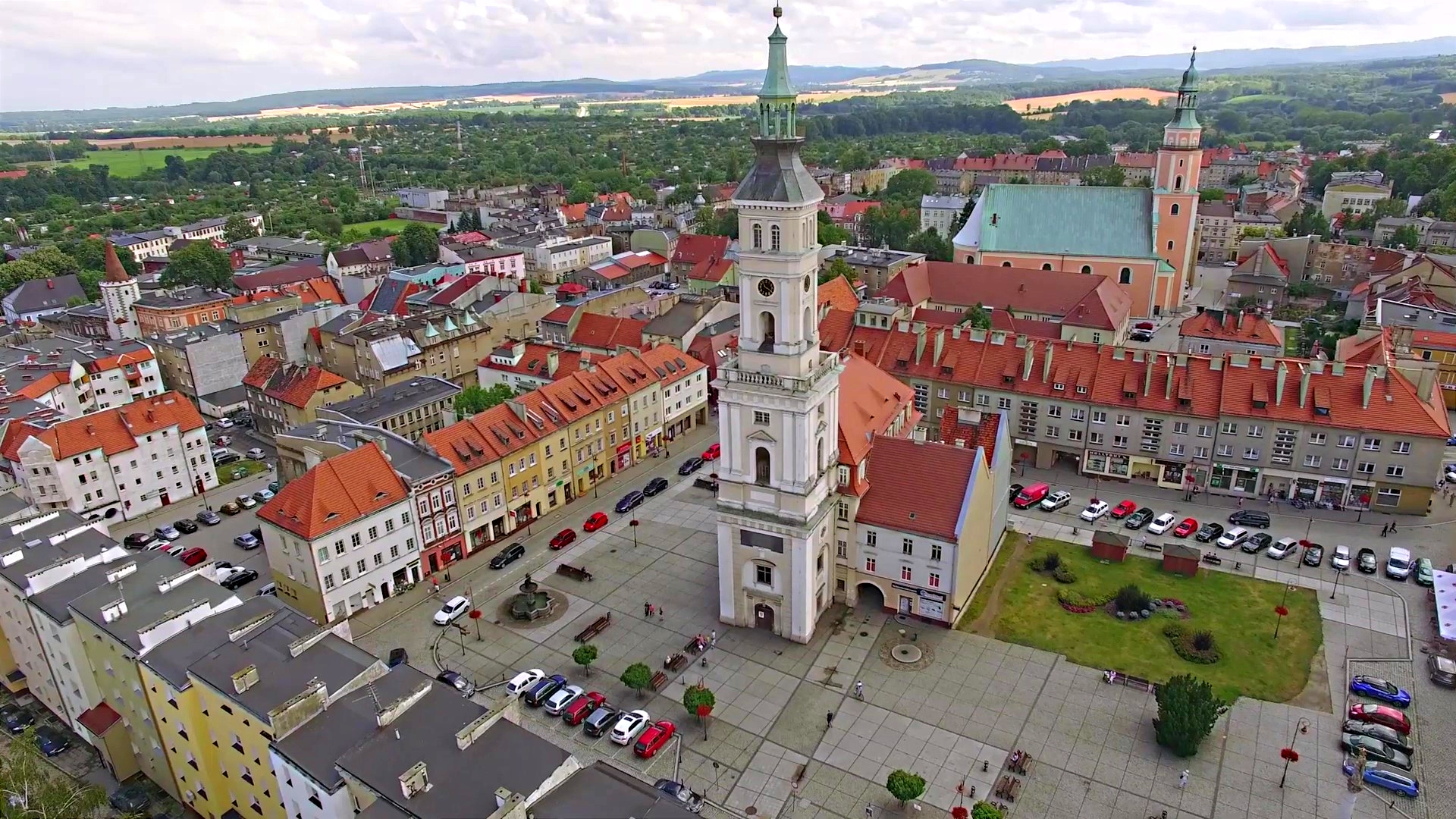
Prudnik, with its preserved medieval town centre

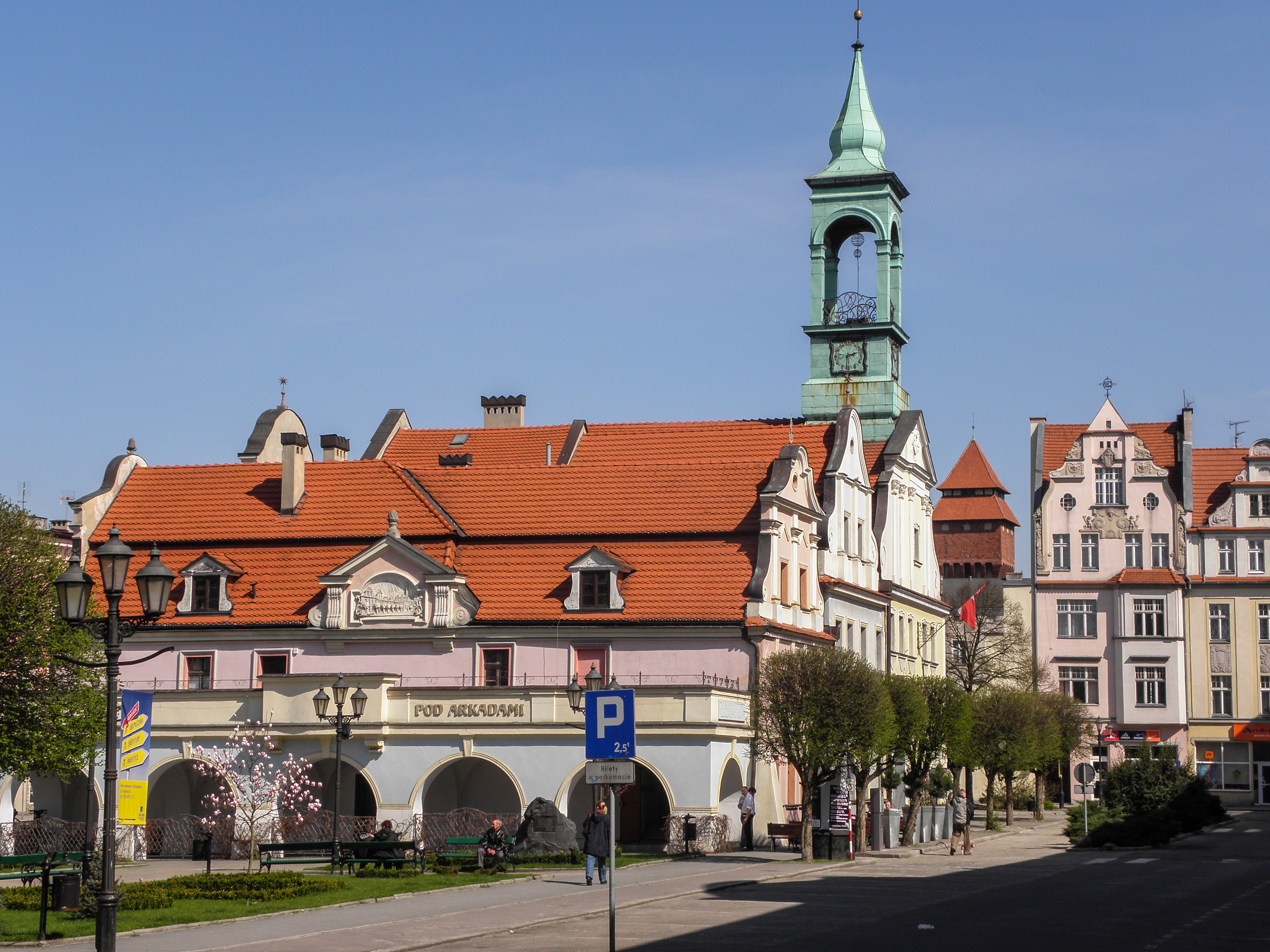
Kluczbork serves as a key rail line junction in the north-east of the region

English and Polish names	Area (km^{2})	Population (2019)	Seat	Other towns	Total gminas
City counties
Opole	96	128,208			1
Land counties
Nysa County powiat nyski	1,224	136,393	Nysa	Głuchołazy, Paczków, Otmuchów, Korfantów	9
Opole County powiat opolski	1,587	123,487	Opole*	Ozimek, Niemodlin, Prószków	13
Kędzierzyn-Koźle County powiat kędzierzyńsko-kozielski	625	94,135	Kędzierzyn-Koźle		6
Brzeg County powiat brzeski	877	90,054	Brzeg	Grodków, Lewin Brzeski	6
Strzelce County powiat strzelecki	744	74,460	Strzelce Opolskie	Zawadzkie, Kolonowskie, Leśnica, Ujazd	7
Kluczbork County powiat kluczborski	852	65,644	Kluczbork	Wołczyn, Byczyna	4
Olesno County powiat oleski	974	64,411	Olesno	Praszka, Dobrodzień, Gorzów Śląski	7
Krapkowice County powiat krapkowicki	442	63,857	Krapkowice	Zdzieszowice, Gogolin, Strzeleczki	5
Prudnik County powiat prudnicki	571	55,325	Prudnik	Głogówek, Biała	4
Głubczyce County powiat głubczycki	673	45,679	Głubczyce	Kietrz, Baborów, Branice	4
Namysłów County powiat namysłowski	748	42,692	Namysłów		5
* seat not part of the county

== Cities and towns ==
The voivodeship contains 2 cities and 34 towns. These are listed below in descending order of population (as of 2019):

Cities (governed by a city mayor or prezydent miasta):
1. Opole (128,208)
2. Kędzierzyn-Koźle (60,852)

Towns:

1. Nysa (43,489)
2. Brzeg (35,890)
3. Kluczbork (23,554)
4. Prudnik (21,041)
5. Strzelce Opolskie (17,900)
6. Namysłów (16,551)
7. Krapkowice (16,301)
8. Głuchołazy (13,534)
9. Głubczyce (12,552)
10. Zdzieszowice (11,445)
11. Olesno (9,374)
12. Ozimek (8,657)
13. Grodków (8,595)
14. Praszka (7,655)
15. Paczków (7,460)
16. Zawadzkie (7,135)
17. Gogolin (6,682)
18. Otmuchów (6,581)
19. Niemodlin (6,315)
20. Kietrz (6,005)
21. Wołczyn (5,907)
22. Lewin Brzeski (5,736)
23. Głogówek (5,592)
24. Tułowice (4,011)
25. Dobrodzień (3,720)
26. Byczyna (3,582)
27. Kolonowskie (3,309)
28. Baborów (2,905)
29. Prószków (2,570)
30. Leśnica (2,556)
31. Gorzów Śląski (2,452)
32. Biała (2,426)
33. Korfantów (1,808)
34. Ujazd (1,763)
35. Branice

== Demographics ==
Historical population
Year	Pop.	±%
1988	1,080,701	—
2002	1,065,043	−1.4%
2011	1,016,212	−4.6%
2021	954,133	−6.1%

The Opole Voivodeship is the smallest region in the administrative makeup of the country in terms of both area and population.

About 15% of the one million inhabitants of this voivodeship are ethnic Germans, which constitutes 90% of all ethnic Germans in Poland. Towns with particularly high concentrations of German speakers include: Strzelce Opolskie; Dobrodzien; Prudnik; Głogówek; and Gogolin. As a result, many areas are officially bilingual and the German language and culture play a significant role in education in the region. Ethnic Germans first came to this region during the Late Middle Ages. The area was once part of the Prussian province of Silesia.

== Economy ==
The Gross domestic product (GDP) of the province was 10.1 billion euros in 2018, accounting for 2.0% of Polish economic output. GDP per capita adjusted for purchasing power was 17,000 euros or 56% of the EU27 average in the same year. The GDP per employee was 66% of the EU average.

The Opole Voivodeship is an industrial as well as an agricultural region. With respect to mineral resources, of major importance are deposits of raw materials for building: limestone (Strzelce Opolskie), marl (near Opole), marble, and basalt. The favourable climate, fertile soils, and high farming culture contribute to the development of agriculture, which is among the most productive in the country.

A total of nineteen industries are represented in the voivodeship. The most important are cement and lime, furniture, food, car manufacturing, and chemical industries. In 1997, the biggest production growth in the area was in companies producing wood and wood products, electrical equipment, machinery and appliances, as well as cellulose and paper products. In 1997, the top company in the region was Zakłady Azotowe S.A. in Kędzierzyn-Koźle, whose income was over PLN 860 million. The voivodship's economy consists of more than 53,000 businesses, mostly small and medium-sized, employing over 332,000 people. Manufacturing companies employ over 89,000 people; 95.7% of all the region's business operate in the private sector.

=== Tourism ===
The Opole Voivodeship is a green region with three large lakes: Turawskie, Nyskie, and Otmuchów (the latter two are connected). The Opawskie Mountains between Prudnik and Głuchołazy are extremely popular. The region also includes the castle in Brzeg, built during the reign of the Piast dynasty—pearl of the Silesian Renaissance, the Franciscan monastery on top of Góra Świętej Anny (Saint Anne Mountain), as well as the medieval old town and defence fortifications in Paczków (referred to as the Polish Carcassonne), all designated Historic Monument of Poland. Kamień Śląski with its Baroque palace hosts a sanctuary dedicated to Saint Hyacinth of Poland, who was born in the village. Other landmark palaces are located in Moszna, Narok, Żyrowa, castles in Namysłów, Niemodlin, Otmuchów, Prószków, and the preserved medieval Piast Tower in Opole.

There are several World War II memorials in the voivodeship, including at the site of the Blechhammer concentration camp and Stalag VIII-B prisoner-of-war camp, and at sites of German-perpetrated massacres. The village of Popielów hosts a small cemetery of the Commonwealth War Graves Commission, where two British soldiers are buried, who as prisoners-of-war were killed by a German guard during forced labour.

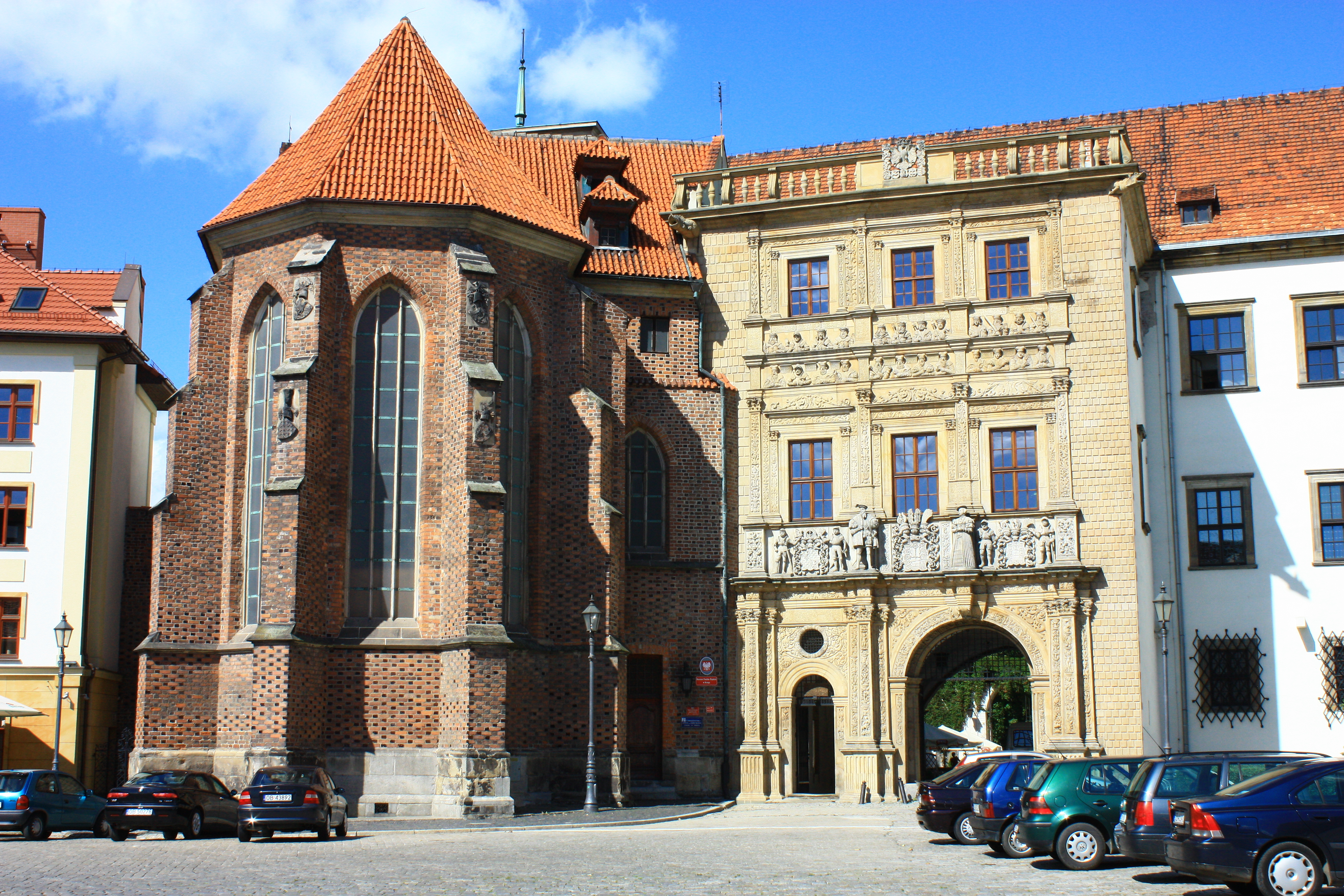
Brzeg Castle

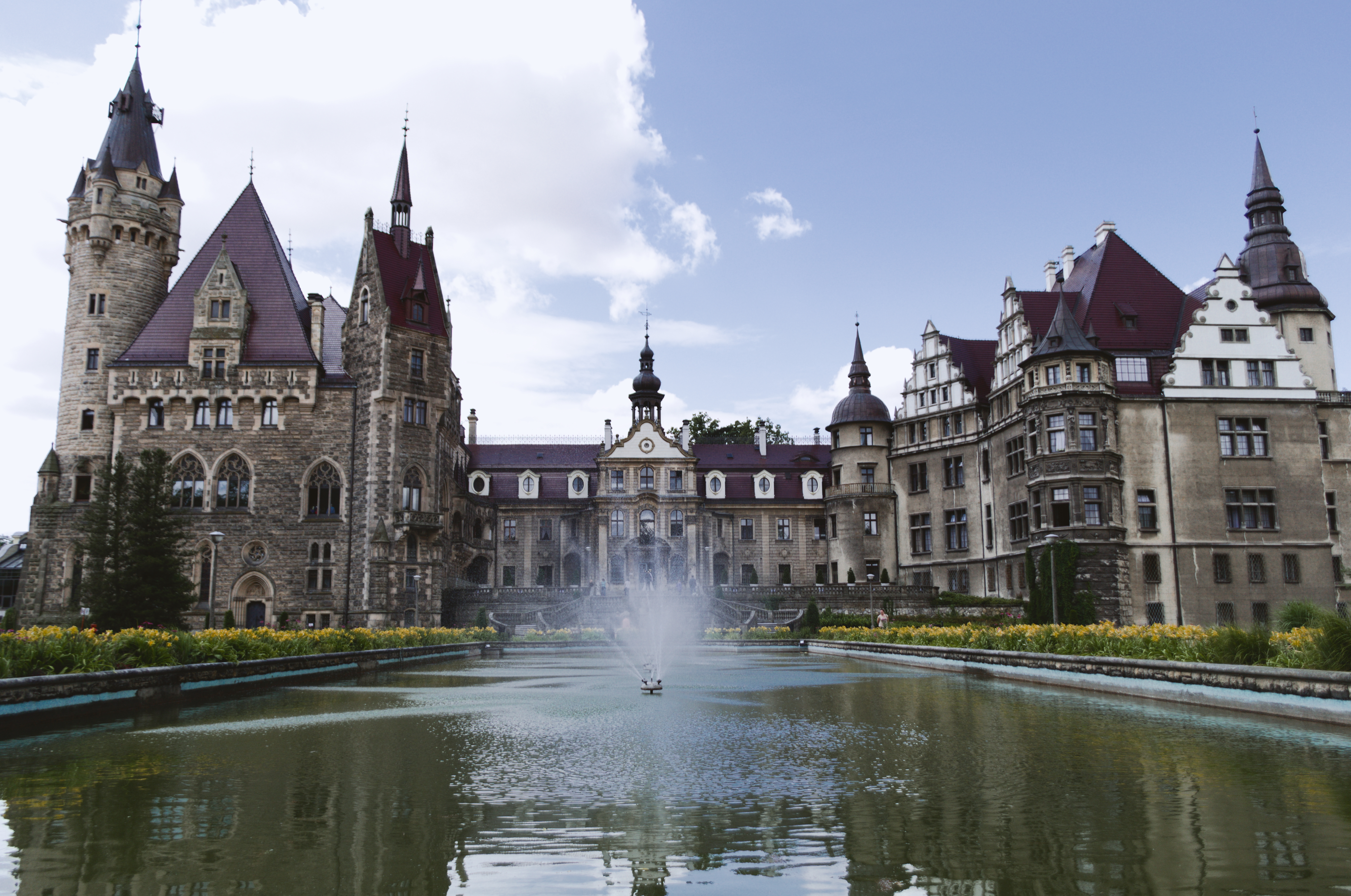
Moszna Castle

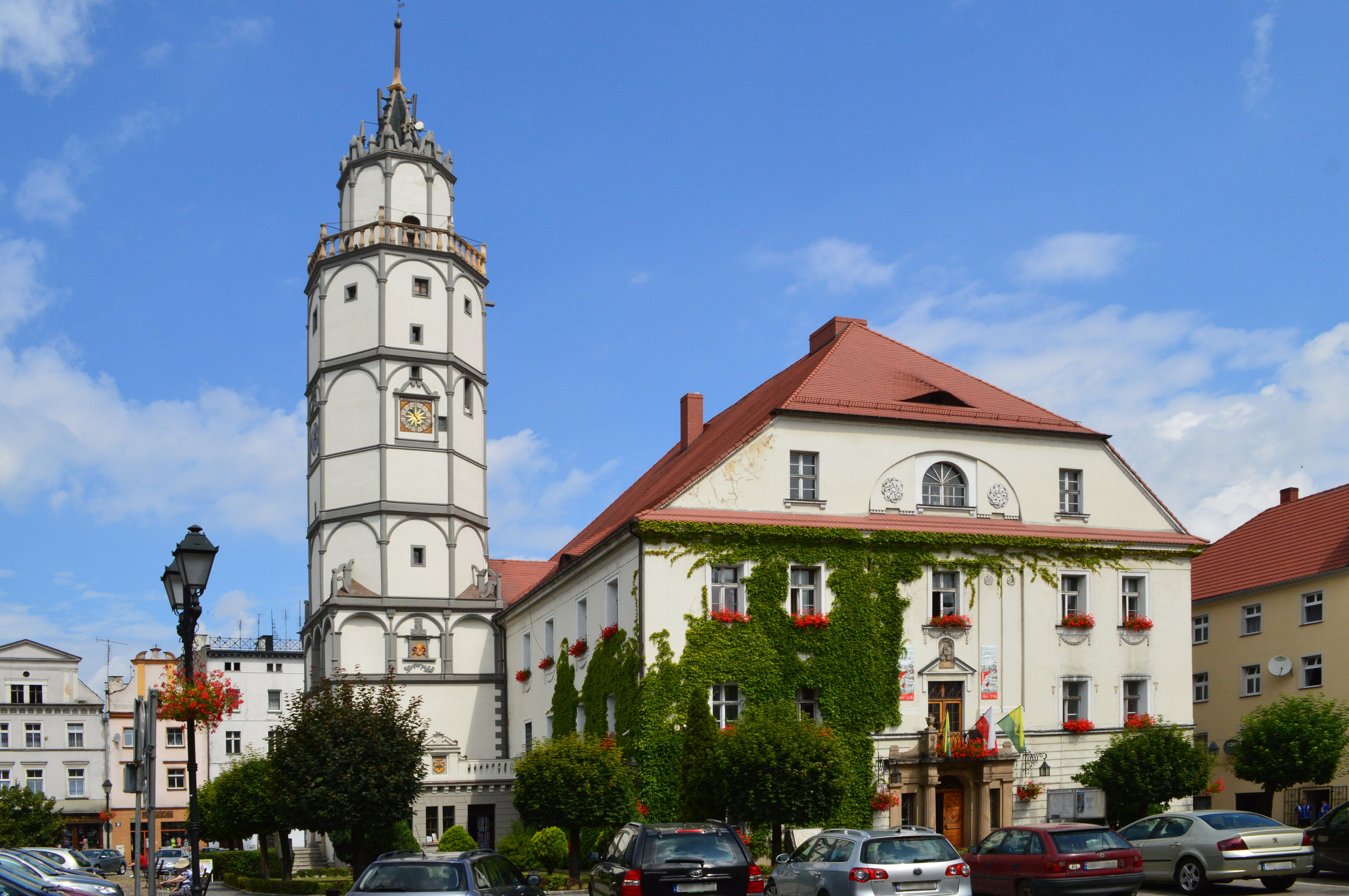
Paczków Old Town

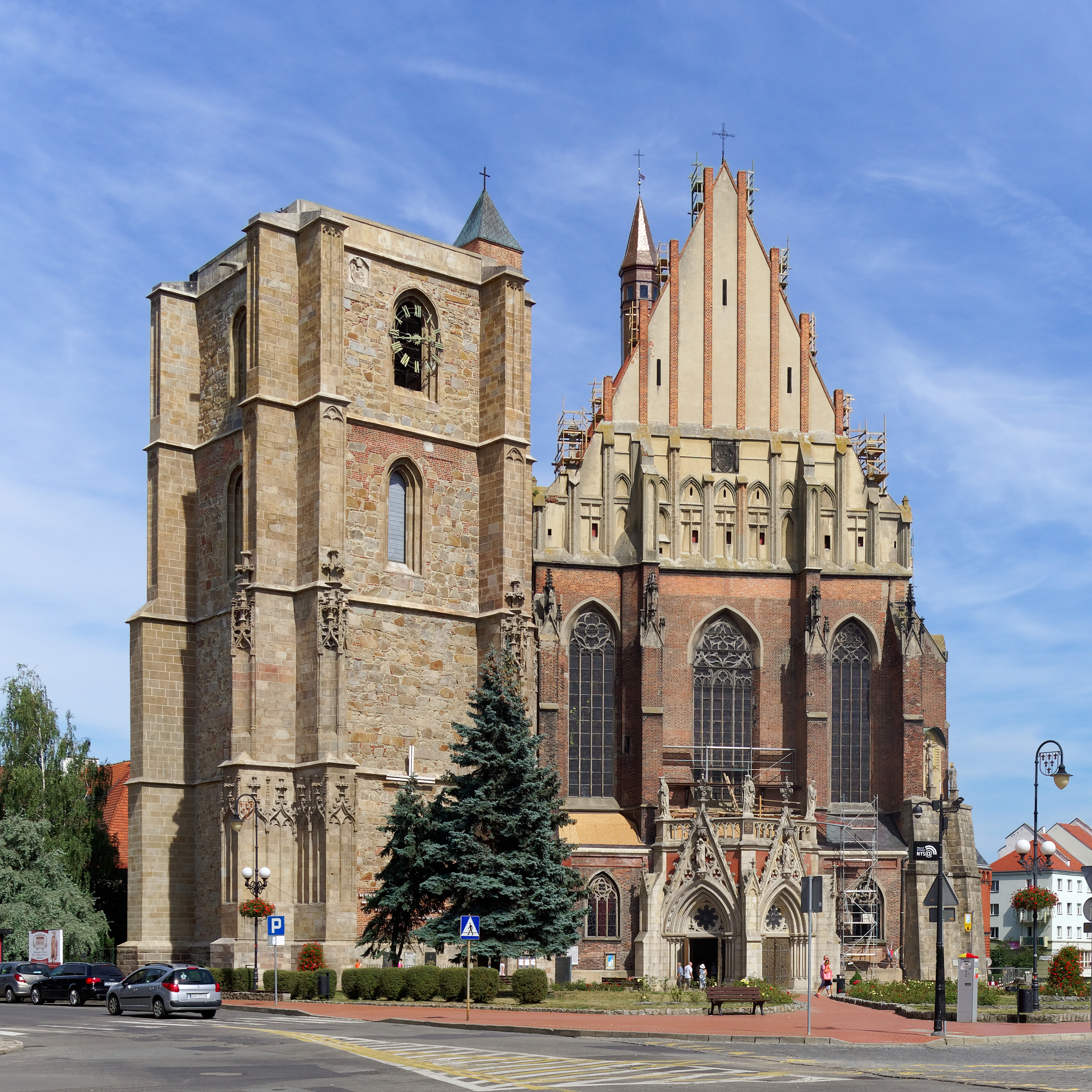
Basilica of St. James and St. Agnes, Nysa

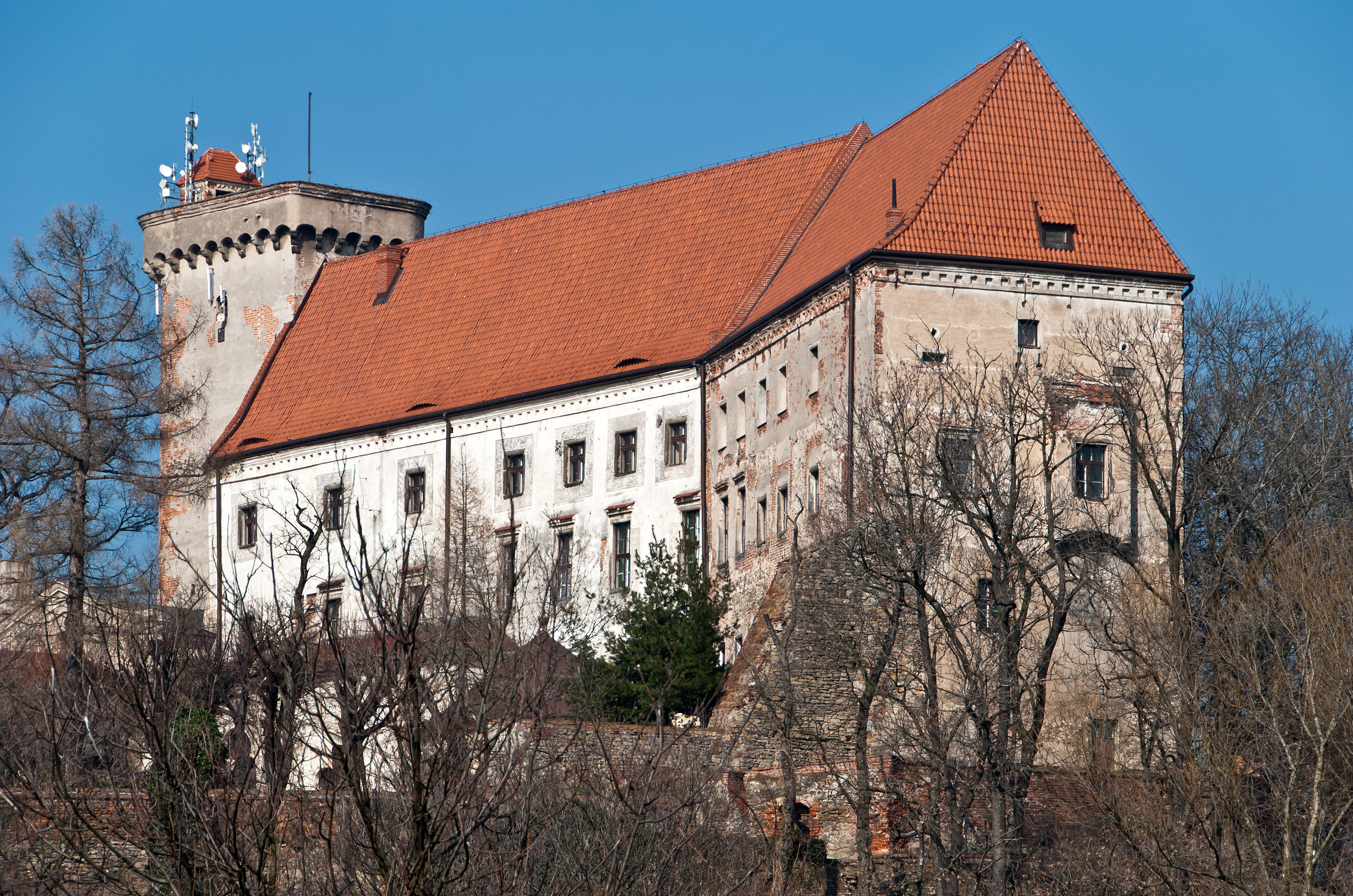
Medieval Otmuchów Castle

=== International tourism ===
According to the Central Statistical Office of Poland, Opole Voivodeship is most frequently visited by international tourists from countries located in Europe (94.6%). The rank was followed by tourists from Asia, compromising 2.4% of the total international tourist figure, followed by that of North America at 1.8%. The general composition of international tourists visiting the Opole Voivodeship remains unchanged, with 46.2% of tourists heading from Germany.

International tourists visiting Opole Voivodeship with an overnight stay according to country of permanent residence:

Overnight international tourists in Opole Voivodeship (2015)
Country	International tourists (change from 2010)
Austria	600(+33.3%)
Belgium	450(+6.6%)
Czech Republic	2,200(+41.9%)
Denmark	370(+2.7%)
France	1,400(+33.3%)
Germany	18,100(+8.5%)
Hungary	375(+7.1%)
Italy	910(+13.7%)
Netherlands	1,220(-43.4%)
Norway	450(+33.3%)
Romania	450(+44.4%)
Russia	320(-46.0%)
Slovakia	1,000(+40.0%)
Spain	520(+28.9%)
Sweden	320(-12.5%)
Ukraine	5,200(+26.9%)
United Kingdom	950(-24.2%)
United States of America	600(+25.0%)

In 2015, a total of c. 90,800 overnight stays were hosted for international tourists, a figure making up 12.4% of the total amount of overnight stays for Opole Voivodeship. The majority (44.7%) of international overnight stays were hosted in the city of Opole, followed by Kędzierzyn-Koźle County (9.9%) and Nysa County at (9.4%).

== Transportation ==
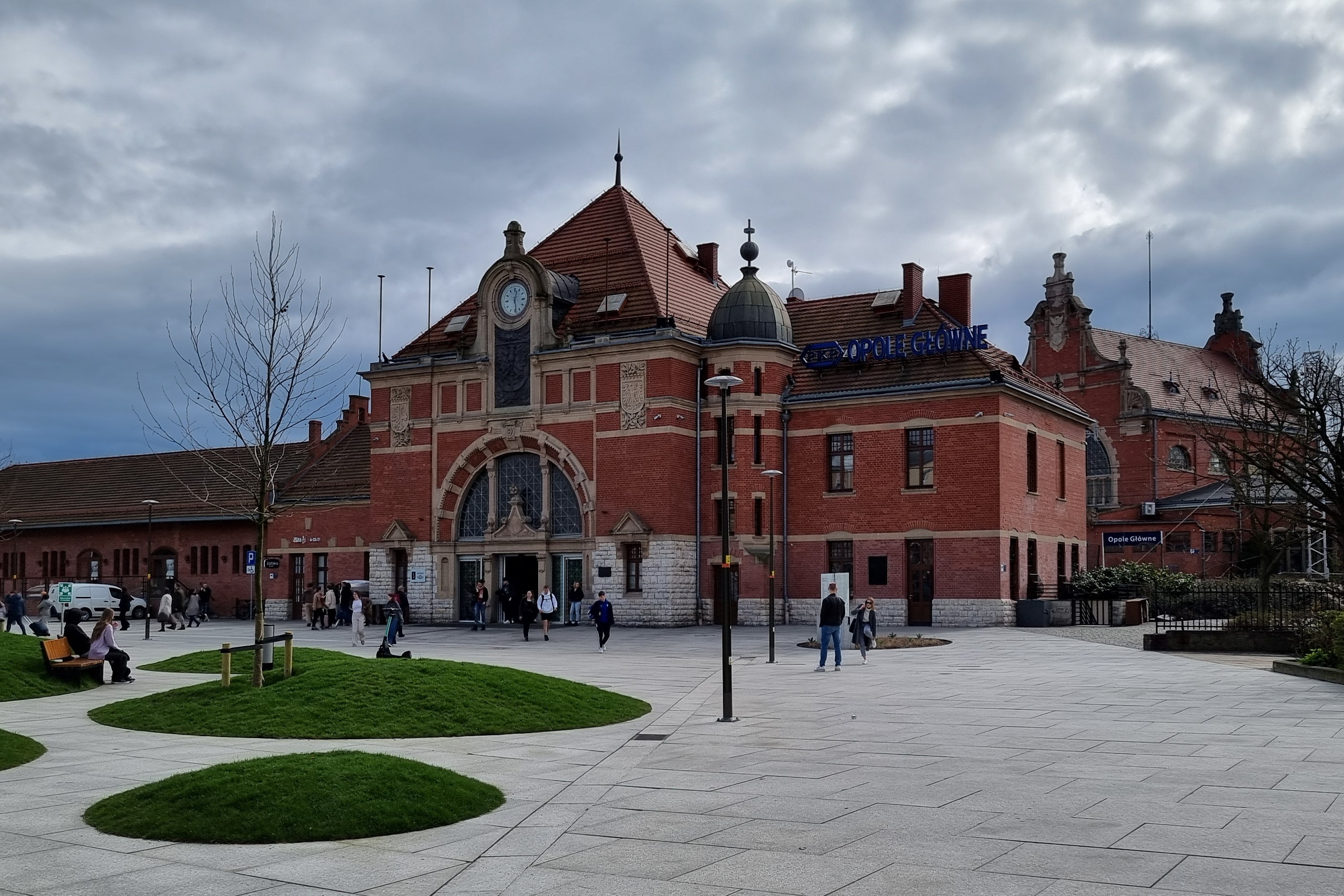
Opole Główne railway station is a major transportation hub through which much of the region's trade is channelled

The transport route from Germany to Ukraine, the A4, runs through Opole. The region has four border crossings, and direct rail connections to all important Polish cities, as well as to Frankfurt, Munich, Budapest, Kyiv, and the Baltic ports.

== Universities ==
There are three state-run universities in the region: the Opole University, the Opole University of Technology, and the Public Higher Medical Professional School in Opole. All of them are based in the voivodeship's capital. Among the region's private schools, the Opole School of Management and Administration has been certified as a degree-granting institution by the Ministry of National Education.

- Opole University of Technology
- Opole University
- State Medical College
- Opole School of Management and Administration
- Bogdan Jański College
- The State Higher Vocational School in Nysa, PWSZ in NYSA

== Surnames ==
Most popular surnames in Opole Voivodeship:

1. Nowak: 5,538
2. Wieczorek: 2,654
3. Mazur: 2,512

== Sports ==
Professional sports teams
Club	Sport	League	Trophies
ZAKSA Kędzierzyn-Koźle	Volleyball (men's)	PlusLiga	9 Polish Championships; 10 Polish Cups; 3 CEV Champions League (2021, 2022, 2023)
Stal Nysa	Volleyball (men's)	I liga	1 Polish Cup (1996)
UNI Opole	Volleyball (women's)	Polish Women's Volleyball League	0
Odra Opole	Football (men's)	I liga	0
Gwardia Opole	Handball (men's)	Polish Superliga	0
Kolejarz Opole	Speedway	Polish National Speedway League	0
AZS Politechnika Opolska	Basketball (men's)	1 Liga	0
Dreman Futsal Opole-Komprachcice	Futsal (men's)	Ekstraklasa	0

== Former Opole Voivodeships ==
=== Opole Voivodeship (1975–1999) ===
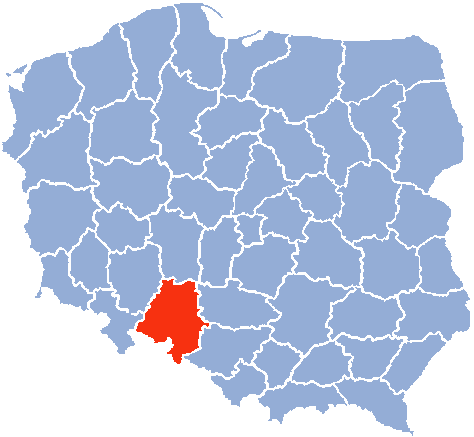
Opole Voivodeship 1975–1999.

Opole Voivodeship was also a unit of administrative division and local government in Poland between 1975 and 1998.

Major cities and towns (population in 1995):

- Opole, capital city (130,600)
- Kędzierzyn-Koźle (70,700)
- Nysa (49,000)
- Brzeg (39,900)
- Kluczbork (26,900)
- Prudnik (24,300)
- Strzelce Opolskie (21,900)
- Krapkowice (20,100)

=== Opole Voivodeship (1950–1975) ===
This administrative region of the People's Republic of Poland (1950–1975) was created as a result of the partition of Katowice Voivodeship in 1950.

== See also ==
- Opole cuisine
- Śląsk Opolski
- Upper Silesia
- Silesia
