= Oskar Wieczorek =

Polish chess grandmaster (born 1994)

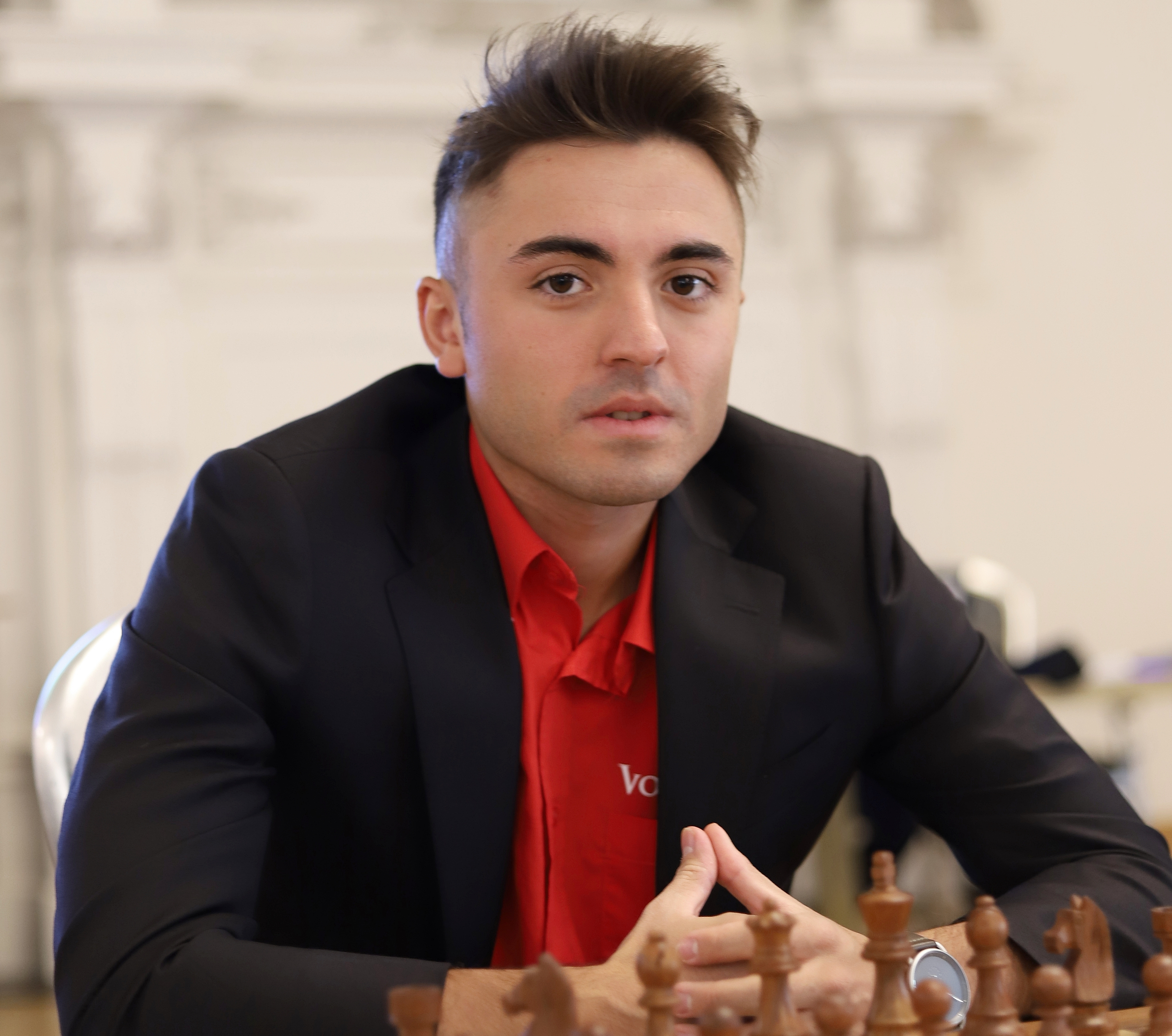
- Oskar Wieczorek in 2021

Personal information
- Born: 13 June 1994 (age 32) Wrocław, Poland

Chess career
- Country: Poland
- Title: Grandmaster (2019)
- FIDE rating: 2495 (July 2026)
- Peak rating: 2512 (May 2023)

Oskar Wieczorek (born 13 June 1994) is a Polish chess Grandmaster.

== Biography ==
Oskar Wieczorek took part in the finals of the Polish Youth Chess Championships, winning bronze medals twice: in the U10 age group (Kołobrzeg 2004) and in the U18 age group (Murzasichle 2011). He represented Poland at the World Youth Chess Championship (Czarna 2010 - U20 age group) and the European Youth Chess Championships (Herceg Novi 2008 - U14 age group, Batumi 2010 - U16 age group, Albena 2011 – U18 age group). Oskar Wieczorek won five medals Polish Youth Team Chess Championships: two gold (Ustroń 2011, Suchedniów 2012) and three silver (Gorzów Wielkopolski 2008, Chotowa 2009, Ustroń 2010) - all in the colors of the club Polonia (Wrocław). He competed in Polish Team Chess Championship many times, winning three bronze medals in 2013, 2016 and 2017 (also in the colors of Polonia Wrocław). In 2017, Oskar Wieczorek won the silver medal of the Polish Academic Chess Championships in Lublin, and in 2018 in Aracaju, in Brazil a silver team medal of the World Academic Chess Championships.

Oskar Wieczorek met the norms for the title of Grandmaster at Polish Team Chess Championship (2016), in Legnica (2018) and on the German 2. Chess Bundesliga in the southern section (2019).

In 2008, Oskar Wieczorek shared 2nd place (with, among others, Łukasz Cyborowski) in the open chess tournament in Rewal. In 2010, he took 2nd place in the Marienbad Open 2010 - B1 - IM tournament in Marianske Lazne and shared the second place in the V International Cup of the Main Board of AZS in Wrocław. In 2011, he took the 2nd place (ahead of, among others, Marek Vokáč) in the chess tournament Marienbad Open 2011 - A - GM in Mariańskie baths, and in 2012, in the next round-robin tournament in Marianske Lazne, he took 4th place (behind Grigoriy Oparin, Konstantin Chernyshov and Mohamed Haddouche). In 2013, he shared 2nd place (behind Łukasz Cyborowski, together with, among others, Mirosław Grabarczyk) in the Polonia Wroclaw Chess Cup - GM Tournament in Wrocław and shared 1st place (together with Łukasz Cyborowski and Daniel Sadzikowski) in the 8th International Tournament of Polonia Wroclaw Chess Club - Open A, also in Wroclaw. In 2016, he shared second place (behind Andrey Vovk) in the tournament 5° Open Internazionale del Salento - A in Gallipoli. In 2017, Oskar Wieczorek shared the 2nd place in the tournament 5º Festival di Gabicce Mare - A in Gabicce Mare. In 2018, he took the 1st place on his own in the XXXIV Cup of the Lower Silesian Voivode in Legnica, ahead of i.a. Grzegorz Nasuta and Paweł Teclaf.

Oskar Wieczorek achieved the highest rating in his career so far on May 1, 2022, with a score of 2505 points, he was ranked 26th among Polish chess players.
