= Marian Duś =

Polish bishop (1938–2021)

His Eminence Marian Duś PhD
- Auxiliary Bishop Emeritus of Warsaw
- Church: Latin Church
- Archdiocese: Warsaw
- Appointed: 21 December 1985
- Installed: 6 January 1986
- Term ended: 4 November 2013
- Other post: Titular Bishop of Thenae

Orders
- Ordination: 9 June 1968 by Cardinal Stefan Wyszyński
- Consecration: 6 June 1986 by Cardinal Józef Glemp
- Rank: Bishop

Personal details
- Born: 25 June 1938 Róża, Poland
- Died: 9 September 2021 (aged 83) Warsaw, Poland
- Denomination: Catholic
- Education: Catholic University of Lublin
- Motto: In Cruce salus (Salvation in the cross)

Marian Duś (25 June 1938 – 9 September 2021) was a Polish Roman Catholic Bishop.

He was a Doctor of Philosophy in the field of social sciences.

He served as an Auxiliary Bishop of Warsaw in the years from 1986 to 2013, and from 2013 to 2021 as the Auxiliary Bishop Emeritus of the Roman Catholic Archdiocese of Warsaw.

Duś died from COVID-19 in 2021, at the age of 83, during the COVID-19 pandemic in Poland.
