= Maria Zbyrowska =

Polish politician

member of Sejm 2005-2007
- In office 25 September 2005 – 2007

Personal details
- Born: 1956 (age 69–70)
- Party: Samoobrona

Maria Zbyrowska (born 2 November 1956 in Jaźwiny, Podkarpackie Voivodeship) is a Polish politician. She was elected to the Sejm on 25 September 2005, getting 12171 votes in 23 Rzeszów district, as a candidate from Samoobrona Rzeczpospolitej Polskiej list.

She was also a member of Sejm 2001-2005.

== See also ==
- Members of Polish Sejm 2005-2007
