= Golemki =

- Village
- Location within Poland
- Coordinates: 50°4′N 21°16′E
- Country: Poland
- Voivodeship: Subcarpathian
- County: Dębica
- Gmina: Czarna

Golemki [ɡɔˈlɛmki] is a village in the administrative district of Gmina Czarna, within Dębica County, Subcarpathian Voivodeship, in south-eastern Poland.
