= Gmina Czarna, Dębica County =

Gmina Czarna Czarna Commune
- Gmina
- Location within Subcarpathian Voivodeship Location within Poland
- Coordinates (Czarna): 50°3′30″N 21°14′48″E
- Country: Poland
- Voivodeship: Subcarpathian
- County: Dębica
- Seat: Czarna

Area
  - Total: 149.2 km^{2} (57.6 sq mi)

Population (2006)
  - Total: 12,487
  - Density: 83.69/km^{2} (216.8/sq mi)
- Website: www.czarna.com.pl

Gmina Czarna is a rural gmina (administrative district) in Dębica County, Subcarpathian Voivodeship, in south-eastern Poland. Its seat is the village of Czarna, which lies approximately 13 kilometres (8 mi) west of Dębica and 55 km (34 mi) west of the regional capital Rzeszów.

The gmina covers an area of 147 square kilometres (56.8 sq mi), and as of 2006 its total population is 12,487.

== Villages ==
Gmina Czarna contains the villages and settlements of Borowa, Chotowa, Czarna, Głowaczowa, Golemki, Grabiny, Jaźwiny, Podlesie, Przeryty Bór, Przyborów, Róża, Stara Jastrząbka, Stary Jawornik and Żdżary.

== Neighbouring gminas ==
Gmina Czarna is bordered by the gminas of Dębica, Lisia Góra, Pilzno, Radgoszcz, Radomyśl Wielki, Skrzyszów, Tarnów and Żyraków.
