= Wieczorek =

Wieczorek (archaic feminine: Wieczorkowa, plural Wieczorkowie) is one of the most common surnames in Poland, and the second most common in Opole Silesia (2,654) and Świętokrzyskie (2,654). The name means “little evening” in Polish. Notable people include:

- Adam Wieczorek (born 1992), Polish mixed martial artist
- Andreas Wieczorek (born 1974), German football midfielder
- Antoni Wieczorek (1924–1992), Polish ski jumper
- Bertram Wieczorek (born 1951), German physician and former politician
- Burghild Wieczorek (1943–2016), East German athlete
- Christian Wieczorek (born 1985), German football player
- Danuta Dudzińska-Wieczorek (born 1966), Polish opera singer
- Dariusz Wieczorek (born 1965), Polish politician
- Denis Wieczorek (born 1991), German figure skater
- Eva Janina Wieczorek (born 1951), Polish visual artist
- Heidemarie Wieczorek-Zeul (born 1942), German politician
- Henryk Wieczorek (born 1949), Polish football player
- Jan Wieczorek (1935–2023), Polish Roman Catholic bishop
- Kamila Wieczorek (born 1997), Polish ice hockey forward
- Kristin Wieczorek (born 1986), German figure skater
- Mariusz Wieczorek, Polish canoeist
- Max Wieczorek (born 1939), Canadian rower
- Oskar Wieczorek (born 1994), Polish chess grandmaster
- Raymond Wieczorek (1928–2022), American Republican politician
  - Raymond Wieczorek Drive
- Ryszard Wieczorek (born 1962), Polish football player and manager
- Teodor Wieczorek, Polish football player and manager
- Teresa Ciepły née Wieczorek (1937–2006), Polish sprinter and hurdler
