= Stara Jastrząbka, Podkarpackie Voivodeship =

Stara Jastrząbka
- Village
- Location within Poland
- Coordinates: 50°7′12″N 21°14′30″E
- Country: Poland
- Voivodeship: Subcarpathian
- County: Dębica
- Gmina: Czarna
- Elevation: 221 m (725 ft)
- Population: 1,600

Stara Jastrząbka [ˈstara jasˈtʂɔmpka] is a village in the administrative district of Gmina Czarna, within Dębica County, Subcarpathian Voivodeship, in south-eastern Poland.
