= Grabiny, Podkarpackie Voivodeship =

Grabiny
- Village
- Location within Poland
- Coordinates: 50°2′51″N 21°20′24″E
- Country: Poland
- Voivodeship: Subcarpathian
- County: Dębica
- Gmina: Czarna
- Population: 1,700
- Website: http://www.grabiny.yoyo.pl

Grabiny [ɡraˈbinɨ] is a village in the administrative district of Gmina Czarna, within Dębica County, Subcarpathian Voivodeship, in south-eastern Poland.
