= Głowaczowa =

- Village
- Location within Poland
- Coordinates: 50°3′N 21°19′E
- Country: Poland
- Voivodeship: Subcarpathian
- County: Dębica
- Gmina: Czarna

Głowaczowa [ɡwɔvaˈt͡ʂɔva] is a village in the administrative district of Gmina Czarna, within Dębica County, Subcarpathian Voivodeship, in south-eastern Poland.
