= Żdżary, Subcarpathian Voivodeship =

Żdżary
- Village
- Location within Poland
- Coordinates: 50°2′14″N 21°12′0″E
- Country: Poland
- Voivodeship: Subcarpathian
- County: Dębica
- Gmina: Czarna
- Population: 1,000

Żdżary [ˈʐd͡ʐarɨ] is a village in the administrative district of Gmina Czarna, within Dębica County, Subcarpathian Voivodeship, in south-eastern Poland.
