= Przeryty Bór =

- Village
- Location within Poland
- Coordinates: 50°8′N 21°16′E
- Country: Poland
- Voivodeship: Subcarpathian
- County: Dębica
- Gmina: Czarna
- Population: 140

Przeryty Bór (Polish pronunciation: [pʂɛˈrɨtɨ ˈbur]) is a village in the administrative district of Gmina Czarna, within Dębica County, Subcarpathian Voivodeship, in south-eastern Poland.
