= Borowa, Dębica County =

Borowa
- Village
- Location within Poland
- Coordinates: 50°5′N 21°17′E
- Country: Poland
- Voivodeship: Subcarpathian
- County: Dębica
- Gmina: Czarna
- Population: 740

Borowa [bɔˈrɔva] is a village in the administrative district of Gmina Czarna, within Dębica County, Subcarpathian Voivodeship, in south-eastern Poland.
