= Podlesie, Gmina Czarna =

Podlesie
- Village
- Location within Poland
- Coordinates: 50°07′33″N 21°11′49″E
- Country: Poland
- Voivodeship: Podkarpackie
- County: Dębica
- Gmina: Czarna

Podlesie [pɔdˈlɛɕɛ] is a village in the administrative district of Gmina Czarna, within Dębica County, Podkarpackie Voivodeship, in south-eastern Poland.
