= Stary Jawornik =

- Village
- Location within Poland
- Coordinates: 50°4′41″N 21°13′22″E
- Country: Poland
- Voivodeship: Subcarpathian
- County: Dębica
- Gmina: Czarna

Stary Jawornik [ˈstarɨ jaˈvɔrnik] is a village in the administrative district of Gmina Czarna, within Dębica County, Subcarpathian Voivodeship, in south-eastern Poland.
