= Łukasz Cyborowski =

Polish chess grandmaster (born 1980)

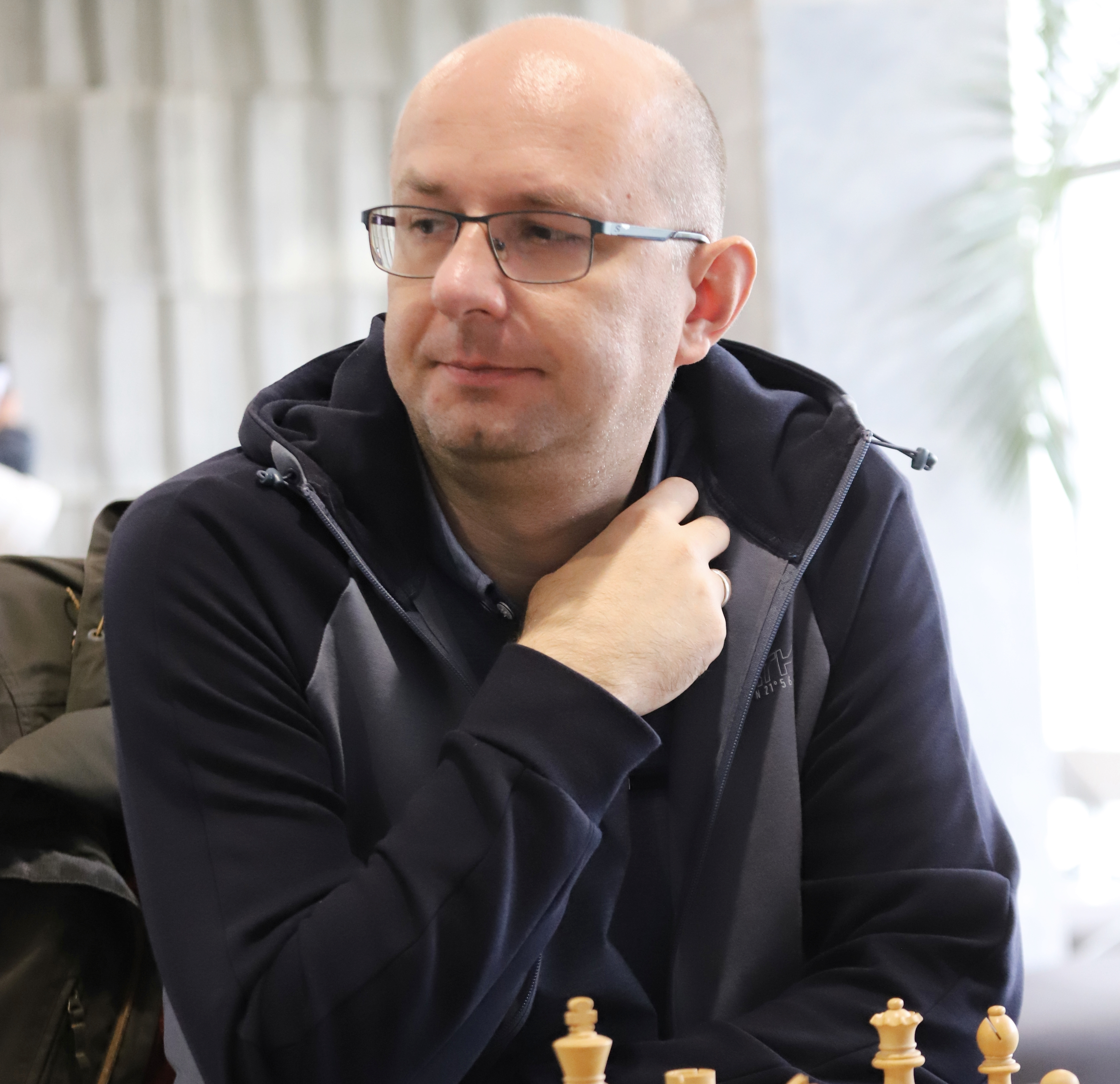
- Cyborowski in 2021

Personal information
- Born: 21 June 1980 (age 46) Legnica, Poland

Chess career
- Country: Poland
- Title: Grandmaster (2003)
- FIDE rating: 2455 (August 2026)
- Peak rating: 2580 (January 2007)

Łukasz Cyborowski (born 21 June 1980) is a Polish chess Grandmaster (2003).

== Chess career ==
Łukasz Cyborowski is a multiple medalist of the Polish Junior Chess Championship: gold in 1997 (U18), silver in 1992 (U12). In 2001, he won bronze in Polish Chess Championship. He won or shared first place in the international chess tournaments in

- 2001 Wrocław (Adolf Anderssen memorial);
- 2002 Grodzisk Mazowiecki (Miguel Najdorf memorial);
- 2003 Lippstadt;
- 2003/04 (Kraków) (tournament Cracovia);
- 2005 Legnica;
- 2005 Chojnice;
- 2008 Karpacz;
- 2010 Rewal (tournament Konik Morski Rewala);
- 2014 Koszalin (Józefa Kochana memorial).

Łukasz Cyborowski has also competed successfully in several Polish Team Chess Championships (individual gold in 2002, 2004, 2006, 2009, and team silver in 2003, 2004, 2005, 2006, 2008, 2010).

Łukasz Cyborowski played for Poland in Chess Olympiads:

- In 2004, at second reserve board in the 36th Chess Olympiad in Calvià (+1, =2, -1).
