= Róża, Podkarpackie Voivodeship =

Róża
- Village
- Location within Poland
- Coordinates: 50°6′44″N 21°18′9″E
- Country: Poland
- Voivodeship: Subcarpathian
- County: Dębica
- Gmina: Czarna
- Population: 1,400

Róża [ˈruʐa] is a village in the administrative district of Gmina Czarna, within Dębica County, Subcarpathian Voivodeship, in south-eastern Poland.
