= Euroregion Praděd =

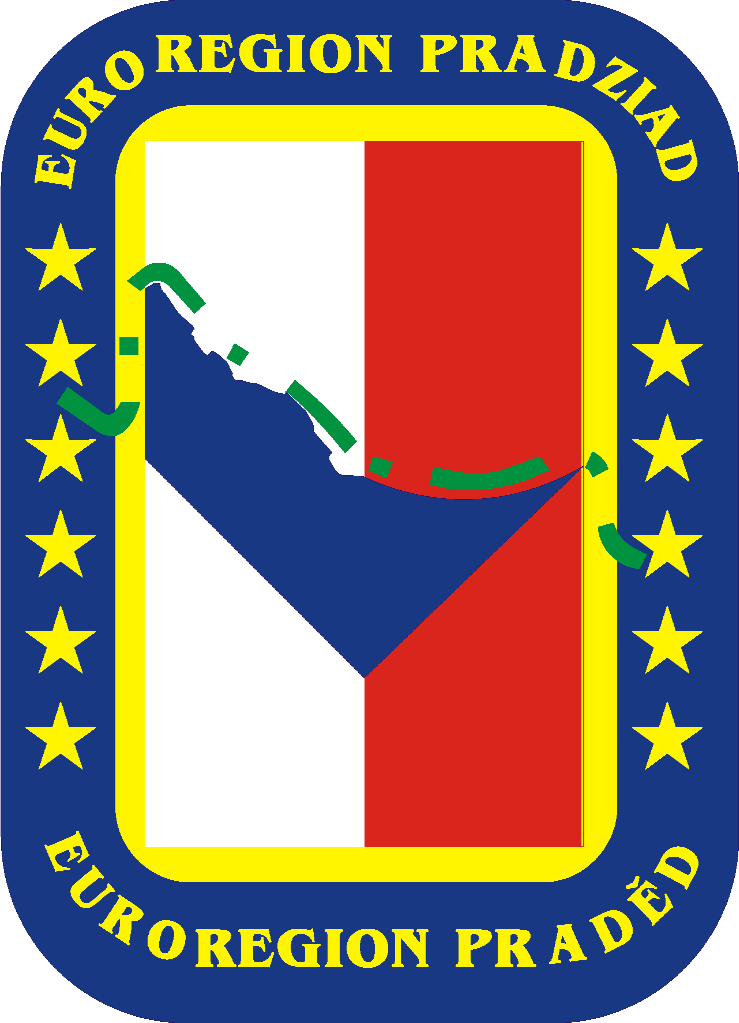
Logo

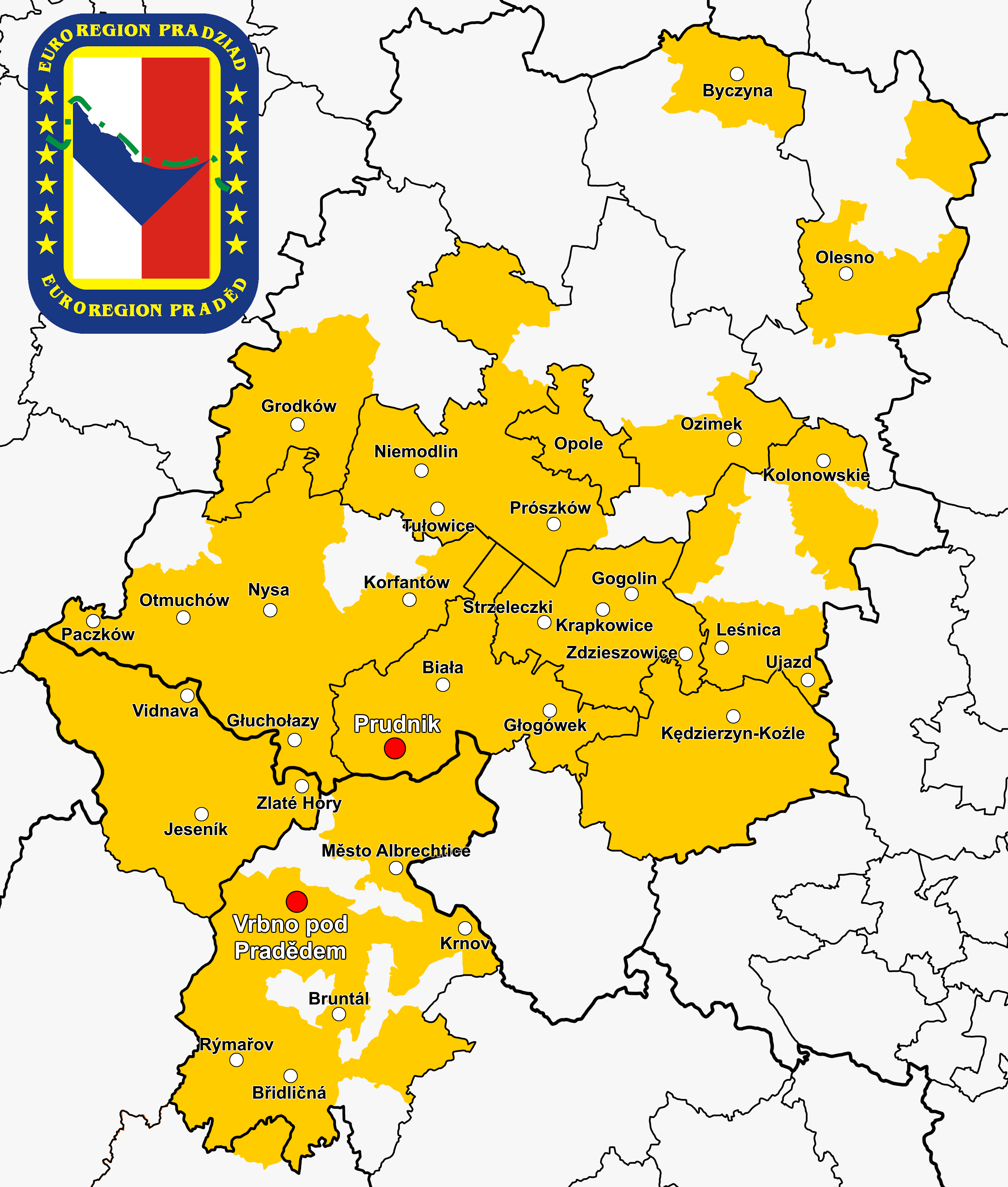
Map

The Euroregion Pradziad (Polish) or Euroregion Praděd (Czech) is a Euroregion joining parts of the Poland and Czech Republic. It was created on 2 July 1997 in Jeseník.

The headquarters of Euroregion Praděd are Prudnik and Vrbno pod Pradědem.

== The region ==
Country	Poland	Czech Republic	Total
Area	5 239 km²	1 900 km²	7 139 km²
Population	673 202	673 202	799 122
Districts	75	45	120

=== Constituent regions ===
- (Poland) : Gmina Biała, Gmina Bierawa, Gmina Byczyna, Gmina Chrząstowice, Gmina Dąbrowa, Gmina Cisek, Gmina Głogówek, Gmina Głuchołazy, Gmina Gogolin, Gmina Grodków, Gmina Izbicko, Gmina Jemielnica, Kędzierzyn-Koźle, Gmina Kolonowskie, Gmina Komprachcice, Gmina Korfantów, Gmina Krapkowice, Gmina Leśnica, Gmina Lubrza, Opole Voivodeship, Gmina Niemodlin, Gmina Nysa, Gmina Olszanka, Opole, Gmina Otmuchów, Gmina Ozimek, Gmina Paczków, Gmina Pakosławice, Gmina Pawłowiczki, Gmina Polska Cerekiew, Gmina Popielów, Gmina Prudnik, Gmina Prószków, Gmina Reńska Wieś, Gmina Rudniki, Gmina Skoroszyce, Gmina Strzeleczki, Gmina Tułowice, Gmina Ujazd, Gmina Walce, Gmina Zdzieszowice
- (Czech Republic) : Bruntál District, Jeseník District

== Gallery ==
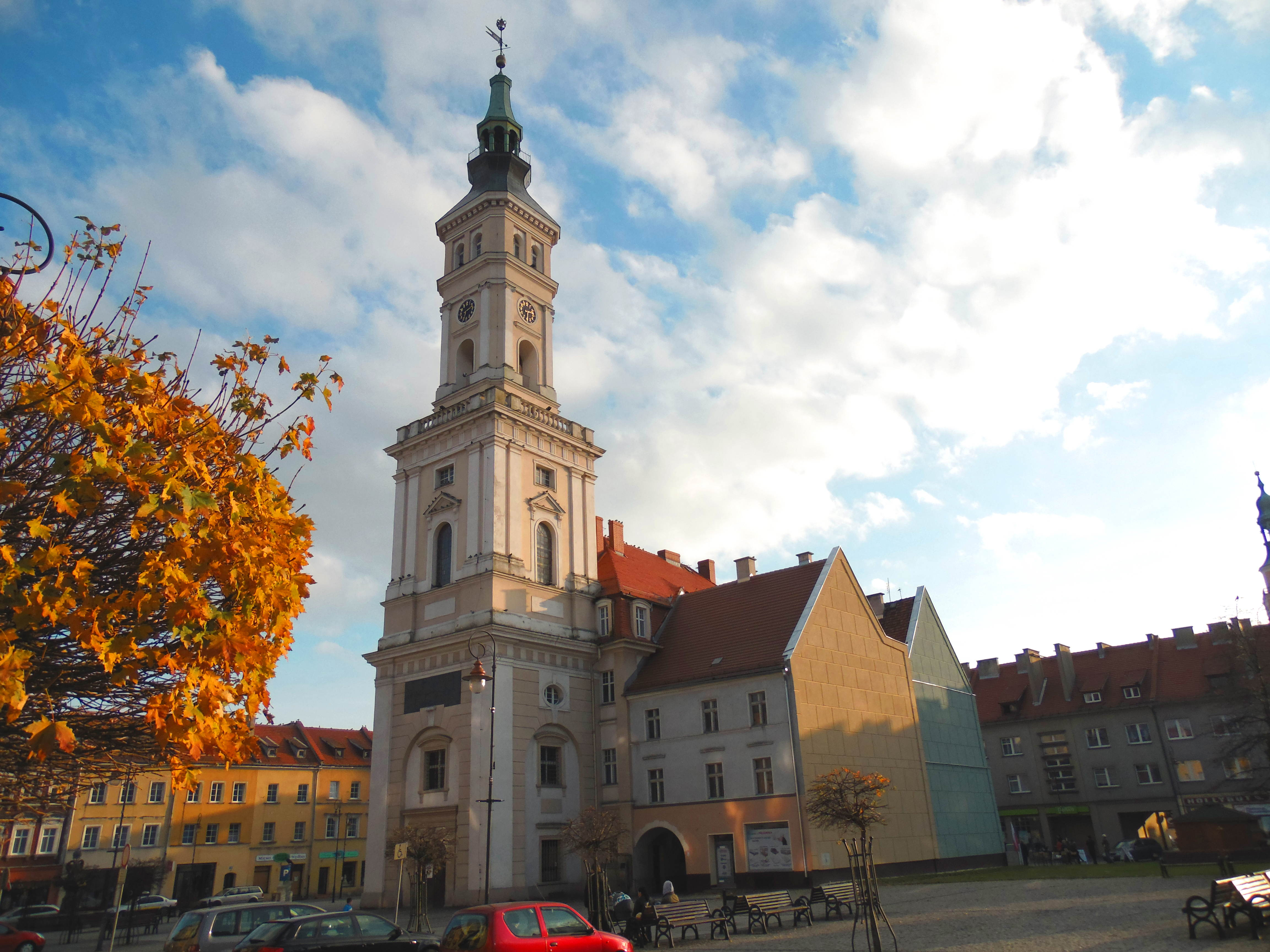
Prudnik

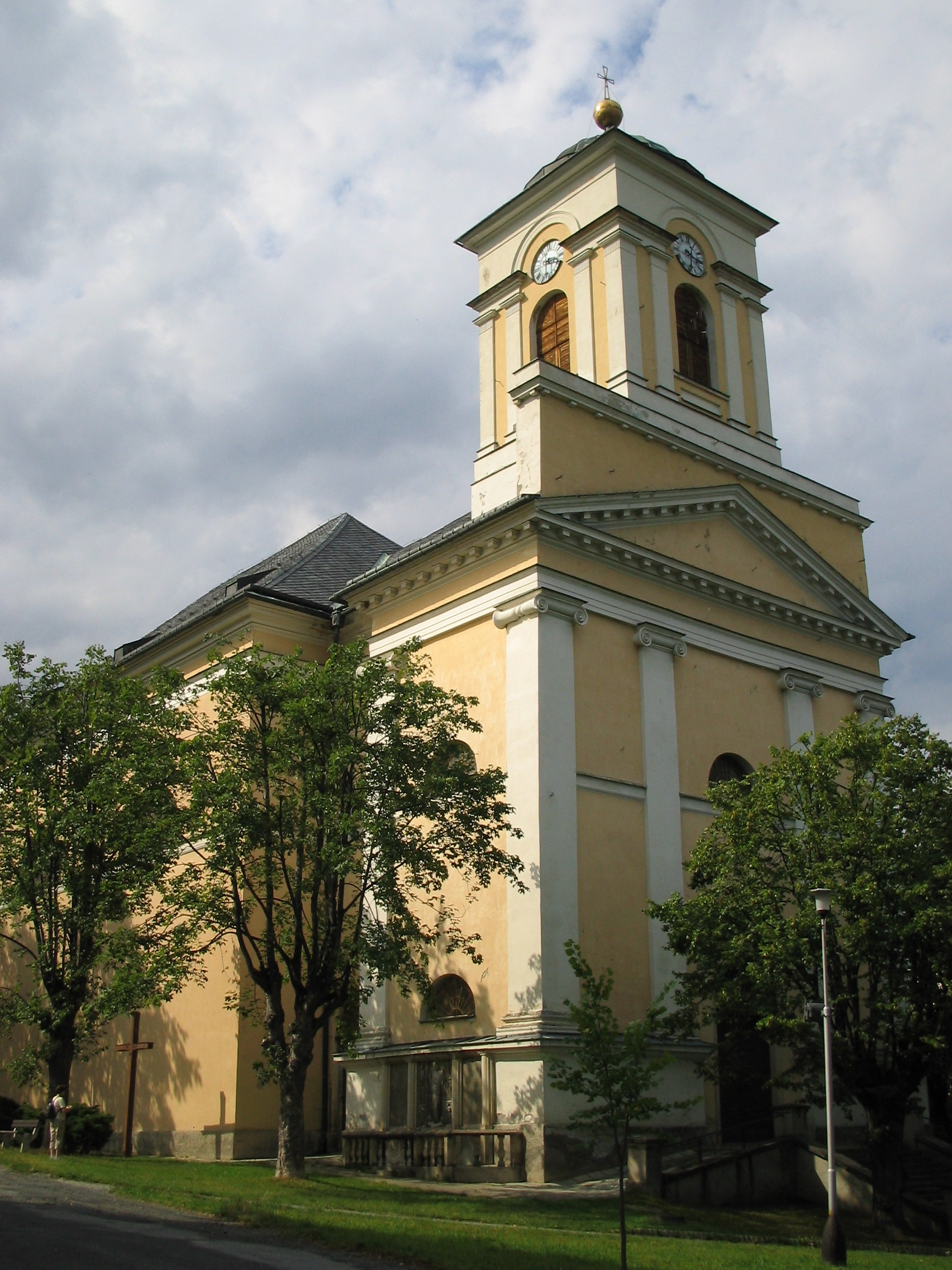
Vrbno pod Pradědem

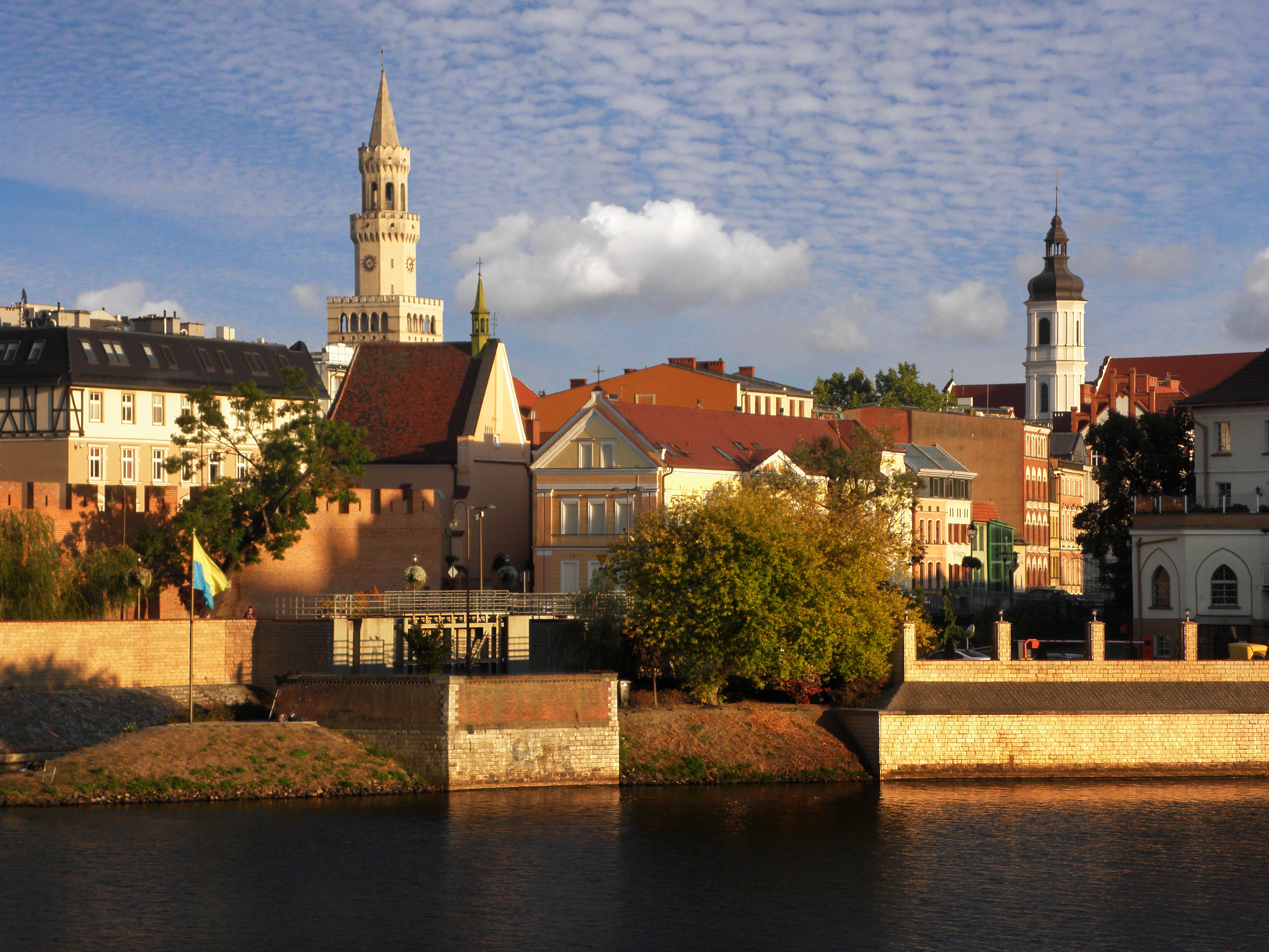
Opole

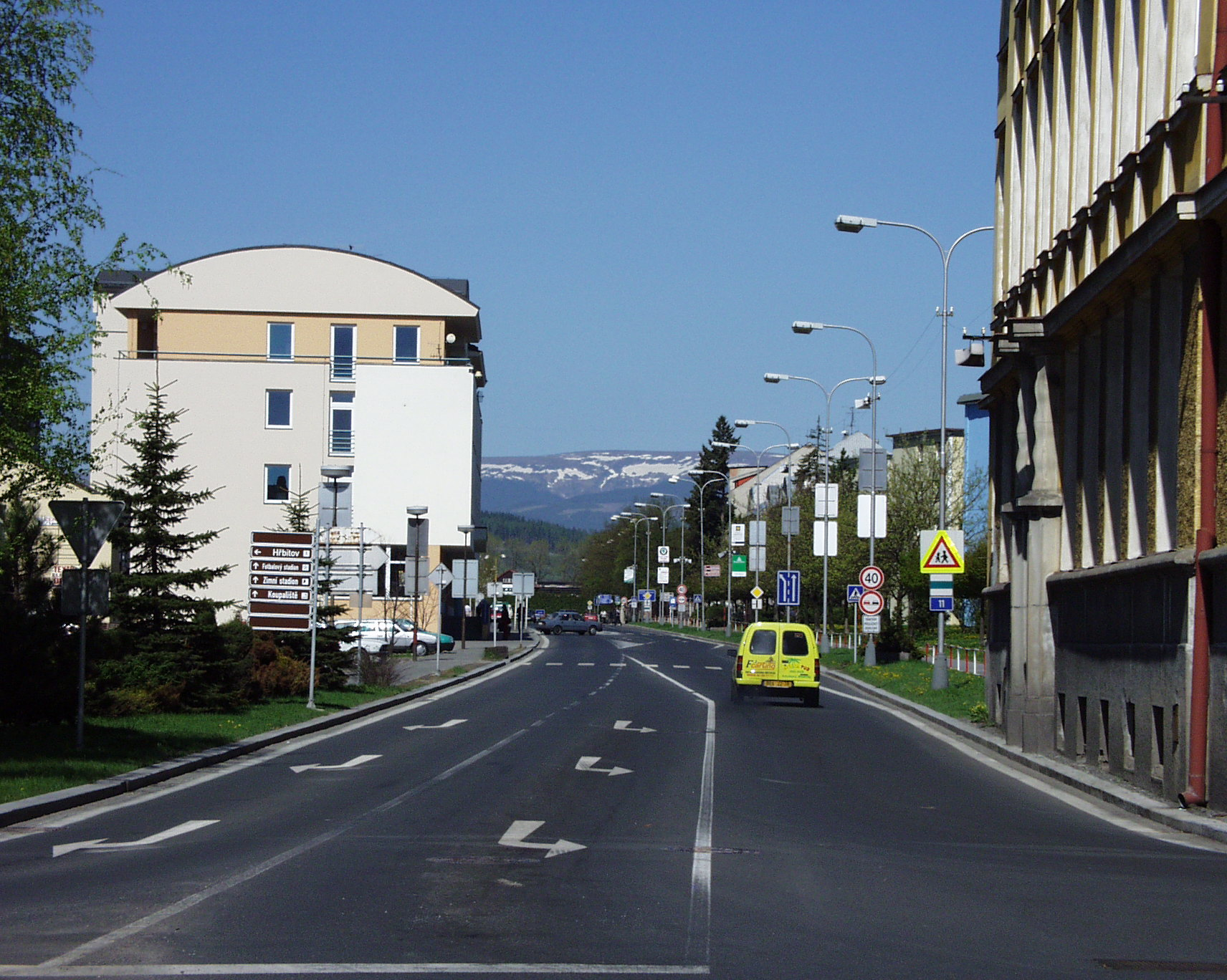
Bruntál

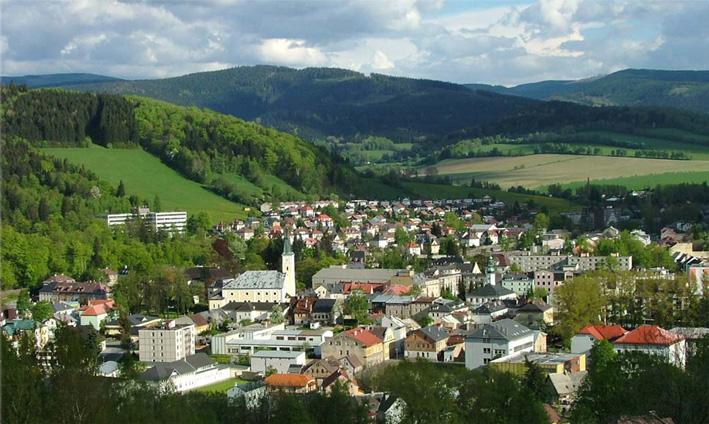
Jeseník

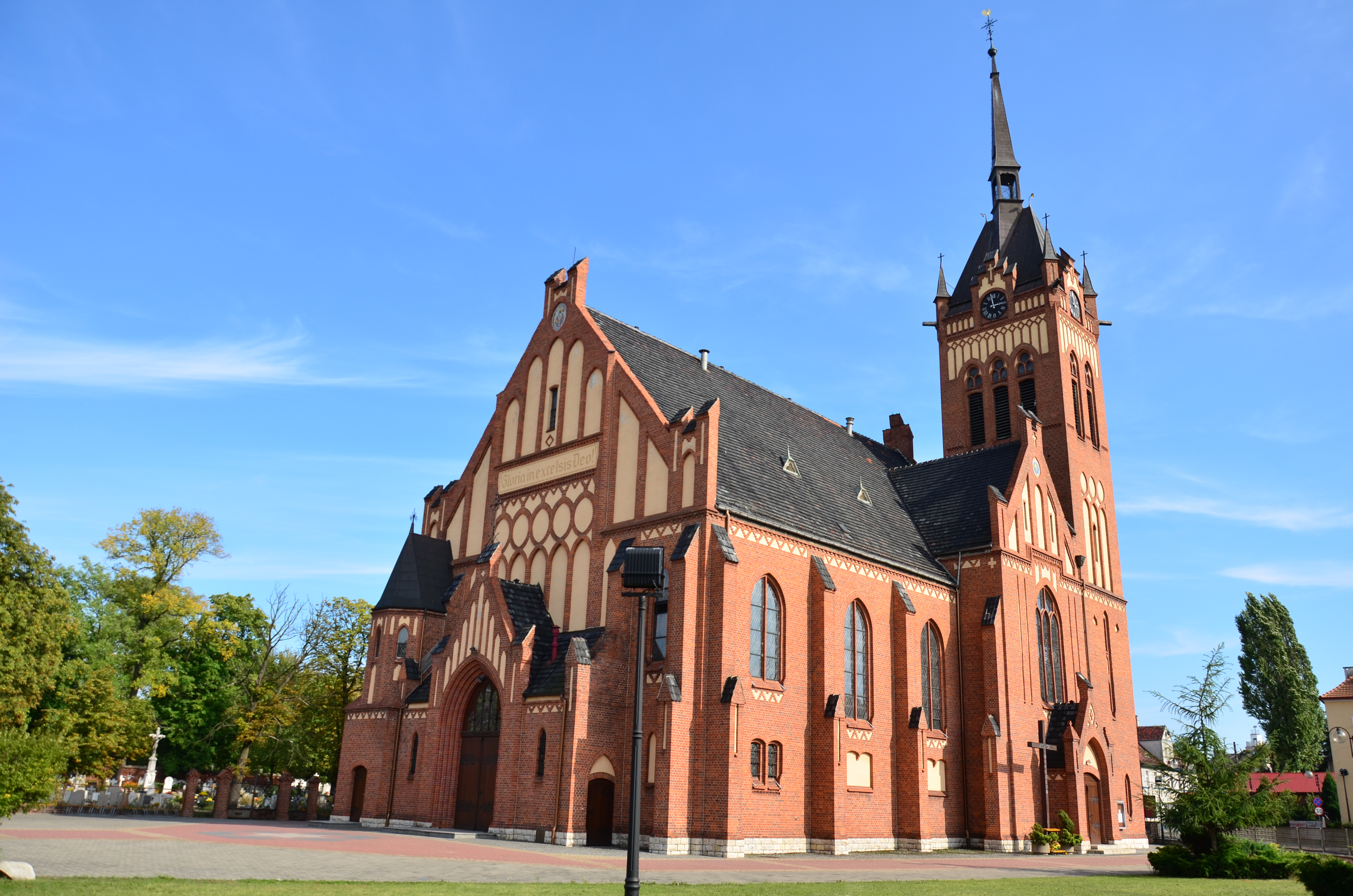
Kędzierzyn-Koźle

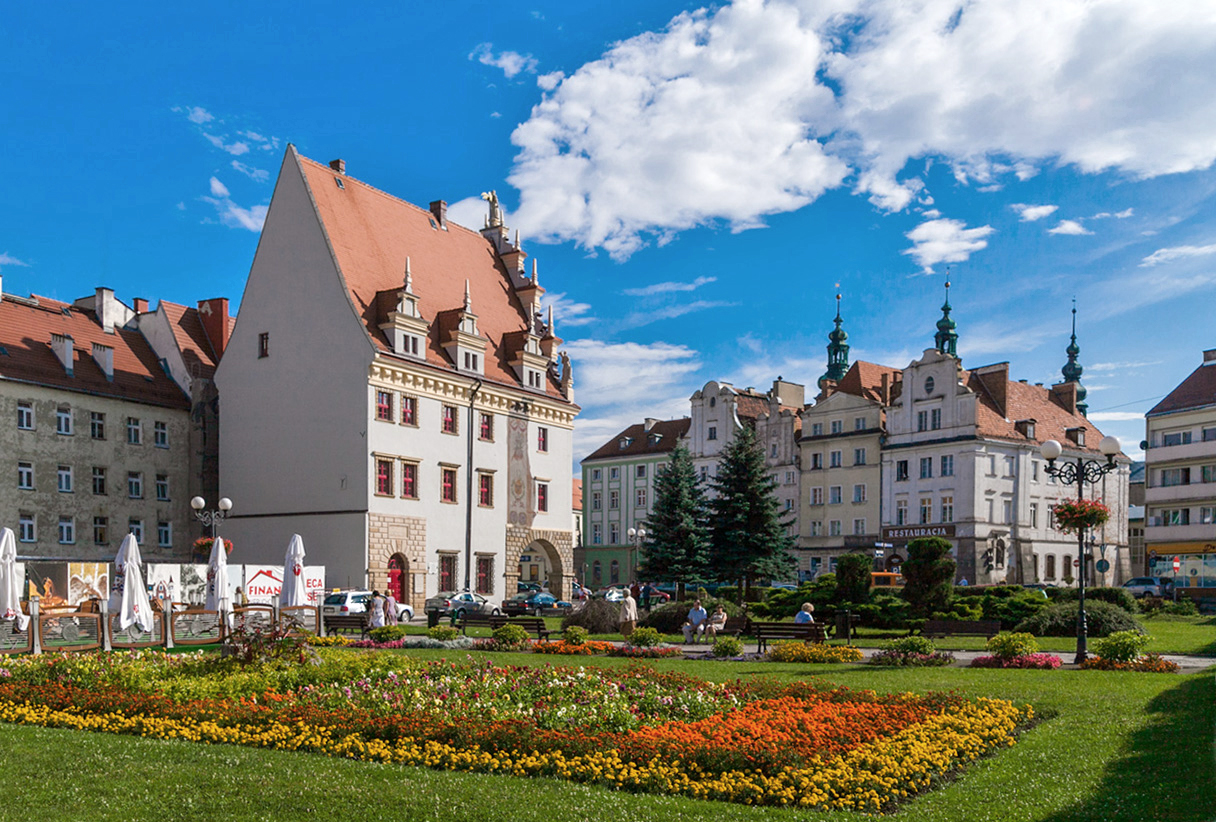
Nysa

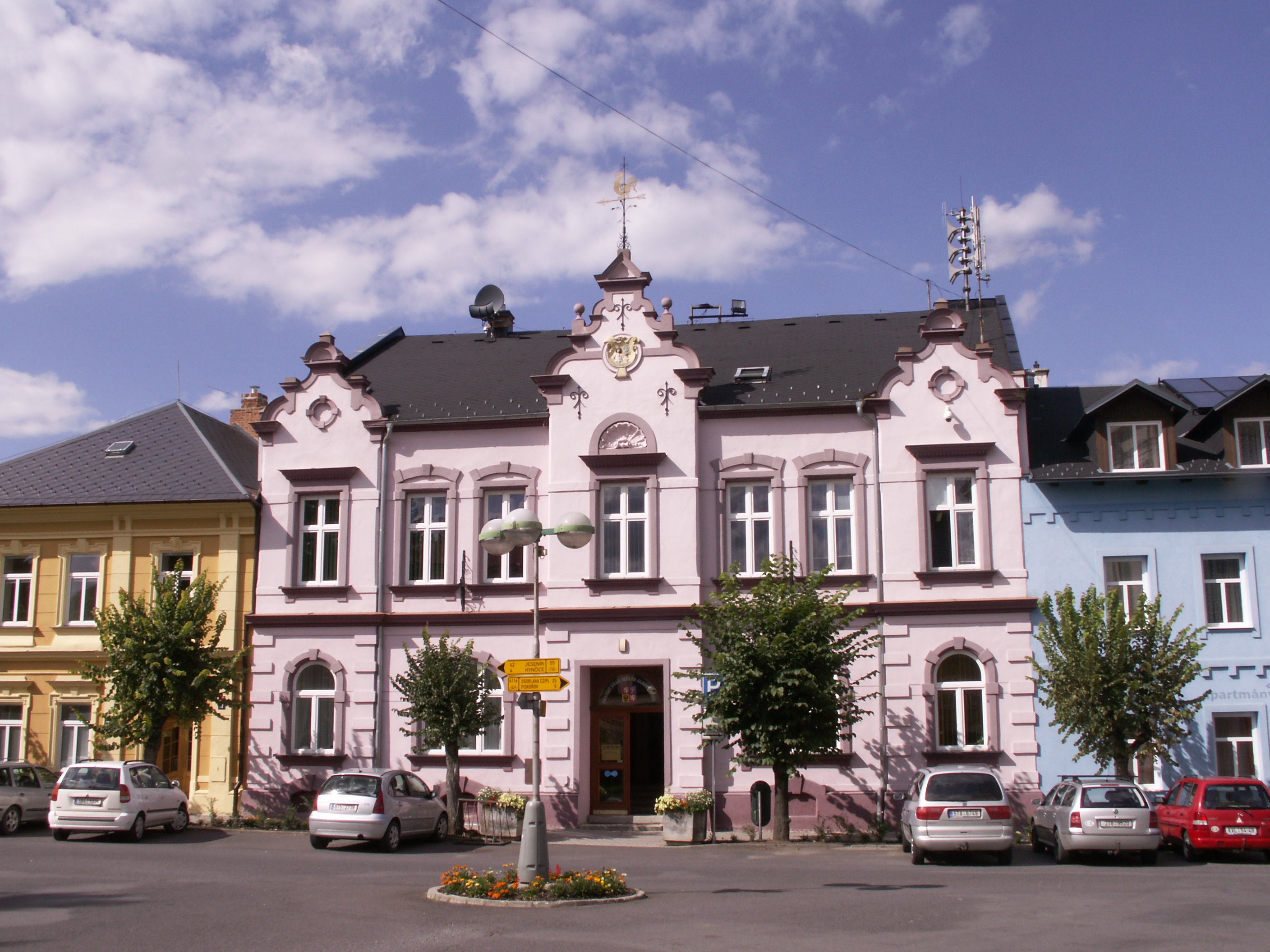
Město Albrechtice

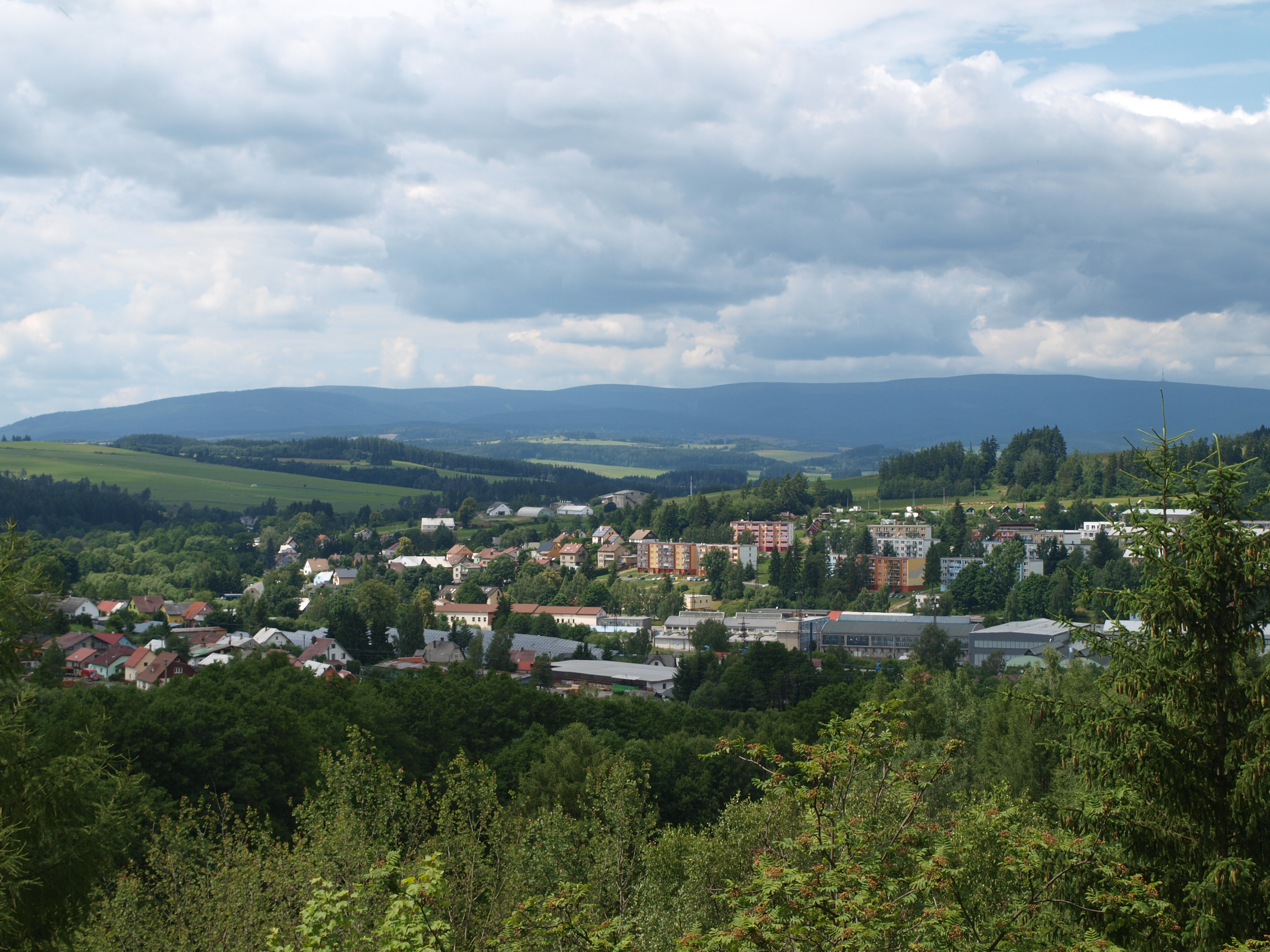
Břidličná

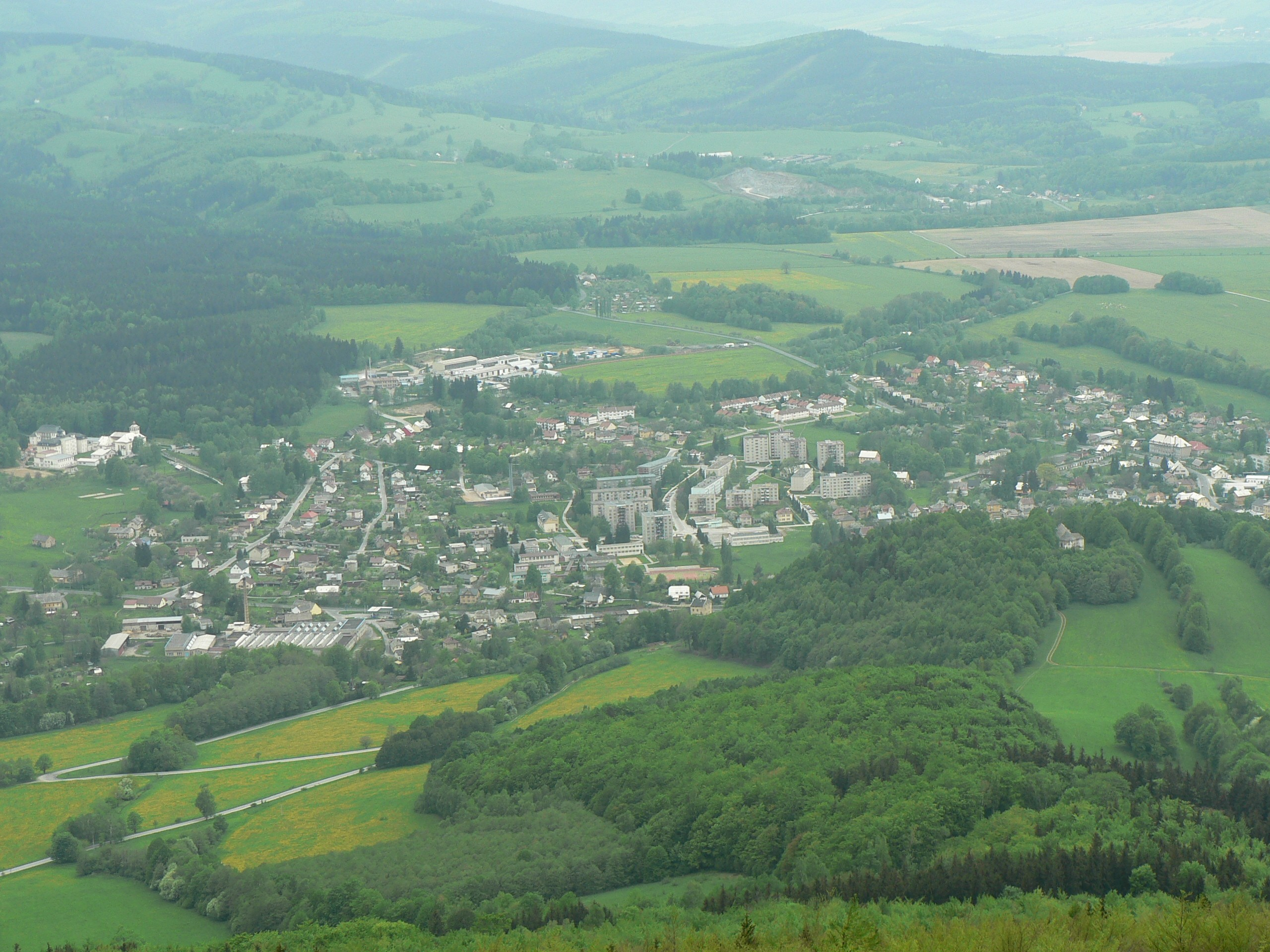
Zlaté Hory
