= Jaźwiny, Podkarpackie Voivodeship =

Jaźwiny
- Village
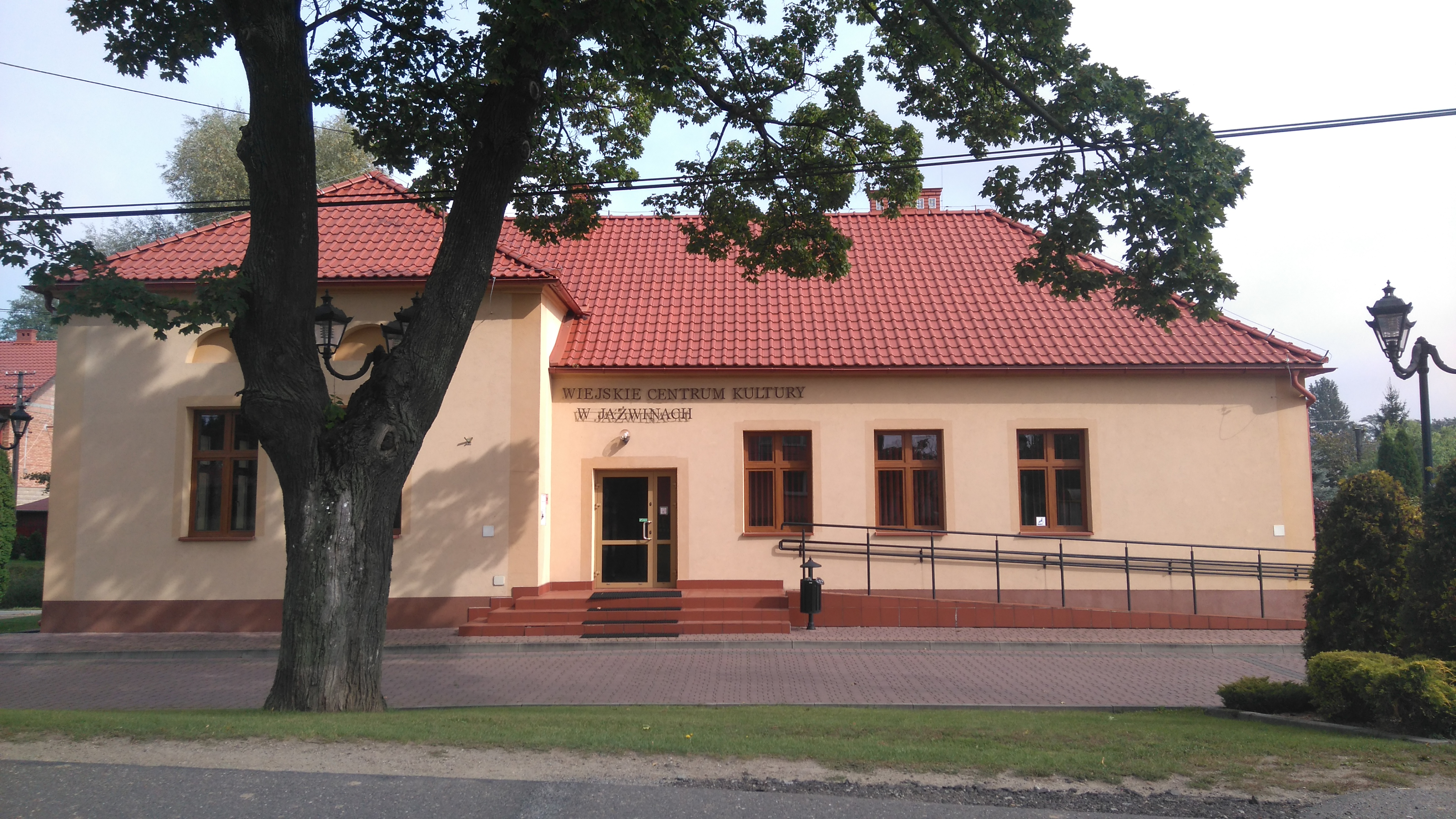
- Culture Center in Jaźwiny

- Location within Poland
- Coordinates: 50°5′N 21°15′E
- Country: Poland
- Voivodeship: Subcarpathian
- County: Dębica
- Gmina: Czarna
- Time zone: UTC+1 (CET)
  - Summer (DST): UTC+2 (CEST)
- Vehicle registration: RDE

Jaźwiny [jaʑˈvinɨ] is a village in the administrative district of Gmina Czarna, within Dębica County, Subcarpathian Voivodeship, in south-eastern Poland.

Five Polish citizens were murdered by Nazi Germany in the village during World War II.
