= Opole Medical School =

Medical school in Opole, Poland

Coordinates: 50°40′12″N 17°56′10″E

- Państwowa Medyczna Wyższa Szkoła Zawodowa w Opolu
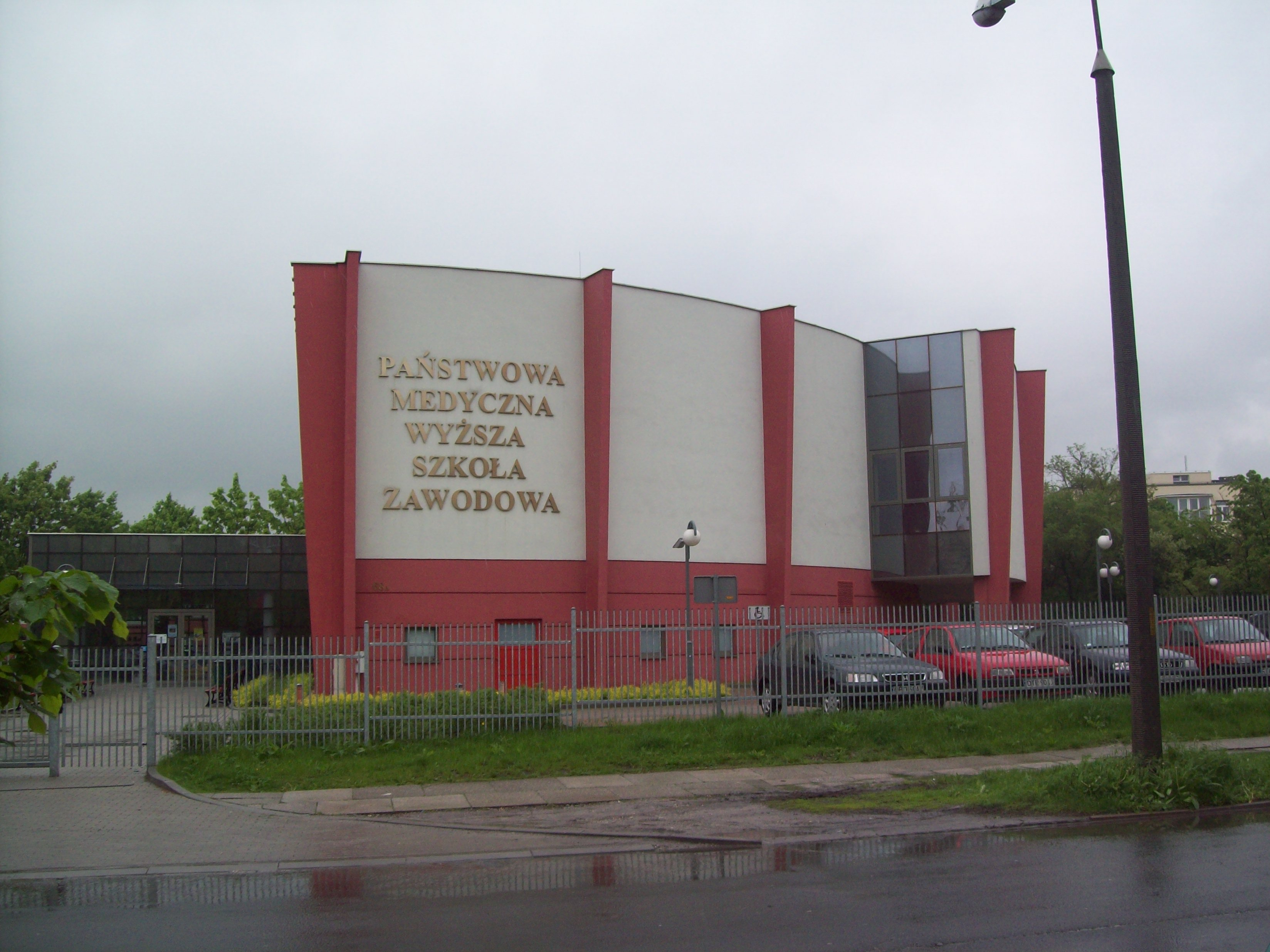
- Type: Public University
- Established: 2003
- Rector: Tomasz Halski
- Location: Katowicka 68, 45-050 Opole, Opole, Poland
- Website: wsm.opole.pl

The Opole Medical School (Polish: PMWSZ - Państwowa Medyczna Wyższa Szkoła Zawodowa) is a state-owned medical school in Opole. The school was established in May 2003. In 2020, it was merged into the University of Opole.

== Curriculum ==
PMWSZ teaches in the areas of obstetrics, nursing, physiotherapy, public health, and cosmetology. With the consent of the Polish Ministry of Science and Higher Education, they also teach medical emergency.
