= Chotowa =

- Village
- Location within Poland
- Coordinates: 50°1′N 21°18′E
- Country: Poland
- Voivodeship: Subcarpathian
- County: Dębica
- Gmina: Czarna
- Population: 618

Chotowa [xɔˈtɔva] is a village in the administrative district of Gmina Czarna, within Dębica County, Subcarpathian Voivodeship, in south-eastern Poland.

The 2010 World Junior Chess Championship took place in Chotowa.
