= Czarna, Dębica County =

Czarna
- Village
- Location within Poland
- Coordinates: 50°3′30″N 21°14′48″E
- Country: Poland
- Voivodeship: Subcarpathian
- County: Dębica
- Gmina: Czarna
- Population: 2,474

Czarna [ˈt͡ʂarna] is a village in Dębica County, Subcarpathian Voivodeship, in south-eastern Poland. It is the seat of the gmina (administrative district) called Gmina Czarna.
