= Pien =

Pien may refer to:

== Geography ==
- Piên, a town in Brazil
- Two towns in Poland:
  - Pień, Kuyavian-Pomeranian Voivodeship
  - Pień, Podkarpackie Voivodeship
- Pien, Burkina Faso
- Pianu (German: Pien; Hungarian: Felsőpián), a commune located in Alba County, Romania

== People ==
- Pien, affectionate nickname for Jacqueline (given name), Josephine or Francine in the Netherlands
- Armand Pien (1920-2003), Belgian weatherman
- Ed Pien (1958), Canadian artist born in Taiwan
- Lark Pien (1972), American cartoonist
- Pien Sanders (1998), Dutch field hockey player
- Bian Que (redirect from Pien Ch'iao) (died 310 BC) Chinese physician
- Bian Zhilin (redirect from Pien Chih-lin) (Chinese: 卞之琳 1910–2000)
- José Lacasa Piens, founder of Lacasa, the oldest chocolate factory in Spain

== Other ==
- Piens ("milk"), Latvian album by The Satellites 1998
- Pien tze huang (片仔癀; Piànzǎihuáng) Chinese herbal formula first time documented during the Ming Dynasty (1555)
- Pien Fu (Chinese: 弁服; pinyin: biànfú) knee-length tunic over a skirt or pair of pants
- Bianhua, the concept of gradual transformation in Confucian or Taoist philosophy
- ぴえん (pien), related to the pleading face emoji
