= Gmina Czermin =

Gmina Czermin may refer to either of the following rural administrative districts in Poland:

- Gmina Czermin, Subcarpathian Voivodeship
- Gmina Czermin, Greater Poland Voivodeship
