= Rydzów =

- Village
- Location within Poland
- Coordinates: 50°14′N 21°21′E
- Country: Poland
- Voivodeship: Subcarpathian
- County: Mielec
- Gmina: Mielec
- Population: 348

Rydzów [ˈrɨd͡zuf] is a village in the administrative district of Gmina Mielec, within Mielec County, Subcarpathian Voivodeship, in south-eastern Poland.
