= Brzyście, Mielec County =

Brzyście
- Village
- Location within Poland
- Coordinates: 50°22′N 21°24′E
- Country: Poland
- Voivodeship: Subcarpathian
- County: Mielec
- Gmina: Gawłuszowice

Brzyście [ˈbʐɨɕt͡ɕɛ] is a village in the administrative district of Gmina Gawłuszowice, within Mielec County, Subcarpathian Voivodeship, in south-eastern Poland.
