= Janowiec, Podkarpackie Voivodeship =

Janowiec
- Village
- Location within Poland
- Coordinates: 50°09′18″N 21°11′32″E
- Country: Poland
- Voivodeship: Podkarpackie
- County: Mielec
- Gmina: Radomyśl Wielki
- Website: http://www.radomyslwielki.pl/

Janowiec [jaˈnɔvjɛt͡s] is a village in the administrative district of Gmina Radomyśl Wielki, within Mielec County, Podkarpackie Voivodeship, in south-eastern Poland.
