= Piechocki =

Piechocki is a Polish-language surname derived from the placename Piechoty. Notable people with this surname include:

- Chris Piechocki (born 1979), Australian actor
- Kacper Piechocki (born 1995), Polish volleyball player
- Virgile Piechocki (born 1997), French footballer

== See also ==
- Piechota
