= Podleszany =

- Village
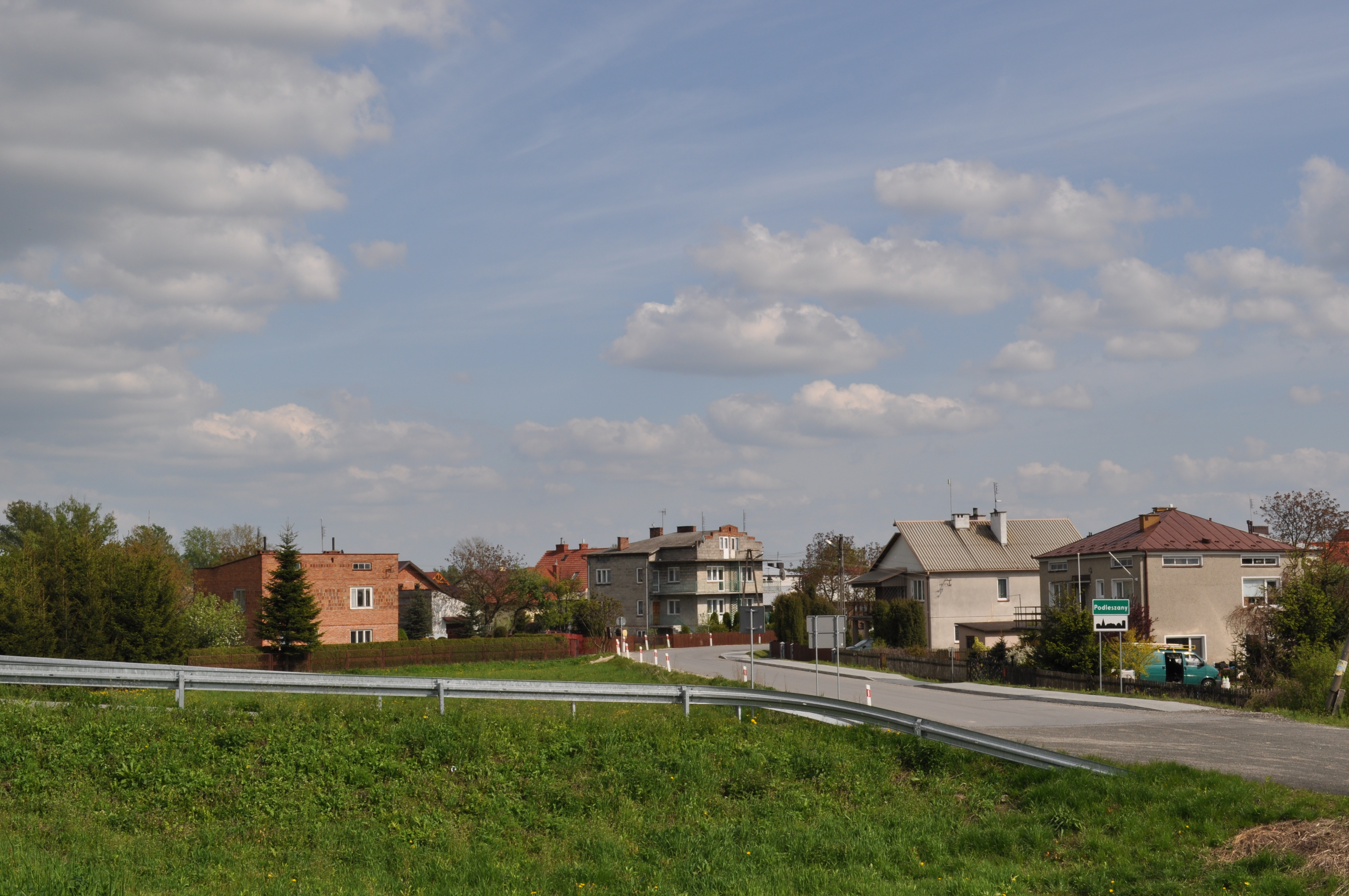
- Podleszany

- Location within Poland
- Coordinates: 50°16′N 21°25′E
- Country: Poland
- Voivodeship: Subcarpathian
- County: Mielec
- Gmina: Mielec
- Population: 1,562

Podleszany [pɔdlɛˈʂanɨ] is a village in the administrative district of Gmina Mielec, within Mielec County, Subcarpathian Voivodeship, in south-eastern Poland.
