= Górki, Mielec County =

Górki
- Village
- Location within Poland
- Coordinates: 50°22′N 21°16′E
- Country: Poland
- Voivodeship: Subcarpathian
- County: Mielec
- Gmina: Borowa
- Population: 510

Górki [ˈɡurki] is a village in the administrative district of Gmina Borowa, within Mielec County, Subcarpathian Voivodeship, in south-eastern Poland.
