= Podborze, Podkarpackie Voivodeship =

Podborze
- Village
- Location within Poland
- Coordinates: 50°14′N 21°20′E
- Country: Poland
- Voivodeship: Subcarpathian
- County: Mielec
- Gmina: Radomyśl Wielki

Podborze [pɔdˈbɔʐɛ] is a village in the administrative district of Gmina Radomyśl Wielki, within Mielec County, Subcarpathian Voivodeship, in south-eastern Poland.
