= Jamy, Podkarpackie Voivodeship =

Jamy
- Village
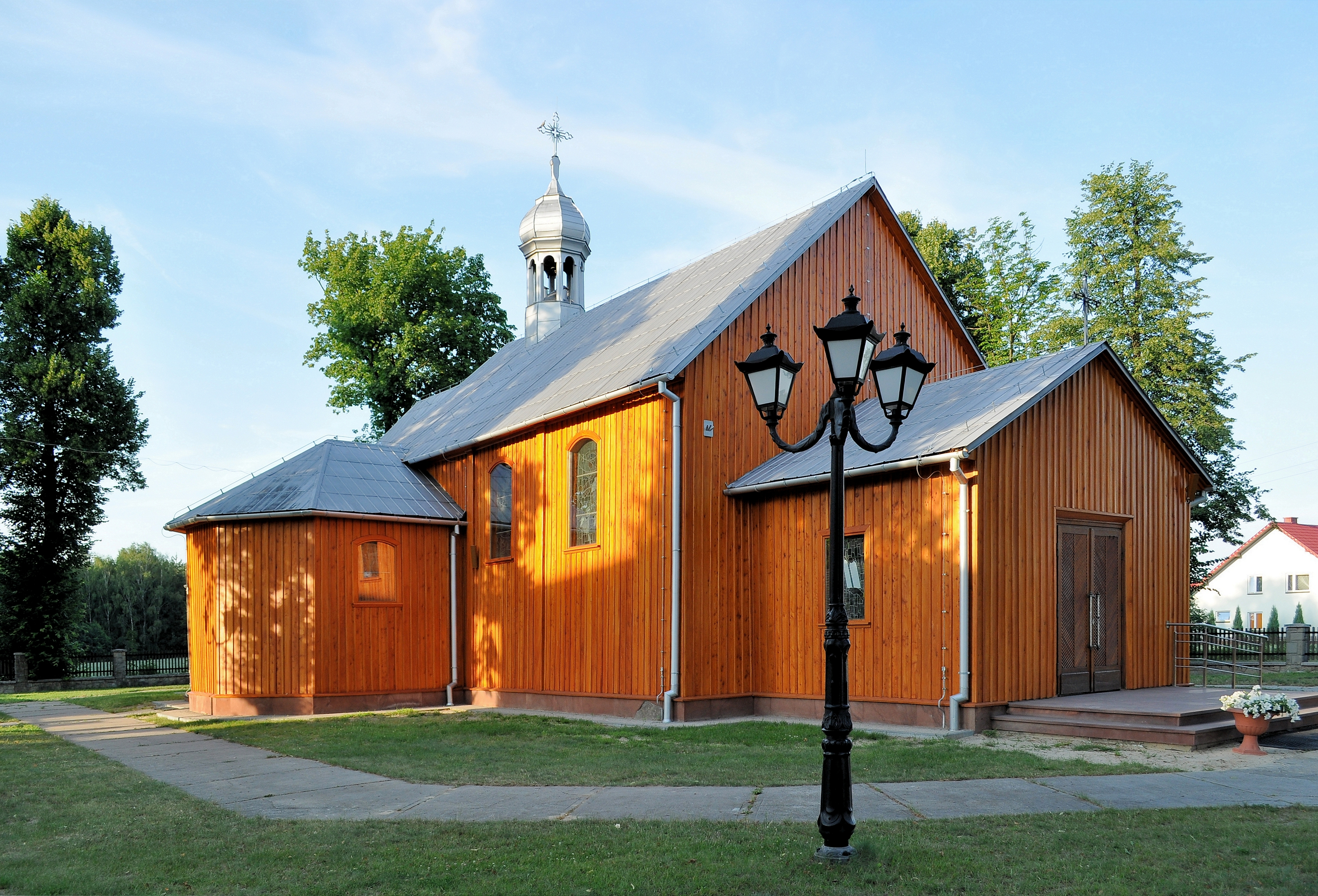
- Saint Augustinus church

- Location within Poland
- Coordinates: 50°14′N 21°12′E
- Country: Poland
- Voivodeship: Subcarpathian
- County: Mielec
- Gmina: Wadowice Górne

Jamy [ˈjamɨ] is a village in the administrative district of Gmina Wadowice Górne, within Mielec County, Subcarpathian Voivodeship, in south-eastern Poland.
