= Podlesie, Mielec County =

Podlesie
- Settlement
- Location within Poland
- Coordinates: 50°16′44″N 21°18′46″E
- Country: Poland
- Voivodeship: Subcarpathian
- County: Mielec
- Gmina: Wadowice Górne

Podlesie [pɔdˈlɛɕɛ] is a settlement in the administrative district of Gmina Wadowice Górne, within Mielec County, Subcarpathian Voivodeship, in south-eastern Poland.
