= Koniec, Podkarpackie Voivodeship =

Koniec
- Settlement
- Location within Poland
- Coordinates: 50°15′17″N 21°13′59″E
- Country: Poland
- Voivodeship: Subcarpathian
- County: Mielec
- Gmina: Wadowice Górne

Koniec [ˈkɔɲɛt͡s] (translation: The End) is a settlement in the administrative district of Gmina Wadowice Górne, within Mielec County, Subcarpathian Voivodeship, in south-eastern Poland.
