= Zgórsko, Podkarpackie Voivodeship =

Zgórsko
- Village
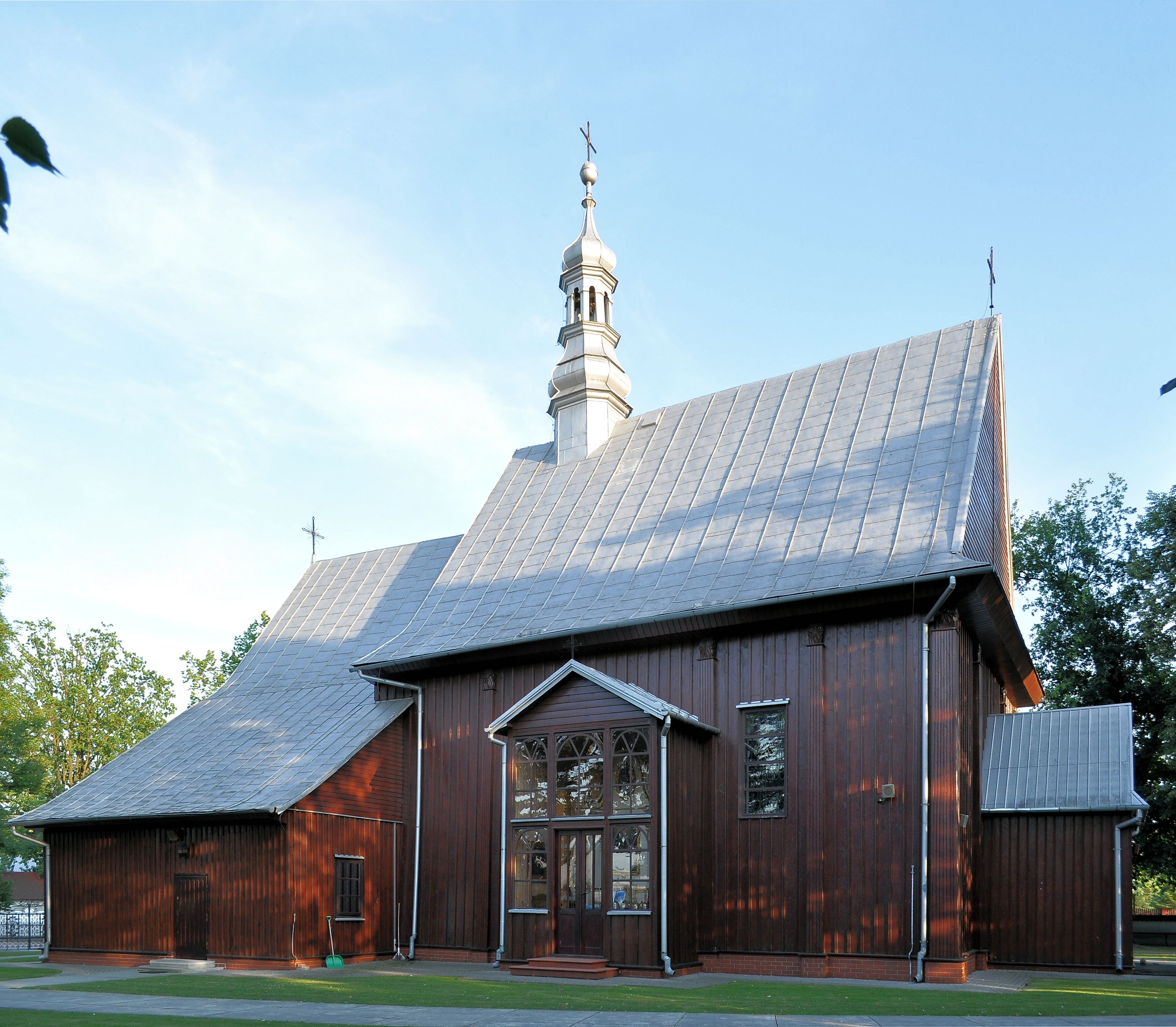
- Saint Nicholas church

- Location within Poland
- Coordinates: 50°14′22″N 21°17′27″E
- Country: Poland
- Voivodeship: Podkarpackie
- County: Mielec
- Gmina: Radomyśl Wielki

Zgórsko [ˈzɡurskɔ] is a village in the administrative district of Gmina Radomyśl Wielki, within Mielec County, Podkarpackie Voivodeship, in south-eastern Poland.
