= Kębłów =

Kębłów may refer to the following places in Poland:

- Kębłów, Lower Silesian Voivodeship (south-west Poland)
- Kębłów, Lublin Voivodeship (east Poland)
- Kębłów, Subcarpathian Voivodeship (south-east Poland)
