= Krzemienica, Mielec County =

Krzemienica
- Village
- Location within Poland
- Coordinates: 50°26′N 21°27′E
- Country: Poland
- Voivodeship: Subcarpathian
- County: Mielec
- Gmina: Gawłuszowice
- Population: 481

Krzemienica [kʂɛmjɛˈnit͡sa] is a village in the administrative district of Gmina Gawłuszowice, within Mielec County, Subcarpathian Voivodeship, in south-eastern Poland.
