= Orłów, Podkarpackie Voivodeship =

Orłów
- Village
- Location within Poland
- Coordinates: 50°21′N 21°23′E
- Country: Poland
- Voivodeship: Subcarpathian
- County: Mielec
- Gmina: Borowa

Orłów [ˈɔrwuf] is a village in the administrative district of Gmina Borowa, within Mielec County, Subcarpathian Voivodeship, in south-eastern Poland. It was established in the 1780s a Galician German settlement and originally known as Schönanger.
