= Wola Pławska =

- Village
- Location within Poland
- Coordinates: 50°20′N 21°22′E
- Country: Poland
- Voivodeship: Subcarpathian
- County: Mielec
- Gmina: Borowa
- Time zone: UTC+1 (Central European Time)
- ISO 3166 code: POL

Wola Pławska [ˈvɔla ˈpwafska] is a village in the administrative district of Gmina Borowa, within Mielec County, Subcarpathian Voivodeship, in south-eastern Poland.
