= Wola Wadowska =

- Village
- Location within Poland
- Coordinates: 50°16′N 21°11′E
- Country: Poland
- Voivodeship: Subcarpathian
- County: Mielec
- Gmina: Wadowice Górne

Wola Wadowska [ˈvɔla vaˈdɔfska] is a village in the administrative district of Gmina Wadowice Górne, within Mielec County, Subcarpathian Voivodeship, in south-eastern Poland.
