= Trześń, Mielec County =

Trześń
- Village
- Location within Poland
- Coordinates: 50°20′N 21°30′E
- Country: Poland
- Voivodeship: Subcarpathian
- County: Mielec
- Gmina: Mielec
- Population: 1,291

Trześń [tʂɛɕɲ] is a village in the administrative district of Gmina Mielec, within Mielec County, Subcarpathian Voivodeship, in south-eastern Poland.
