= Trzciana, Mielec County =

Trzciana
- Village
- Location within Poland
- Coordinates: 50°18′29″N 21°20′13″E
- Country: Poland
- Voivodeship: Subcarpathian
- County: Mielec
- Gmina: Czermin
- Population: 1,300

Trzciana [ˈtʂt͡ɕana] is a village in the administrative district of Gmina Czermin, within Mielec County, Subcarpathian Voivodeship, in south-eastern Poland.

There is a church in Trzciana from the mid-20th century, the Assumption of Mary. It was built in 1960, according to the project Protazy Komornicki.

Trzciana was the village of the windmills. Until 1939, reportedly became 42, from which to the present day left only two. Windmill Sambor - stands near the cemetery and belongs to Janina Samborski.
