= Jan Vladimír Hráský =

Ing. Jan Vladimír Hráský
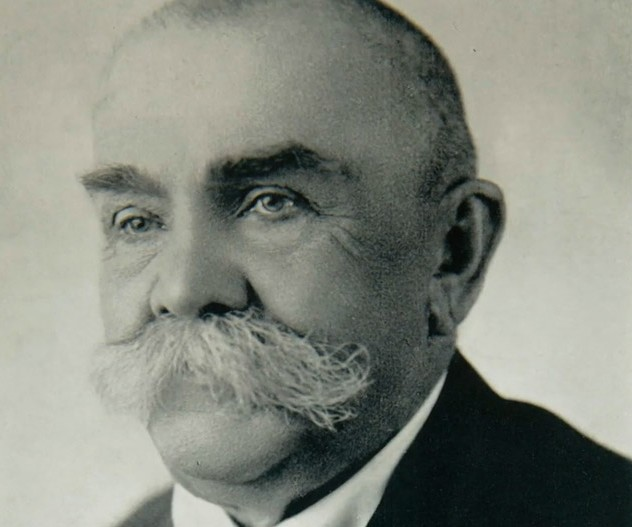
- Jan Vladimír Hráský in 1925
- Born: 20 April 1857; Babule, Galicia
- Died: 12 April 1939 (aged 81); Prague, Czechoslovakia

Jan Vladimír Hráský (20 April 1857 – 12 April 1939) was a Czech architect, builder, engineer and hydrologist.

== Life ==
Hráský was born on 20 April 1857 in Babule, Galicia. He studied on a real school in Prague, then he studied civil engineering on the Czech Technical University in Prague (CTU) until 1878. In 1884–1897, he worked in Ljubljana, Slovenia. In 1900–1901 he was the rector of the CTU, then he was a dean of various fields. He left the university in 1922. In addition to his position at the university, he served as a member of the House of Deputies in Vienna from 1907 to 1918. He died on 12 April 1939 in Prague.

He was buried in his family tomb in Kluk (part of Poděbrady).

== Work ==
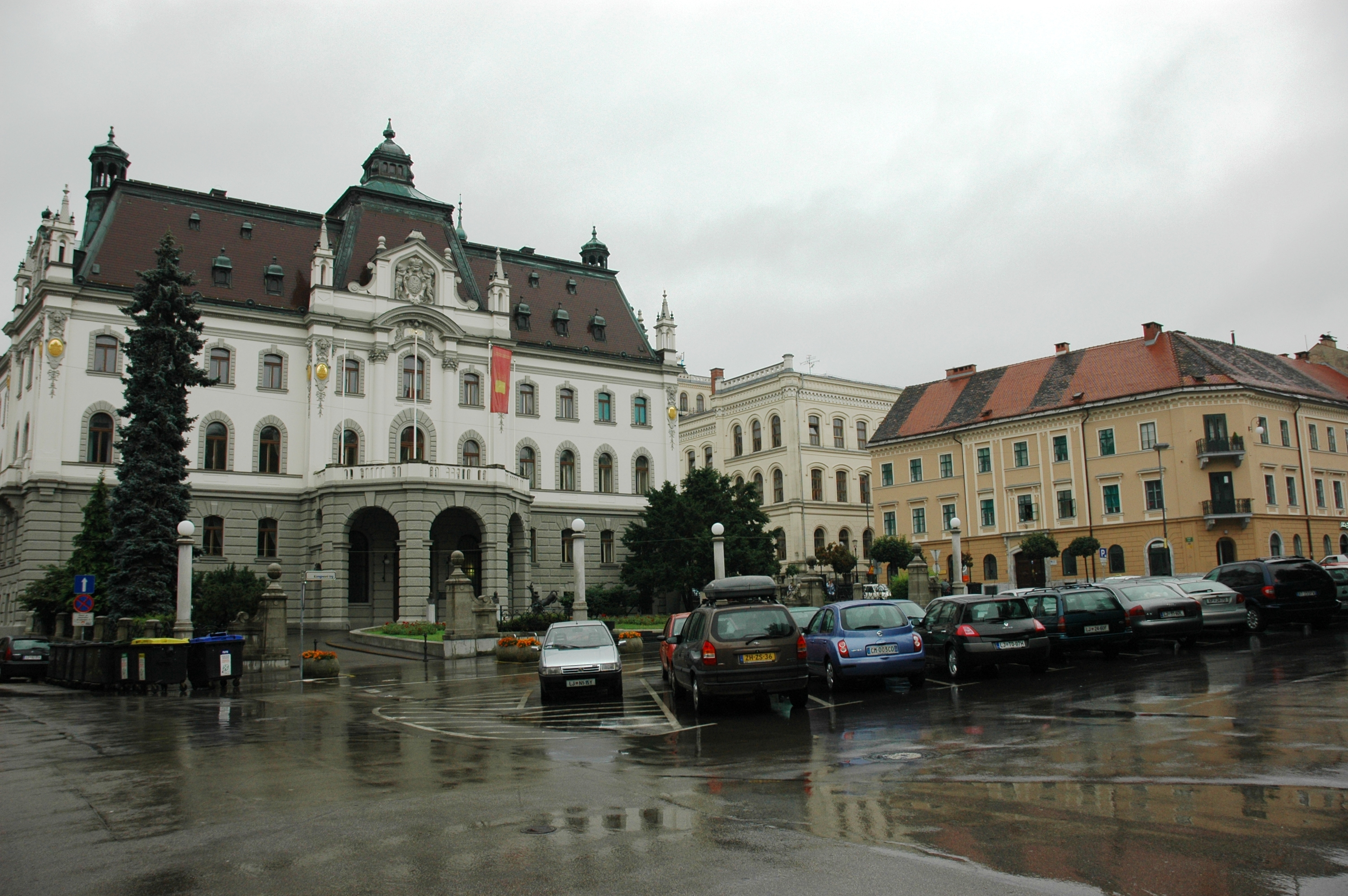
Carniolan Provincial Manor – University of Ljubljana, Ljubljana (1902)

Through his scientific, professional and publishing activities, he contributed to the development of water management in Bohemia/Czechoslovakia. He participated in the construction development of the spa town of Poděbrady.

Hráský is known in Slovenia as an original author of building in the Neo-Renaissance style of Carniolan Provincial Manor in Ljubljana (1899–1902), where from 1919 is a seat of the University of Ljubljana, and of the National Hall in Celje, where today is a seat of municipality (constructed in 1895–1896). In the 1890s, he had also designed the railway bridge in Radeče.

In 1892, the Provincial Theatre (Slovene: Deželno gledališče) in the Neo-Renaissance style was built in Ljubljana, today's Ljubljana Opera House, after his and Anton Hruby design. In 1898, he built plans for constructing of water supply tower in Kranj (constructed in 1909–1911).

== Honours ==
In 1912, he became an honorary citizen of Plzeň. In 1915, he became an honorary citizen of Poděbrady.

== Gallery ==
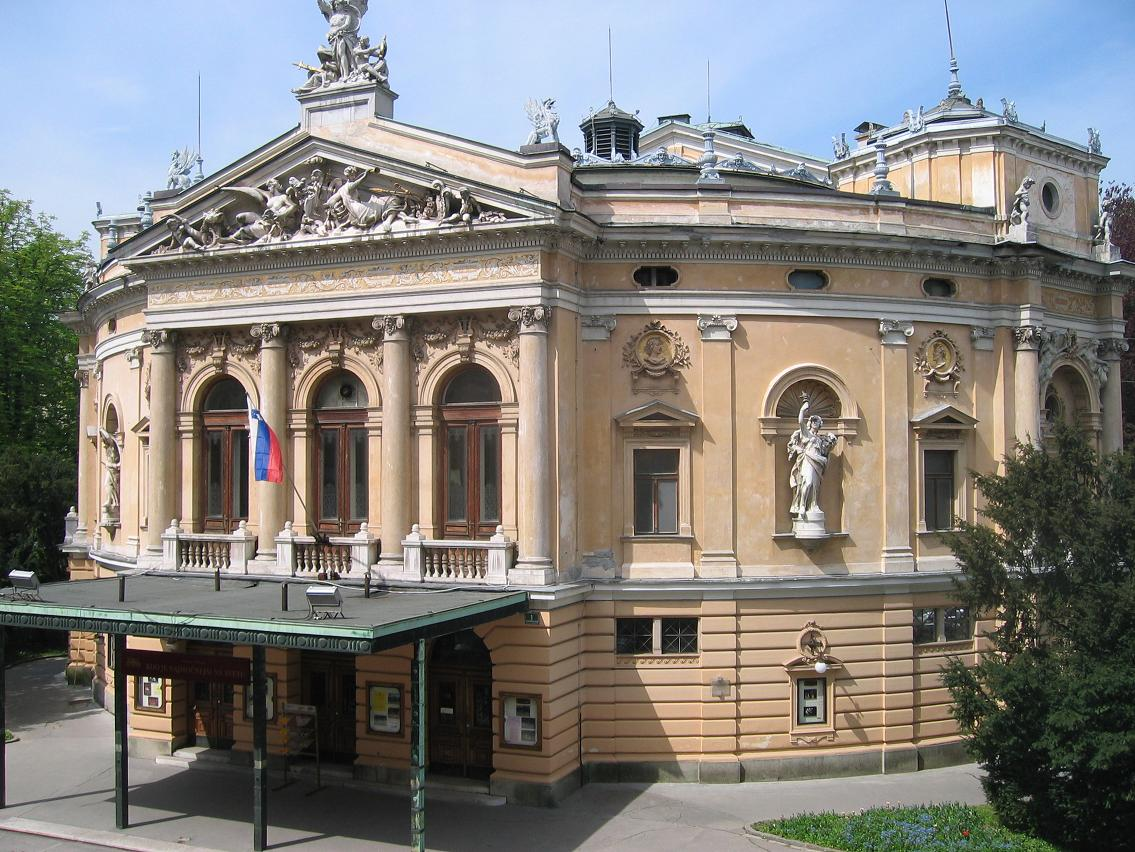
Ljubljana Opera House, Ljubljana (1892)

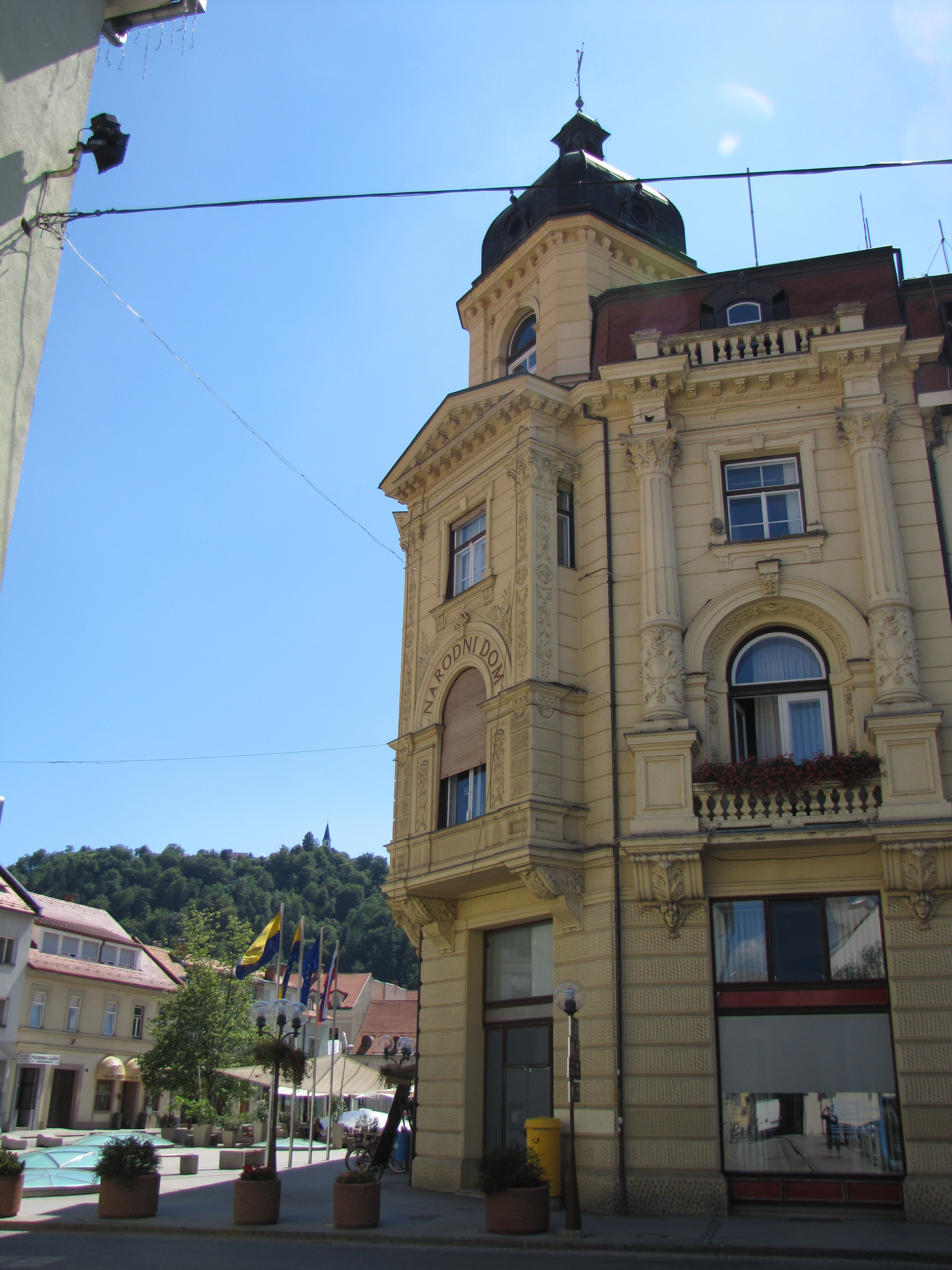
National Hall, Celje (1896)

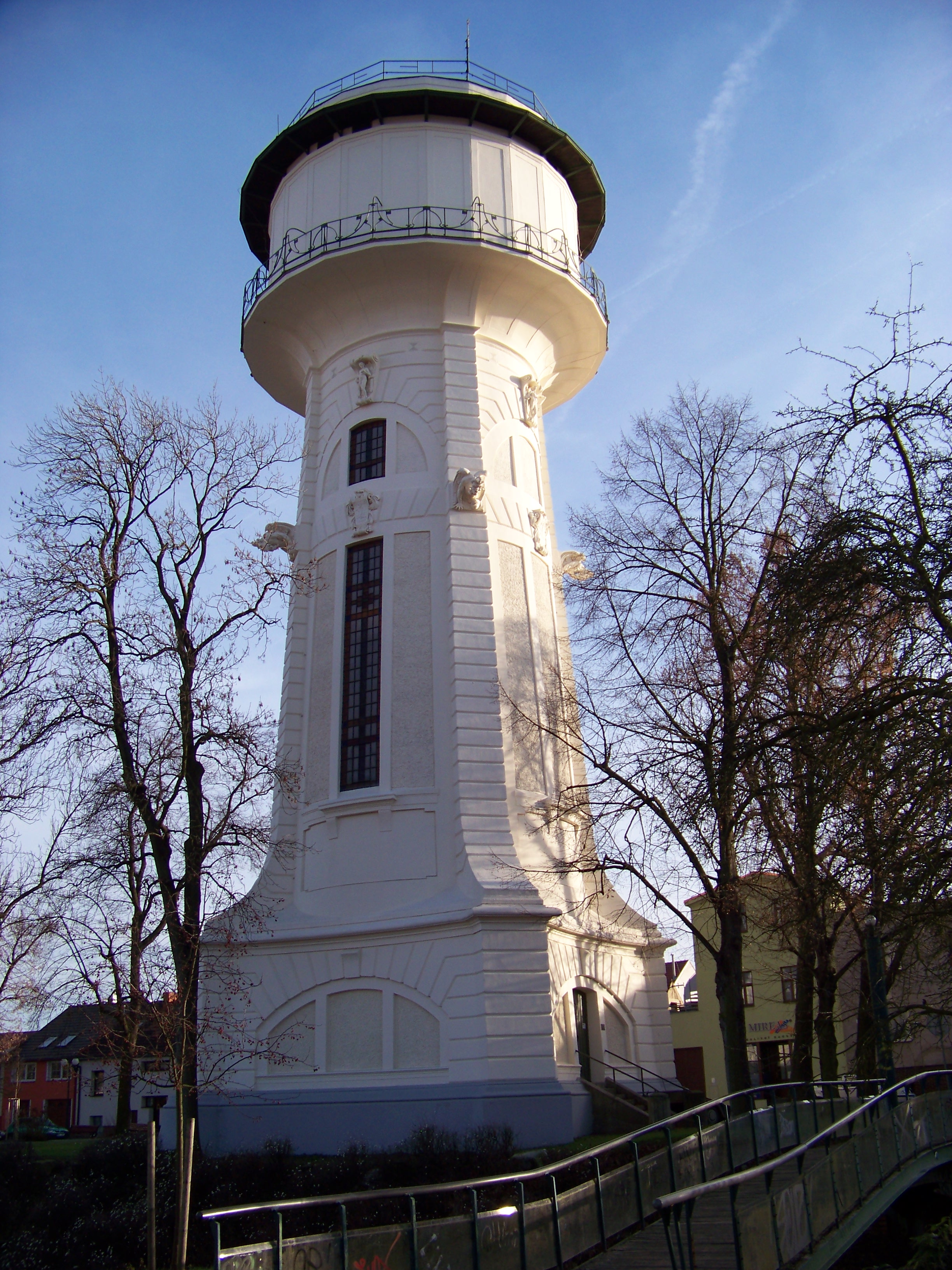
Water supply tower in Nymburk (1904)

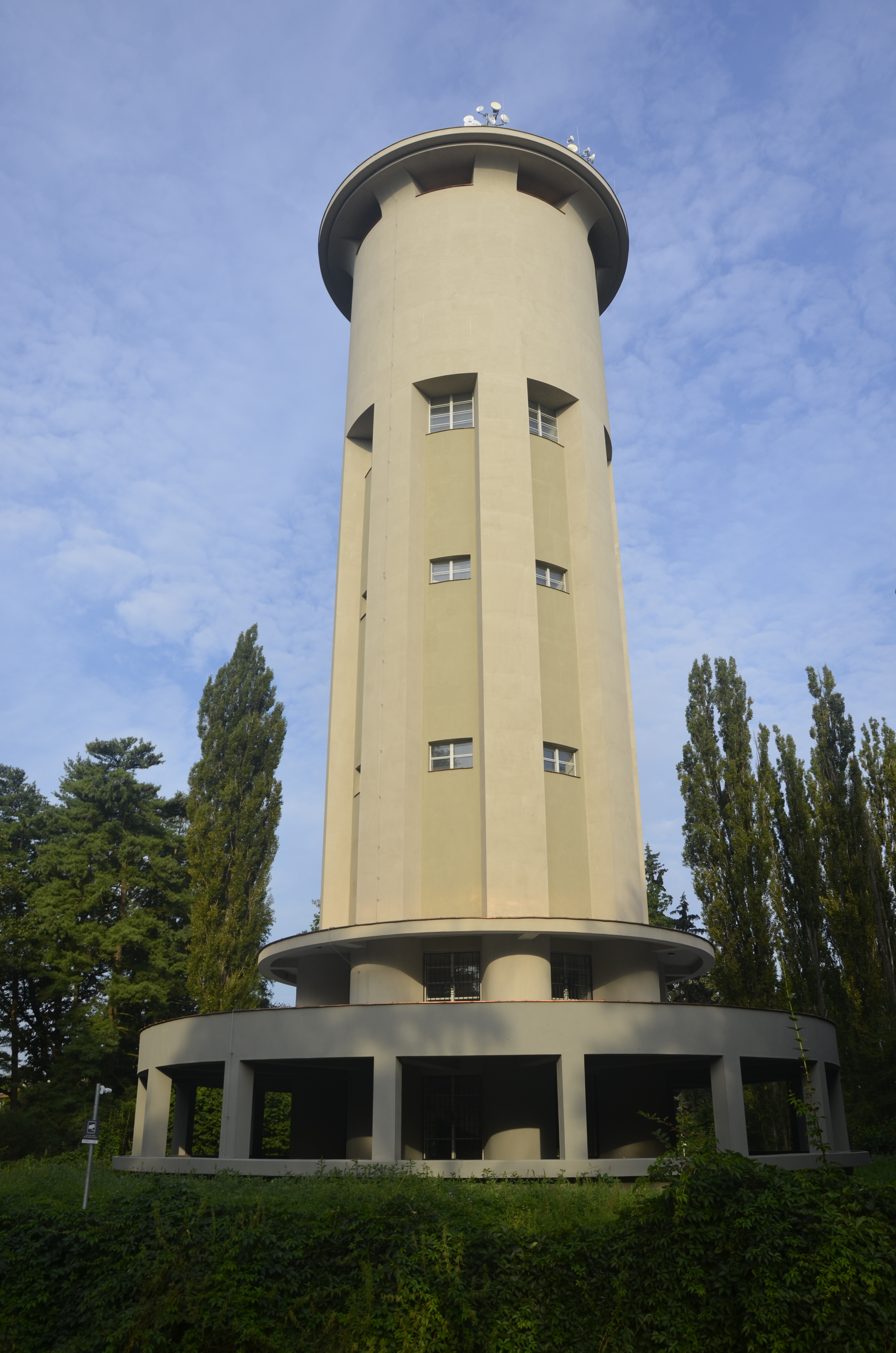
Water supply tower in Poděbrady (1930)
