= Rożniaty =

- Village
- Location within Poland
- Coordinates: 50°26′19″N 21°26′19″E
- Country: Poland
- Voivodeship: Subcarpathian
- County: Mielec
- Gmina: Padew Narodowa

Rożniaty [rɔʐˈɲatɨ] is a village in the administrative district of Gmina Padew Narodowa, within Mielec County, Subcarpathian Voivodeship, in south-eastern Poland.
