= Surowa, Podkarpackie Voivodeship =

Surowa
- Village
- Location within Poland
- Coordinates: 50°22′N 21°15′E
- Country: Poland
- Voivodeship: Subcarpathian
- County: Mielec
- Gmina: Borowa

Surowa [suˈrɔva] is a village in the administrative district of Gmina Borowa, within Mielec County, Subcarpathian Voivodeship, in south-eastern Poland.
