= Łysaków, Mielec County =

Łysaków
- Village
- Location within Poland
- Coordinates: 50°21′17″N 21°17′38″E
- Country: Poland
- Voivodeship: Subcarpathian
- County: Mielec
- Gmina: Czermin
- Time zone: UTC+1 (CET)
  - Summer (DST): UTC+2 (CEST)
- Vehicle registration: RMI

Łysaków [wɨˈsakuf] is a village in the administrative district of Gmina Czermin, within Mielec County, Subcarpathian Voivodeship, in south-eastern Poland.

Four Polish citizens were murdered by Nazi Germany in the village during World War II.
