= Rzędzianowice =

- Village
- Location within Poland
- Coordinates: 50°18′55″N 21°23′43″E
- Country: Poland
- Voivodeship: Subcarpathian
- County: Mielec
- Gmina: Mielec
- Population: 1,289

Rzędzianowice [ʐɛnd͡ʑanɔˈvit͡sɛ] is a village in the administrative district of Gmina Mielec, within Mielec County, Subcarpathian Voivodeship, in south-eastern Poland.
