= Przebendów =

- Village
- Location within Poland
- Coordinates: 50°16′50″N 21°12′22″E
- Country: Poland
- Voivodeship: Subcarpathian
- County: Mielec
- Gmina: Wadowice Górne
- Time zone: UTC+1 (CET)
  - Summer (DST): UTC+2 (CEST)

Przebendów [pʂɛˈbɛnduf] is a village in the administrative district of Gmina Wadowice Górne, within Mielec County, Subcarpathian Voivodeship, in south-eastern Poland.

Five Polish citizens were murdered by Nazi Germany in the village during World War II.
