= Kliszów =

Kliszów may refer to the following places in Poland:

- Kliszów, Lower Silesian Voivodeship (south-west Poland)
- Kliszów, Subcarpathian Voivodeship (south-east Poland)
- Kliszów, Świętokrzyskie Voivodeship (south-central Poland)
