= Ruda, Mielec County =

Ruda
- Village
- Location within Poland
- Coordinates: 50°12′04″N 21°20′55″E
- Country: Poland
- Voivodeship: Podkarpackie
- County: Mielec
- Gmina: Radomyśl Wielki
- Population: 1,600

Ruda [ˈruda] is a village in the administrative district of Gmina Radomyśl Wielki, within Mielec County, Podkarpackie Voivodeship, in south-eastern Poland.
