= Młodochów =

- Village
- Location within Poland
- Coordinates: 50°24′N 21°25′E
- Country: Poland
- Voivodeship: Subcarpathian
- County: Mielec
- Gmina: Gawłuszowice

Młodochów [mwɔˈdɔxuf] is a village in the administrative district of Gmina Gawłuszowice, within Mielec County, Subcarpathian Voivodeship, in south-eastern Poland.
