= Książnice, Podkarpackie Voivodeship =

Książnice
- Village
- Location within Poland
- Coordinates: 50°15′N 21°25′E
- Country: Poland
- Voivodeship: Subcarpathian
- County: Mielec
- Gmina: Mielec
- Population: 601

Książnice [kɕɔ̃ʐˈnit͡sɛ] is a village in the administrative district of Gmina Mielec, within Mielec County, Subcarpathian Voivodeship, in south-eastern Poland.
