= Złotniki, Podkarpackie Voivodeship =

Złotniki
- Village
- Location within Poland
- Coordinates: 50°19′16″N 21°24′41″E
- Country: Poland
- Voivodeship: Subcarpathian
- County: Mielec
- Gmina: Mielec
- Population: 1,111

Złotniki [zwɔtˈniki] is a village in the administrative district of Gmina Mielec, within Mielec County, Subcarpathian Voivodeship, in south-eastern Poland.
