= Dulcza Wielka =

- Village
- Location within Poland
- Coordinates: 50°11′28″N 21°12′44″E
- Country: Poland
- Voivodeship: Subcarpathian
- County: Mielec
- Gmina: Radomyśl Wielki

Dulcza Wielka [ˈdult͡ʂa ˈvjɛlka] is a village in the administrative district of Gmina Radomyśl Wielki, within Mielec County, Subcarpathian Voivodeship, in south-eastern Poland.
