= Zarównie =

- Village
- Location within Poland
- Coordinates: 50°25′N 21°32′E
- Country: Poland
- Voivodeship: Subcarpathian
- County: Mielec
- Gmina: Padew Narodowa

Zarównie [zaˈruvɲɛ] is a village in the administrative district of Gmina Padew Narodowa, within Mielec County, Subcarpathian Voivodeship, in south-eastern Poland.

The village consists of 115 houses, 1 small grocery shop and 1 Christian Church, the village measures 2 km (1 mi) long and 3.3 km (2 mi) wide with the area being 6.94 square kilometres
