= Wola Zdakowska =

- Village
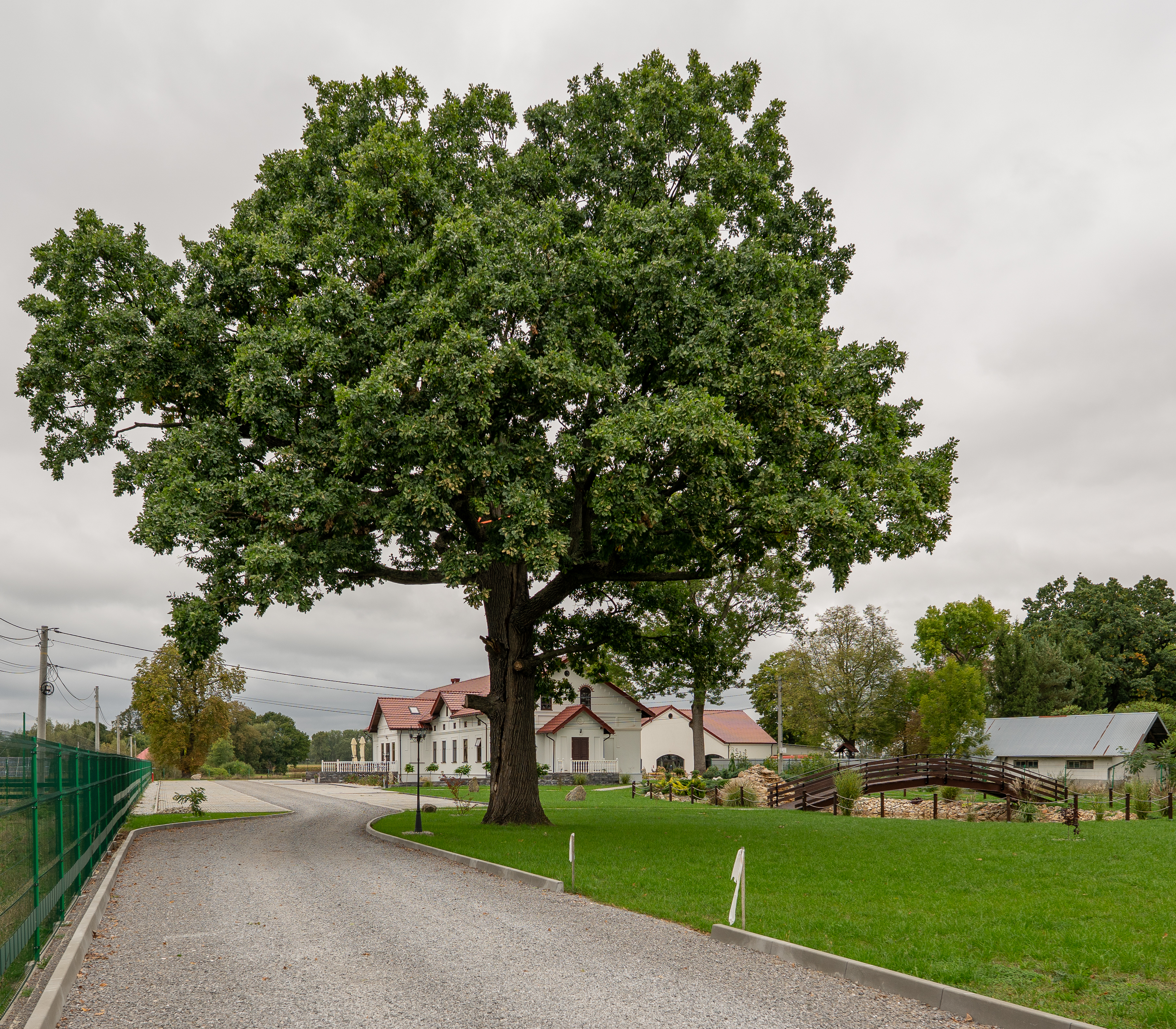

- Location within Poland
- Coordinates: 50°25′N 21°25′E
- Country: Poland
- Voivodeship: Subcarpathian
- County: Mielec
- Gmina: Gawłuszowice

Population (approx.)
  - Total: 600
- Time zone: UTC+1 (CET)
  - Summer (DST): UTC+2 (CEST)
- Vehicle registration: RMI

Wola Zdakowska [ˈvɔla zdaˈkɔfska] is a village in the administrative district of Gmina Gawłuszowice, within Mielec County, Subcarpathian Voivodeship, in south-eastern Poland.

Four Polish citizens were murdered by Nazi Germany in the village during World War II.
