= Sadkowa Góra =

- Village
- Location within Poland
- Coordinates: 50°23′N 21°19′E
- Country: Poland
- Voivodeship: Subcarpathian
- County: Mielec
- Gmina: Borowa
- Population (approx.): 890

Sadkowa Góra [satˈkɔva ˈɡura] is a village in the administrative district of Gmina Borowa, within Mielec County, Subcarpathian Voivodeship, in south-eastern Poland.
