= Kosówka, Podkarpackie Voivodeship =

Kosówka
- Village
- Location within Poland
- Coordinates: 50°16′57″N 21°12′22″E
- Country: Poland
- Voivodeship: Subcarpathian
- County: Mielec
- Gmina: Wadowice Górne

Kosówka [kɔˈsufka] is a village in the administrative district of Gmina Wadowice Górne, within Mielec County, Subcarpathian Voivodeship, in south-eastern Poland.
