= Wadowice Dolne =

- Village
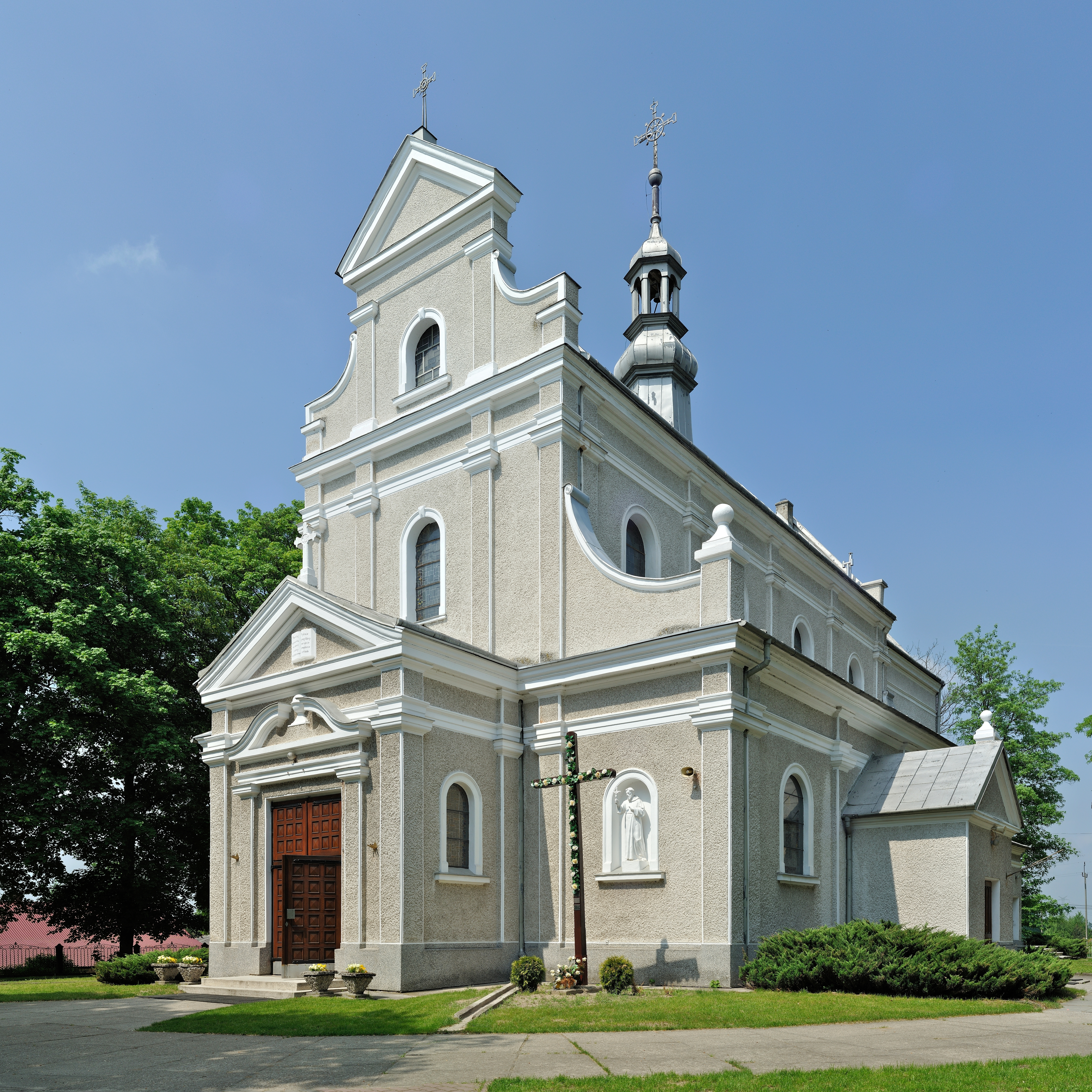
- Saint Francis of Assisi church

- Location within Poland
- Coordinates: 50°17′N 21°15′E
- Country: Poland
- Voivodeship: Subcarpathian
- County: Mielec
- Gmina: Wadowice Górne

Wadowice Dolne (Polish pronunciation: [vadɔˈvit͡sɛ ˈdɔlnɛ]) is a village in the administrative district of Gmina Wadowice Górne, within Mielec County, Subcarpathian Voivodeship, in south-eastern Poland.
