= Zachwiejów =

- Village
- Location within Poland
- Coordinates: 50°25′N 21°33′E
- Country: Poland
- Voivodeship: Subcarpathian
- County: Mielec
- Gmina: Padew Narodowa

Zachwiejów [zaxˈfjɛjuf] is a village in the administrative district of Gmina Padew Narodowa, within Mielec County, Subcarpathian Voivodeship, in south-eastern Poland.
