= Zabrnie, Podkarpackie Voivodeship =

Zabrnie
- Village
- Location within Poland
- Coordinates: 50°17′53″N 21°11′54″E
- Country: Poland
- Voivodeship: Subcarpathian
- County: Mielec
- Gmina: Wadowice Górne

Zabrnie [ˈzabrɲɛ] is a village in the administrative district of Gmina Wadowice Górne, within Mielec County, Subcarpathian Voivodeship, in south-eastern Poland.
