= Gliny Wielkie =

- Village
- Location within Poland
- Coordinates: 50°23′19″N 21°18′17″E
- Country: Poland
- Voivodeship: Subcarpathian
- County: Mielec
- Gmina: Borowa

Gliny Wielkie [ˈɡlinɨ ˈvjɛlkʲɛ] is a village in the administrative district of Gmina Borowa, within Mielec County, Subcarpathian Voivodeship, in south-eastern Poland.
