= Wojków, Podkarpackie Voivodeship =

Wojków
- Village
- Location within Poland
- Coordinates: 50°27′N 21°30′E
- Country: Poland
- Voivodeship: Subcarpathian
- County: Mielec
- Gmina: Padew Narodowa

Wojków [ˈvɔi̯kuf] is a village in the administrative district of Gmina Padew Narodowa, within Mielec County, Subcarpathian Voivodeship, in south-eastern Poland.
