= Ostrówek, Mielec County =

Ostrówek
- Village
- Location within Poland
- Coordinates: 50°25′N 21°21′E
- Country: Poland
- Voivodeship: Subcarpathian
- County: Mielec
- Gmina: Gawłuszowice
- Population: 200

Ostrówek [ɔsˈtruvɛk] is a village in the administrative district of Gmina Gawłuszowice, within Mielec County, Subcarpathian Voivodeship, in south-eastern Poland.
