= Szydłowiec, Podkarpackie Voivodeship =

Szydłowiec
- Village
- Location within Poland
- Coordinates: 50°18′N 21°33′E
- Country: Poland
- Voivodeship: Subcarpathian
- County: Mielec
- Gmina: Mielec
- Population: 129

Szydłowiec [ʂɨdˈwɔvjɛt͡s] is a village in the administrative district of Gmina Mielec, within Mielec County, Subcarpathian Voivodeship, in south-eastern Poland.
