= Domacyny =

- Village
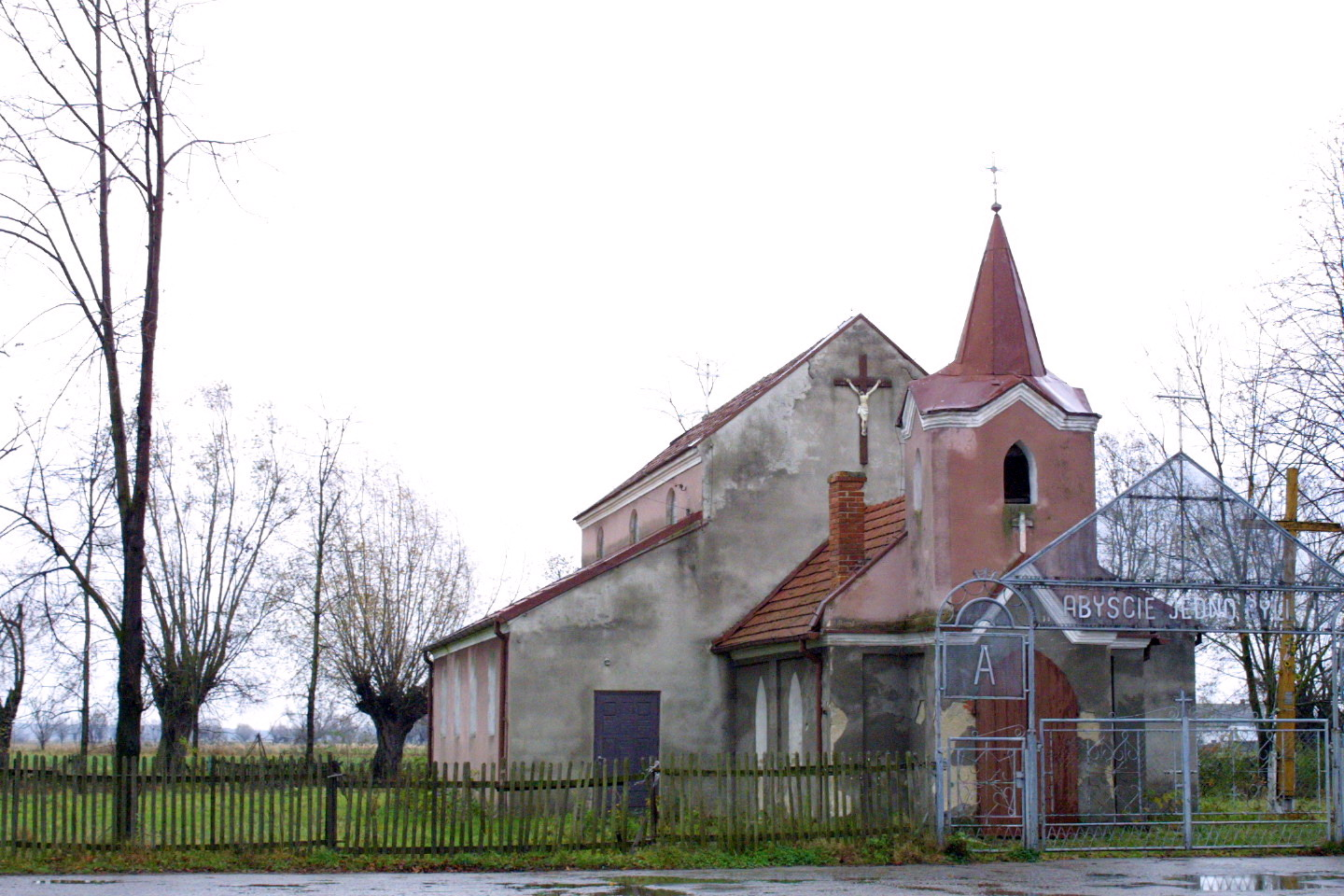
- 19th-century church in Domacyny

- Location within Poland
- Coordinates: 50°28′N 21°29′E
- Country: Poland
- Voivodeship: Subcarpathian
- County: Mielec
- Gmina: Padew Narodowa

Domacyny [dɔmaˈt͡sɨnɨ] is a village in the administrative district of Gmina Padew Narodowa, within Mielec County, Subcarpathian Voivodeship, in south-eastern Poland.
