= Boża Wola, Podkarpackie Voivodeship =

Boża Wola
- Village
- Location within Poland
- Coordinates: 50°15′N 21°26′E
- Country: Poland
- Voivodeship: Subcarpathian
- County: Mielec
- Gmina: Mielec
- Population: 129

Boża Wola [ˈbɔʐa ˈvɔla] is a village in the administrative district of Gmina Mielec, within Mielec County, Subcarpathian Voivodeship, in south-eastern Poland.
