= Granica, Podkarpackie Voivodeship =

Granica
- Settlement
- Location within Poland
- Coordinates: 50°15′28″N 21°14′29″E
- Country: Poland
- Voivodeship: Subcarpathian
- County: Mielec
- Gmina: Wadowice Górne

Granica [ɡraˈnit͡sa] is a settlement in the administrative district of Gmina Wadowice Górne, within Mielec County, Subcarpathian Voivodeship, in south-eastern Poland.
