= Żarówka =

- Village
- Location within Poland
- Coordinates: 50°10′N 21°14′E
- Country: Poland
- Voivodeship: Subcarpathian
- County: Mielec
- Gmina: Radomyśl Wielki
- Population: 900

Żarówka [ʐaˈrufka] is a village in the administrative district of Gmina Radomyśl Wielki, within Mielec County, Subcarpathian Voivodeship, in south-eastern Poland.
