= Breń =

Breń may refer to the following places in Poland:

- Breń, Lesser Poland Voivodeship
- Breń, West Pomeranian Voivodeship

== See also ==
- Breń Osuchowski
