= Wierzchowiny, Podkarpackie Voivodeship =

Wierzchowiny
- Village
- Location within Poland
- Coordinates: 50°16′01″N 21°13′51″E
- Country: Poland
- Voivodeship: Podkarpackie
- County: Mielec
- Gmina: Wadowice Górne

Wierzchowiny [vjɛʂxɔˈvinɨ] is a village in the administrative district of Gmina Wadowice Górne, within Mielec County, Podkarpackie Voivodeship, in south-eastern Poland.
