= Dąbrówka Wisłocka =

- Village
- Location within Poland
- Coordinates: 50°10′N 21°20′E
- Country: Poland
- Voivodeship: Subcarpathian
- County: Mielec
- Gmina: Radomyśl Wielki
- Population: 750

Dąbrówka Wisłocka [dɔmˈbrufka viˈswɔt͡ska] is a village in the administrative district of Gmina Radomyśl Wielki, within Mielec County, Subcarpathian Voivodeship, in south-eastern Poland.
