= Ljubljana Opera House =

Theatre in Ljubljana, Slovenia

Coordinates: 46°3′9.48″N 14°30′3.01″E

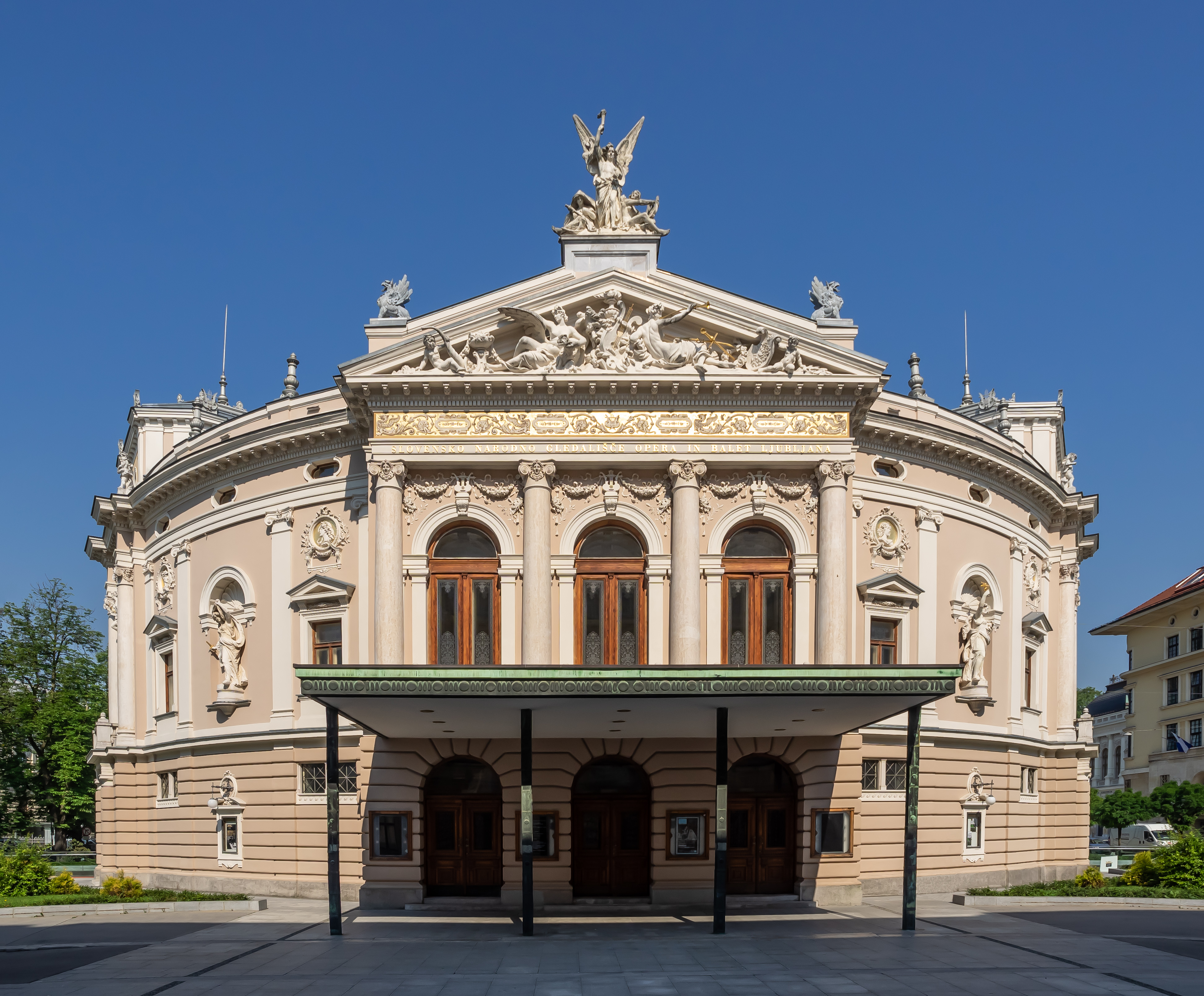
Ljubljana Opera House before a major restoration in 2011

The Ljubljana Opera House (Slovene: Opera, or ljubljanska operna hiša) is an opera house in Ljubljana, the capital of Slovenia. The seat of the national opera and ballet company, the Ljubljana Slovene National Theatre Opera and Ballet, it serves as the national opera building of the country. It stands at 1 Župančič Street (Župančičeva 1) between the Slovenian Parliament building, on one hand, and the National Museum and the National Gallery, on the other hand.

== History ==
The building was originally named the Provincial Theatre (Slovene: Deželno gledališče) and was built between 1890 and 1892 in the Neo-Renaissance style by the Czech architects Jan Vladimír Hráský and Anton Hruby. Before the construction of the German Theatre (the present Ljubljana National Drama Theatre (SNG) at 1 Erjavec Street) in 1911, the building served as a venue for productions in both Slovene and German, and afterwards only in Slovene.

== Architecture ==
The facade of the Opera House has Ionic columns supporting a pediment with a tympanum above the entrance and has two niches at the side adorned with allegorical statues of Tragedy and Comedy by the sculptor Alojz Gangl (1859–1935).

== Gallery ==
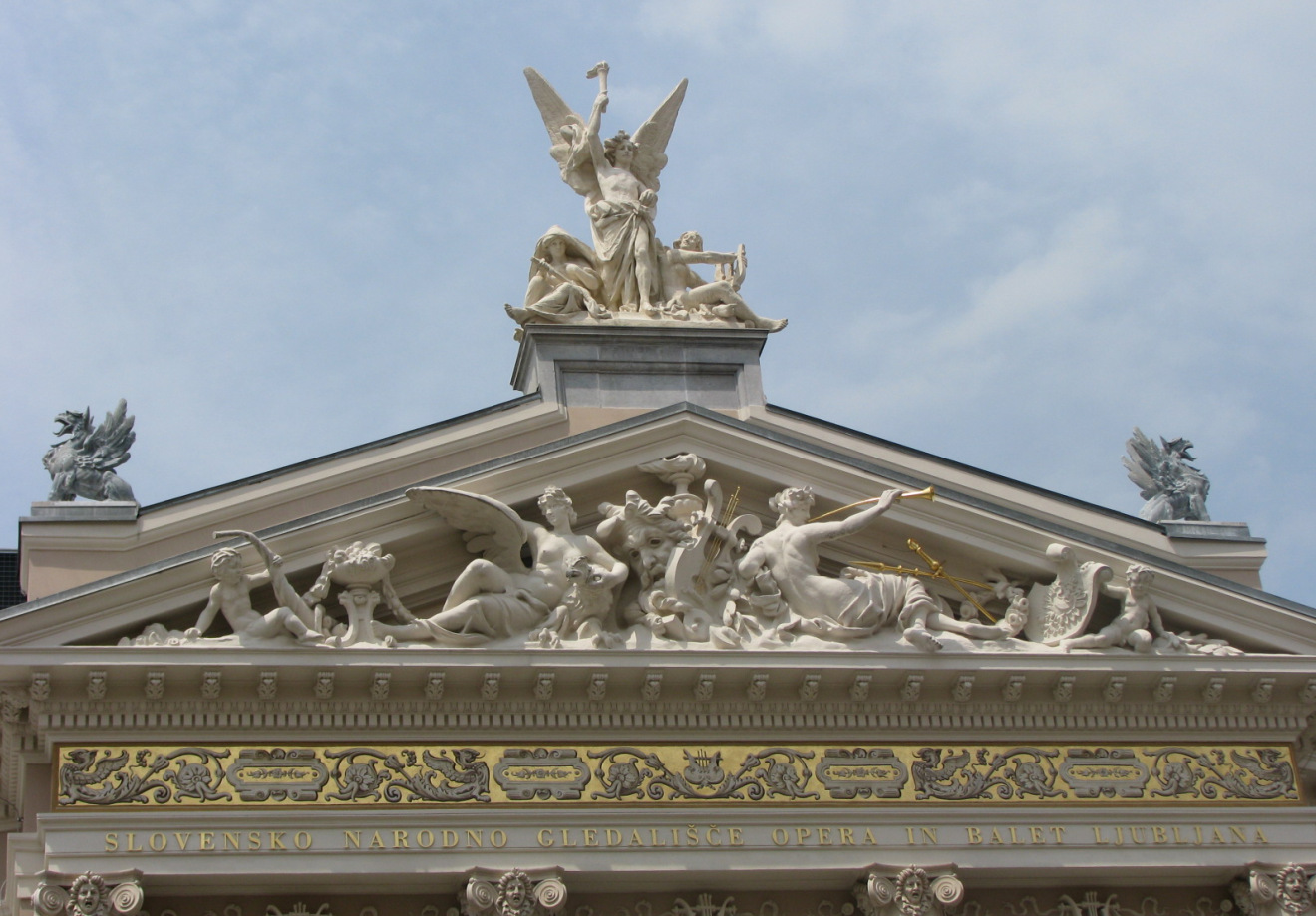
The Genius with the torch and other statues above the main entrance

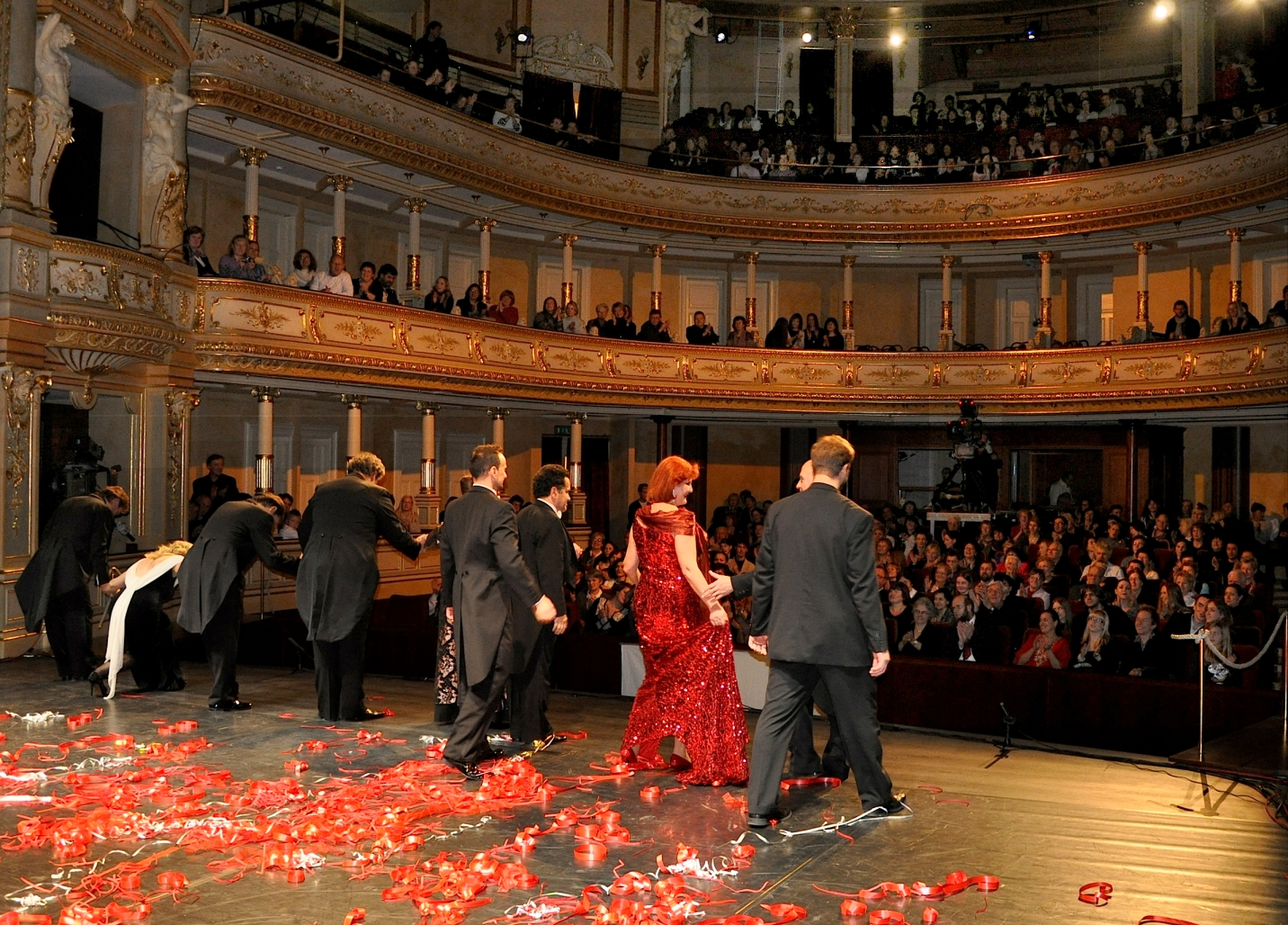
The interior after a major restoration in 2011

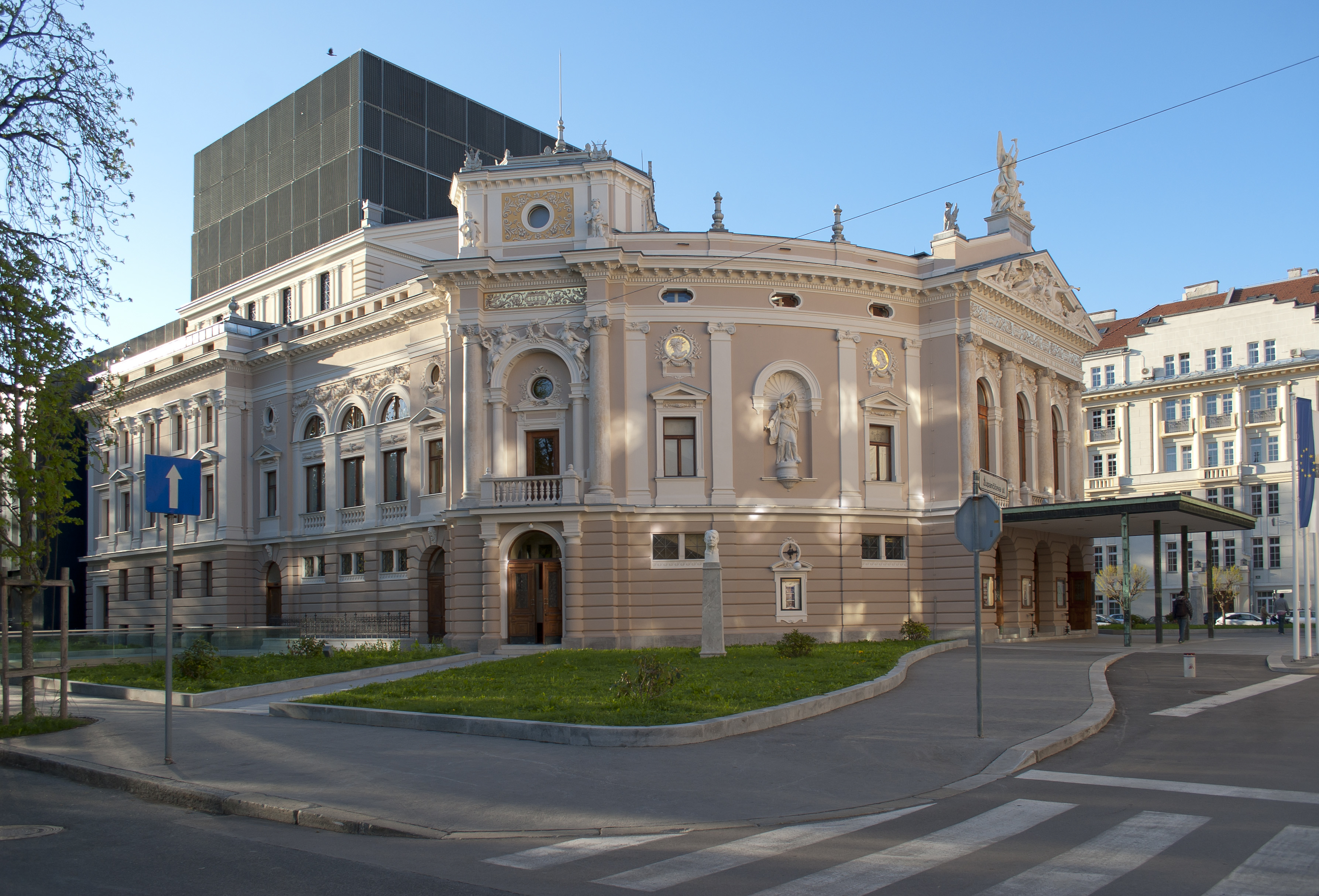
Ljubljana Opera House after a major restoration in 2011. The expansion is visible in the back.
