= Padew Narodowa =

- Village
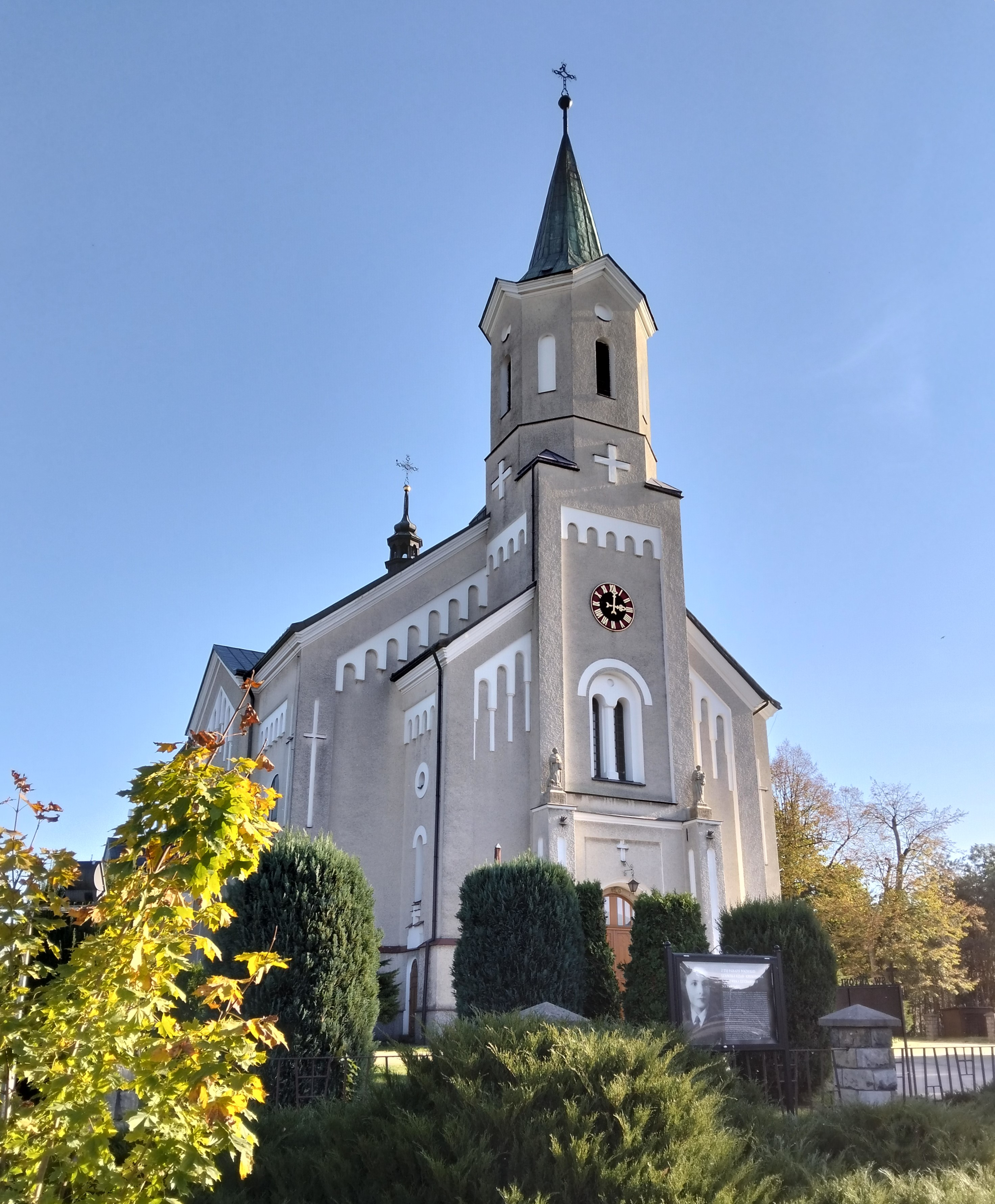
- Church of Saint Anthony of Padua

- Location within Poland
- Coordinates: 50°26′N 21°30′E
- Country: Poland
- Voivodeship: Subcarpathian
- County: Mielec
- Gmina: Padew Narodowa

Population
  - Total: 2,300
- Website: http://www.padewnarodowa.pl/

Padew Narodowa [ˈpadɛf narɔˈdɔva] is a village in Mielec County, Subcarpathian Voivodeship, in south-eastern Poland. It is the seat of the gmina (administrative district) called Gmina Padew Narodowa.
