= Borowa, Mielec County =

Borowa
- Village
- Location within Poland
- Coordinates: 50°23′11″N 21°21′21″E
- Country: Poland
- Voivodeship: Subcarpathian
- County: Mielec
- Gmina: Borowa
- Population: 1,451

Borowa [bɔˈrɔva] is a village in Mielec County, Subcarpathian Voivodeship, in south-eastern Poland. It is the seat of the gmina (administrative district) called Gmina Borowa.
