= Piechota =

Piechota is a Polish-language surname. Two possible etymologies are suggested. One is the actual noun piechota in its various historical meanings. Another is a derivative of the diminutive form "Piech" from given names Pietr, Piotr, etc.

Notable people with the surname include:

- Al Piechota (1914–1996), American baseball player
- Jacek Piechota (born 1959), Polish politician
- Oskar Piechota (born 1990), Polish mixed martial artist
- Paulina Piechota (born 1999), Polish swimmer
- Sławomir Jan Piechota (born 1960), Polish politician

== See also ==
- Piechocki
