= Gmina Padew Narodowa =

Gmina Padew Narodowa Padew Narodowa Commune
- Gmina
- Coat of arms
- Interactive map of Gmina Padew Narodowa
- Coordinates (Padew Narodowa): 50°26′N 21°30′E
- Country: Poland
- Voivodeship: Subcarpathian
- County: Mielec
- Seat: Padew Narodowa

Area
  - Total: 70.55 km^{2} (27.24 sq mi)

Population (2006)
  - Total: 5,352
  - Density: 75.86/km^{2} (196.5/sq mi)
- Website: http://padewnarodowa.com.pl/

Gmina Padew Narodowa is a rural gmina (administrative district) in Mielec County, Subcarpathian Voivodeship, in south-eastern Poland.

== Overview ==
Its seat is the village of Padew Narodowa, which lies approximately 18 kilometres (11 mi) north of Mielec and 58 km (36 mi) north-west of the regional capital Rzeszów. The gmina covers an area of 70.55 square kilometres (27.2 sq mi), and as of 2006 its total population is 5,352.

== Neighbouring districts ==
Gmina Padew Narodowa is bordered by the gminas of Baranów Sandomierski, Gawłuszowice, Osiek and Tuszów Narodowy.

== Villages ==
- Babule
- Domacyny
- Kębłów
- Padew Narodowa
- Piechoty
- Pierzchne
- Przykop
- Rożniaty
- Wojków
- Zachwiejów
- Zaduszniki
- Zarównie
