= Kliszów, Podkarpackie Voivodeship =

Kliszów
- Village
- Location within Poland
- Coordinates: 50°23′18″N 21°23′18″E
- Country: Poland
- Voivodeship: Subcarpathian
- County: Mielec
- Gmina: Gawłuszowice
- Population (approx.): 880

Kliszów [ˈkliʂuf] is a village in the administrative district of Gmina Gawłuszowice, within Mielec County, Subcarpathian Voivodeship, in south-eastern Poland.
