= Gawłuszowice =

- Village
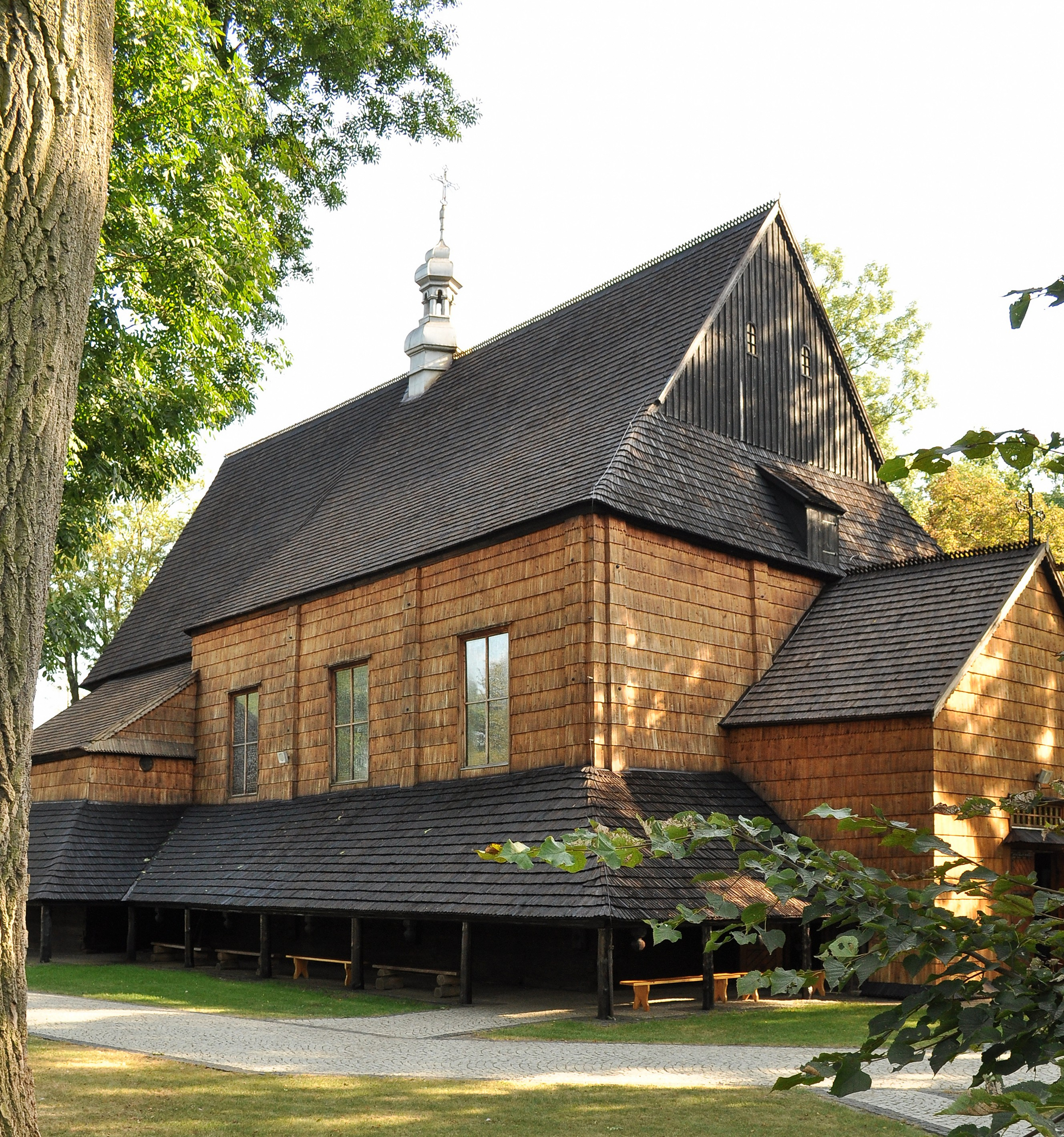
- St. Adalbert's Church from 1677

- Location within Poland
- Coordinates: 50°25′N 21°23′E
- Country: Poland
- Voivodeship: Subcarpathian
- County: Mielec
- Gmina: Gawłuszowice
- Population (approx.): 700
- Website: http://www.gawluszowice.pl/

Gawłuszowice [ɡavwuʂɔˈvit͡sɛ] is a village in Mielec County, Subcarpathian Voivodeship, in south-eastern Poland. It is the seat of the gmina (administrative district) called Gmina Gawłuszowice.

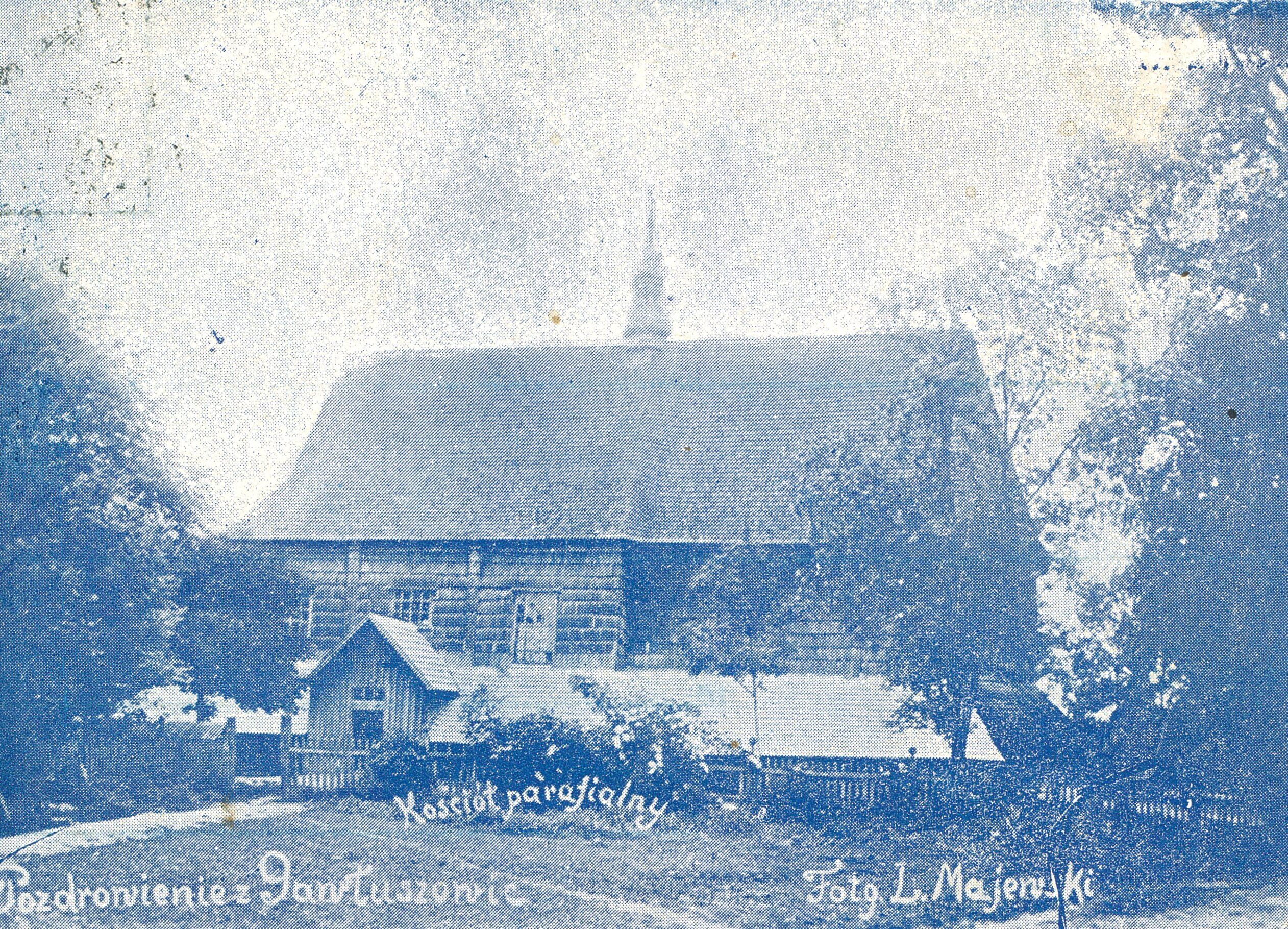
View of the church before 1904
