= Gmina Borowa =

Gmina Borowa Borowa Commune
- Gmina
- Coat of arms
- Interactive map of Gmina Borowa
- Coordinates (Borowa): 50°23′11″N 21°21′21″E
- Country: Poland
- Voivodeship: Subcarpathian
- County: Mielec
- Seat: Borowa

Area
  - Total: 55.47 km^{2} (21.42 sq mi)

Population (2006)
  - Total: 5,588
  - Density: 100.7/km^{2} (260.9/sq mi)
- Website: http://www.borowa.pl

Gmina Borowa is a rural gmina (administrative district) in Mielec County, Subcarpathian Voivodeship, in south-eastern Poland. Its seat is the village of Borowa, which lies approximately 13 kilometres (8 mi) north-west of Mielec and 61 km (38 mi) north-west of the regional capital Rzeszów.

The gmina covers an area of 55.47 square kilometres (21.4 sq mi), and as of 2006 its total population is 5,588.

== Villages ==
Gmina Borowa contains the villages and settlements of Borowa, Gliny Małe, Gliny Wielkie, Górki, Łysakówek, Orłów, Pławo, Sadkowa Góra, Surowa and Wola Pławska.

== Neighbouring gminas ==
Gmina Borowa is bordered by the gminas of Czermin, Gawłuszowice, Mielec and Połaniec.
