= Gmina Mielec =

Gmina Mielec Mielec Commune
- Gmina
- Coat of arms
- Interactive map of Gmina Mielec
- Coordinates (Mielec): 50°17′N 21°26′E
- Country: Poland
- Voivodeship: Subcarpathian
- County: Mielec
- Seat: Mielec

Area
  - Total: 122.12 km^{2} (47.15 sq mi)

Population (2006)
  - Total: 12,112
  - Density: 99.181/km^{2} (256.88/sq mi)
- Website: http://www.gmina.mielec.pl/

Gmina Mielec is a rural gmina (administrative district) in Mielec County, Subcarpathian Voivodeship, in south-eastern Poland. Its seat is the town of Mielec, although the town is not part of the territory of the gmina.

The gmina covers an area of 122.12 square kilometres (47.2 sq mi), and as of 2006 its total population is 12,112.

== Villages ==
Gmina Mielec contains the villages and settlements of Boża Wola, Chorzelów, Chrząstów, Goleszów, Książnice, Podleszany, Rydzów, Rzędzianowice, Szydłowiec, Trześń, Wola Chorzelowska, Wola Mielecka and Złotniki.

== Neighbouring gminas ==
Gmina Mielec is bordered by the town of Mielec and by the gminas of Borowa, Cmolas, Czermin, Gawłuszowice, Niwiska, Przecław, Radomyśl Wielki, Tuszów Narodowy and Wadowice Górne.
