= Gmina Gawłuszowice =

Gmina Gawłuszowice Gawłuszowice Commune
- Gmina
- Interactive map of Gmina Gawłuszowice
- Coordinates (Gawłuszowice): 50°25′N 21°23′E
- Country: Poland
- Voivodeship: Subcarpathian
- County: Mielec
- Seat: Gawłuszowice

Area
  - Total: 33.79 km^{2} (13.05 sq mi)

Population (2006)
  - Total: 2,856
  - Density: 84.52/km^{2} (218.9/sq mi)
- Website: http://www.gawluszowice.pl

Gmina Gawłuszowice is a rural gmina (administrative district) in Mielec County, Subcarpathian Voivodeship, in south-eastern Poland. Its seat is the village of Gawłuszowice, which lies approximately 16 kilometres (10 mi) north of Mielec and 62 km (39 mi) north-west of the regional capital Rzeszów.

The gmina covers an area of 33.79 square kilometres (13.0 sq mi), and as of 2006 its total population is 2,856.

== Villages ==
Gmina Gawłuszowice contains the villages and settlements of Brzyście, Gawłuszowice, Kliszów, Krzemienica, Młodochów, Ostrówek and Wola Zdakowska.

== Neighbouring gminas ==
Gmina Gawłuszowice is bordered by the gminas of Borowa, Mielec, Osiek, Padew Narodowa, Połaniec and Tuszów Narodowy.
