= Gmina Radomyśl Wielki =

Gmina Radomyśl Wielki Radomyśl Wielki Commune
- Gmina
- Coat of arms
- Interactive map of Gmina Radomyśl Wielki
- Coordinates (Radomyśl Wielki): 50°11′41″N 21°16′24″E
- Country: Poland
- Voivodeship: Subcarpathian
- County: Mielec
- Seat: Radomyśl Wielki

Area
  - Total: 159.64 km^{2} (61.64 sq mi)

Population (2006)
  - Total: 13,641
  - Density: 85.449/km^{2} (221.31/sq mi)
  - Urban: 2,912
  - Rural: 10,729
- Website: https://www.radomyslwielki.pl/

Gmina Radomyśl Wielki is an urban-rural gmina (administrative district) in Mielec County, Subcarpathian Voivodeship, in south-eastern Poland. Its seat is the town of Radomyśl Wielki, which lies approximately 16 kilometres (10 mi) south-west of Mielec and 56 km (35 mi) west of the regional capital Rzeszów.

The gmina covers an area of 159.64 square kilometres (61.6 sq mi), and as of 2006 its total population is 13,641 (out of which the population of Radomyśl Wielki amounts to 2,912, and the population of the rural part of the gmina is 10,729).

== Villages ==
Apart from the town of Radomyśl Wielki, Gmina Radomyśl Wielki contains the villages and settlements of Dąbie, Dąbrówka Wisłocka, Dulcza Mała, Dulcza Wielka, Janowiec, Partynia, Pień, Podborze, Ruda, Żarówka, Zdziarzec and Zgórsko.

== Neighbouring gminas ==
Gmina Radomyśl Wielki is bordered by the gminas of Czarna, Mielec, Przecław, Radgoszcz, Wadowice Górne and Żyraków.
