= Pień, Podkarpackie Voivodeship =

Pień
- Village
- Location within Poland
- Coordinates: 50°13′26″N 21°15′27″E
- Country: Poland
- Voivodeship: Subcarpathian
- County: Mielec
- Gmina: Radomyśl Wielki

Pień [pjɛɲ] is a village in the administrative district of Gmina Radomyśl Wielki, within Mielec County, Subcarpathian Voivodeship, in south-eastern Poland.
