= Celje National Hall =

City hall in Celje, Slovenia

Coordinates: 46°13′46.45″N 15°15′41.23″E

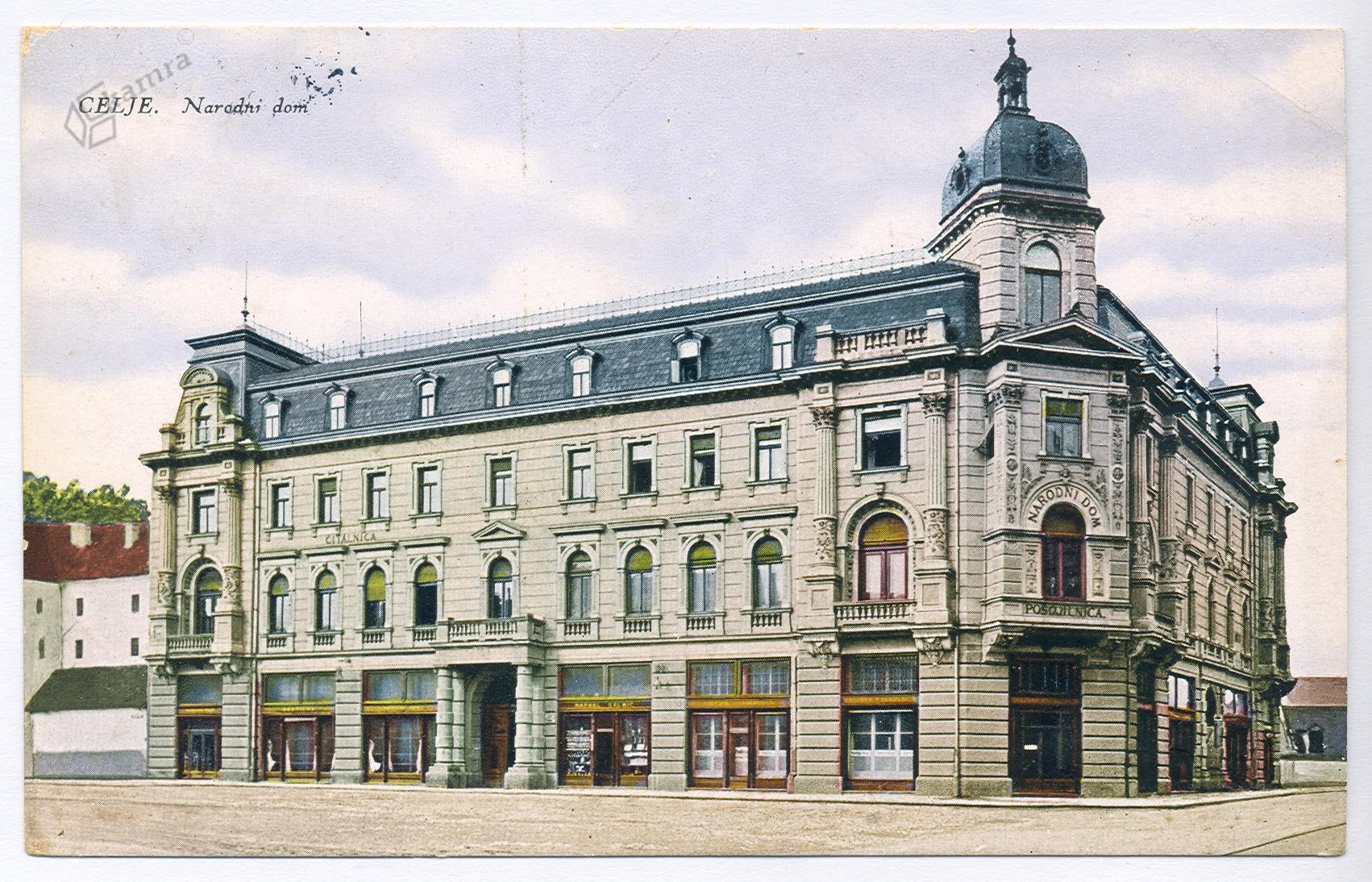
1906 postcard of Celje National Hall

Celje National Hall (Slovene: Narodni dom) is a city hall in Celje, a town in central-eastern Slovenia. It was built between 1895 and 1896 and today hosts the seat of a township. It was designed by the Czech architects Jan Vladimír Hráský and Jan Vejrych and was a multimodal building. Such national halls were generally used in the Slovene Lands of the period.
