= Czermin, Podkarpackie Voivodeship =

Czermin
- Village
- Location within Poland
- Coordinates: 50°20′N 21°20′E
- Country: Poland
- Voivodeship: Subcarpathian
- County: Mielec
- Gmina: Czermin
- Population: 1,557

Czermin [ˈt͡ʂɛrmin] is a village in Mielec County, Subcarpathian Voivodeship, in south-eastern Poland. It is the seat of the gmina (administrative district) called Gmina Czermin.

The village was first mentioned in 1190. After the First Partition of Poland in a part of the village, in the course of Josephine colonization, ethnic Germans, dominationally mixed (Roman Catholic, Lutheran and Calvinist) settled here in 1783.
