= Gmina Wadowice Górne =

Gmina Wadowice Górne Wadowice Górne Commune
- Gmina
- Interactive map of Gmina Wadowice Górne
- Coordinates (Wadowice Górne): 50°16′N 21°17′E
- Country: Poland
- Voivodeship: Subcarpathian
- County: Mielec
- Seat: Wadowice Górne

Area
  - Total: 87.16 km^{2} (33.65 sq mi)

Population (2006)
  - Total: 7,269
  - Density: 83.40/km^{2} (216.0/sq mi)
- Website: http://www.wadowicegorne.pl

Gmina Wadowice Górne is a rural gmina (administrative district) in Mielec County, Subcarpathian Voivodeship, in south-eastern Poland. Its seat is the village of Wadowice Górne, which lies approximately 11 kilometres (7 mi) west of Mielec and 58 km (36 mi) north-west of the regional capital Rzeszów.

The gmina covers an area of 87.16 square kilometres (33.7 sq mi), and as of 2006 its total population was 7,269.

== Villages ==
Gmina Wadowice Górne contains the villages and settlements of Borowina, Granica, Grzybów, Izbiska, Jamy, Kawęczyn, Koniec, Kosówka, Piątkowiec, Podlesie, Przebendów, Wadowice Dolne, Wadowice Górne, Wampierzów, Wierzchowiny, Wola Wadowska and Zabrnie.

== Neighbouring gminas ==
Gmina Wadowice Górne is bordered by the gminas of Czermin, Mielec, Radgoszcz, Radomyśl Wielki and Szczucin.
