= Babule =

- Village
- Location within Poland
- Coordinates: 50°24′N 21°32′E
- Country: Poland
- Voivodeship: Subcarpathian
- County: Mielec
- Gmina: Padew Narodowa

Population
  - Total: 260
- Time zone: UTC+1 (CET)
  - Summer (DST): UTC+2 (CEST)
- Vehicle registration: RMI
- Website: www.babule.republika.pl

Babule [baˈbulɛ] is a village in the administrative district of Gmina Padew Narodowa, within Mielec County, Subcarpathian Voivodeship, in south-eastern Poland.

Four Polish citizens were murdered by Nazi Germany in the village during World War II.
