= Breń Osuchowski =

- Village
- Location within Poland
- Coordinates: 50°19′N 21°16′E
- Country: Poland
- Voivodeship: Subcarpathian
- County: Mielec
- Gmina: Czermin
- Time zone: UTC+1 (CET)
  - Summer (DST): UTC+2 (CEST)
- Vehicle registration: RMI

Breń Osuchowski [ˈbrɛɲ ɔsuˈxɔfski] is a village in the administrative district of Gmina Czermin, within Mielec County, Subcarpathian Voivodeship, in south-eastern Poland.

Four Polish citizens were murdered by Nazi Germany in the village during World War II.
