= Wadowice Górne =

- Village
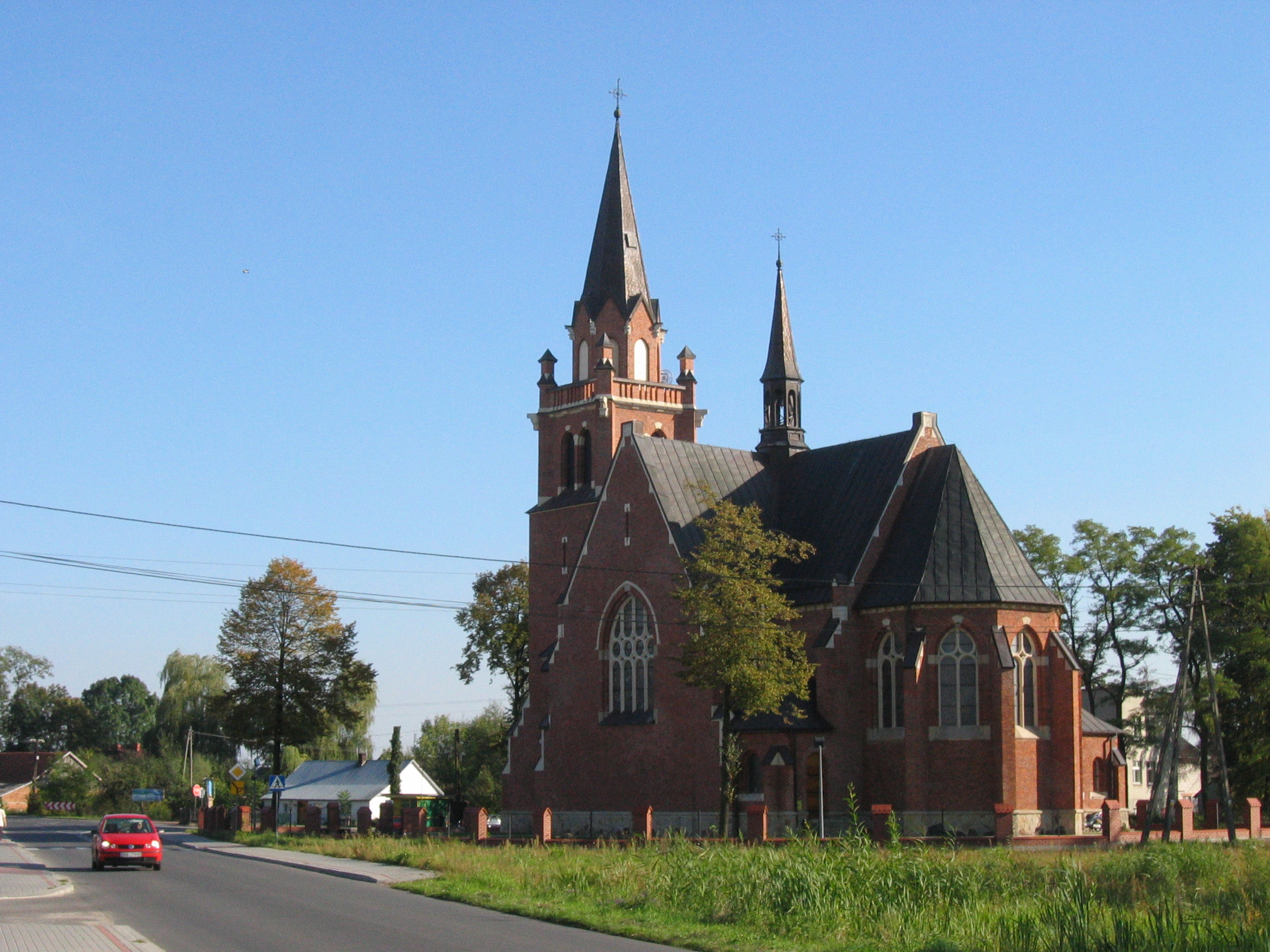
- Saint Anne church

- Location within Poland
- Coordinates: 50°16′N 21°17′E
- Country: Poland
- Voivodeship: Subcarpathian
- County: Mielec
- Gmina: Wadowice Górne

Wadowice Górne (Polish pronunciation: [vadɔˈvit͡sɛ ˈɡurnɛ]) is a village in Mielec County, Subcarpathian Voivodeship, in south-eastern Poland. It is the seat of the gmina (administrative district) called Gmina Wadowice Górne.
