= Gmina Czermin, Podkarpackie Voivodeship =

Gmina Czermin Czermin Commune
- Gmina
- Coat of arms
- Interactive map of Gmina Czermin
- Coordinates (Czermin): 50°20′N 21°20′E
- Country: Poland
- Voivodeship: Subcarpathian
- County: Mielec
- Seat: Czermin

Area
  - Total: 80.32 km^{2} (31.01 sq mi)

Population (2006)
  - Total: 6,721
  - Density: 83.68/km^{2} (216.7/sq mi)
- Website: http://www.czermin.pl

Gmina Czermin is a rural gmina (administrative district) in Mielec County, Subcarpathian Voivodeship, in south-eastern Poland. Its seat is the village of Czermin, which lies approximately 10 kilometres (6 mi) north-west of Mielec and 59 km (37 mi) north-west of the regional capital Rzeszów.

The gmina covers an area of 80.32 square kilometres (31.0 sq mi), and as of 2006 its total population is 6,721.

== Villages ==
Gmina Czermin contains the villages and settlements of Breń Osuchowski, Czermin, Dąbrówka Osuchowska, Łysaków, Otałęż, Szafranów, Trzciana, Wola Otałęska and Ziempniów.

== Neighbouring gminas ==
Gmina Czermin is bordered by the gminas of Borowa, Łubnice, Mielec, Szczucin and Wadowice Górne.
