= Pien tze huang =

Traditional Chinese medicine

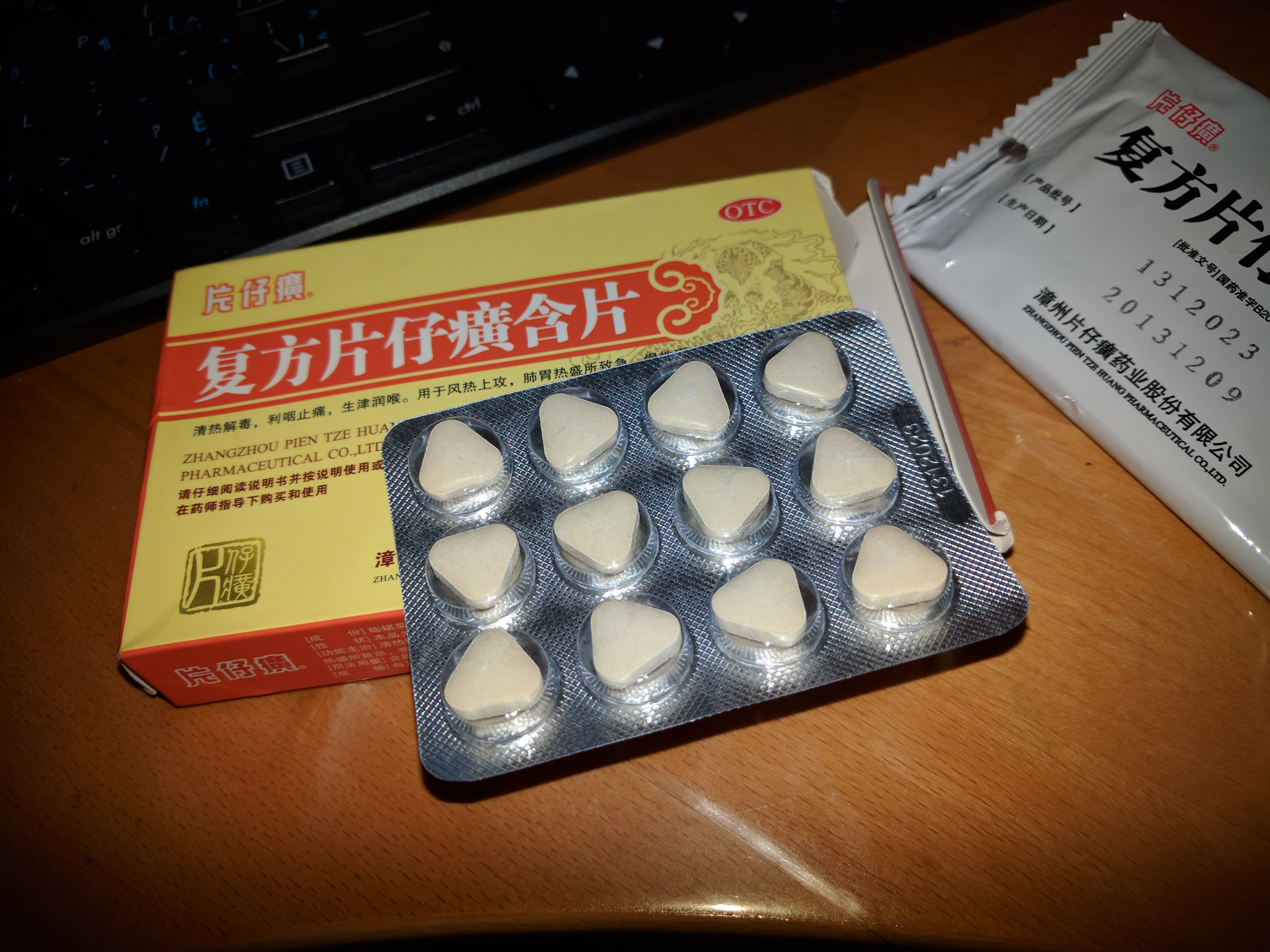
- Pien Tze Huang orally disintegrating tablets
- Traditional Chinese: 片仔癀
- Literal meaning: "heat toxin [and] swelling or pain"
Transcriptions
Standard Mandarin
- Hanyu Pinyin: Piànzǎihuáng

Pien Tze Huang (片仔癀; Piànzǎihuáng) is a traditional Chinese herbal formula first documented during the Ming Dynasty and historically used to combat inflammation. In recent years it has been tested on animals for its benefits against various diseases such as multiple sclerosis, cerebral ischemia, carbon-induced liver damage, and cancer.

Side effects have yet to be seen as PZH has not yet been clinically tested. However, it is commonly sold as oral tablets taken daily (for general health) or as a pearl cream (for acne and freckles), and no side effects have been reported.

== Current production ==
The sole manufacturer of Pien Tze Huang is the Zhang Zhou Pien Tze Huang Pharmaceutical Company Limited, China. The prescription and technology have been classified as state secrets, and the medicine has won the National Gold Award and passed the Country-of-Origin Marking certificate. Additionally, it was ranked #1 in the top 5 exported Traditional Chinese medicines in 2014, and top 10 enterprises in the Traditional Chinese medicine industry in 2015.

The Zhang Zhou PZH Pharmaceutical Company markets Pien Tze Huang as "relieving internal heat and deleting toxin, dispelling stasis and easing pain, stopping bleeding and reducing sores. Used for internal, external or mixed hemorrhoids."

== Traditional uses ==
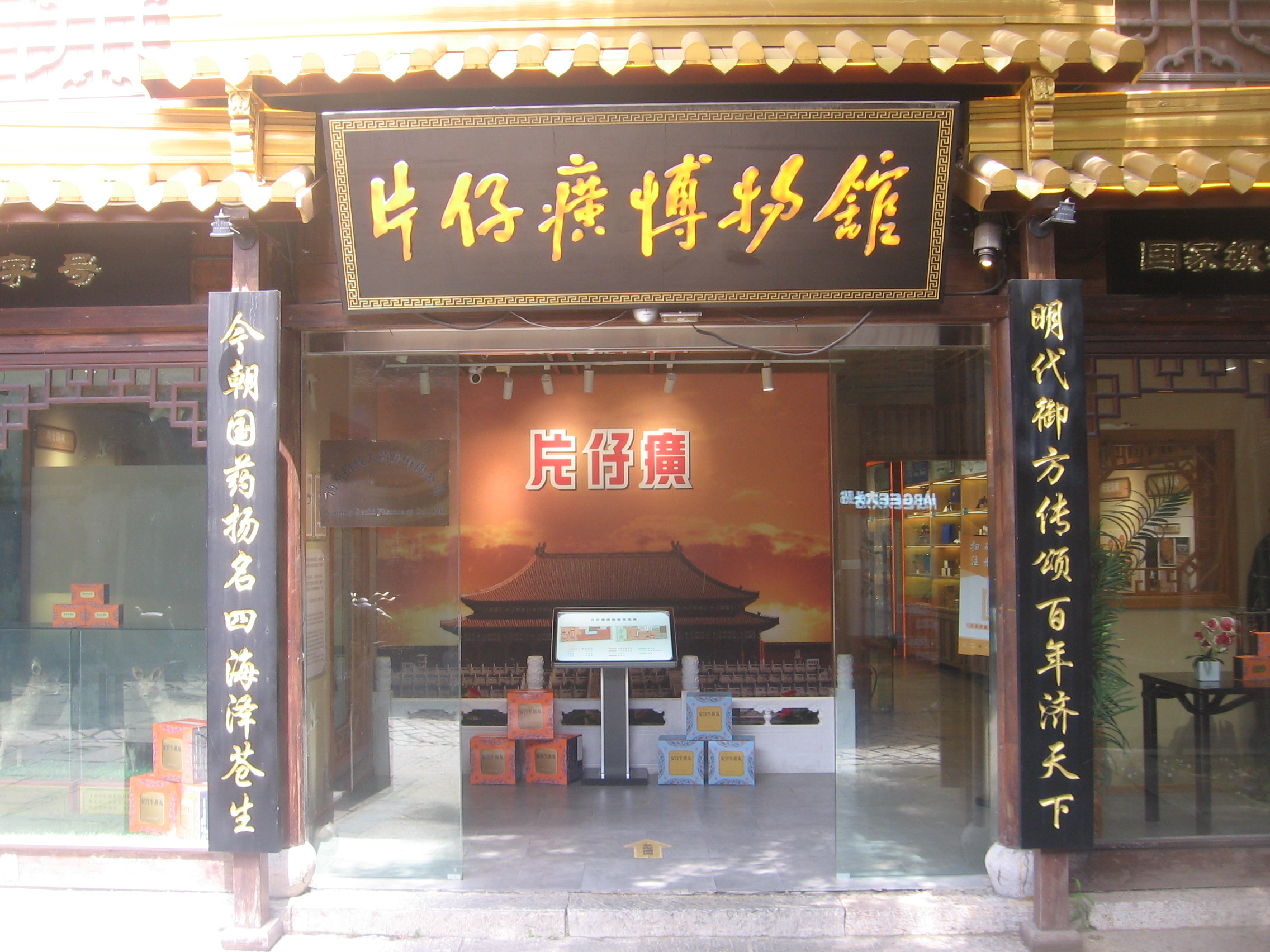
Pien Tze Huang Museum in Nanjing

Pien Tze Huang (PZH) was developed in 1555 A.D. by a court doctor to treat cancer, diseases in the liver, and general pain and swelling. According to the Zhang Zhou PZH Pharmaceutical Company, research on the history of Pien Tze Huang has produced the tale of a royal physician who fled the imperial court with the recipe for PZH, using it to cure scores of locals and increasing its renown as an 'almighty medicine'.

Its primary ingredients are musk, ox gallstone, snake gall, and Tienchi. It has been used as a folk remedy for cancer, inflammation, fever, stomach pain, and acne.

== Modern research ==
While there have been in vitro and animals studies, no clinical trials or studies on humans have so far been performed.

== Side effects ==
A case of drug-induced pneumonia caused by Pien Tze Huang has been reported.

With many traditional Chinese herbal medicines the short-term side effects of headache, nausea or mild gastrointestinal symptoms are frequently seen, although there is little data or statistics due to the lack of research and information.
