= Mielec County =

Mielec County Powiat mielecki
- County
- Flag Coat of arms

- Location within the voivodeship
- Coordinates (Mielec): 50°17′N 21°26′E
- Country: Poland
- Voivodeship: Subcarpathian
- Seat: Mielec
- Gminas: Total 10 (incl. 1 urban): Mielec; Gmina Borowa; Gmina Czermin; Gmina Gawłuszowice; Gmina Mielec; Gmina Padew Narodowa; Gmina Przecław; Gmina Radomyśl Wielki; Gmina Tuszów Narodowy; Gmina Wadowice Górne

Area
  - Total: 880.21 km^{2} (339.85 sq mi)

Population (2019)
  - Total: 136,591
  - Density: 155.18/km^{2} (401.91/sq mi)
  - Urban: 65,372
  - Rural: 71,219
- Car plates: RMI
- Website: www.powiat-mielecki.pl

Mielec County (Polish: powiat mielecki) is a unit of territorial administration and local government (powiat) in Subcarpathian Voivodeship, south-eastern Poland. Its administrative seat and largest town is Mielec, which lies 50 kilometres (31 mi) north-west of the regional capital Rzeszów. It came into being on January 1, 1999, as a result of the Polish local government reforms passed in 1998. The only other towns in the county are Radomyśl Wielki, lying 16 km (10 mi) south-west of Mielec, and Przecław, 11 km (7 mi) south of Mielec.

The county covers an area of 880.21 square kilometres (339.9 sq mi). As of 30 June 2019 its total population was 136,591, out of which the population of Mielec was 60,366, that of Radomyśl Wielki 3,231, and the rural population 72,994 (including approximately 1775 for the population of Przecław, which became a town in 2010).

== Neighbouring counties ==
Mielec County is bordered by Staszów County and Tarnobrzeg County to the north, Kolbuszowa County to the east, Ropczyce-Sędziszów County and Dębica County to the south, and Dąbrowa County to the west.

== Administrative divisions ==
The county is subdivided into 10 gminas (one urban, two urban-rural and seven rural). These are listed in the following table, in descending order of population.

Gmina	Type	Area (km^{2})	Population (2019)	Seat
Mielec	urban	47.4	60,366	
Gmina Radomyśl Wielki	urban-rural	159.6	14,249	Radomyśl Wielki
Gmina Mielec	rural	122.1	13,352	Mielec *
Gmina Przecław	urban-rural	134.3	11,993	Przecław
Gmina Tuszów Narodowy	rural	89.5	8,202	Tuszów Narodowy
Gmina Wadowice Górne	rural	87.2	7,701	Wadowice Górne
Gmina Czermin	rural	80.3	7,051	Czermin
Gmina Borowa	rural	55.5	5,563	Borowa
Gmina Padew Narodowa	rural	70.6	5,379	Padew Narodowa
Gmina Gawłuszowice	rural	33.8	2,735	Gawłuszowice
* seat not part of the gmina
