= Blinkhorn =

Blinkhorn is an English surname. Notable people with the surname include:

- Cec Blinkhorn (1892–1978), Australian professional rugby league footballer
- Fred Blinkhorn (1901–1983), English professional association footballer
- John Blinkhorn (fl. 1847–1857), owner of the Theatre Royal, Gloucester
- Matthew Blinkhorn (born 1985), English professional association footballer
- Paul Blinkhorn, British expert in post-Roman pottery who appeared in the TV series Time Team
- Robert Blinkhorn (c. 1814–1888), Gloucester businessman
- Steve Blinkhorn (born 1949), British occupational psychologist and psychometrician
- Thomas Blinkhorn (1806–1856), pioneer farmer on Vancouver Island in British Columbia
- Tom Blinkhorn (1903–1976), English professional rugby league footballer
