= Sophie Brzeska =

Polish writer and muse

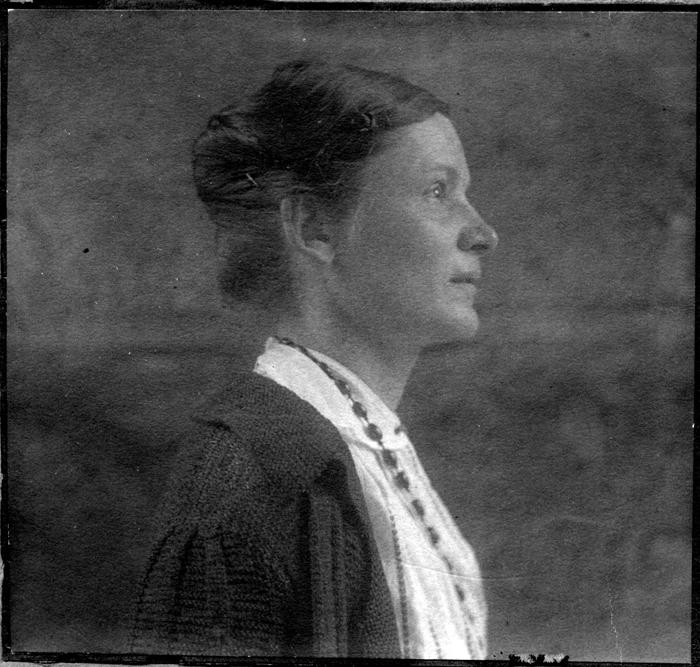
- Sophie Brzeska, c. 1910
- Born: Zofia Brzeska; 6 June 1872; Łączki Brzeskie, Galicia, Austria-Hungary (now Poland)
- Died: 17 March 1925 (aged 52); Coney Hill Hospital, Gloucester, England
- Known for: Writer, muse to Henri Gaudier-Brzeska

Sophie Suzanne Brzeska or Sophie Gaudier-Brzeska (born Zofia Brzeska; 6 June 1872 – 17 March 1925) was a Polish writer and artistic muse most noted for being the companion of the artist Henri Gaudier-Brzeska.

Brzeska and Gaudier met in 1910 in Paris and began an intense relationship. Henri annexed her surname although they never married. Much of what scholars and historians have been able to trace about Sophie Brzeska has come from her personal correspondence with Gaudier. H. S. Ede acquired her papers after her death and drew extensively on her writing when he published A Life of Gaudier-Brzeska (1930).

== Early years ==
Sophie Brzeska was born in Łączki Brzeskie, Galicia, Austria-Hungary (now Poland) in 1872 to a large family of noble descent on her mother's side. Her childhood was difficult and she did not receive a good education.

Her paternal grandfather was a landowner, and her father studied as a lawyer. Brzeska described her father as "a good-for-nothing spendthrift [who] had dissipated his estates to the point of bankruptcy". She has described her mother as "weary" and her father as "womanising", both believing she was a "burden needing to be married off" against her will.

Brzeska was left suicidal by her family's attempts to marry her off, and in 1899 she fled west to become a writer.

She accepted a succession of jobs as governess in various cities, including in Paris, Philadelphia, New York, London, Krakow and in Switzerland. Despite her lack of education, her love of reading and ambition to become a writer helped her gain employment.

She resided in the United States for several years. These ventures with other people's families left her contemplating suicide.

== Life with Henri Gaudier-Brzeska ==
Brzeska and Gaudier met in January 1910 at the Bibliothèque Sainte-Geneviève in Paris, and began an intense symbiotic relationship. Gaudier (born 1891) described her in a letter to a friend as "a Polish ex-governess twice his age."

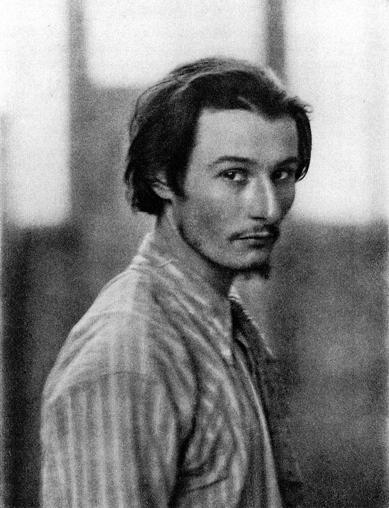
Henri Gaudier-Brzeska, Brzeska's companion

Brzeska was a companion and her relationship with Gaudier resembled a co-dependency because both suffered from mental health issues and stress brought on by poverty. Henri was devoted to Sophie, even taking her last name as his, but Sophie often was dismissive and cold toward Henri's romantic overtures (according to Ede, they never had sex or only once or twice or rarely). They were often apart, and Sophie would buy Henri prostitutes for his enjoyment instead of having sexual relations with him.

== Writings ==
Brzeska referred constantly to her "work" and aspirations to be a published writer. She wrote a number of versions of her autobiography entitled Matka but nothing in her own words was published until 2008. The book Matka and Other Writings (London: Mercury Graphics; includes some texts translated from French by Gillian Raffles) was from manuscript sheets which had lain unpublished for over 50 years. One part of this group of papers is a version of Matka, and it includes her first meeting and her life with Henri Gaudier, and their adoption of the name Gaudier-Brzeska. It contains her account of what happened to her immediately after Henri Gaudier-Brzeska was killed at the Front in France in 1915, graphically recounts her efforts and trials to arrange a memorial exhibition of his work, and gives a frank view of how she felt his friends T. E. Hulme, Ezra Pound, Robert Bevan and others behaved toward her. Also included are later postcards and letters to the artist Nina Hamnett.

Brzeska wrote in both French and English, and it is clear from the language and tempo of the writings that she was highly strung and emotional. When writing in English, her spelling becomes progressively more chaotic as did her handwriting in both languages. The intention of the editor has been to keep these elements evident in the translation and transcription in order to be true to her character and escalating emotional intensity and to hear her unique voice. Her ignoring of conventional punctuation has been retained for the same reason.

An admirer of Gaudier's work, the art collector and historian H. S. Ede acquired her estate in 1927 from the British Treasury Solicitor after she died intestate. This acquisition included not only her writings, but also those of Henri Gaudier, with many of his works and papers. Ede drew extensively on the letters written by Gaudier to Brzeska, and her writings and other material, when he published A Life of Gaudier-Brzeska (London: W. Heinemann) in 1930; the 1931 and later editions are entitled Savage Messiah. Time Magazine called his book a "sympathetic but perfectly impersonal...biography." The papers he used for this account are now in the archives of Cambridge University Library, the University of Essex, and the Musée des Beaux-Arts d'Orléans. In 2008 Sophie's unexpurgated writings were published.

== Later years and death ==
Brzeska moved to Wotton-under-Edge in Gloucestershire in 1916. Her mental state deteriorated and in 1922 she was committed to the County Mental Hospital where she was registered as Sophia Susanna Gaudier Brzeska.

She died of pneumonia in the Gloucestershire County Mental Hospital, Barnwood, Gloucestershire on 17 March 1925. She was initially buried in an unmarked pauper's grave at Tredworth Road Cemetery in Gloucester. To mark the centenary of her death, a permanent stone grave marker was funded by public donation and officially unveiled at her gravesite.

== In other media ==
The relationship between Henri Gaudier and Sophie Brzeska was fictionalised in the 1934 stage play The Laughing Woman by Josephine Tey under the pen name 'Gordon Daviot'.

She was often left out of accounts of Gaudier's life. Savage Messiah, Ken Russell's 1972 film based on Ede's book, focuses on Sophie and Henri Gaudier's relationship giving them equal importance in shaping each other's lives. In the film she was played by Dorothy Tutin.

== Sources ==
- Pound, Ezra, Gaudier-Brzeska: a Memoir. London: John Lane, 1916; rpt. New York: New Directions, 1970 ISBN 0-8112-0527-4 (a memoir of Pound's time with Gaudier-Brzeska, including letters and photos of sculpture)
- "We the Moderns": Gaudier-Brzeska and the Birth of Modern Sculpture. Cambridge: Kettle's Yard, 2007 ISBN 1-904561-22-5 (catalogue of an exhibition of the same name)
- Licence, Amy, Bohemian Lives. Three Extraordinary Women: Ida Nettleship, Sophie Brzeska and Fernande Olivier. Amberley, 2017. ISBN 978-1-44567-064-5
