= Tredworth Road Cemetery =

Cemetery in Gloucester, England

Coordinates: 51.8492°N 2.2305°W

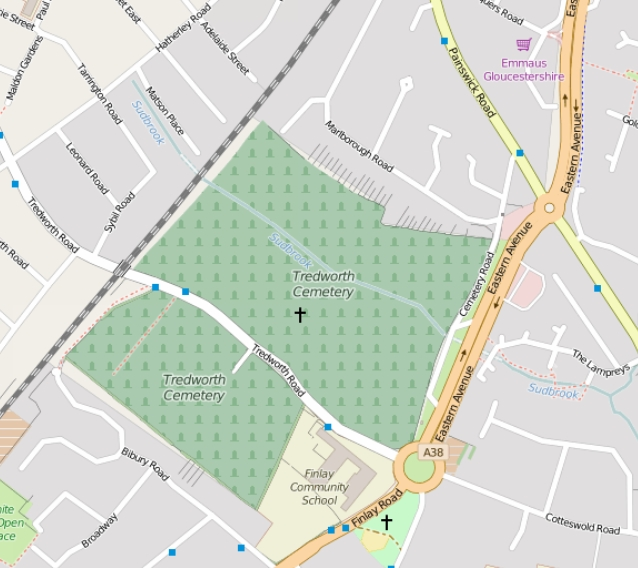
The immediate vicinity of Tredworth Road Cemetery

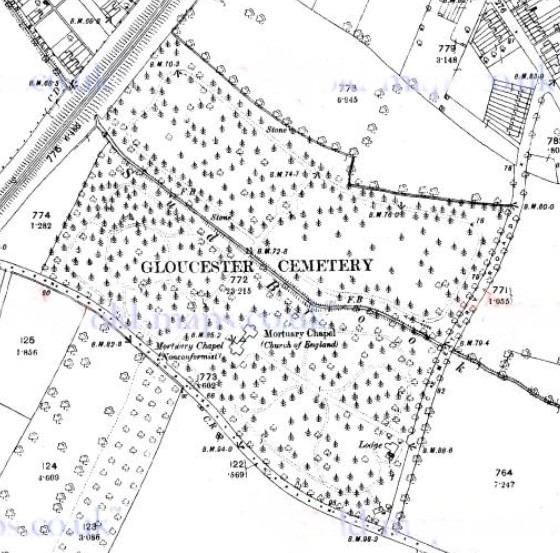
The cemetery on an 1884 Ordnance Survey map, before it was extended

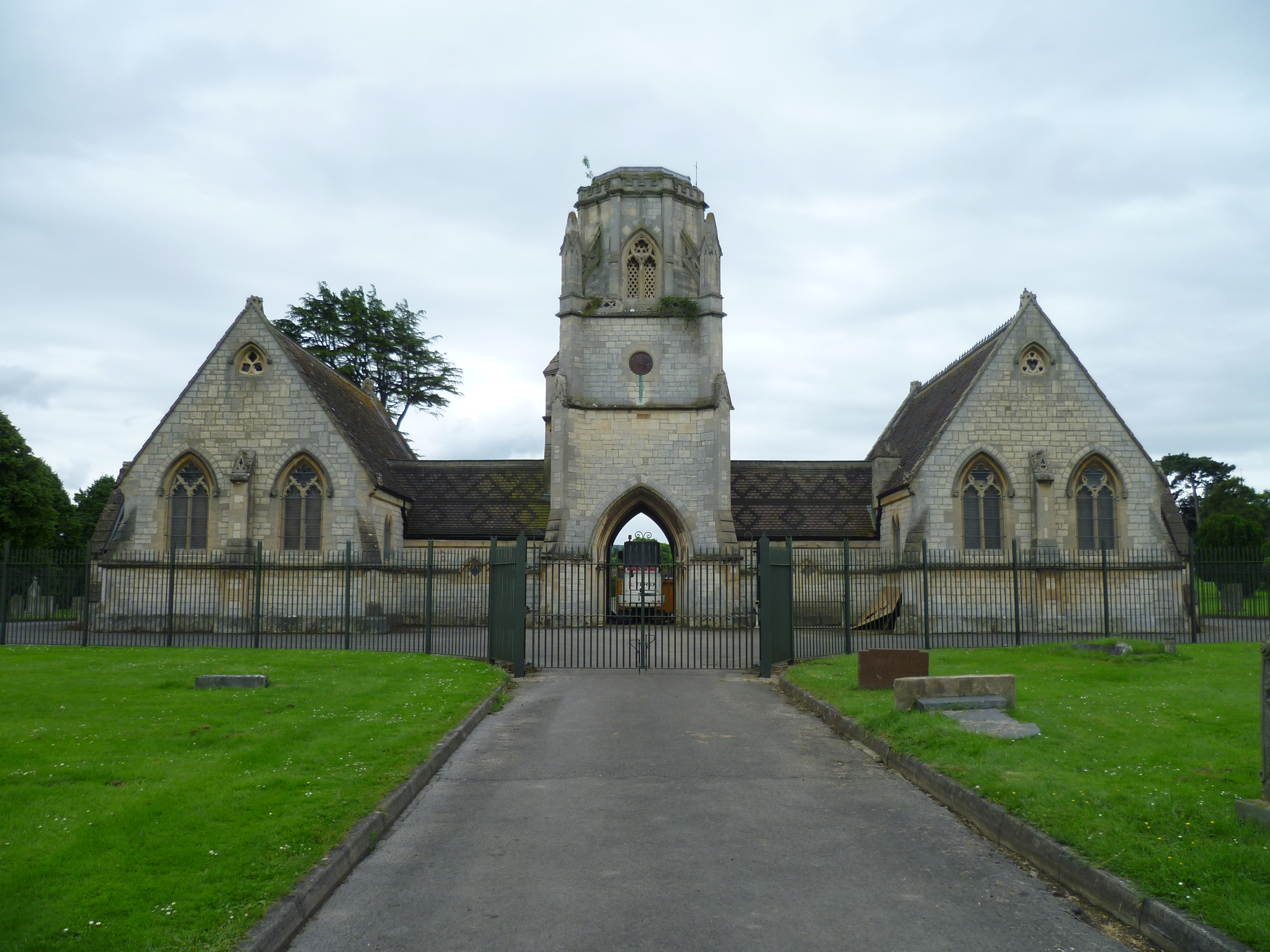
Tredworth Road Cemetery chapel

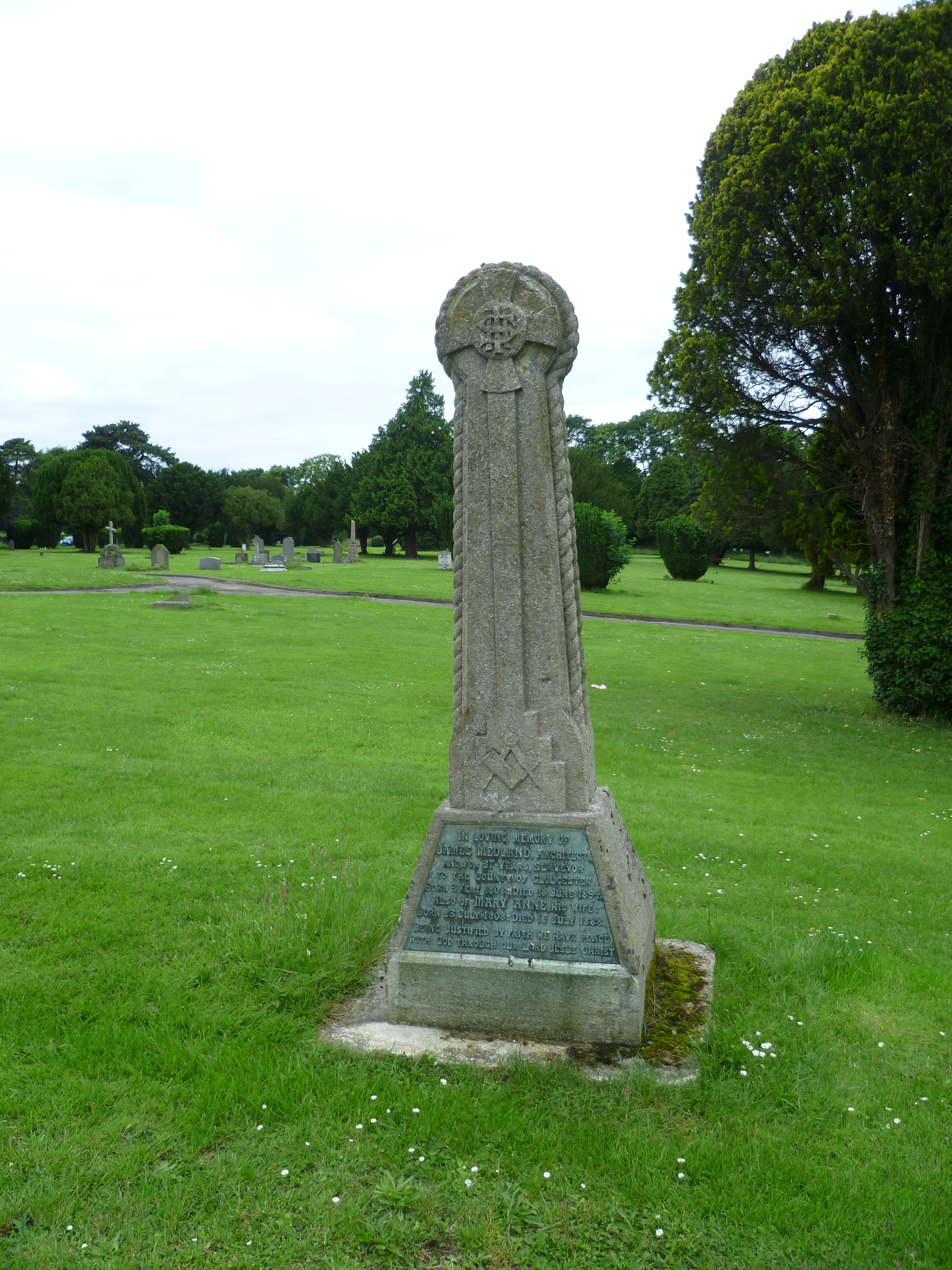
The grave of James Medland, designer of the chapel, and his wife at Tredworth Road Cemetery

Tredworth Road Cemetery, sometimes known as Gloucester Old Cemetery, is a cemetery in Gloucester, England, that is run by Gloucester City Council. In addition, it contains over 250 war graves maintained by the Commonwealth War Graves Commission. The cemetery chapel is a Grade II listed building.

== Location ==
The cemetery lies on Tredworth Road and Cemetery Road and occupies 35 acres. The Sudbrook crosses the northern part of the area.

== History ==
A burial board was formed for the city of Gloucester in 1856 and the Tredworth Road Cemetery opened in 1857 after which the dead of the city ceased to be interred in the old city churchyards formerly used for that purpose. The cemetery was originally of 13 acres to the north of Tredworth Road but it was extended in 1875, 1909 and 1911 to include land to the south of the road by which time it covered 35 acres. The two areas were known as the "old cemetery" and the "new cemetery". When Coney Hill Cemetery and Crematorium was opened in 1939, the whole of the Tredworth Road Cemetery became known colloquially as Gloucester Old Cemetery with the northern part known as "chapel side" and the southern side as the "B" ground.

Between 1976 and 1987, Gloucester City Council deliberately destroyed many attractive marble and granite memorials from the Chapel Side of the Old Cemetery, solely to allow better access for industrial sized lawn-mowers. Details of the gravestones, including the epitaphs carefully chiselled many years previously, were at least recorded and the transcriptions are available to view in the National Archives and via Gloucestershire Family History Society.

The cemetery was in the news in 2013 due to an attempted grave robbery.

The cemetery is maintained by the Gloucester City Council.

== Chapel ==
The cemetery chapel, on the north side of the site, was designed in the Gothic style by Medland and Maberly for the Corporation of the City of Gloucester. It is symmetrical with parallel chapels for Anglicans and Nonconformists joined by a central carriageway. It is Grade II listed by Historic England who describe it as "a fine example of the type of linked chapels often provided in corporation cemeteries in the C19".

== War graves ==
The cemetery contains burials from both world wars. There are 158 graves from the First World War, the majority in the original part of the cemetery, of which 81 are in a separate war graves plot. There are also 94 Second World War burials, mostly in the new part, of which 60 are in a separate war graves plot. Both have a Cross of Sacrifice. In addition there are 10 non world war service burials and 7 foreign national burials in the cemetery.

Burials are from all of the services, including 41 from the Gloucestershire Regiment, four Australians, one Belgian, two men of the German Army, two of the Italian Army, two of the Polish Air Force, five of the Royal Canadian Air Force, three of the Royal New Zealand Air Force, and one South African.

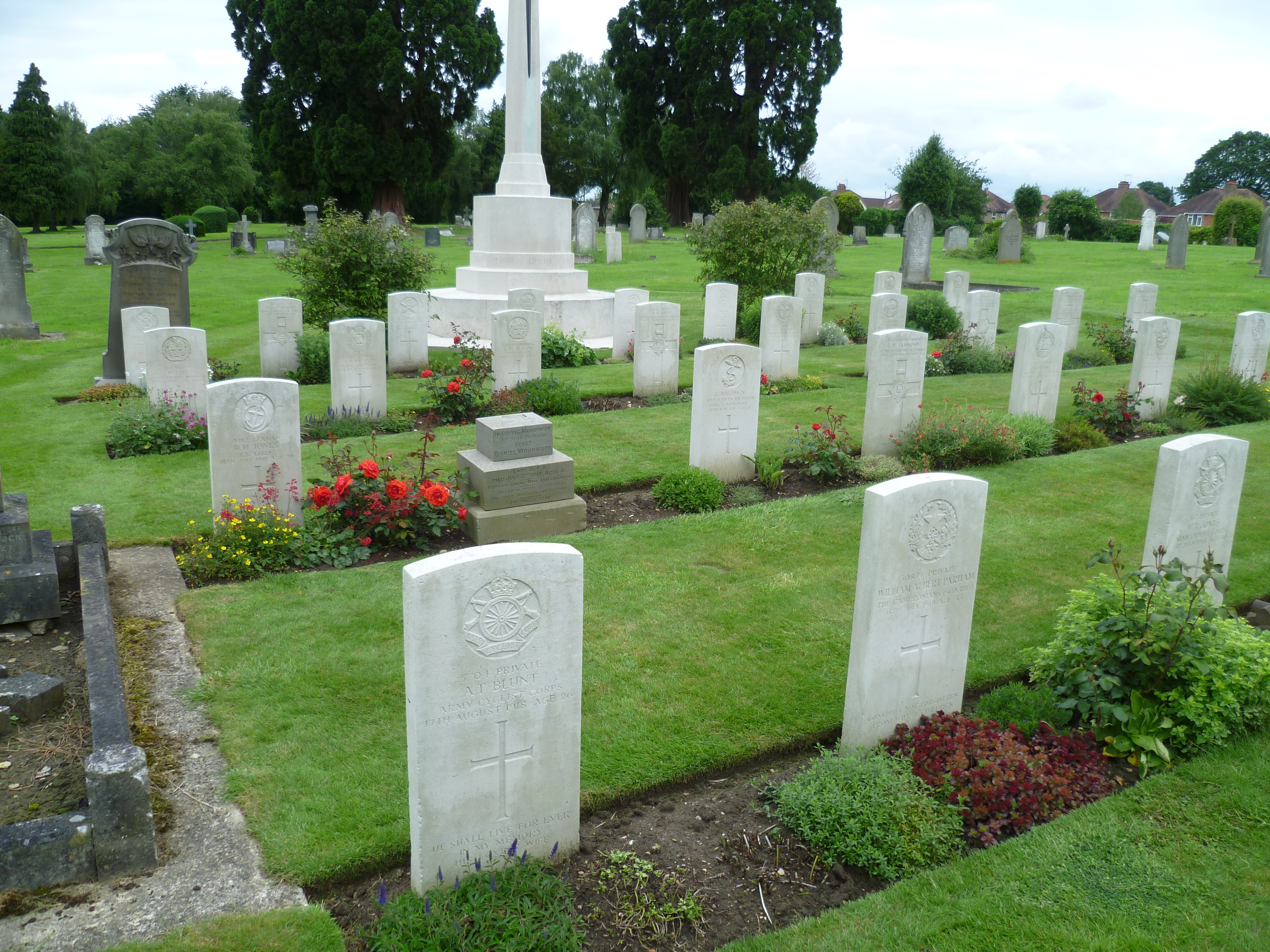
First World War graves at the chapel side war graves plot

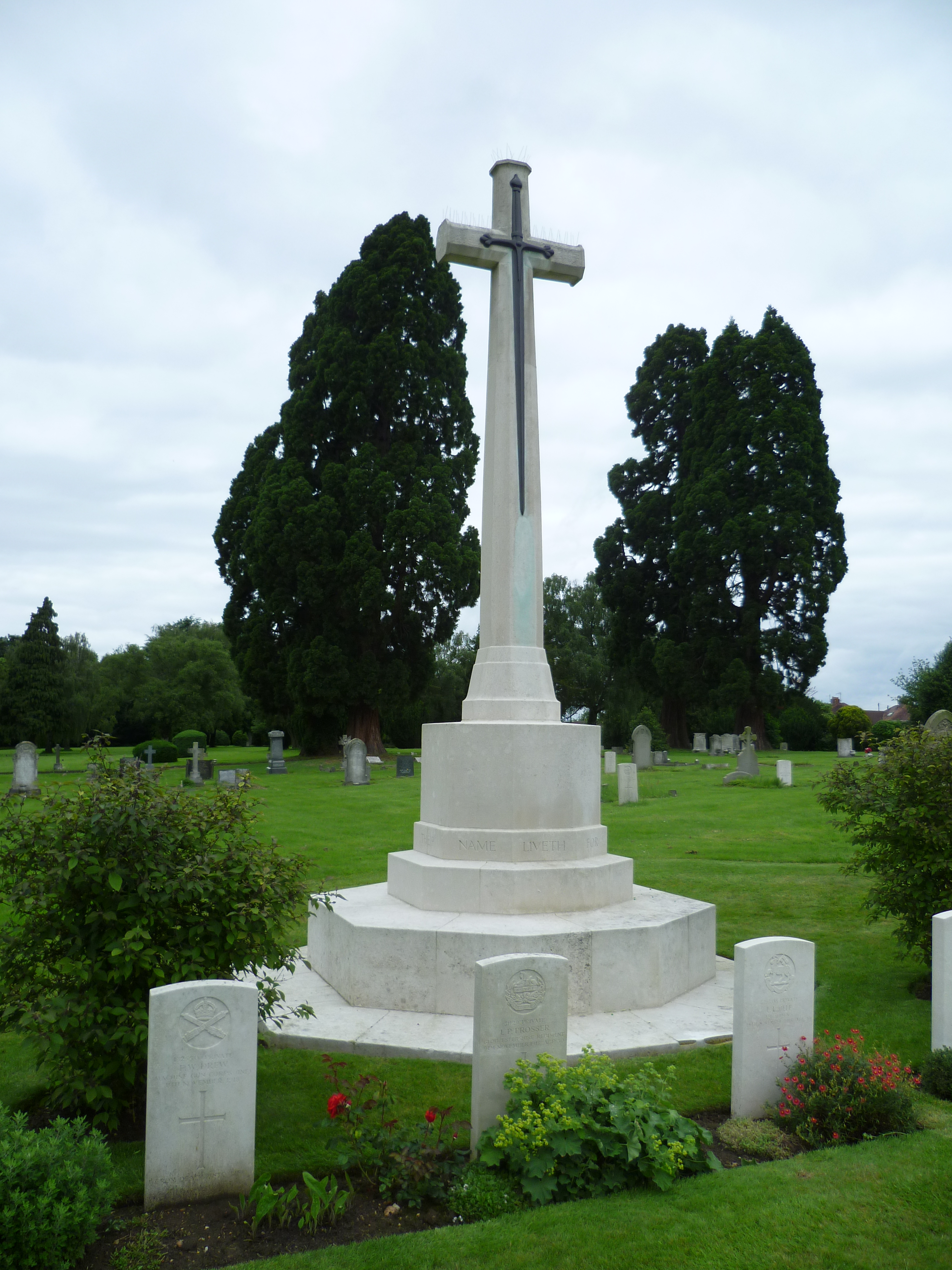
The chapel side cross of sacrifice

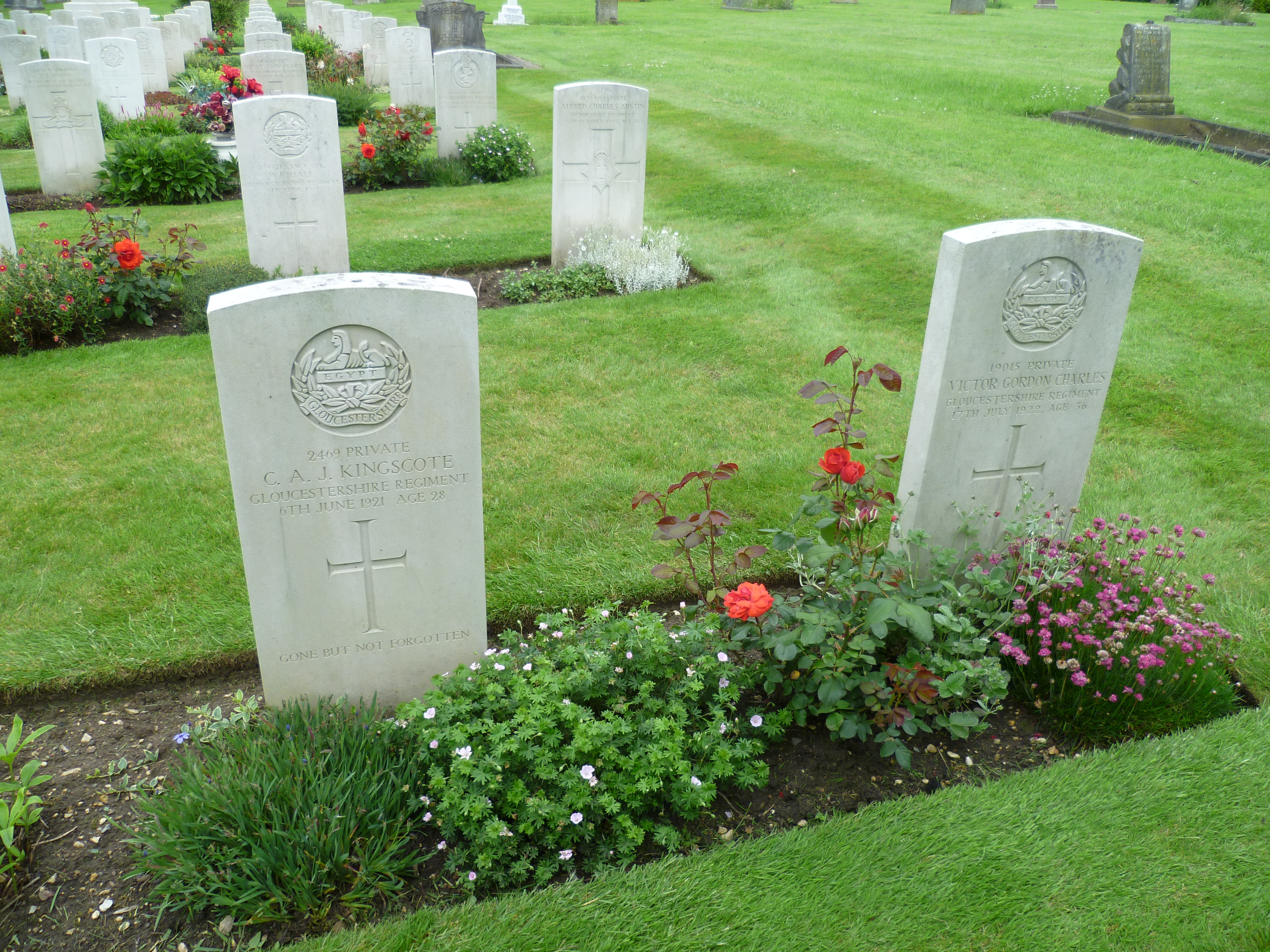
Graves of men of the Gloucestershire Regiment

== Notable interments ==
- Robert Blinkhorn, businessman and Alderman of the City of Gloucester
- Sophie Brzeska, writer
- Herbert Haines, teacher and scholar of monumental brasses
- James Medland, architect to the City of Gloucester
