= Ford Park Cemetery =

Cemetery in Plymouth, Devon

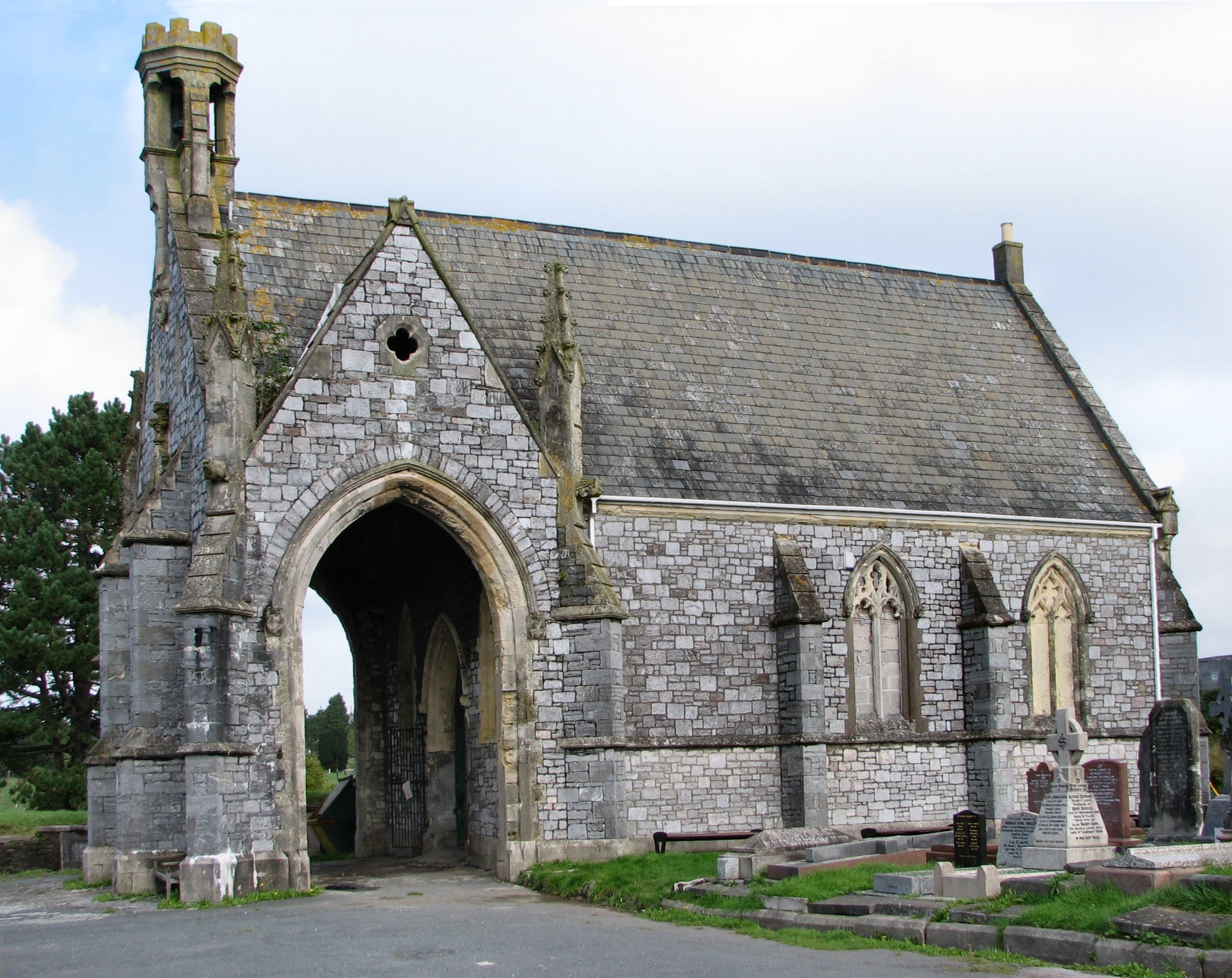
- The Victorian chapel in the cemetery
- Interactive map of Ford Park Cemetery

Details
- Established: 1846
- Location: Plymouth, Devon, England
- Coordinates: 50°22′59″N 4°8′36″W
- Type: public
- Owned by: Ford Park Cemetery Trust
- Size: 34.5-acre (140,000 m^{2})
- No. of graves: about 250,000
- Website: Ford Park Cemetery Trust
- Find a Grave: Ford Park Cemetery

Ford Park Cemetery is a 34.5-acre (140,000 m^{2}) cemetery in central Plymouth, England, established by the Plymouth, Stonehouse & Devonport Cemetery Company in 1846 and opened in 1848. At the time it was outside the boundary of the Three Towns and was created to alleviate the overcrowding in the churchyards of the local parish churches. Its official name at the time of inception was The Plymouth, Devonport and Stonehouse Cemetery (renamed in 2000), although it is now seldom referred to by that title.

The cemetery was originally 18 acres (73,000 m^{2}) in size, but a further 16.5 acres (67,000 m^{2}) were added in 1875. It came into use during one of the largest outbreaks of cholera in the country and during its first year it saw over 400 burials related to that disease. During Victorian times it was the main cemetery for the Three Towns, and it is estimated that approximately a quarter of a million people are buried within its grounds. The older burial records have been deposited with the Plymouth and West Devon Record Office.

Among the more famous graves is that of the Reverend Robert Stephen Hawker, the author of The Song of the Western Men. As at November 2016 there are 769 war graves from the First World War, over 200 of which are in a dedicated naval plot; and 198 war graves of the Second World War (including an unidentified airman) are scattered throughout the site. A Victoria Cross (VC) recipient of the Crimean War, Captain Andrew Henry, Royal Artillery, is buried here, as is another VC recipient, of the Taiping Rebellion, Quartermaster George Hinckley, Royal Navy.

The Victorian chapel building designed by J. R. Hamilton and J. M. Medland is Grade II listed, as is the older burial area nearest the chapel including a large circular vault. Until one was severely damaged by enemy air attack during World War II, there was a second (identical) non-conformist chapel to the right of the unscathed Anglican building. Both are shown, together with the then abutting farmland and the playing fields of Plymouth College in a well known 1889 photograph now in the Francis Frith collection under the title 'Plymouth, the cemetery 1889'. Along the north-east side is the connected but walled-off Plymouth Jewish Cemetery.

During the 1970s and 80s, poor management, a loss of revenue because few people were paying for the maintenance of plots, and the popularity of cremation, all led to the dilapidation of the site. In January 1988, seventeen-year-old Patricia Hicks was murdered in the overgrown cemetery. After the original cemetery company went into liquidation and after much public debate, in 2000 a trust was set up which reopened the cemetery, made dangerous structures safe, cleared the undergrowth, obtained renovation grants and created a walking trail around some of the graves of notable people. The older of the two chapels which is shown above right in a photograph of its unrestored state has now been fully restored and refurbished as a setting for all varieties of religious or secular funeral or memorial services and is also used for concerts and other events.

The cemetery is a member of the Association of Significant Cemeteries in Europe and the trust was awarded the Queen's Award for Voluntary Service in 2005. As at 2009, there are further plans for numerous works to restore and improve various parts of the cemetery, aided by the Heritage Lottery Fund, including the renovation of the Anglican chapel, and provision of a memorial to the civilian dead of World War Two. It is estimated there are over 10,000 usable grave spaces remaining in the cemetery. The cemetery has rapidly become popular again as an attractive convenient and semi-rural setting close to the city centre and the densely populated but fashionable Victorian and Edwardian suburbs.

The City of Plymouth has two large early-twentieth-century municipal cemeteries at Weston Mill and Efford, each with chapels and now crematoria and the Drake Memorial Garden is near Elburton.

== Notable burials ==
- Robert Hawker (1803–1875), the talented poet best known for the "Song of the Western Men", better known as the Cornish anthem "Trelawney"
- Mary Ann Hockaday, a matron for 40 years at the South Devon and Cornwall Institution for the Blind
- Jimmy Peters (1879–1954), rugby player, notable as the first black man to play rugby for England
- Mabel Ramsey (1878–1954), Plymouth's first woman surgeon who was the first woman to be appointed surgeon-gynaecologist at Plymouth City Hospital.
