= Coney Hill =

Area of Gloucester in England

Coordinates: 51.8521°N 2.2155°W

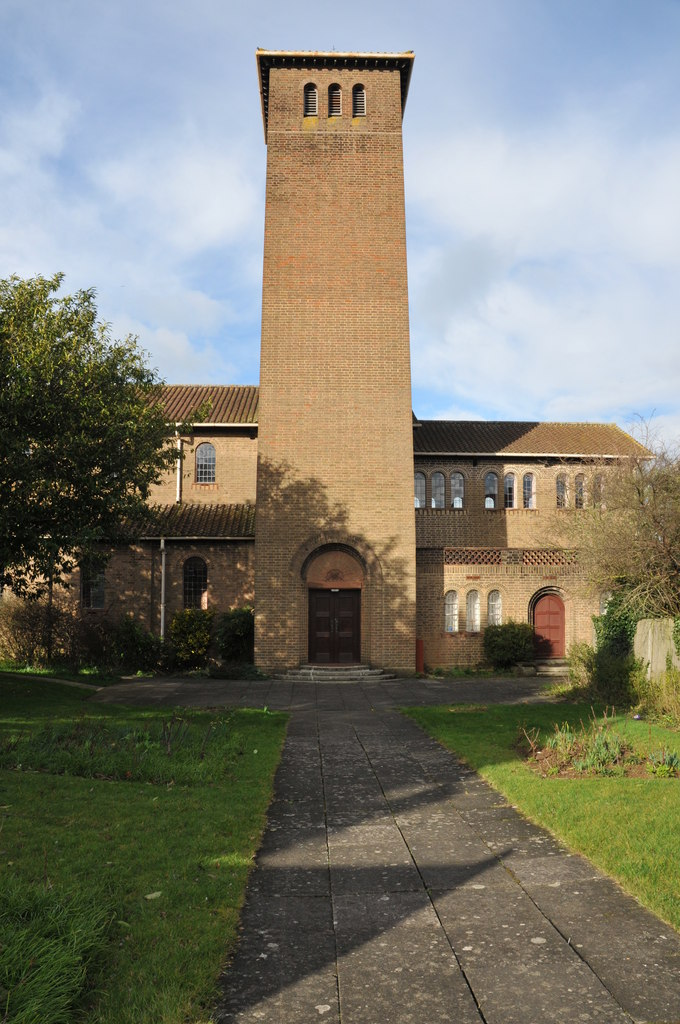
- St Oswald's Church

- Location within Gloucestershire
- Population: 3,401 (2021 census)
- District: Gloucester
- Shire county: Gloucestershire
- Region: South West
- Country: England
- Sovereign state: United Kingdom
- Police: Gloucestershire
- Fire: Gloucestershire
- Ambulance: South Western

Coney Hill is a suburb of Gloucester in Gloucestershire, England, consisting of a Ward of the City of Gloucester. As of 2021, it has a population of 3,401.

== History ==
The area started to be developed around the 1870s due to urban sprawl from the city, and originally fell in the village of Barnwood. Between 1882 and 1900, various sections of land were moved from Barnwood to the City of Gloucester, including the area of Coney Hill.

The Coney Hill Hospital was opened in 1883.

The area is mainly made up of residential accommodation, with Coney Hill Cemetery and Crematorium opening in the 1930s. The area saw heavy redevelopment in the 1950s, linking the area up with Barnwood.

== Transport ==
The area is served by a number of Stagecoach West services to Gloucester.

== Facilities ==
The area has a rugby team, Coney Hill RFC, that was formed in 1947 and is based on Metz Way.
