= Warstone Lane Cemetery =

Cemetery in Birmingham, England

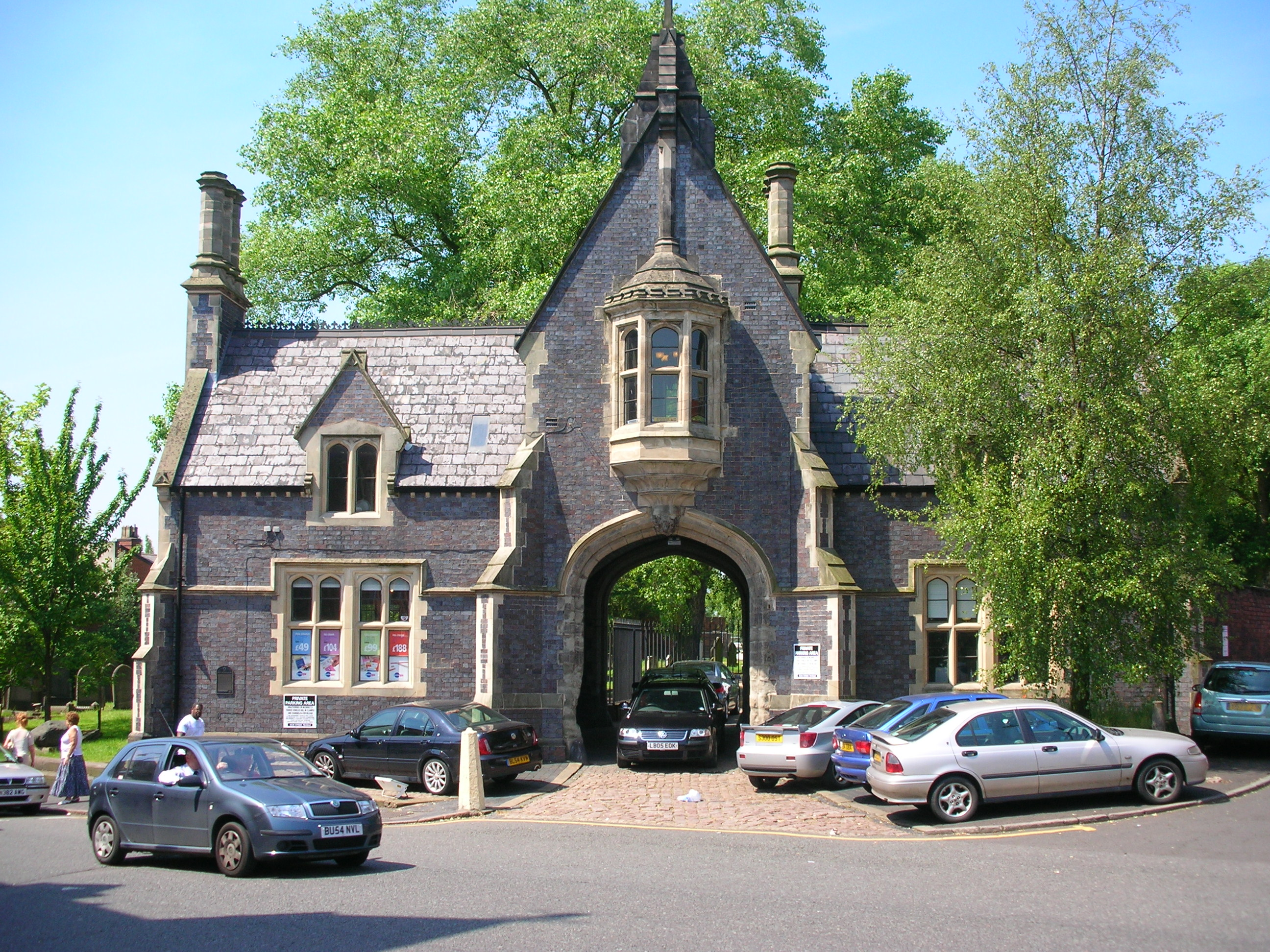
- Entrance lodge
- Interactive map of Warstone Lane Cemetery

Details
- Established: 1848
- Closed: 1982
- Location: Jewellery Quarter, Birmingham
- Country: England
- Coordinates: 52°29′17″N 1°54′50″W
- Type: Church of England
- Owned by: Birmingham City Council
- Size: 8.2 acres (3.3 ha)
- No. of graves: 93,000 (including interments)
- Website: jqrt.org
- Find a Grave: Warstone Lane Cemetery

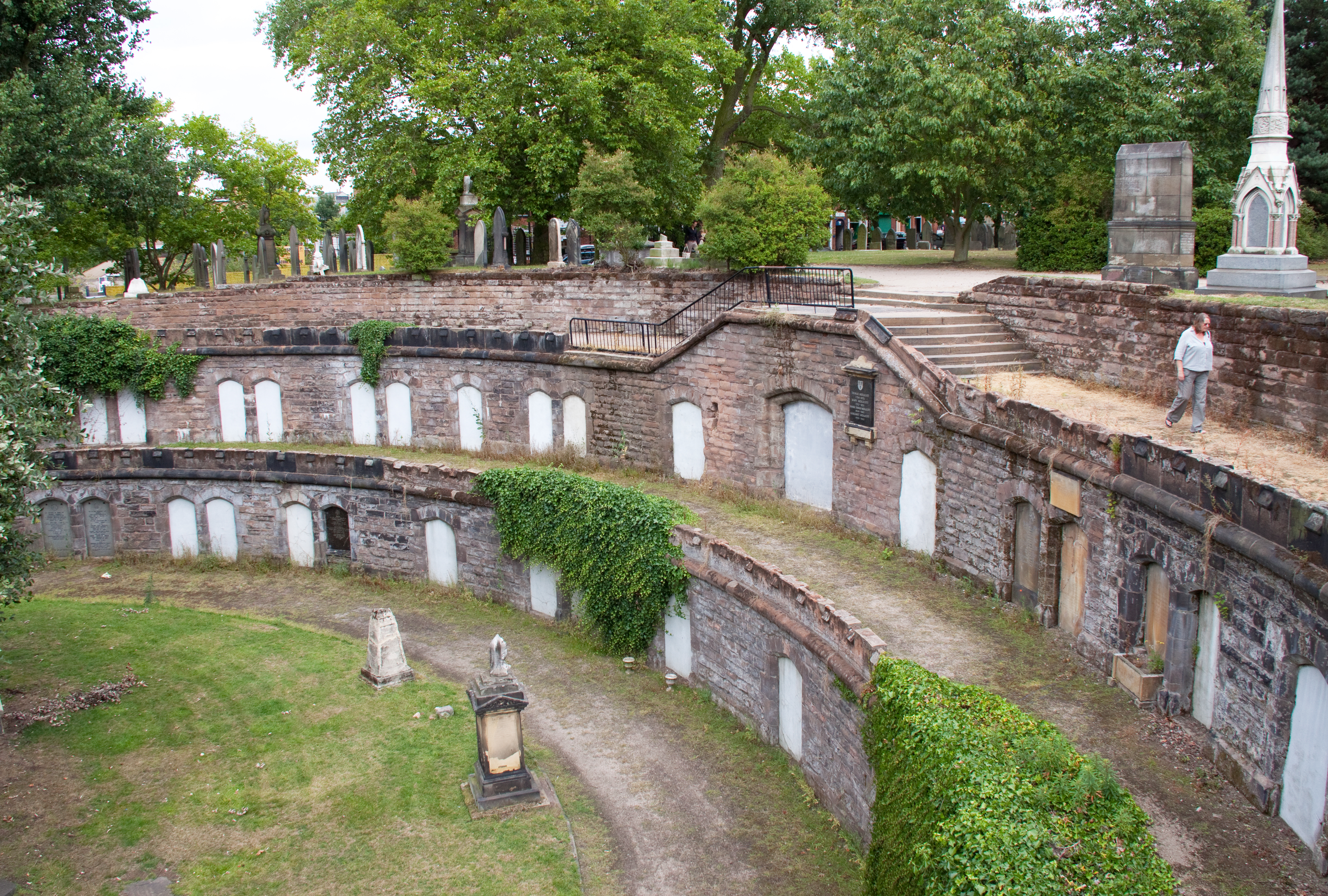
Catacombs

Warstone Lane Cemetery, (grid reference SP059877), also called Brookfields Cemetery, Church of England Cemetery, or Mint Cemetery (from the adjacent Birmingham Mint), is a cemetery dating from 1847 in Birmingham, England. It is one of two cemeteries in the city's Jewellery Quarter, in Hockley (the other being Key Hill Cemetery). It is no longer open to new burials.

A major feature is the two tiers of catacombs, whose unhealthy vapours led to the Birmingham Cemeteries Act which required that non-interred coffins should be sealed with lead or pitch.

== History ==
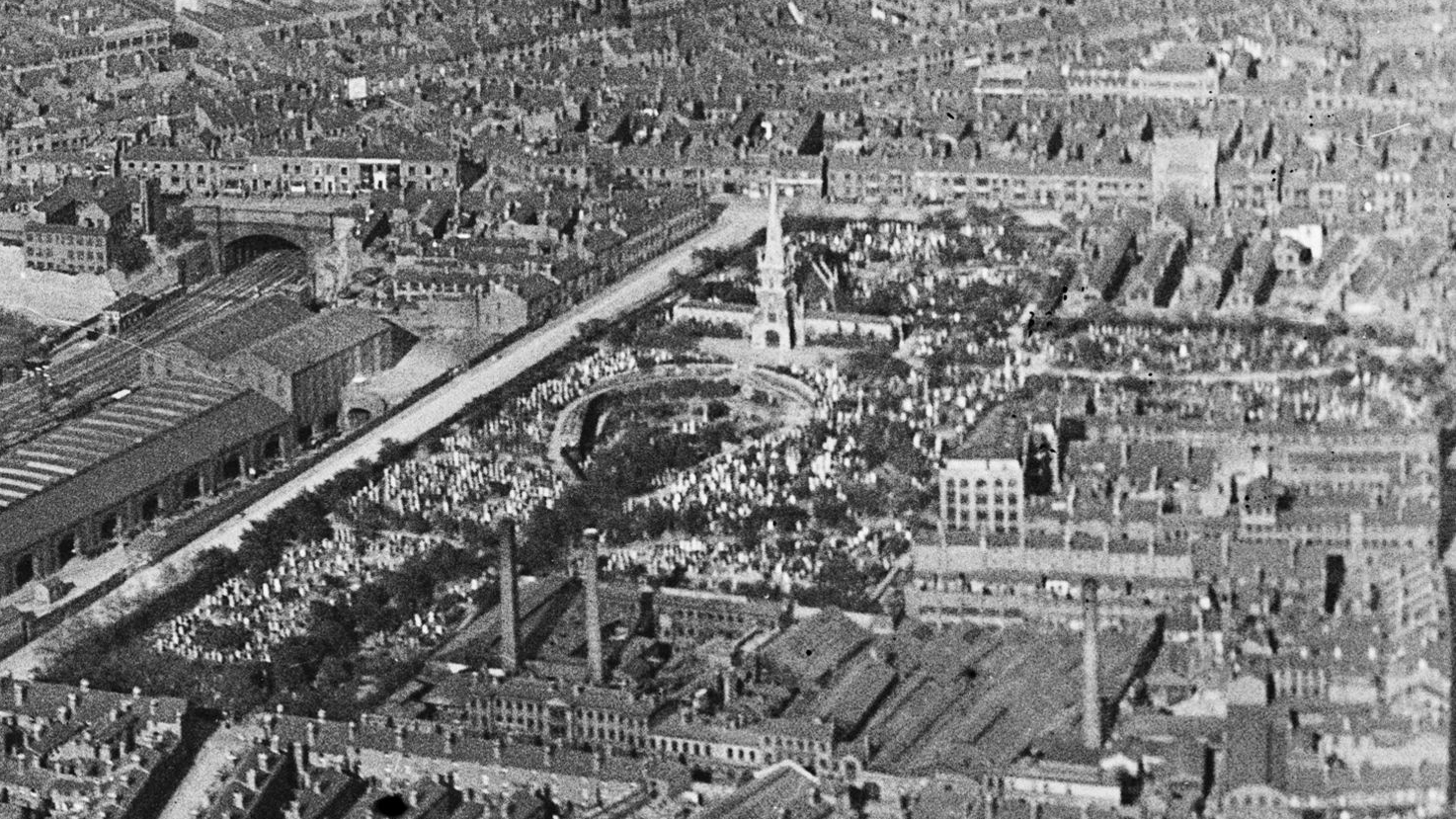
1920 aerial photo, with Birmingham Mint in the foreground

The foundation stone for the chapel (demolished 1954) was laid on 6 April 1847. The blue brick gate lodge building, designed by J. R. Hamilton and J. M. Medland and built in 1847–8, survives, and is a Grade II listed building. The cemetery is itself Grade II on the Register of Parks and Gardens of Special Historic Interest. The cemetery was originally reserved for members of the established Church of England, whereas Key Hill (opened in 1836) was non-denominational, and was therefore favoured by nonconformists.

In the Birmingham Blitz of World War II St Michaels and All Saints chapel in Warstone Cemetery was damaged beyond repair and later razed. Meanwhile, on the night of 11 December 1940, all but the tower and classical west portico of St Thomas' Church, Bath Row, was destroyed by German bombs. The church was not rebuilt. The grounds were laid out for the coronation of Queen Elizabeth II in 1953 when the gravestones were removed and the dead reinterred at Warstone Lane Cemetery. The gardens were re-designed as the St. Thomas's Peace Garden in 1995 in commemoration of the 50th anniversary of the end of World War II.

A comprehensive list of memorial inscriptions is being prepared by The Jewellery Quarter Research Group, to be published on its website.

A campaign group, The Friends of Key Hill and Warstone Lane Cemeteries, seeks to preserve and protect the cemetery.

== Notable burials ==
- Warrulan (circa 1835–1855) – an Aboriginal Australian, brought to England in 1845
- Joseph Allday (1798–1861) – radical politician
- Dr Pye Chavasse (1810–1879) – medical author
- Harry Gem (1819–1881) – lawn tennis pioneer
- John Postgate (1820–1881) – surgeon and food safety campaigner
- Clement Mansfield Ingleby (1823–1886) – solicitor and poet
- James Cooper (1840–1889) – soldier awarded the Victoria Cross
- John Baskerville (1706–1775) – manufacturer, reinterred here in 1897: an atheist

There are also buried in the cemetery 51 Commonwealth servicemen of World War I and 13 from World War II. A Screen Wall memorial, by a Cross of Sacrifice, lists those whose graves are not marked by headstones.

== Sources ==
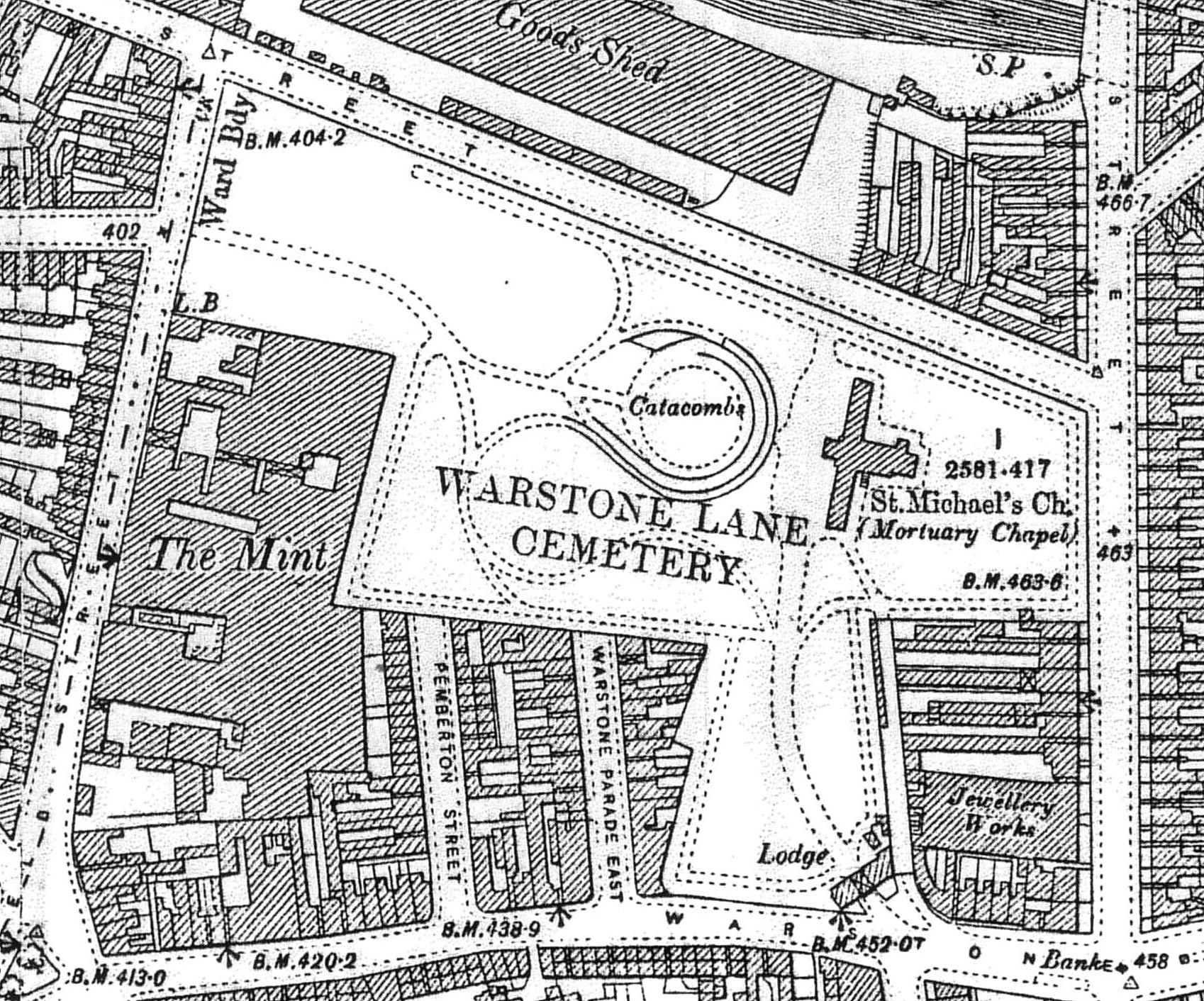
1903 Ordnance Survey Map

- Foster, Andy (2005). Birmingham. Pevsner Architectural Guides. New Haven, CT: Yale University Press. ISBN 0300107315.
- Haddleton, Marie Elizabeth (1987). The Jewellery Quarter – History and Guide. Birmingham: Y.B.A. Publications. ISBN 0951310801.
