= George Hinckley =

Recipient of the Victoria Cross (1819–1904)

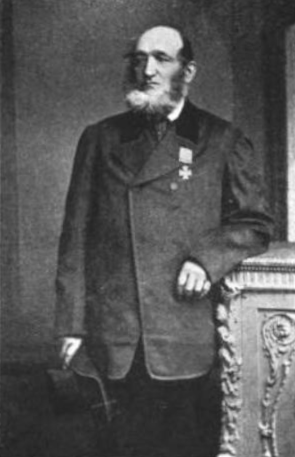
- Born: 22 June 1819; Liverpool, England
- Died: 31 December 1904 (aged 85); Plymouth, England
- Burial place: Ford Park Cemetery, Plymouth
- Military career
- Allegiance: United Kingdom
- Branch: Royal Navy
- Rank: Quartermaster
- Units: HMS Sphinx
- Conflicts: Taiping Rebellion
- Awards: Victoria Cross

George Hinckley, VC (22 June 1819 – 31 December 1904) was a sailor in the Royal Navy and a recipient of the Victoria Cross, the highest award for gallantry in the face of the enemy that can be awarded to British and Commonwealth forces.

== Details ==
Hinckley was 43 years old, and an able seaman in the Royal Navy serving in the Naval Brigade during the Taiping Rebellion when the following deed took place for which he was awarded the VC.

On 9 October 1862 in Fenghua, China, Able Seaman Hinckley volunteered to go to the rescue of the assistant master of the Sphinx, who was lying in the open severely wounded. The able seaman went out under heavy and continuous fire and carried the assistant master to the shelter of a jess-house 150 yards (140 m) away. He then returned and carried a wounded army captain to safety.

Hinckley later achieved the rank of quartermaster.
