= Theatre Royal, Gloucester =

Former theatre in Gloucester, England

Coordinates: 51.8660°N 2.2469°W

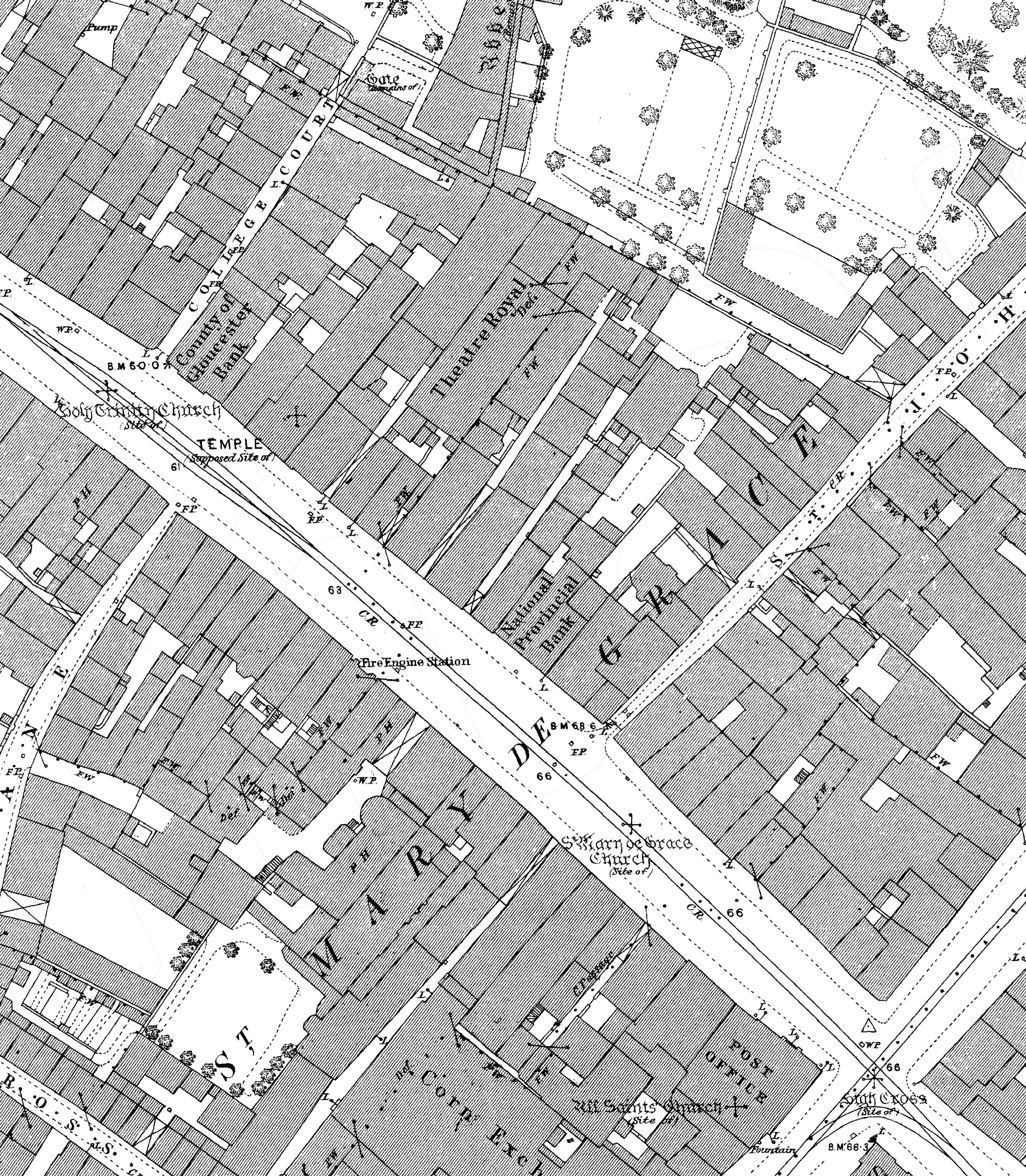
Location of the Theatre Royal Gloucester (centre) on an 1880s Ordnance Survey map.

The Theatre Royal at Gloucester, at which Charles Dickens once performed, was an important theatre in the history of the city.

The theatre was built in 1791 by John Boles Watson in upper Westgate Street. Watson died in 1813, and the theatre was sold to the businessman John Blinkhorn in 1857. Charles Dickens once performed the trial scene from The Pickwick Papers to a capacity audience. At its centenary in 1891, Sir Henry Irving and Ellen Terry both appeared with members of the Lyceum Company. In 1902 the theatre was sold again to Charles Poole who changed it to a variety theatre and picture house. Myriorama shows were given. The theatre closed in the early 1920s and was replaced by Woolworths in 1922. The site is currently a discount store.

The Theatre Vaults public house was located nearby.
