= Saint Mary's Episcopal Church (Hillsboro, Ohio) =

Historic church in Ohio, United States

- Saint Mary's Episcopal Church and Parish House
- U.S. National Register of Historic Places
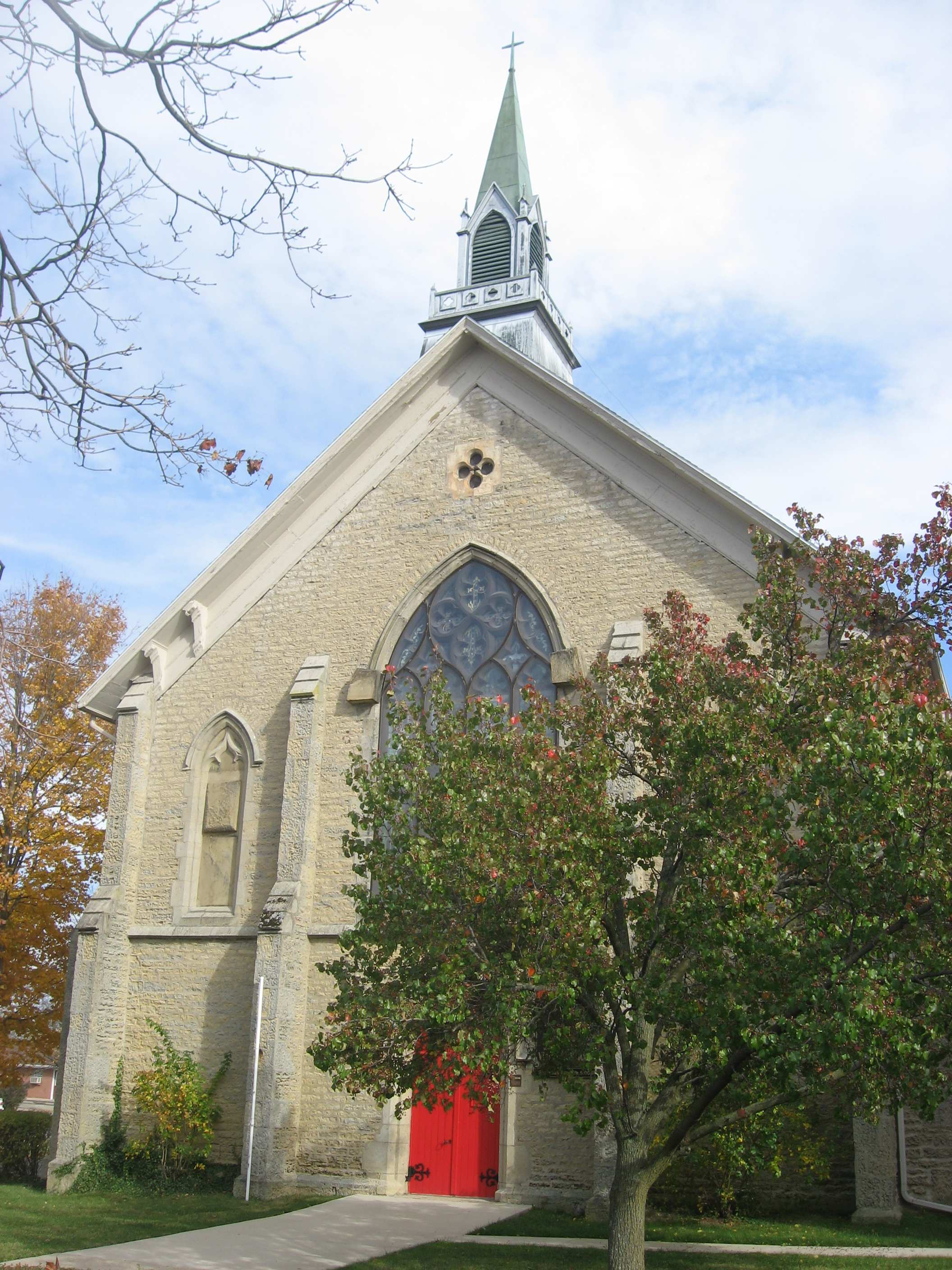
- Front of the church

- Location within Ohio Location within the United States
- Location: 232 N. High St., Hillsboro, Ohio
- Coordinates: 39°12′16″N 83°36′38″W
- Area: Less than 1 acre (0.40 ha)
- Built: 1854
- Architect: John R. Hamilton; Charles Henning and the Shinn Brothers
- Architectural style: Gothic Revival
- NRHP reference No.: 88001421
- Added to NRHP: September 8, 1988

St. Mary's Episcopal Church is a historic Episcopalian parish in the city of Hillsboro, Ohio, United States. Constructed during the middle of the 19th century, this Gothic Revival church building has been named a historic site.

St. Mary's considers its history to have begun in 1851, when occasional Episcopalian services were conducted in the Highland County Courthouse. The first priest, Noah Schenck, came two years later, after Bishop McIlvaine directed him to spend half of his Sundays with St. Mary's and half with a parish in Troy. In 1854, the parish began construction of its church building after hiring Cincinnati architect John R. Hamilton, and the Hillsboro contractors Henning and Shinn completed construction in the following year. Thirty years later, the building was improved by the installation of a large pipe organ with 1,600 pipes.

Built on a foundation of limestone and covered with an asphalt roof, the church has substantial components of wood and glass. A small tower sits atop the building's large gable front, much of which consists of a large stained glass window above the main entrance. Its buttressed limestone walls set it apart from all other churches in the city, as no other limestone churches were built in Hillsboro in the nineteenth century. Lit by six ogive-arch windows, the interior features oaken pews installed at the time of construction, a lofty vaulted ceiling, and wainscoting made of marble.

In 1988, St. Mary's Church and its rectory were together listed on the National Register of Historic Places, qualifying because of their distinctive historic architecture. The combined property is one of more than thirty current and former Episcopal churches on the Register in Ohio, and one of twenty-six Register-listed properties in Highland County.

The parish is part of the Diocese of Southern Ohio. In 2017, the church reported 118 members; in 2023, it reported 49 members. No membership statistics were reported in 2024 national parochial reports. Plate and pledge financial support reported by the church in 2023 was $26,215. Average Sunday Attendance (ASA) reported in 2024 was 19 persons. This was a relative decrease on ASA of 48 in 2015.
