= John Boles Watson =

English theatre architect

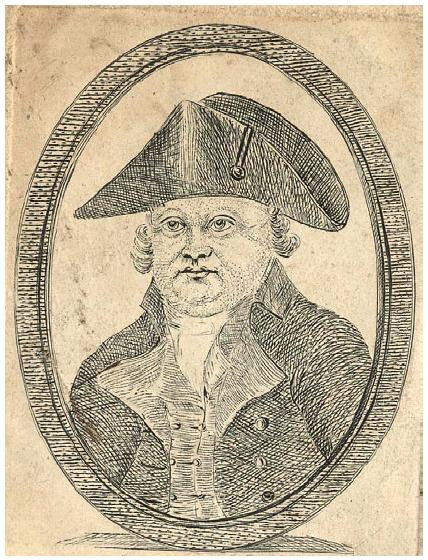
John Boles Watson, c. 1800

John Boles Watson (c. 1748 – 1813 Cheltenham) built the first permanent theatre in Cheltenham at York Passage, 1782. Boles Watson also built the Theatre Royal, Gloucester, in 1791 and was closely associated with the Cirencester theatre.
