= Warrulan =

Aboriginal Australian who worked in Birmingham, England (died 1855)

- Born: c. 1835; South Australia
- Died: 23 October 1855; Birmingham
- Resting place: Warstone Lane Cemetery
- Education: Sibford School
- Occupation: Saddler
- Father: Tenberry

Warrulan (sometimes written Warruloong or Warru-loong; known in England as Edward Warrulan; c. 1835–1855) was an Aboriginal Australian, who migrated to England as a boy. He was educated in agriculture and found work as a saddlemaker, dying as a young man before his hoped-for return to his homeland.

== Early life ==
Warrulan was the son of Tenberry, the leader of a group of Ngaiawang people from Moorundie on the Murray River, in what was the British colony of South Australia. His birthdate is not recorded, but he was said to be aged about ten in late 1845.

== Migration ==
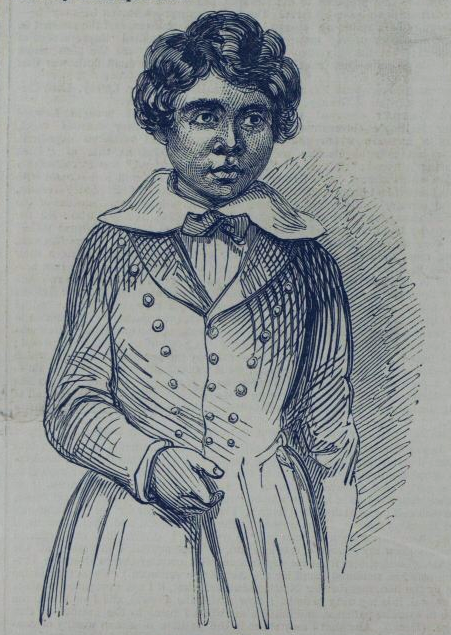
Illustration of an "Australian Boy"; from the article "Aborigines of South Australia" in The Illustrated London News, 14 February 1846. It is not stated whether the boy depicted is Warrulan or Pangkerin.

At the suggestion of Edward John Eyre, Warrulan and another Aboriginal boy, whose name and details are not recorded, were brought to England, Warrulan having been placed into Eyre's care by his parents. They boarded the Symmetry at Port Adelaide on 16 December 1844. Tenberry and up to 200 other Aboriginal people journeyed from their homeland to the Port to view the ship and say farewell to Warrulan. Also making the voyage was a third aboriginal boy, an orphan named variously as Kour or Pangkerin, in the care of Anthony Forster, along with Eyre's collection of birds, including a live Emu. The ship sailed, via Cape Town, under Captain Elder. Upon reaching England, the Symmetry called first at Deal, Kent on 11 May 1845, before anchoring at London on 12 May.

Warrulan and Pangkerin were presented to Queen Victoria and Prince Albert, at Buckingham Palace, by the then Secretary of State for War and the Colonies, William Gladstone, on 26 January 1846. The encounter was the subject of an article, "Aborigines of South Australia", in The Illustrated London News.

== Education and work ==
When Eyre was appointed Assistant-Governor of New Zealand, the physician, social reformer and prominent Quaker, Thomas Hodgkin was appointed as Warrulan's guardian.

Warrulan moved from London to Banbury in 1847, and was educated, not least in agriculture, and in Christian scripture, at Sibford School, a boarding school for the children of Quaker families, at which he was enrolled on 2 August 1847.

He proved unsuited to farming, and his educators sought other outlets for his talents, including carpentry, that would allow him to find gainful employment on his return to Australia, eventually settling on saddle-making, and from February 1852 he was apprenticed to Thomas Dumbleton, of Banbury. He left Dumbleton's care on 17 March 1855, and moved to Birmingham to take up a position in the employ of J. Middlemore.

== Death ==
In the middle of September 1855, Warrulan fell ill. He was tended by the Birmingham surgeon Edwin Chesshire, with Hodgkin visiting to confer on treatment, but died at Birmingham of pneumonia on 23 October 1855. He was buried at what is now known as Warstone Lane Cemetery in Birmingham, then reserved for members of the Church of England, in an unmarked public grave, on 27 October.

An obituary, with contributions from Warrulan's friends, and from Richard Routh, his head teacher at Sibford, was published in Aborigines' Friend and the Colonial Intelligencer, the journal of the Aborigines' Protection Society. It noted his Christian beliefs and his wishes to introduce his new faith to his family in Australia, to which he had expressed a desire to return.

Warrulan's father Tenberry, an older brother, and various uncles and cousins closely predeceased him. News of their deaths arrived during his final illness, and was kept from him by his friends.

== Commemoration ==
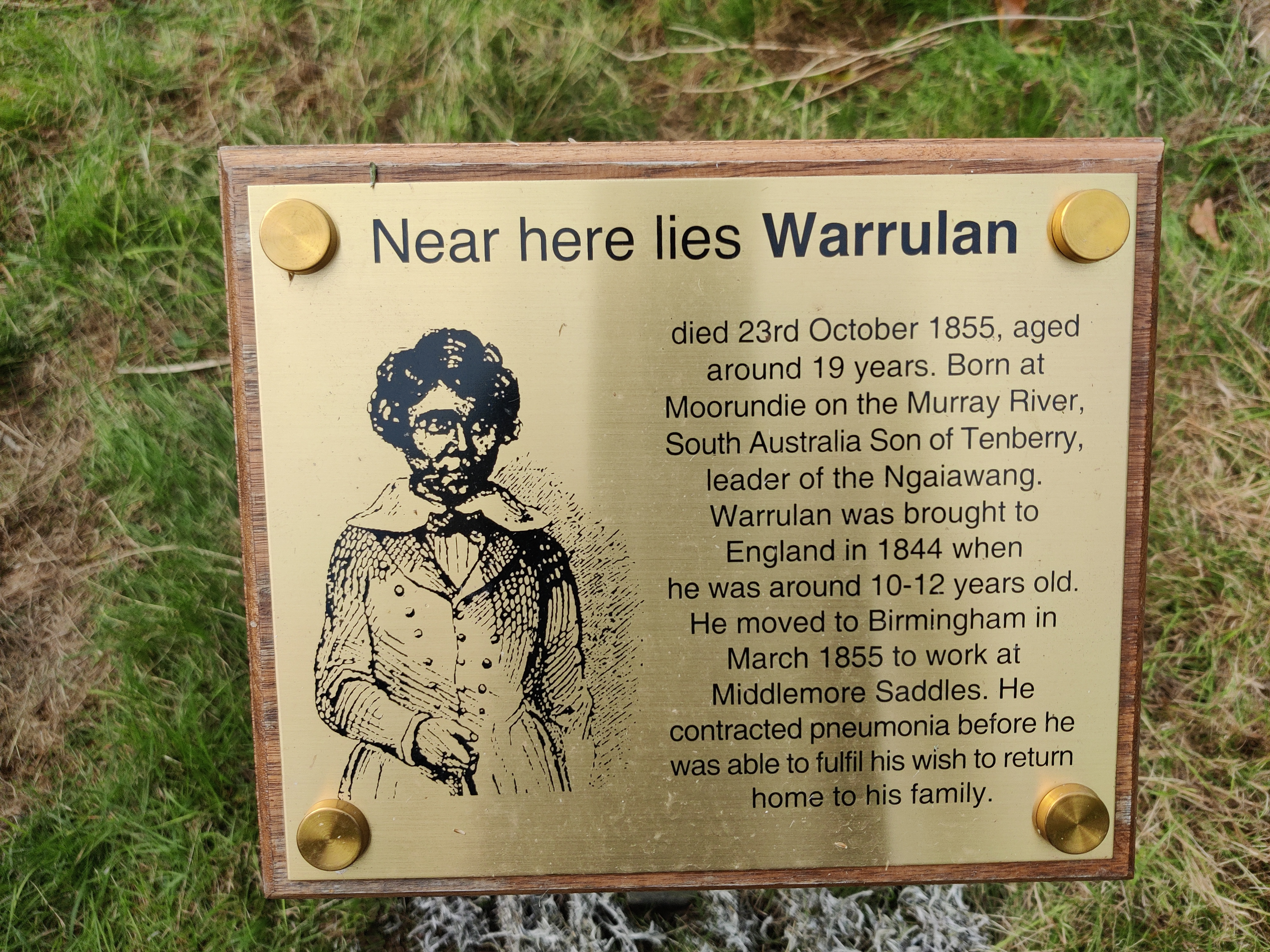
Grave marker

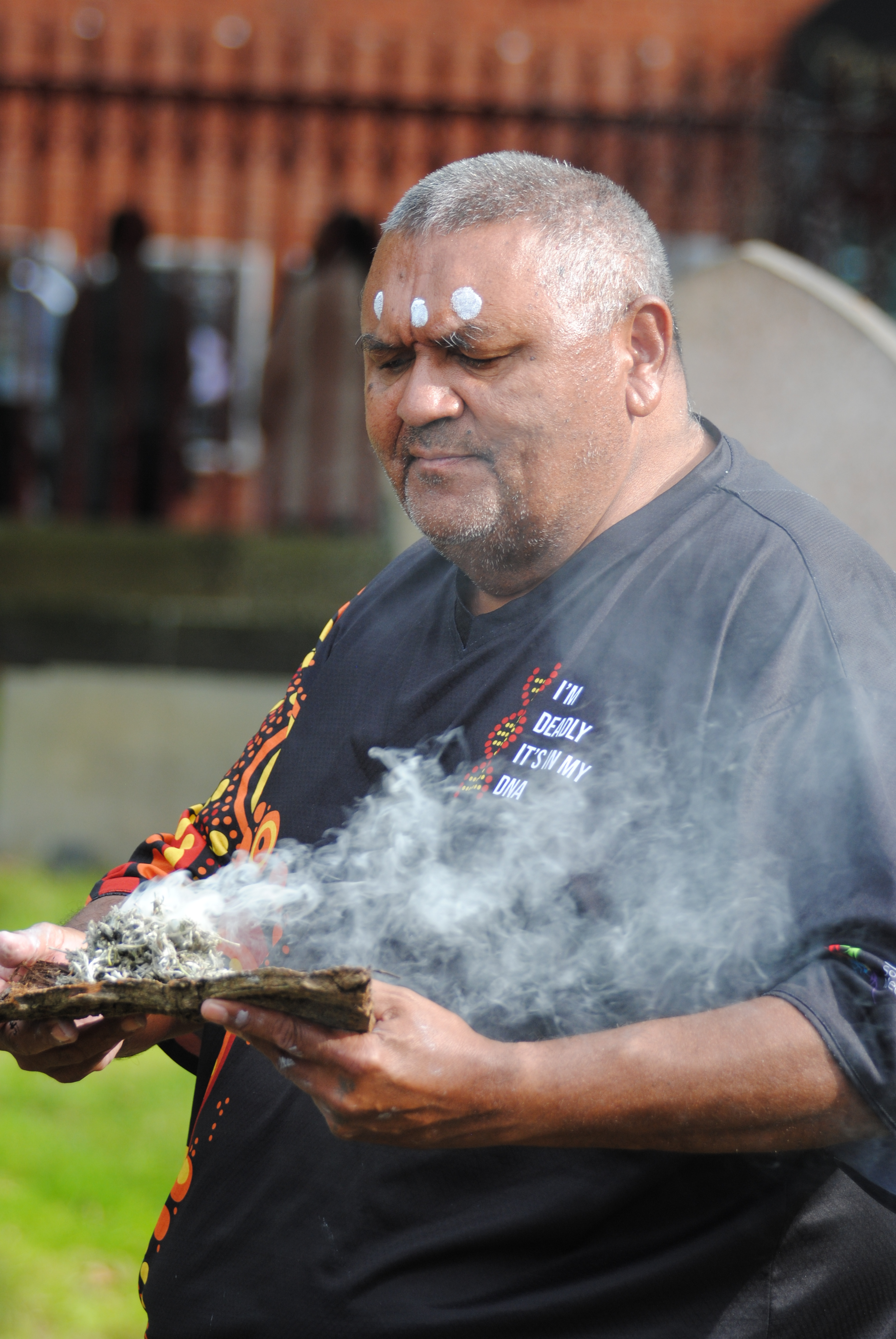
Ngarrindjeri elder Mark Koolmatrie performing a traditional ceremony for Warrulan, using smoke from burning bunches of native South Australian Rosemary

In around 2023, a brass marker was erected near the site of Warrulan's grave. On 7 October 2023, Mark Koolmatrie, an elder of the Ngarrindjeri people, visited Warstone Lane Cemetery to perform a traditional ceremony "to take Warrulan's spirit back home to the Murray River".
