= Thomas Blinkhorn =

Canadian pioneer (1806–1856)

Thomas Blinkhorn (May 3, 1806 – October 13, 1856) was a pioneer farmer on Vancouver Island, today part of British Columbia.

Thomas Blinkhorn Jr. was born in Sawtry, Huntingdonshire, to Thomas Blinkhorn Sr. and Ann Blinkhorn (née: Waldock). He had the following siblings: Sarah (1808–1842), Anne (1809–1829), John (1811–1841), Elizabeth (1813–1820), Eliza (1814 or 1816 – after 1841), Martha (1817–1852), and William (1819–1820 or 1821). Ann Waldock Blinkhorn died at her home in Sawtry, in 1820, and in 1821 Thomas Blinkhorn Sr. married Ann Hudson (1795–1828). They had four children: Elizabeth (1822–1841), Mary (1824–1843), William (about 1825–1913), and Naomi (1826–1826). Some historians have mistaken these two step-sisters and step-brother for Thomas Blinkhorn Jr.'s own children.

Thomas Blinkhorn Jr. became a farmer, although he was also known as a miller, like his father and grandfather, and later worked as a stage-coach driver. On August 9, 1827, Thomas married Ann Beeton, age 23 (1804–1884), a daughter of Thomas Beeton of Great Gidding, Huntingdonshire and Ann Coles. They were married by banns in Great Gidding church, Huntingdonshire. The marriage was witnessed by his brother John and their mother, Ann Waldock Blinkhorn. It is possible that Thomas Sr. didn't witness the marriage because he was ill: he made a will two weeks later. Thomas Jr. was 21, and his brother John was only 15, when their father died, on Wednesday, February 20, 1828, in Sawtry at the age of 50. He left behind his widow Ann and nine surviving children. (Huntingdon, Bedford, and Peterborough Gazette and Independent Press, March 1, 1828)

Thomas Beeton died in 1814 and his wife, Ann Beeton (nee Coles) married William Cheney ten years later. Ann Beeton Blinkhorn's uncle died and left her an inheritance, but William Cheney, presumably the executor of the will, withheld payment. He agreed to pay Thomas £89 upon Thomas' marriage to Ann but failed to do so. As compensation, on the night of May 13, 1836, or early the next morning, Thomas Blinkhorn stole a gelding from William Cheney's Lutton farmyard. (Thomas Robinson’s appeal letter p. 1, The National Archives, HO17-110-00903) He took the horse to the True Blue public house in Cambridge, and left it in the stable there. The next day, William Cheney's son (Martha's father and Thomas' brother-in-law), James encountered Blinkhorn in Chatteris—where he was living at the time—and enlisted him in the search for the horse. They ended up in Cambridge, and when they reached the True Blue, Thomas told James to walk on while he talked to an old man he knew who could give him some information. He then went into the stable and, perhaps in an attempt at disguise, cut off the horse's tail. He told James that the old man was not home and they returned to Chatteris. Later, Mr. John See, the owner of the True Blue, who knew Thomas well, informed James Cheney and p.c. Thomas Stearn who had committed the crime and where the horse had been left. See then apprehended Thomas Jr. and handed him over to Stearn. (Cambridge Chronicle & Journal, Friday, 20 May, 1836)

Blinkhorn underwent an examination before the magistrates on May 18, and on May 26 was taken to Thrapston in Northamptonshire (approx. 35 km, 22 mi southwest of Chatteris) where he was committed to trial by Mr. Yorke, the magistrate. In Northampton Q.S. (Queen's Sergeant) on June 30, 1836 at age 30, Thomas was convicted of stealing the horse and sentenced to transportation for life. (England and Wales Criminal Register of 1836, Northampton Criminal Assizes Register, The National Archives, HO27-52, page 68) Only six years earlier he would have been hanged for the crime. Several appeals were mounted on his behalf, and they included petitions with hundreds of signatures of Thomas' friends and neighbors--even William Cheney, the horse-owner. On September 10, 1836 Samuel March Phillipps, Under Secretary for the Home Department, under Lord John Russell, Secretary of State, wrote to solicitor George Game Day informing him that “under all the circumstances of the case” it was warranted to reduce Thomas’ sentence to transportation for seven years. (Letter from S.M. Phillips to G.G. Day, 10 Sep 1836, The National Archives HCO13-70-63) A note was also sent to solicitor Thomas Robinson. (S.M. Phillips note to T. Robinson, September 10, 1836, The National Archives, England & Wales, Crime, Prisons & Punishment, 1770-1935 CCC-HO17 110 00910)

It was customary for prisoners under sentence of transportation to spend the first part of their sentence in the prison where they had awaited trial, usually in solitary confinement. Thomas spent almost an entire year as a prisoner aboard two "hulk" prison ships, waiting to be transported: first the Leviathan moored in Portsmouth Harbour, and later the Antelope. (Leviathan convict list, page 38, 30 September 1836, TNA CCC HO8-049-38, Leviathan convict list, page 28, 31 December 1836, TNA HO8_050_28, Leviathan convict list, page 18, 31 March 1837, TNA HCO8-51-18, Antelope convict list, page 142, 30 June 1837, TNA HO52-8-142, Leviathan convict list, page 8, 30 September 1837, TNA HCO8-53-8) Blinkhorn’s behavior on board the hulks was noted as "good" in the Con 31 Convict Register. (Founders and Survivors online database of Tasmania, CON31-1-3,400,188)

Thomas was finally transported to Van Diemen's Land (Tasmania) on August 5, 1837 out of Spithead aboard the ship Susan. The Ship Master was Henry Neatby and the ship surgeon was Edward Hilditch. The voyage lasted 108 days: 300 persons embarked, 1 re-landed, 6 died en route, and 293 were landed safely in Van Diemen's Land. The Surgeon's Report said that Thomas was “well behaved on Board". The Con18 Description List of Male Convicts puts Thomas' height at 5 feet 3 inches (1.60 m). His complexion was "fresh", his head and face "round", his hair dark brown, his forehead "high", his eyes grey and his nose small. It was noted that he had "2 moles" at the side of his cheek.

The Susan disembarked in Hobart on November 5, 1837. Thomas was convict number 2722 when he arrived in Van Diemen's Land, but was later number 5511. He was held at Longford Gaol (Prison) for just over three years. The prison report notes "character and connexions very respectable." Despite this, he was at one point sentenced to "Six hours of Stocks" for disobeying orders. In February 1840, Thomas was appropriated by Lieutenant Ritchie and moved to Ritchie's Scone estate in Perth, about 20 km (12 mi) south of Launceston. (Blinkhorn Appropriation List entry, November 1837, CON27-1-7, image 94) Scone featured four water-powered flour mills.

On February 6, 1840 Thomas was found guilty of misconduct for making a "malicious and unfounded" complaint about his "master", presumably Ritchie, and sentenced to "6 months hard labor out of chains." However, only one week later, on February 14, 1840 he was returned to Scone "by order of Lieutenant Governor" Sir John Franklin. (Tasmanian Archive and Heritage Office, CON31-1-3, Image 188) Why Franklin intervened is unknown.

In late April, or early May 1842 Thomas was likely involved in the search party of convicts that was sent out from the Launceston area to look for Governor and Lady Franklin when they became lost in the bush during an overland expedition. Unbeknownst to the searchers, the Franklins' ultimately found their way to Macquarie Harbour and safety on board the government schooner Breeze. After a long wait for safe weather, the Breeze met up with the rescue ship Eliza, to which the Franklin's transferred for the trip back to Hobart. These events provided the basis of a story of Thomas Blinkhorn "rescuing" Sir John Franklin was first recorded by Captain John T. Walbran in his book, British Columbia Coast Names 1592-1906, p. 56, Vancouver Public Library, 1971, p. 56. This story was later cited by Victoria, British Columbia newspaperman J.K. Nesbitt in his Introduction to Martha Beeton Cheney's diary. (The British Columbia Historical Quarterly, April 1949, Vol XIII No. 2, The Diary of Martha Cheney Ella Part I. September 16, 1853 to March 31, 1854, p. 91 and July-Oct. Vol XIII Nos. 3 & 4, Part II. January 1, 1855, to November 25, 1856, published by the Archives of British Columbia) Walbran also claimed that, during a sojourn in the Victoria area between February 22, 1861 and March 24, 1861, Lady Jane Franklin visited Mrs. Blinkhorn at her home on the corner of Yates and Broad Streets, in thankful acknowledgement of Thomas' rescuing her husband, although no corroborating record of the visit has been located.

Thomas lost several family members while he was serving his sentence in Van Diemen's Land: his sister Sarah, wife of George Cooper Sr., died in England 1842, and his sister Mary died in 1843. Thomas sued the insolvent Alexander Anderson, (a farmer located in Thorpe, near Bothwell, just north of Hobart), for debts in Aug. 1843. (Launceston Examiner, Wednesday August 9, 1843) Convicts could obtain permission from the local authorities to seek employment while serving their sentence.

After being punished a second time for misconduct in May 1843, Thomas Jr. was released on October 30. He had served only six years of his seven-year sentence, not counting his time aboard the prison hulk and the Susan.

Thomas Blinkhorn did not apply for his Certificate of Freedom until 1845. Thomas did not return to England until 1849. He may have spent time on sheep ranches in Tasmania or Australia during the intervening years, raising money to pay for the trip home.

Sometime in 1850, young Captain James Cooper convinced Thomas Blinkhorn Jr. to join him in a farming venture in the Pacific colony on the southern tip of what was then known as Vancouver's Island. Cooper's father, George Cooper Sr., had married Thomas Blinkhorn's sister Sarah in 1831. The Hudson's Bay Company had been advertising settlement opportunities in England in an attempt to expand the Fort Victoria colony, which was a condition of their lease to the land from the Crown. The business partnership struck between Blinkhorn and Cooper would see Blinkhorn develop and act as superintendent of farm land that Cooper intended to purchase from the HBC.

James, his 22-year-old German wife, their four children (Elizabeth Emma, Thomas, Henrietta, and Charles Villiers), along with the Blinkhorn's and Mrs. Blinkhorn's 15-year-old niece, Martha Beeton Cheney (1835–1911), and Captain Edward Langford and his wife Flora (as well as their bull mastiff and a goat), embarked from London for Fort Victoria aboard the sailing barque Tory in late November, 1850. Martha kept a diary of the voyage which, unfortunately, has since been lost. The voyage had its share of trials: severe gales in the Bay of Biscay, scarcity and spoilage of food and water, and storms off the River de la Plata, Rounding the Horn, the ship was driven so far south by fierce winds—almost to the Arctic Circle—that the sails froze. The Tory finally arrived at Vancouver's Island on May 10 and anchored off Royal Roads. She was greeted by First Nations paddlers in canoes. For the next two years, the Blinkhorn's and Martha Cheney lived with the Reverend Robert Staines and his family in the drafty, two-storey building that served as his residence and school, on the south-east side of the fort.

Captain Cooper finally gave the HBC a down payment on Lot 1, a 385-acre (156 ha) plot of land in Metchosin, on the overland route from Sooke to the fort, and in the spring of 1853, the Blinkhorn's moved there and Thomas took up his job as superintendent of Bilston Farm. It was a nine-mile paddle or sail, and a fifteen-mile walk or ride along a trail through the forest to the farm. Thomas Blinkhorn ultimately brought sixty acres under cultivation and established a dairy herd. Sandwich Islanders, called Kanakas, were employed to clear the land. Most of the other farm labourers were brought over from England. Blinkhorn also managed William Fraser Tolmie's farm at Cloverdale, fifteen miles away.

In March 1853, seemingly unaware of Thomas' convict past, or out of desperation, Governor Douglas sent Thomas Blinkhorn a letter appointing him Magistrate and Justice of the Peace for the District of Metchosin. (BC Archives, EB B 62 3, M 665) Douglas considered Blinkhorn the only independent settler with a sufficient degree of education to qualify for the office. Three HBC farm superintendents also received appointments. This new responsibility required Thomas to journey to the Fort for the monthly Court of Petty Sessions.

Martha Cheney kept a diary of her life at Bilston farm. The earlier surviving portion, which she titled The Second Volume” (perhaps because she considered the now lost voyage diary the First Volume), covers the period from September 16, 1853 to March 31, 1854. The second portion covers January 1, 1855 to November 25, 1856. (Martha Beeton Cheney’s diary, BC Archives, Martha Ella fonds PR-1542, E/B/El5)

Visitors to the farm included the Muir family, Captain Grant, the Langfords and their daughters, Dr. Helmcken, and Governor James Douglas and his family. The Muir family homestead, Woodside Farm, was farther to the west, in Sooke. Many of these were present on July 19, 1855 when Martha married Captain Henry Bailey Ella. (Martha Ella’s diary entry, July 19, 1855, BC Archives E/B/ El519) The couple had obtained a special license to be married from Governor Douglas. (Ella-Cheney special marriage license, May 31, 1855, BC Archives)

In her diary entry for September 5, 1856, Martha notes that Thomas Blinkhorn Jr. and his wife Ann returned from a trip to the fort, but her uncle was "not at all well." The illness lingered, and on September 12 she "found Uncle very ill," when she got home from a visit to the Skinner's residence. Thomas' condition remained poor, so on September 26 a Dr. Beaumont was summoned and he stayed the night at Bilston Farm. He visited again on October 3. Sadly, Martha later reports that on the night of October 13, her uncle “went to bed at his usual time no worse, and he had a good sleep, and awoke coughing and it Broke a Blood vessel and he was suffocated.” He was 50. He was buried in the Quadra Street Cemetery, but the original headstone no longer exists there. A second marker is now located in the Ross Bay Cemetery.

In an address to the Select Committee on the Hudson's Bay Company in 1857, the Honorable Charles William Wentworth Fitzwilliam described Thomas Blinkhorn Jr. as "by far the most energetic settler on the island." The industrious Thomas Blinkhorn is remembered through his name on various geographical features: Mount Blinkhorn, Blinkhorn Lake, and Blinkhorn Island (Peninsula), named by Captain George Henry Richards in 1861.
