= Robert Blinkhorn =

Gloucester businessman (1814-1888)

- Born: 1814; Maidstone, Kent
- Died: 31 October 1888 (aged 73–74)
- Occupations: businessman and local political

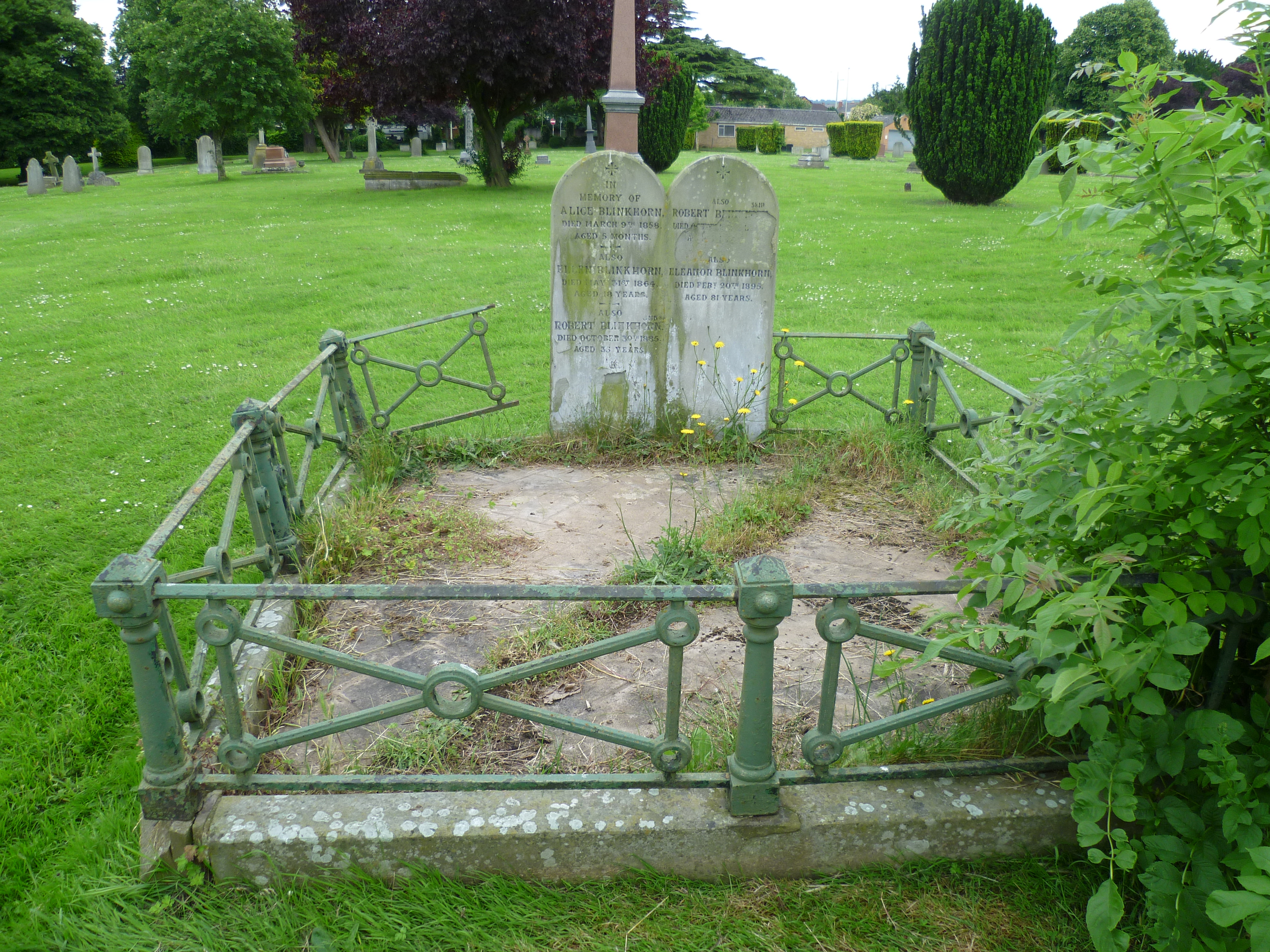
The Blinkhorn family grave at Tredworth Road Cemetery, Gloucester.

Robert Blinkhorn (c. 1814 – 31 October 1888) was a Gloucester businessman and local political figure.

== Career ==
Robert and his wife Eleanor were both born in Maidstone, Kent and moved to Gloucester later. He established the Blinkhorns drapery store in Gloucester's Eastgate Street in 1843 which grew to be an important local business but eventually ceased trading in 1953 on its sale to F. W. Woolworth & Co. He was a director of the Gloucester Railway Carriage and Wagon Company at the time of his death and an Alderman of the City of Gloucester.

== Death ==
Robert Blinkorn died on 31 October 1888. He is buried at Tredworth Road Cemetery in the same plot as his wife Eleanor (died 20 February 1895) and three younger Blinkhorns, Alice, Ellen and Robert.

== See also ==
- John Blinkhorn
