= John Blinkhorn =

Gloucester businessman (1808-1897)

- Born: 1808
- Died: 15 June 1897; Greyfriars area of Gloucester
- Occupation: businessman

John Blinkhorn (c.1808 – 15 June 1897) was a Gloucester businessman who in 1857 purchased the Theatre Royal at Gloucester, at which Charles Dickens once performed. At its centenary in 1891, Sir Henry Irving and Ellen Terry both appeared with members of the Lyceum Company. In 1902 the theatre was sold again to Charles Poole who changed it to a variety theatre and picture house.

John was in partnership with William Blinkhorn as Builders and Railroad Contractors but the partnership was dissolved in 1847.

He died 15 June 1897 at his home in the Greyfriars area of Gloucester, he was 88.

== See also ==
- Robert Blinkhorn
