= Coney Hill Cemetery and Crematorium =

Cemetery and Cremarorium in Gloucester, England

Coney Hill Crematorium
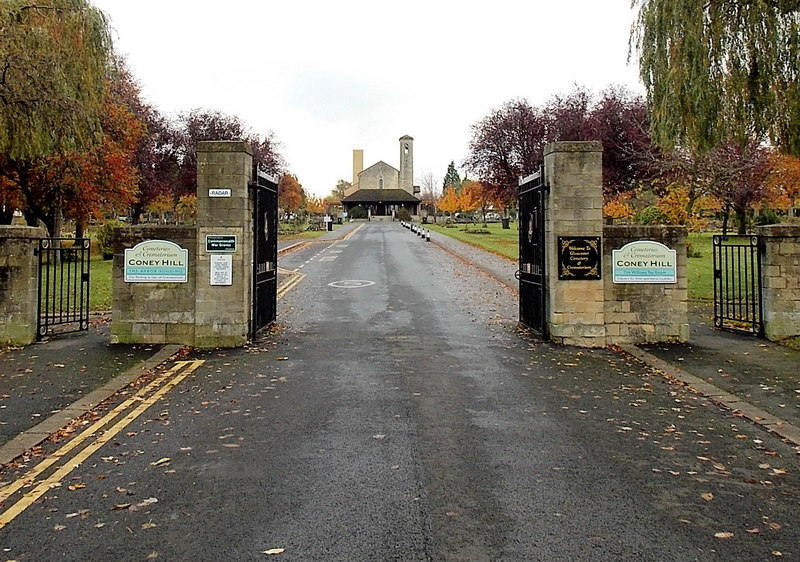
- Entrance to Coney Hill Cemetery & Crematorium, Gloucester
- Interactive map of Coney Hill Crematorium

Details
- Established: 1935; 91 years ago
- Location: Gloucester, Gloucestershire
- Country: England
- Coordinates: 51°51′16″N 2°13′08″W
- Owned by: Gloucester City Council
- Website: Cemetery & Crematorium Services
- Find a Grave: Coney Hill Crematorium

Coney Hill Crematorium, sometimes known as Coney Hill Crem, is a cemetery and Crematorium in Gloucester, England, that is run by Gloucester City Council. In addition, it contains 8 war graves maintained by the Commonwealth War Graves Commission and the cemetery chapel was previously recorded as Grade listed by Historic England in 1935.

== Location ==
The crematorium is located off Eastern Avenue and situated on Coney Hill Road in Coney Hill, Gloucester.

== History ==
Coney Hill Crematorium was built as a cemetery chapel in 1935 in the early Christian style building and was designed by Petter and Warren, it was originally completed in 1935 as a church by firm Potter and Hare and in 1953, it was converted to a crematorium by Gloucester City Architect Albert Norman and Roger Fitzsimmons.

In 1999, the crematorium expanded its land and in 2001, the cemetery created a Millennium Section, which created sections for the Muslim and Chinese communities, Roman Catholics and members of the Church of England as well as a children's plot and a General (Non-denominational) ground. They have also created a Woodland Burial site for ‘green burials’.

In August 2010, the crematorium improved the crematorium facilities with the addition of new roads, more parking, a tearoom, covered walkway and a new memorial garden. The work also includes the installation of special burner filters to cut down on mercury emissions.

== Chapel ==
The crematorium chapel, is stone built with round-arched single light windows and a three bay narthex to the west and a tall southwest tower. In 1953, the conversion to a crematorium was carried out by the architects Albert Norman and Roger Fitzsimmons, for Gloucester District Council. Pevsner describes it as ‘neo-Norman and it was built prior to the Grade II listed St Oswald's Church which has a similar tower.

== The Arbor ==
Within the grounds, there is also a tea room called The Arbor where families can stop to have food and drink after a service at the Chapel in the Mulberry and The Willows tea rooms.

== War graves ==
The cemetery contains burials from World War II, eight war graves maintained by the Commonwealth War Graves Commission. The eight burials are from the Royal Air Force Volunteer Reserve, the Gloucestershire Regiment and the Royal Engineers.
