= Fred Blinkhorn =

English footballer

Personal information
- Full name: Frederick Blinkhorn
- Date of birth: 2 August 1901
- Place of birth: Bolton, England
- Date of death: 1983 (aged 81–82)
- Position: Full back

Senior career*
| Years | Team | Apps | (Gls) |
- Horwich RMI
| 1925–1927 | Burnley | 15 | (0) |
- * Club domestic league appearances and goals

Frederick Blinkhorn (2 August 1901 – 1983) was an English professional footballer who played as a full back in the Football League for Burnley.
