= Łączki Brzeskie =

- Village
- Location within Poland
- Coordinates: 50°11′N 21°23′E
- Country: Poland
- Voivodeship: Subcarpathian
- County: Mielec
- Gmina: Przecław

Łączki Brzeskie [ˈwɔnt͡ʂki ˈbʐɛskʲɛ] is a village in the administrative district of Gmina Przecław, within Mielec County, Subcarpathian Voivodeship, in south-eastern Poland.
