= Coney Hill Hospital =

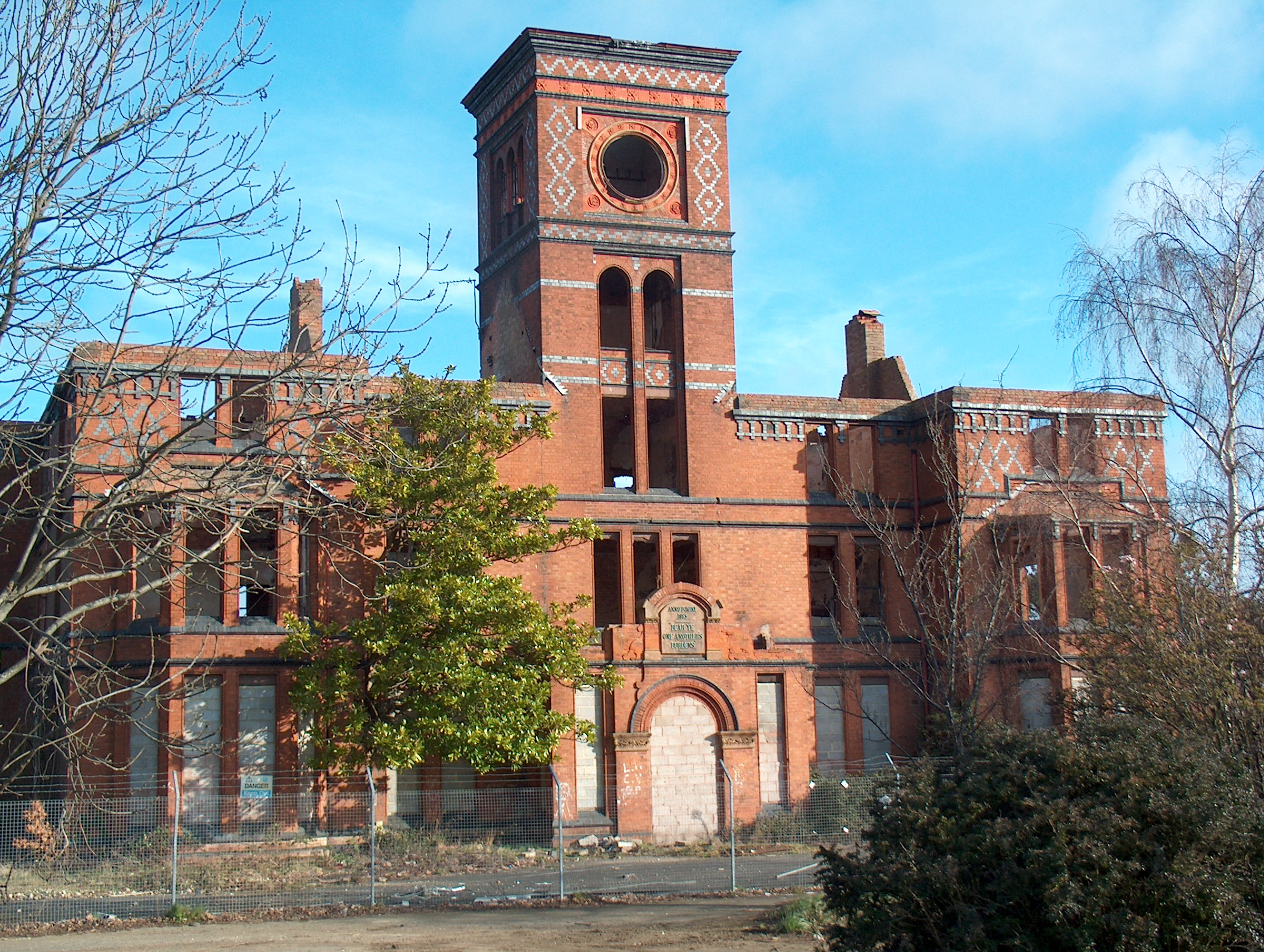
- Former administration block at Coney Hill Hospital in 2005 before residential conversion

- Shown in Gloucestershire

Geography
- Location: Gloucester, Gloucestershire, England
- Coordinates: 51.8486°N 2.2055°W

Organisation
- Care system: NHS
- Type: Specialist

Services
- Emergency department: N/A
- Speciality: Psychiatric hospital

History
- Founded: 1883
- Closed: 1994

Links
- Lists: Hospitals in England

Coney Hill Hospital (also known as Second Gloucestershire County Asylum) was a mental health facility in Gloucester, England.

== History ==
The hospital site formed part of the Barnwood Mill Estate. It was designed by John Giles & Gough and opened as the Second Gloucestershire County Asylum in 1883. It was the first asylum to be built in true echelon plan. Outer sections to the echelon were planned but never implemented. After the First World War it became the Gloucestershire County Mental Hospital and it joined the National Health Service as Coney Hill Hospital in 1948.

After the introduction of Care in the Community in the early 1980s, the hospital went into a period of decline and closed on 31 December 1994. In 1999, the hospital was largely destroyed by fire. The buildings, with the exception of the administration block, were demolished and the hospital site now forms part of the Abbeymead residential area. The administration block was converted into apartments in 2007.

== See also ==
- Barnwood House Hospital
