= James Medland =

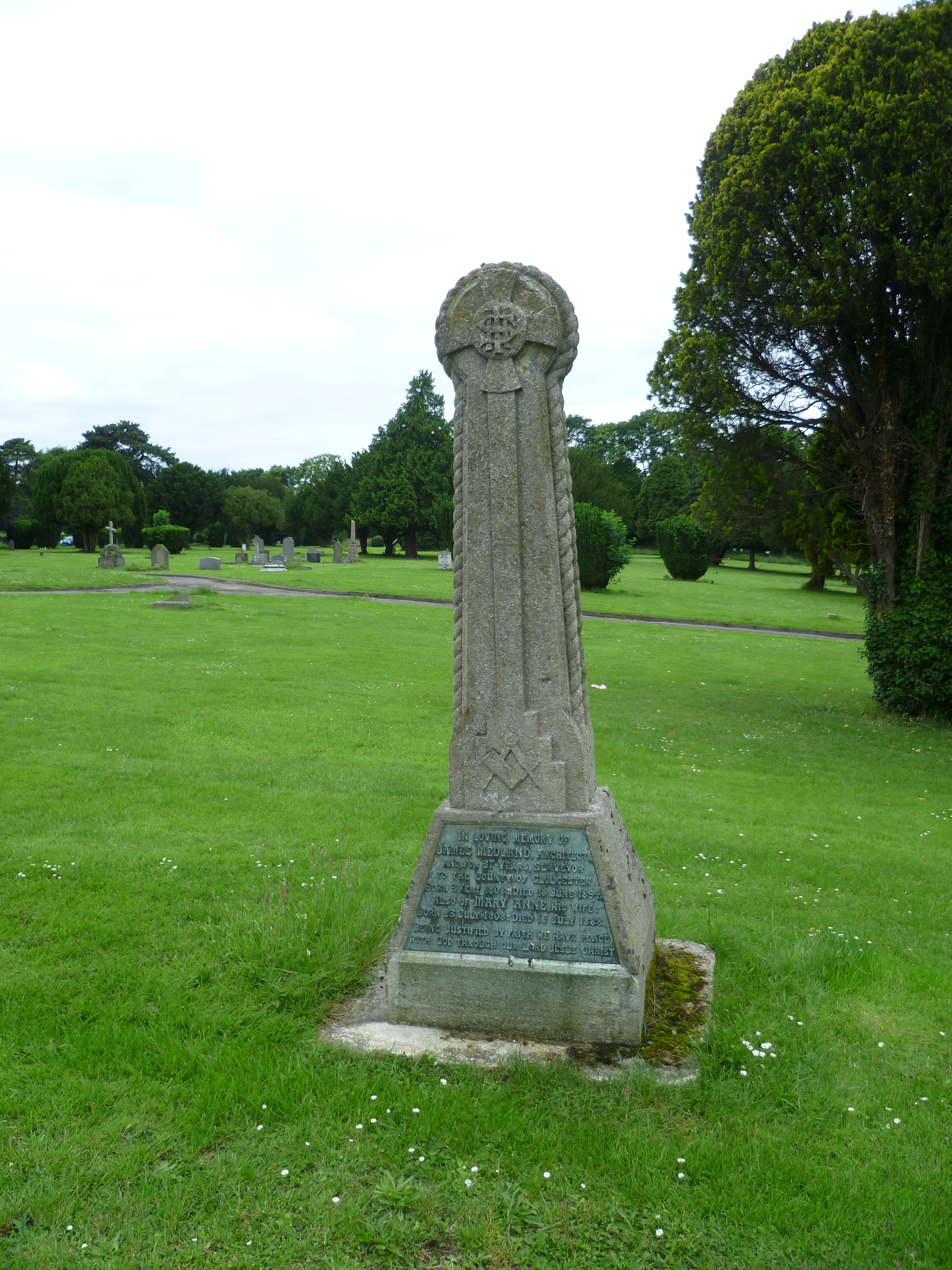
The Medland family grave at Tredworth Road Cemetery, Gloucester.

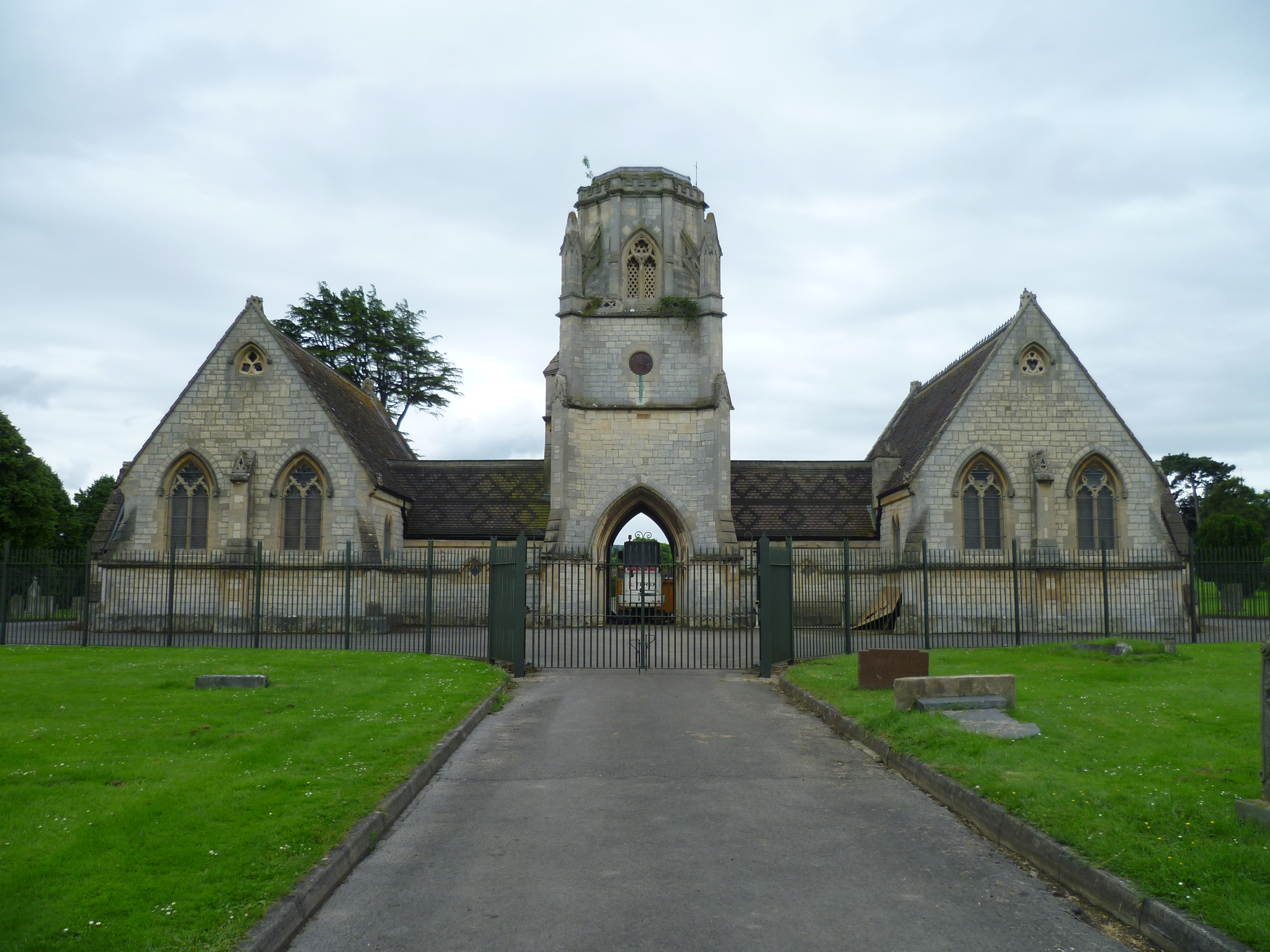
Tredworth Road Cemetery chapel by Medland and Maberly, 1857.

James Medland (3 February 1808 - 18 June 1894) was county surveyor for Gloucestershire from 1857–89 in which capacity he designed many of Gloucester's public buildings such as the grade II listed Tredworth Road Cemetery chapel (1857).

== Early life ==
James Medland was born in Newington, Surrey, on 3 February 1808 in what is now part of the London Borough of Southwark.

== Career ==
Medland was a pupil of the York architect James Pigott Pritchett. He worked in the office of Samuel Whitfield Daukes in Gloucester and after Daukes left in the late 1840s he was in partnership with J. R. Hamilton. He was in partnership with A. W. Maberly, a former pupil of Daukes, from 1854 to 1868.

Medland and Maberly designed many of Gloucester's public buildings. In 1857 they were responsible for the Gothic style chapel at Tredworth Road Cemetery, built to a symmetrical design with parallel chapels for Anglicans and Nonconformists joined by a central carriageway. It is a grade II listed building with Historic England who describe it as "a fine example of the type of linked chapels often provided in corporation cemeteries in the C19".

In 1865, they designed the new Spread Eagle hotel. In 1877, Medland designed gothic style stores for the Gloucester Co-operative and Industrial Society.

== Family ==
Medland married Mary Anne (23 Jul 1808 - 16 July 1888). They had a son John Medland and a daughter Mary A. Medland. Matthew Henry Medland (1838 - 24 October 1920), was also county surveyor of Gloucestershire.

== Death ==
Medland died on 18 June 1894 and was buried at Tredworth Road Cemetery, Gloucester, with his wife Mary Anne.
