= Little Fish =

Little Fish may refer to:

== Arts and entertainment ==
- Little Fish (2005 film), an Australian film directed by Rowan Woods
- Little Fish, Strange Pond, a 2009 American film directed by Gregory Dark
- Little Fish (2020 film), an American film directed by Chad Hartigan
- Little Fish (band), a British garage rock band
- Little Fish (musical), a 2003 musical by Michael John LaChiusa
- "Little Fishes", a 1975 song by Brian Eno from Another Green World
- Little Fish (novel), a 2018 novel by Casey Plett
- Little Fish, a character on Bubble Guppies

== Places ==
- Little Fish Bay or Baía de Namibe, Angola
- Little Fish Lake, Alberta, Canada
  - Little Fish Lake Provincial Park
- Little Fish River, a tributary of the Great Fish River in South Africa

== Other uses ==
- Benny Bass (1904–1975), nicknamed Little Fish, American boxer
- Rybička (knife) or Little Fish, a Czech pocketknife
