= Pluty =

Pluty may refer to the following places:

- Pluty, Gmina Paprotnia in Masovian Voivodeship (east-central Poland)
- Pluty, Podlaskie Voivodeship (north-east Poland)
- Pluty, Subcarpathian Voivodeship (south-east Poland)
- Pluty, Gmina Wiśniew in Masovian Voivodeship (east-central Poland)
- Pluty, Greater Poland Voivodeship (west-central Poland)
- Pluty, Warmian-Masurian Voivodeship (north Poland)
- Pluty, West Pomeranian Voivodeship (north-west Poland)
