= St. Bartholomew's Church, Staszów =

St. Bartholomew's Church
- Kościół św Bartłomieja
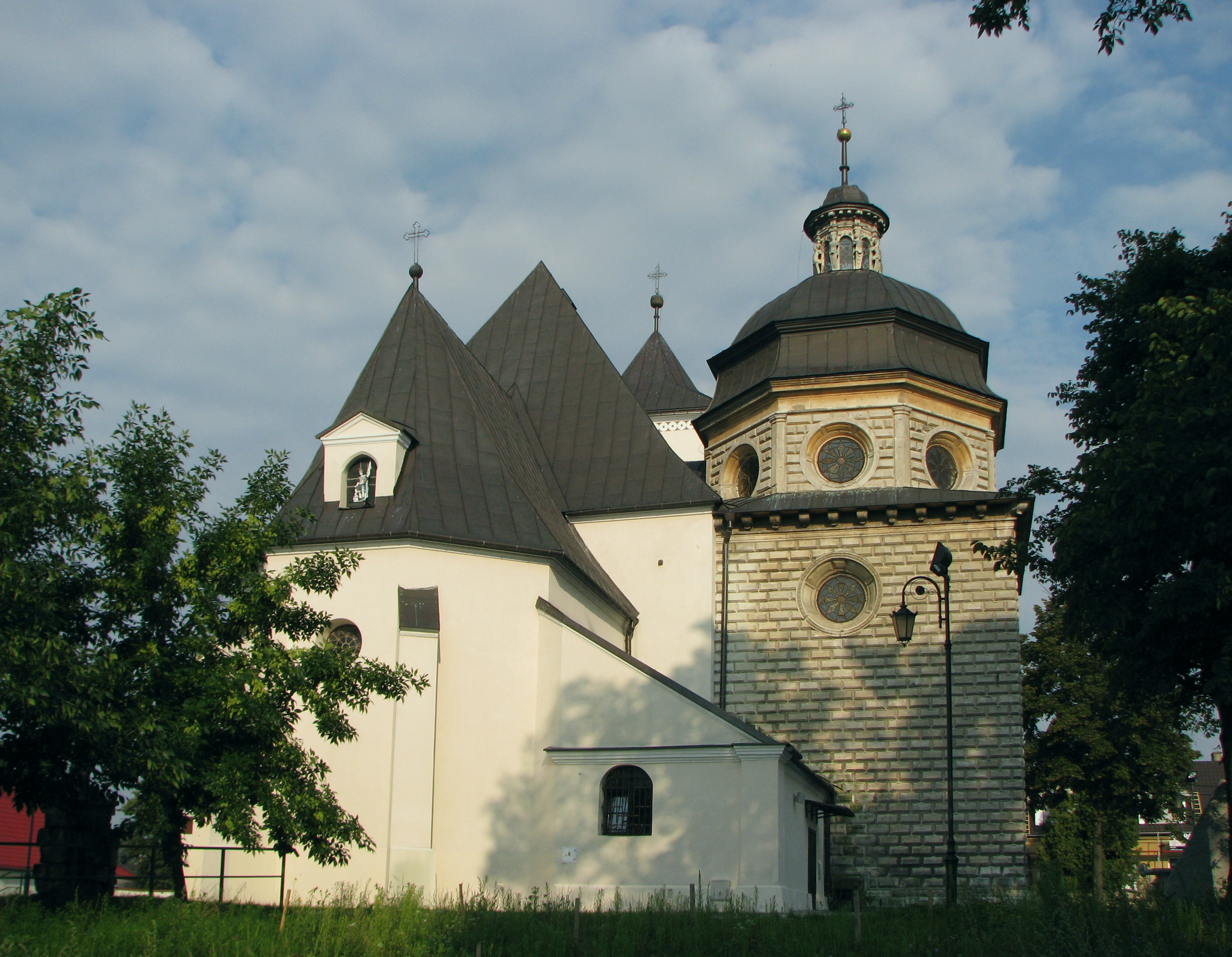
- St. Bartholomew's Church
- Denomination: Catholic

History
- Consecrated: 1345

Administration
- Diocese: Roman Catholic Diocese of Sandomierz

St. Barthlomew Church is a Catholic parish church located in Staszów, Diocese of Sandomierz. The parish received permission to build the church in 1345 from Bishop Jan Grot.

== History ==
A prior, wooden church on the site was burned by the Mongols in 1241. The new building was founded by Dorota Tarnowska, a local heiress from Rytwiany-Łęczycki voivode, and widow of Martin Tarnowska, in 1342. The church was solemnly consecrated by Bishop Grot in 1345. Another reconstruction took place in 1625. During wars and occupation, the church was repeatedly saved from destruction. It was remodeled in the seventeenth century; in 1610, a small tower was added, and in 1613 the Chapel of Our Mother of the Rosary, also known as the Chapel Tęczyńskich, was built. The interior of the church was rebuilt with the establishment of new vaults and divisions in 1625.

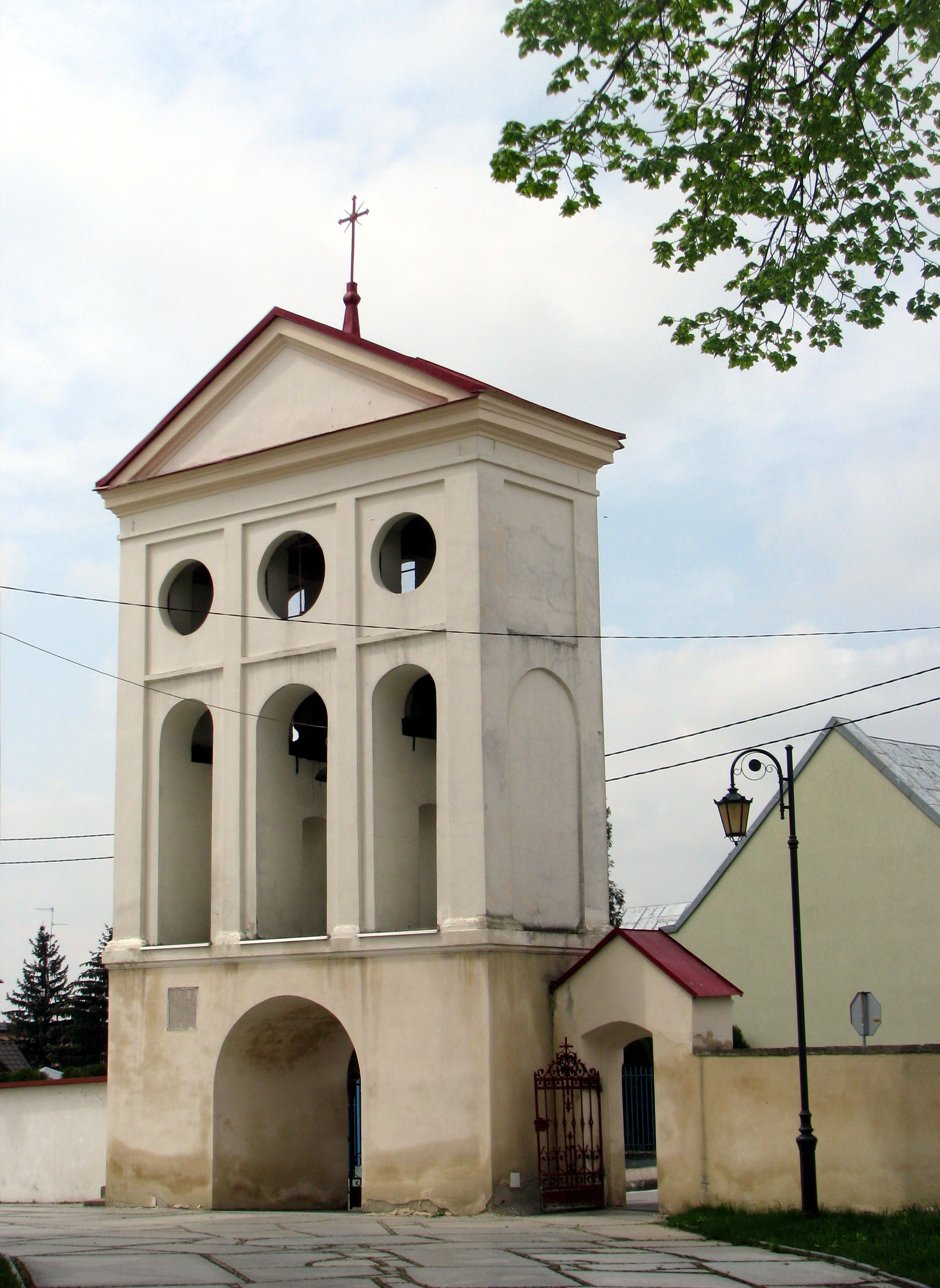
Belfry at Saint Bartholomew church in Staszów

== Building ==
The church is built in the late Gothic style, on the classic cross plan. The main altar is in late Baroque style, and features the Crucified Christ. It is a single-nave building enclosed on three sides of the chancel. The interior of the church is also late baroque, and dates to the second half of the eighteenth century. On the left side of the altar is a painting of St. Jack, on the right a painting of St. Anna done on wood. There is a unique fresco of St. Bartholomew inside the church, and a rococo pulpit covered with a canopy with statues of four evangelists. Noteworthy also is the rich stucco in the chancel, which was added in the seventeenth century. The church has a bell tower from 1825 in a classic style.
