= Pliskin =

Pliskin is a Jewish locational surname, which originally meant a person from the villages of Pliski, Belarus or Pliszki, Poland. Notable people with the surname include:

- Joseph Pliskin (born 1947), Israeli health researcher
- Zelig Pliskin (born 1946), American rabbi and writer
- Iroquois Pliskin, fictional character in the Metal Gear series
