= Kaliski =

Kaliski may refer to:

== Places ==
- Kaliski, Gmina Paprotnia, a village in Masovian Voivodeship, east-central Poland
- Kaliski, Gmina Przesmyki, a village in Masovian Voivodeship, east-central Poland
- Kaliski, Podlaskie Voivodeship, a village in north-east Poland
- Kałyški, a village in Vitebsk Region, east-central Belarus

== Surname ==
- Burt Kaliski, American cryptographer
- Chaïm Kaliski, Belgian artist and comics author
- Sylwester Kaliski (1925–1978), Polish engineer and general
