= Krynki (disambiguation) =

Krynki is a town in Podlaskie Voivodeship in north-eastern Poland.

Krynki may also refer to the following villages:

- Krynki, Masovian Voivodeship (east-central Poland)
- Krynki, Świętokrzyskie Voivodeship (south-central Poland)

== See also ==
- Krynky, a similarly named village in Ukraine.
