= Strusy =

- Village
- Location within Poland
- Coordinates: 52°16′N 22°23′E
- Country: Poland
- Voivodeship: Masovian
- County: Siedlce
- Gmina: Paprotnia

Strusy [ˈstrusɨ] is a village in the administrative district of Gmina Paprotnia, within Siedlce County, Masovian Voivodeship, in east-central Poland.
