= Chyki-Dębiaki =

- Village
- Location within Poland
- Coordinates: 50°20′N 21°32′E
- Country: Poland
- Voivodeship: Subcarpathian
- County: Mielec
- Gmina: Tuszów Narodowy

Chyki-Dębiaki (German: Reichsheim (1939–1944)) [ˈxɨki dɛmˈbjaki] is a village in the administrative district of Gmina Tuszów Narodowy, within Mielec County, Subcarpathian Voivodeship, in south-eastern Poland.
