= Trębice Dolne =

- Village
- Location within Poland
- Coordinates: 52°19′15″N 22°30′35″E
- Country: Poland
- Voivodeship: Masovian
- County: Siedlce
- Gmina: Paprotnia
- Population: 60

Trębice Dolne [trɛmˈbit͡sɛ ˈdɔlnɛ] is a village in the administrative district of Gmina Paprotnia, within Siedlce County, Masovian Voivodeship, in east-central Poland.
