= Kobylany-Kozy =

- Village
- Location within Poland
- Coordinates: 52°18′51″N 22°22′51″E
- Country: Poland
- Voivodeship: Masovian
- County: Siedlce
- Gmina: Paprotnia

Kobylany-Kozy [kɔbɨˈlanɨ ˈkɔzɨ] is a village in the administrative district of Gmina Paprotnia, within Siedlce County, Masovian Voivodeship, in east-central Poland.
