= Gmina Tuszów Narodowy =

Gmina Tuszów Narodowy Tuszów Narodowy Commune
- Gmina
- Coat of arms
- Interactive map of Gmina Tuszów Narodowy
- Coordinates (Tuszów Narodowy): 50°22′N 21°28′E
- Country: Poland
- Voivodeship: Subcarpathian
- County: Mielec
- Seat: Tuszów Narodowy

Area
  - Total: 89.51 km^{2} (34.56 sq mi)

Population (2006)
  - Total: 7,545
  - Density: 84.29/km^{2} (218.3/sq mi)
- Website: https://www.tuszownarodowy.pl

Gmina Tuszów Narodowy is a rural gmina (administrative district) in Mielec County, Subcarpathian Voivodeship, in south-eastern Poland. Its seat is the village of Tuszów Narodowy, which lies approximately 10 kilometres (6 mi) north of Mielec and 54 km (34 mi) north-west of the regional capital Rzeszów.

The gmina covers an area of 89.51 square kilometres (34.6 sq mi), and as of 2006 its total population is 7,545.

== Villages ==
Gmina Tuszów Narodowy contains the villages and settlements of Babicha, Borki Nizińskie, Chyki-Dębiaki, Czajkowa, Grochowe, Jaślany, Józefów, Ławnica, Malinie, Pluty, Sarnów, Tuszów Mały and Tuszów Narodowy.

== Neighbouring gminas ==
Gmina Tuszów Narodowy is bordered by the town of Mielec and by the gminas of Baranów Sandomierski, Cmolas, Gawłuszowice, Mielec and Padew Narodowa.
