= Nasiłów, Masovian Voivodeship =

Nasiłów
- Village
- Location within Poland
- Coordinates: 52°18′N 22°25′E
- Country: Poland
- Voivodeship: Masovian
- County: Siedlce
- Gmina: Paprotnia

Nasiłów [naˈɕiwuf] is a village in the administrative district of Gmina Paprotnia, within Siedlce County, Masovian Voivodeship, in east-central Poland.
