= Władysław Sikorski =

Polish military and political leader (1881–1943)

Władysław Sikorski OB
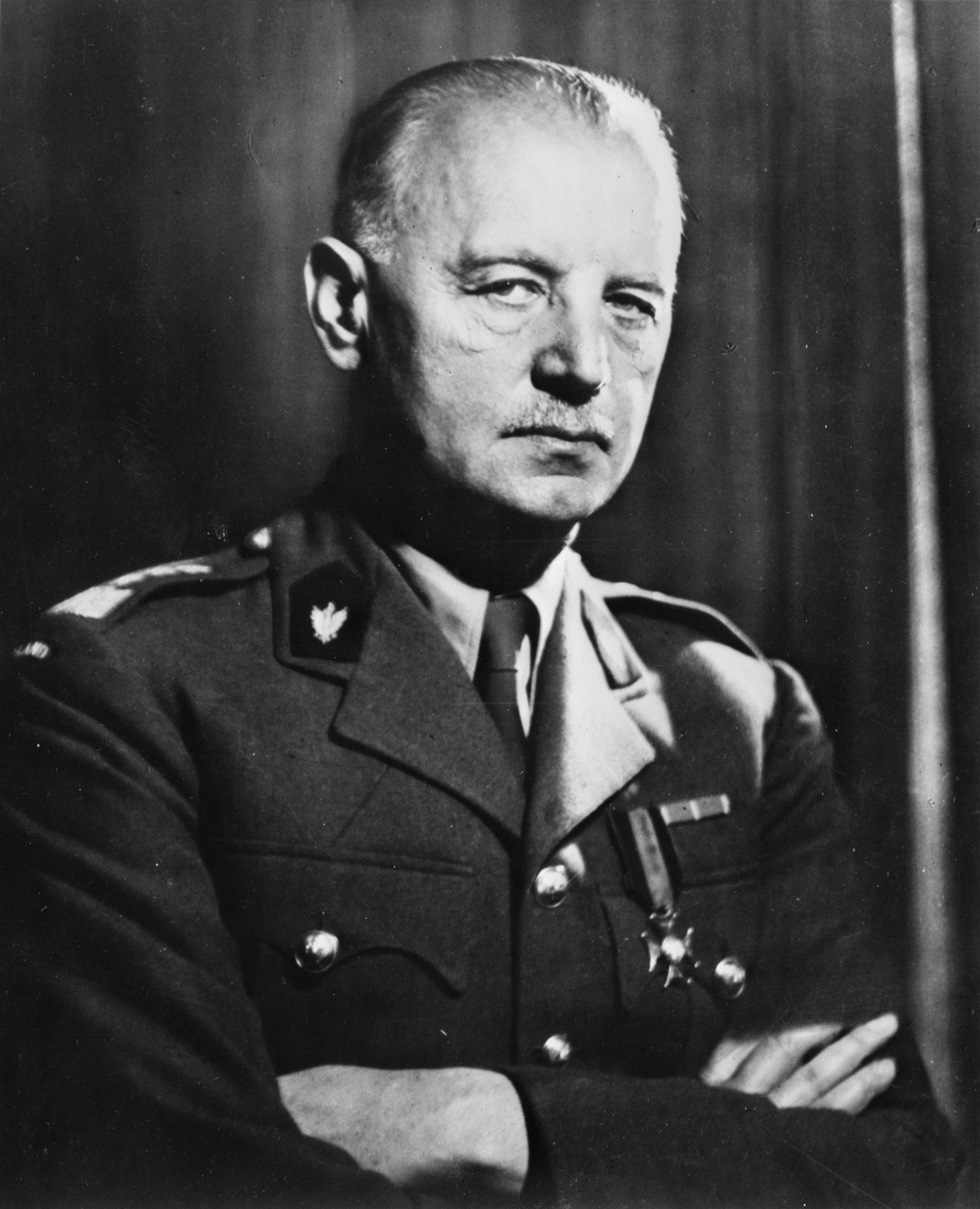
- Sikorski, c. 1942

Prime Minister of Poland
- In exile 30 September 1939 – 4 July 1943
- President: Władysław Raczkiewicz
- Preceded by: Felicjan Sławoj Składkowski (in-country)
- Succeeded by: Stanisław Mikołajczyk
- In office 16 December 1922 – 26 May 1923
- President: Maciej Rataj (acting); Stanisław Wojciechowski
- Preceded by: Julian Nowak
- Succeeded by: Wincenty Witos

3rd General Inspector of the Armed Forces
- In office 7 November 1939 – 4 July 1943
- President: Władysław Raczkiewicz
- Preceded by: Edward Śmigły-Rydz
- Succeeded by: Kazimierz Sosnkowski

Personal details
- Born: Władysław Eugeniusz Sikorski; 20 May 1881 Tuszów Narodowy, Austria-Hungary (now Poland)
- Died: 4 July 1943 (aged 62) near Gibraltar
- Cause of death: Aircraft crash
- Party: Independent
- Spouse: Helena Zubczewska (m. 1909)
- Children: Zofia Leśniowska
- Profession: Soldier, statesman
- Awards: See list below

Military service
- Allegiance: Austria-Hungary; Poland
- Branch/service: Austro-Hungarian Army Polish Legions Polish Army
- Years of service: 1914–1928; 1939–1943
- Rank: Lieutenant general
- Commands: 9th Infantry Division
- Battles/wars: First World War; Polish–Soviet War; Battle of Warsaw; Battle of Lwów; Battle of Niemen; Second World War

Władysław Eugeniusz Sikorski (Polish pronunciation: [vwaˈdɨswaf ɕiˈkɔrskʲi]; 20 May 1881 – 4 July 1943) was a Polish military and political leader. Before World War I, Sikorski established and participated in several underground organizations that promoted the cause of Polish independence. He fought with distinction in the Polish Legions during World War I, and later in the newly created Polish Army during the Polish–Soviet War of 1919–1921. In the latter war, he played a prominent role in the decisive 1920 Battle of Warsaw.

In the early years of the Second Polish Republic, Sikorski held government posts including prime minister (1922–1923) and minister of military affairs (1923–1924). Following Józef Piłsudski's May 1926 Coup and the installation of the Sanation government, he fell out of favor with the new régime.

During World War II, Sikorski became prime minister of the Polish government-in-exile, Commander-in-Chief of the Polish Armed Forces, and a vigorous advocate of the Polish cause in the diplomatic sphere. He supported the reestablishment of diplomatic relations between Poland and the Soviet Union, which had been severed after the September 1939 Soviet invasion of Poland. Subsequently, in April 1943, Soviet leader Joseph Stalin broke off Soviet-Polish diplomatic relations after Sikorski asked the International Red Cross to investigate the Katyn massacres.

In July 1943, a plane carrying Sikorski plunged into the sea immediately on takeoff from Gibraltar, killing all on board except the pilot. The exact circumstances of Sikorski's death have been disputed and have given rise to various theories surrounding the crash. Sikorski had been the most prestigious leader of the Polish exiles, and his death was a severe setback for the Polish cause.

== Early life and World War I ==
Sikorski was born in Tuszów Narodowy, Galicia, at the time part of the Austro-Hungarian Empire. He was the third child in his family; his father was Tomasz Sikorski, a school teacher; his mother was Emilia Habrowska. His grandfather, Tomasz Kopaszyna Sikorski, had fought and been wounded at the Battle of Olszynka Grochowska in the November Uprising, during which he received the Virtuti Militari medal.

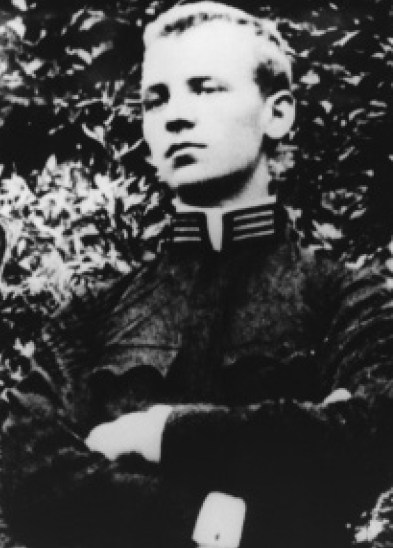
Sikorski in his youth

Sikorski attended the gimnazjum in Rzeszów (now Konarski's High School in Rzeszów) from 1893 to 1897, then transferred for a year to a Rzeszów teachers' college. In 1899 he attended the Lwów Franciszek Józef Gymnasium, and in 1902 he passed his final high school exam there. Starting that year, young Sikorski studied engineering at the Lwów Polytechnic, specializing in road and bridge construction, and graduated in 1908 with a diploma in hydraulic engineering. In 1906 Sikorski volunteered for a year's service in the Austro-Hungarian army and attended the Austrian Military School, obtaining an officer's diploma and becoming an army reserve second lieutenant (podporucznik rezerwy). In 1909 he married Helena Zubczewska, whom he met while at the high school in Lwów. In 1912 they had a daughter, Zofia. After graduation he lived in Leżajsk and worked for the Galician administration's hydraulic engineering department, working on the regulation of the San river, and later was involved in private enterprises related to construction, real estate and the petroleum trade.

During his studies at the Polytechnic, Sikorski became involved in the People's School Association (Towarzystwo Szkoły Ludowej), an organization dedicated to spreading literacy among the rural populace. Around 1904–1905 he was briefly involved with the endecja Association of the Polish Youth "Zet", and then drifted towards paramilitary socialist organizations related to the Polish Socialist Party, which was intent on securing Polish independence. He made contact with the socialist movement around 1905–1906 through the Union for the Resurrection of the Polish Nation (Związek Odrodzenia Narodu Polskiego). In 1908, in Lwów, Sikorski—together with Józef Piłsudski, Marian Kukiel, Walery Sławek, Kazimierz Sosnkowski, Witold Jodko-Narkiewicz and Henryk Minkiewicz—organized the secret Union for Active Struggle (Związek Walki Czynnej), with the aim of bringing about an uprising against the Russian Empire, one of Poland's three partitioners. In 1910, likewise in Lwów, Sikorski helped to organize a Riflemen's Association (the Związek Strzelecki), became the president of its Lwów chapter, and became responsible for the military arm within the Commission of Confederated Independence Parties (Komisja Skonfederowanych Stronnictw Niepodległościowych, KSSN). Having a military education, he lectured other activists on military tactics.

Upon the outbreak of the First World War in July 1914, Sikorski was mobilized, but through KSSN influence he was allowed to participate in the organizing of the Polish military units, rather than being delegated to other duties by the Austro-Hungarian military command. In the first few weeks of the war he became the chief of the Military Department in the Supreme National Committee (Naczelny Komitet Narodowy, NKN) and remained in this post until 1916. He was a commissioner in charge of the recruitment to the Polish Legions in Kraków, choosing this role over the opportunity to serve in the Legions as a frontline commander. On 30 September 1914 he was promoted to podpułkownik (lieutenant colonel), and soon after that he became the commander of a Legions officer school (Szkoła Podchorążych). The Legions—the army created by Józef Piłsudski to liberate Poland from Russian and, ultimately, Austro-Hungarian and German rule—initially fought in alliance with Austria-Hungary against Russia. From August 1915 there was growing tension between Sikorski, who advocated cooperation with Austria-Hungary, and Piłsudski, who felt that Austria-Hungary and Germany had betrayed the trust of the Polish people. In 1916 Piłsudski actively campaigned to have the Military Department of NKN disbanded. In July that year, Sikorski was promoted to pułkownik (colonel). Following the Act of 5th November (1916), Sikorski became involved with the Legions' alternatives, the Polish Auxiliary Corps and Polnische Wehrmacht. In June 1917 Piłsudski refused Austro-Hungarian orders to swear loyalty to the Habsburg Emperor (the "oath crisis") and was interned at the fortress of Magdeburg, while Sikorski abandoned Polnische Wehrmacht and returned to the Austro-Hungarian Army. In 1918, however, following the February Treaty of Brest-Litovsk and the battle of Rarańcza, Sikorski chose belatedly to side with Piłsudski, announcing solidarity with his actions, protesting against the planned separation of Chełm Land from the planned Polish state, and thus soon joined Piłsudski in internment (he would be held in Dulfalva (Dulovo)). Nonetheless, this was not enough to smooth the differences between him and Piłsudski, and these two major Polish leaders would drift farther apart in the continuing years.

== Eastern wars ==
=== Polish–Ukrainian war ===
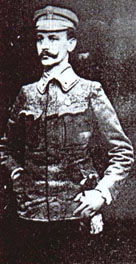
Sikorski in 1918

In 1918 the Russian, Austro-Hungarian and German empires collapsed, and Poland once again became independent, but the borders of the Second Polish Republic were not fully determined and were unstable. In the east they would be formed in the escalating conflicts among Polish, Ukrainian, Lithuanian and Soviet forces in what culminated in the Polish–Soviet War (1919–1921). Winston Churchill commented: "The war of giants had ended, the wars of the pygmies began." Bolshevik leaders saw Poland as a bridge that the communist revolution would have to force to bring communism to the West, and Poland's very existence would soon be at stake.

=== Polish–Soviet war ===
After his release from internment, from 1 May 1918 Sikorski worked for the Regency Council, organizing the new Polish Army. He was soon at the frontlines again, this time in the Polish–Ukrainian War, where troops under his command secured and defended Przemyśl in October–November 1918.

Polish independence came in November 1918 with the formation of the Second Republic of Poland. In the course of the Polish–Ukrainian War, and in the opening phase of the Polish–Soviet War, Sikorski, now a high-ranking officer of the Polish Army was involved in further operations in the Galicia region. In January 1919 he commanded troops defending Gródek Jagielloński; in March that year he commanded an infantry division, advancing to Stawczany and Zbrucz. From 1 August 1918 Sikorski commanded the Polesie Group, and the Polish 9th Infantry Division. In order to curtail excesses of the forces under his command, he oversaw trials of 36 officers. His forces took Mozyr and Kalenkowicze in March 1920, and he would command the Polesie Group during Poland's Kiev offensive in April 1920, advancing to the Dnieper River and the Chernobyl region. On 1 April that year he was promoted to brigade general.

As the Polish–Soviet War grew in intensity, in late April 1920 the Red Army of Russia's new Soviet regime pushed back Polish forces and invaded Poland. Subsequently, Sikorski successfully defended Mozyr and Kalenkowicze until 29 June, but later failed to hold the Brest fortress, although he defended it long enough to allow the Polish forces in the region to retreat in an orderly manner. On 6 August he was named the commander of the newly formed Polish 5th Army, which was tasked with holding the front to the north of Modlin, between Narew and Wkra rivers. He distinguished himself commanding the 5th Army on the Lower Vistula front during the Battle of Warsaw. At that time Soviet forces, expecting an easy final victory, were surprised and crippled by the Polish counter-attack. During that battle (sometimes referred to as "the Miracle at the Vistula") Sikorski stopped the Bolshevik advance north of Warsaw and gave Piłsudski, the Polish commander-in-chief, the time he needed for his counter-offensive; beginning with the 15 August his forces successfully engaged the Soviet 5th and 15th Armies. After the Battle of Warsaw, from 30 August, Sikorski commanded the 3rd Army. His forces took Pińsk, and fought during the latter stages of the Battle of Lwów and the Battle of Zamość, and then after Battle of Niemen advanced with his forces toward Latvia and deep into Belarus. The Poles defeated the Soviets, and the Polish–Soviet Treaty of Riga (March 1921) gave Poland substantial areas of Belarus and Ukraine's (Kresy). Sikorski's fame was enhanced as he became known to the Polish public as one of the heroes of the Polish–Soviet War. He also kept publishing military science articles during the war itself. For his valorous achievements Sikorski was promoted to divisional general on 28 February 1921, and was awarded Poland's highest military decoration, the order of Virtuti Militari, on 15 March that year.

== In government and in opposition ==
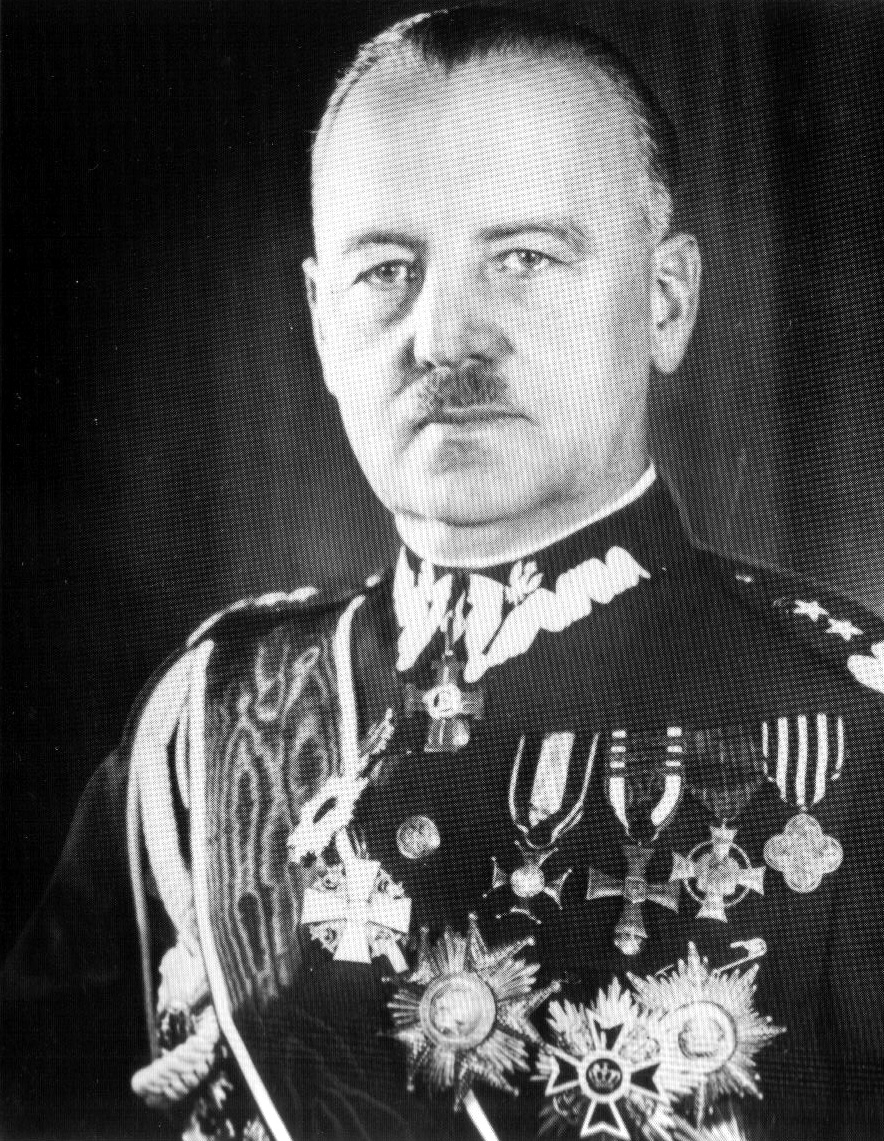
Sikorski in 1923

Despite their differences, Piłsudski praised Sikorski in his reports, recommending him for Chief of the General Staff and minister of war positions; only generals Kazimierz Sosnkowski and Edward Rydz-Śmigły received better evaluations from him. Sikorski was popular among many soldiers, and in politics, particularly appealing to Polish conservatives and liberals. On 1 April 1921 Sikorski replaced General Tadeusz Rozwadowski as chief of the Polish General Staff. Between 1922 and 1925 he held a number of high government offices. Based on his analysis, the Polish Council of Ministers adopted new foreign policy that would remain roughly unchanged until the late 1930s (preserving the status quo in Europe, and treating Germany and Russia as equal potential threats). On 12 December 1922 he issued a general order, stressing the need for the military to stay out of politics. After the assassination of President of Poland Gabriel Narutowicz on 16 December 1922, the Marshal of the Sejm (the Sejm being the Polish parliament), Maciej Rataj, appointed Sikorski prime minister. From 18 December 1922, to 26 May 1923, Sikorski served as prime minister and also as minister of internal affairs, and was even considered as possible president. During his brief tenure as prime minister, he became popular with the Polish public and carried out essential reforms in addition to guiding the country's foreign policy in a direction that gained the approval and cooperation of the League of Nations and tightened Polish-French cooperation. He obtained recognition of Poland's eastern frontiers from the UK, France, and the United States during the Conference of Ambassadors on 15 March 1923. He aided Treasury Minister Władysław Grabski's reforms aimed at curtailing inflation and reforming the currency and supported ethnic minorities. His government nonetheless lost support in the Sejm and resigned on 26 May 1923.

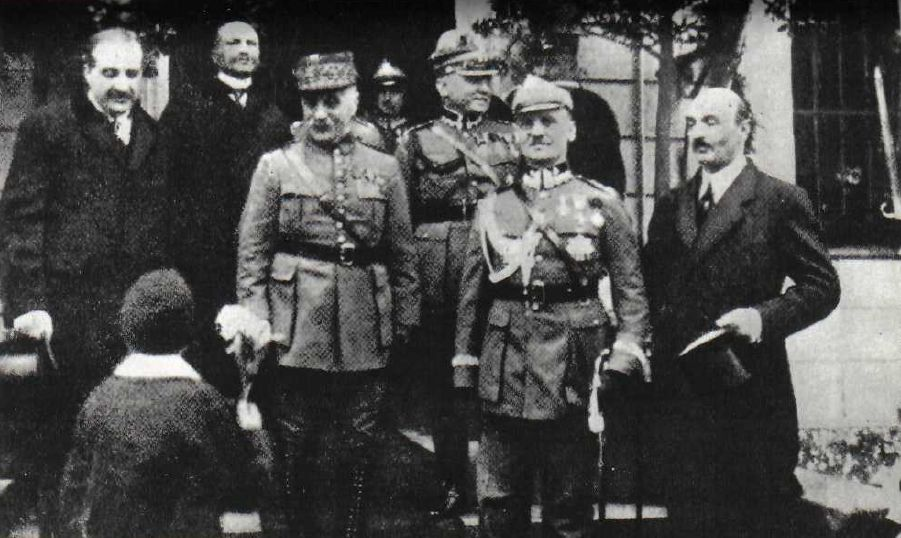
Sikorski with Marshal of France Ferdinand Foch (1923)

From 30 September 1923 to 1924 he held the post of chief inspector of infantry (Generalny Inspektor Piechoty). From 17 February 1924 to 1925, under Prime Minister Grabski, he was minister of military affairs and guided the modernization of the Polish military; he also created the Korpus Ochrony Pogranicza. He worked actively to promote the cause of the Polish-French military alliance. His proposal to increase the powers of the minister of military affairs while reducing those of the Chief Inspector of the Armed Forces met with sharp disapproval from Piłsudski, who at that time was gathering many opponents of the current government. From 1925 to 1928 Sikorski commanded Military Corps District (Okręg Korpusu) VI in Lwów.

A democrat and supporter of the Sejm, Sikorski declared his opposition to Józef Piłsudski's May 1926 coup d'état; he remained in Lwów, refused to dispatch his forces, and played no substantive role in the short struggle. In 1928 he was relieved by Piłsudski of his command and, while he remained on active service, he received no other posting. That year also saw the publication of his book on the Polish–Soviet War, Nad Wisłą i Wkrą. Studium do polsko–radzieckiej wojny 1920 roku (At the Vistula and Wkra Rivers: a Contribution to the Study of the Polish–Soviet War of 1920). He would spend the following years publishing works on military theory, history, and foreign policy. His most famous work was his 1934 book Przyszła wojna – jej możliwości i charakter oraz związane z nimi zagadnienia obrony kraju ("War in the Future: Its Possibilities and Character and Associated Questions of National Defense", published in English in 1943 as Modern Warfare: Its Character, Its Problems), in which he predicted the return of maneuver warfare. He wrote several other books and many articles, foreseeing, among other things, the rapid militarization of Germany.

In due course, soon after he was relieved of command, and as a semi-dictatorial Sanation regime was established, Sikorski joined the anti-Piłsudski opposition. Sikorski largely withdrew from active politics, spending much of his time in Paris, France, working with the French Ecole Superieure de Guerre (war college). Even after the death of Piłsudski in 1935, he was still marginalized, politically and militarily, by Piłsudski's successors. In February the following year, together with several prominent Polish politicians (Wincenty Witos, Ignacy Paderewski, and General Józef Haller) he joined the Front Morges, an anti-Sanation political grouping.

== Prime Minister in exile ==
Sikorski (left) with Polish General Marian Kukiel, Clementine and Winston Churchill, and Polish ambassador Count Edward Raczyński

In the days before Poland was invaded by Germany in September 1939, and during the invasion itself, Sikorski's request for a military command continued to be denied by the Polish commander in chief, Marshal Edward Rydz-Śmigły. Sikorski escaped through Romania to Paris, where on 28 September he joined Władysław Raczkiewicz and Stanisław Mikołajczyk in a Polish government-in-exile, taking command of the newly formed Polish Armed Forces in France. Two days later, on 30 September, president Raczkiewicz called him to serve as the first Polish prime minister in exile. On 7 November he became commander in chief and General Inspector of the Armed Forces (Naczelny Wódz i Generalny Inspektor Sił Zbrojnych), following Rydz-Śmigły's resignation. Sikorski would also hold the position of Polish Minister of Military Affairs, thus uniting in his person all control over the Polish military in wartime.

During his years as prime minister in exile, Sikorski personified the hopes and dreams of millions of Poles, as reflected in the saying, "When the sun is higher, Sikorski is nearer" (Polish: "Gdy słoneczko wyżej, to Sikorski bliżej"). At the same time, from early on he had to work to reconcile the pro- and anti-Piłsudskiite factions.

His government was recognized by the western Allies. Nonetheless, Sikorski's government struggled to get its point of view heard by France and the United Kingdom. The western Allies refused to recognize the Soviet Union as an aggressor, despite the Soviet invasion of Poland on 17 September 1939. Furthermore, he struggled to secure resources needed to recreate the Polish Army in exile.

Poland, even with its territories occupied, still commanded substantial armed forces: the Polish Navy had sailed to Britain just before the war's outbreak, and thousands of Polish soldiers and airmen had evacuated from overrun Poland via Hungary and Romania. A new Polish Army was soon re-formed in France and French-mandated Syria; and a Polish Air Force, in France. In addition, Poland had a large resistance movement, and Sikorski's policies included founding the Union of Armed Struggle (Związek Walki Zbrojnej), later transformed into the Home Army (Armia Krajowa), and creation of an agency, the Government Delegation for Poland to supervise the Polish Underground State in occupied Poland.

In 1940 the Polish Highland Brigade took part in the Battle of Narvik in Norway, and two Polish divisions participated in the defense of France, while a Polish motorized brigade and two infantry divisions were in process of forming. A Polish Independent Carpathian Brigade was created in French-mandated Syria. The Polish Air Force in France had 86 aircraft with one and a half of the squadrons fully operational, and the remaining two and a half in various stages of training. Although many Polish personnel had died in the fighting or had been interned in Switzerland following the fall of France, General Sikorski refused French Marshal Philippe Pétain's proposal of a Polish capitulation to Germany. On 19 June 1940, Sikorski met with British prime minister Winston Churchill and promised that Polish forces would fight alongside the British until final victory. Sikorski and his government moved to London and were able to evacuate many Polish troops to Britain. After the signing of a Polish-British Military Agreement on 5 August 1940, they proceeded to build up and train the Polish Armed Forces in the West. Experienced Polish pilots took part in the Battle of Britain, where the Polish 303 Fighter Squadron achieved the highest number of kills of any Allied squadron. Sikorski's Polish forces would form one of the most significant Allied contingents.^{[a]}

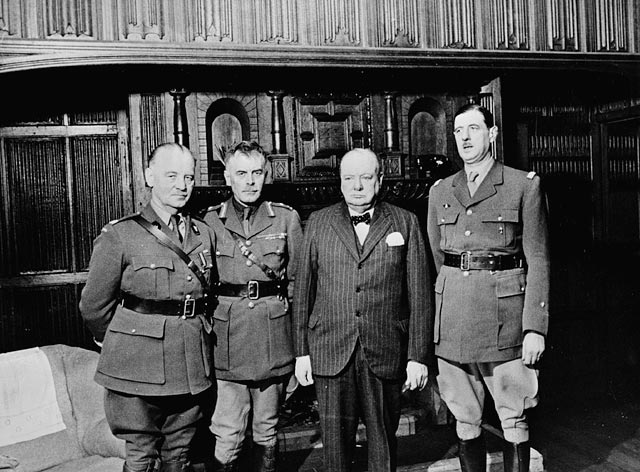
Sikorski (left) with Andrew McNaughton, Winston Churchill and Charles de Gaulle

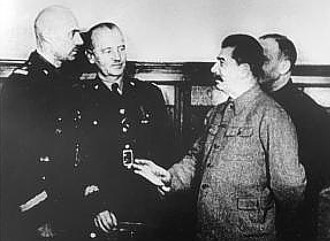
Władysław Anders and Sikorski with Joseph Stalin (1941)

The Fall of France weakened Sikorski's position, and his proposal to consider building a new Polish army in the Soviet-occupied territories led to much criticism from within the Polish community in exile. On 19 July Raczkiewicz dismissed him from his position as the prime minister, replacing him with August Zaleski; however, within days pressure from Sikorski's sympathizers, including the British government, made Raczkiewicz reconsider his decision, and Sikorski was reinstated as the prime minister on 25 July.

One of Sikorski's political goals was the creation of a Central and Eastern European federation, starting with a Polish-Czechoslovak confederation. He saw such an organization as necessary if smaller states were to stand up to traditional German and Russian imperialism. That concept, although ultimately futile, gained some traction around that time, as Sikorski and Edvard Beneš from the Czechoslovak government-in-exile, signed an agreement declaring the intent to pursue closer cooperation on 10 November that year. On 24 December 1940 Sikorski was promoted to generał broni. In March 1941 he visited the United States; he would visit the US again in March and December 1942.

Following the German invasion of the Soviet Union ("Operation Barbarossa") in June 1941, Sikorski opened negotiations with the Soviet ambassador to London, Ivan Maisky, to re-establish diplomatic relations between Poland and the Soviet Union, which had been broken off after the Soviet invasion of Poland in September 1939. In December that year, Sikorski went to Moscow with a diplomatic mission. The Polish Government reached an agreement with the Soviet Union (the Sikorski-Maisky Pact of 17 August 1941), confirmed by Joseph Stalin in December of that year. Stalin agreed to invalidate the September 1939 Soviet-German partition of Poland, declare the Russo-German Molotov–Ribbentrop Pact of August 1939 null and void, and release tens of thousands of Polish prisoners-of-war held in Soviet camps. Pursuant to an agreement between the Polish government-in-exile and Stalin, the Soviets granted "amnesty" to many Polish citizens, from whom a new army (the Polish II Corps) was formed under General Władysław Anders and later evacuated to the Middle East, where Britain faced a dire shortage of military forces. The whereabouts of thousands more Polish officers, however, would remain unknown for two more years, and this would weigh heavily on both Polish–Soviet relations and on Sikorski's fate.

Initially, Sikorski supported the Polish–Soviet rapprochement, which reignited criticism of his person from some Polish factions. Nonetheless, Sikorski soon realized that the Soviet Union had plans for Polish territories, which would be unacceptable to Polish public. The Soviets began their diplomatic offensive after their first major military victory in the Battle of Moscow, and intensified this policy after the battle of Stalingrad, showing less and less regard for their deals with Poland. In January 1942 British diplomat Stafford Cripps informed General Sikorski that while Stalin planned to extend Polish borders to the west, by giving Poland Germany's East Prussia, he also wanted to considerably push Poland's eastern frontier westwards, along the lines of the Versailles concept of the Curzon Line, and acquire Lwów and Wilno, if not both. Sikorski's stance on eastern borders was not inflexible; he noted in some documents that some concessions might be acceptable, however, giving up both Lwów and Wilno was not. Initially he also referred to plans of annexing German land to the Oder as megalomania.

== Katyn revelation and death ==
In 1943 the fragile relations between the Soviet Union and the Polish government-in-exile finally reached their breaking point when, on 13 April, the Germans announced via the Katyn Commission the discovery of the bodies of 20,000 Polish officers who had been murdered by the Soviets and buried in Katyn Forest, near Smolensk, Russia. Stalin claimed that the atrocity had been carried out by the Germans, while Nazi propaganda orchestrated by Joseph Goebbels successfully exploited the Katyn massacre to drive a wedge between Poland, the Western Allies and the Soviet Union. Moscow did not acknowledge responsibility for this and similar massacres of Polish officers until 1989.

When Sikorski refused to accept the Soviet explanation and requested an investigation by the International Red Cross on 16 April, the Soviets accused the government-in-exile of cooperating with Nazi Germany and broke off diplomatic relations on 25 April.

Beginning in late May 1943, Sikorski began visiting Polish forces stationed in the Middle East. In addition to inspecting the forces and raising morale, Sikorski was also occupied with political matters; around that time, a conflict was growing between him and General Władysław Anders, as Sikorski was still open to some normalization of Polish–Soviet relations, to which Anders was vehemently opposed.

On 4 July 1943, while Sikorski was returning from an inspection of Polish forces in the Middle East, he was killed, together with his daughter, his chief of staff Tadeusz Klimecki, and seven others, when his plane, a Liberator II, serial AL523, crashed into the sea 16 seconds after takeoff from Gibraltar Airport at 23:07 hours. The crash was attributed to cargo on the plane shifting to the back upon takeoff. Only the pilot, Eduard Prchal (1911–1984), survived the crash.

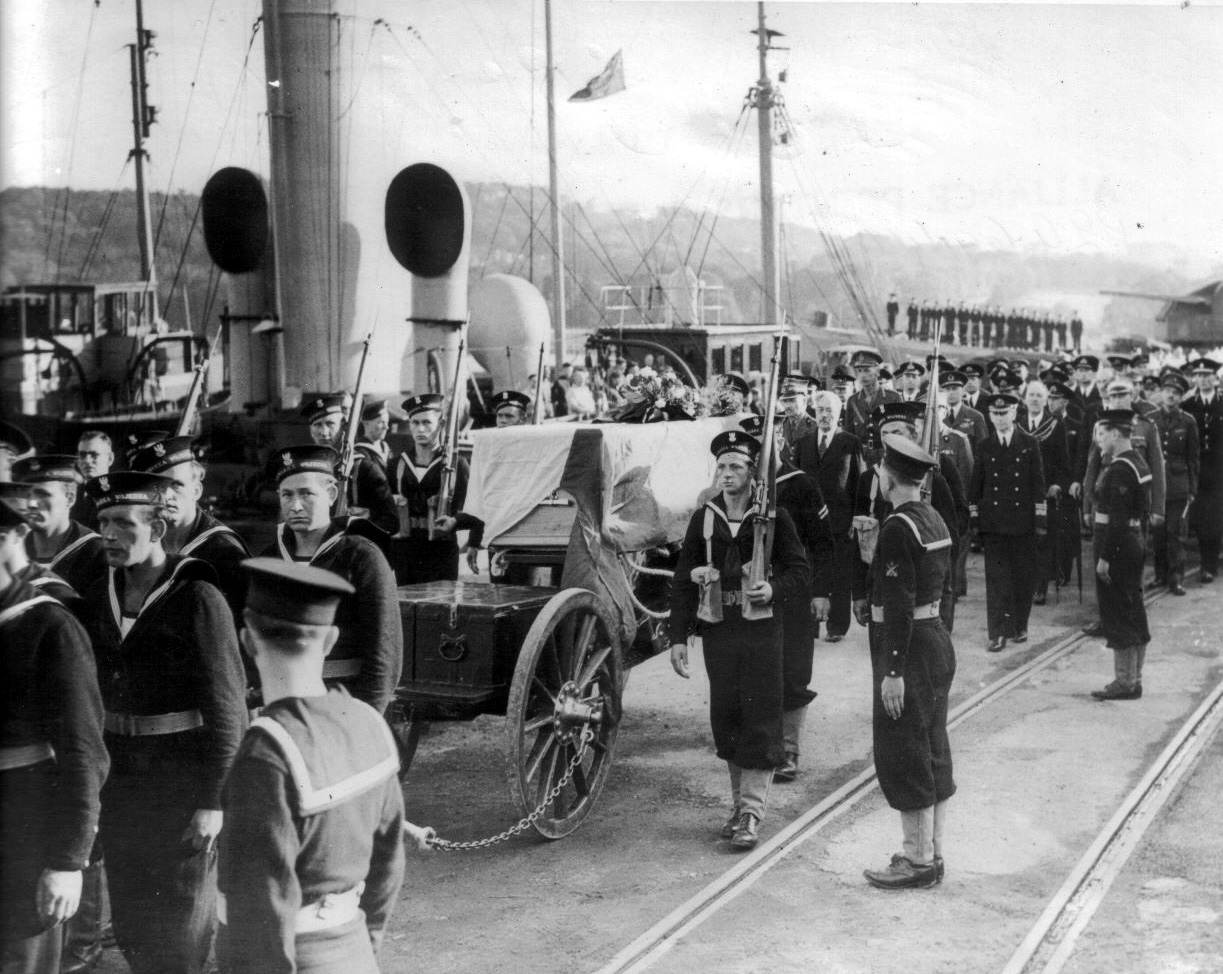
Sikorski's funeral

Sikorski was buried in a brick-lined grave among Polish graves in the war graves plot at the cemetery in Newark-on-Trent, England, on 16 July that year. Winston Churchill delivered a eulogy at his funeral. On 14 September 1993, his remains were exhumed and transferred via Polish Air Force Tu-154M, and escorted by RAF 56 Sqn Tornado F3 jets, to the royal crypts at Wawel Castle in Kraków, Poland.

== Aftermath ==
Immediately after the crash, a Polish officer who had witnessed the event from the airstrip began sobbing quietly and repeating: "Now Poland is lost! Now Poland is lost!" ("To Polska stracona!") General Sikorski's death marked a turning point for Polish influence amongst the Anglo-American allies. No Pole after him would have much sway with the Allied politicians. Sikorski had been the most prestigious leader of the Polish exiles and his death was a severe setback for the Polish cause.

After the Soviets had broken off diplomatic relations with Sikorski's government in April 1943, in May and June Stalin had recalled several Soviet ambassadors for "consultations": Maxim Litvinov from Washington, Fyodor Gusev from Montreal, and Ivan Maisky from London.

While Churchill had been publicly supportive of Sikorski's government, reminding Stalin of his pact with Nazi Germany in 1939 and of their joint attack on Poland, in secret consultations with Roosevelt he admitted that Poland would have to make some concessions to appease the powerful Soviets. The Polish–Soviet crisis was beginning to threaten cooperation between the western Allies and the Soviets at a time when the Poles' importance to the western Allies, essential in the first years of the war, was beginning to fade with the entry, into the conflict, of the military and industrial giants, the Soviet Union and the United States.

The Allies had no intention of letting Sikorski's successor, Stanisław Mikołajczyk, jeopardize the alliance with the Soviets. No representative of the Polish government-in-exile was invited to attend the Tehran Conference (28 November – 1 December 1943) or the Yalta Conference (4–11 February 1945), the two crucial events in which the Western Allies and the Soviets discussed the shape of the postwar world and decided Poland's fate.

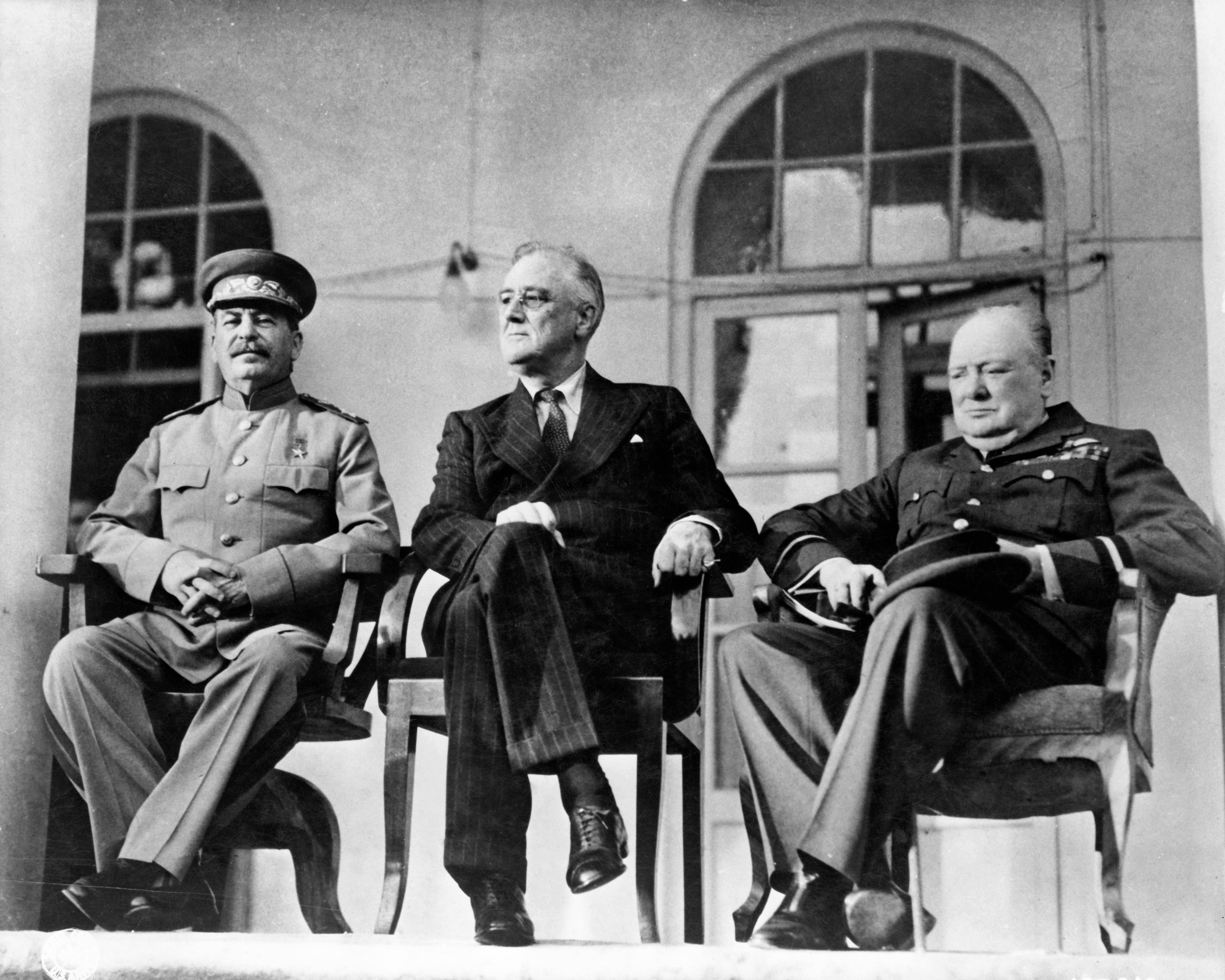
Teheran Conference, 1943: Stalin, Roosevelt, Churchill

Only four months after Sikorski's death, in November 1943, at Tehran, Churchill and Roosevelt agreed with Stalin that the whole of Poland east of the Curzon Line would be ceded to the Soviets. In Teheran, neither Churchill nor Roosevelt objected to Stalin's suggestion that the Polish government-in-exile in London did not represent Polish interests; as historian Anita Prażmowska notes, "this spelled the end of that government's tenuous influence and raison d'être."

After the Teheran Conference, Stalin decided to create his own puppet government for Poland, and a Committee of National Liberation (the PKWN) was proclaimed in the summer of 1944. The Soviet Government recognized the Committee as the only legitimate authority in Poland and called Mikołajczyk's Government in London an "illegal and self-styled authority." Mikołajczyk would serve as prime minister's until 24 November 1944 when, realizing the increasing powerlessness of the Polish Government-in-Exile, he resigned and was succeeded by Tomasz Arciszewski, "whose obscurity", according to historian Mieczysław B. Biskupski, "signaled the arrival of the government in exile at total inconsequentiality."

Stalin soon began a campaign for recognition by the Western Allies of a Soviet-backed Polish government led by Wanda Wasilewska, a dedicated communist with a seat in the Supreme Soviet; and with General Zygmunt Berling, commander of the 1st Polish Army in Russia, as commander-in-chief of all Polish Armed Forces. By the time of the Potsdam Conference in 1945, Poland had been relegated to the Soviet sphere of influence – an abandonment of the Polish Government-in-Exile that led to the rise of the Western-betrayal concept.

== Remembrance ==
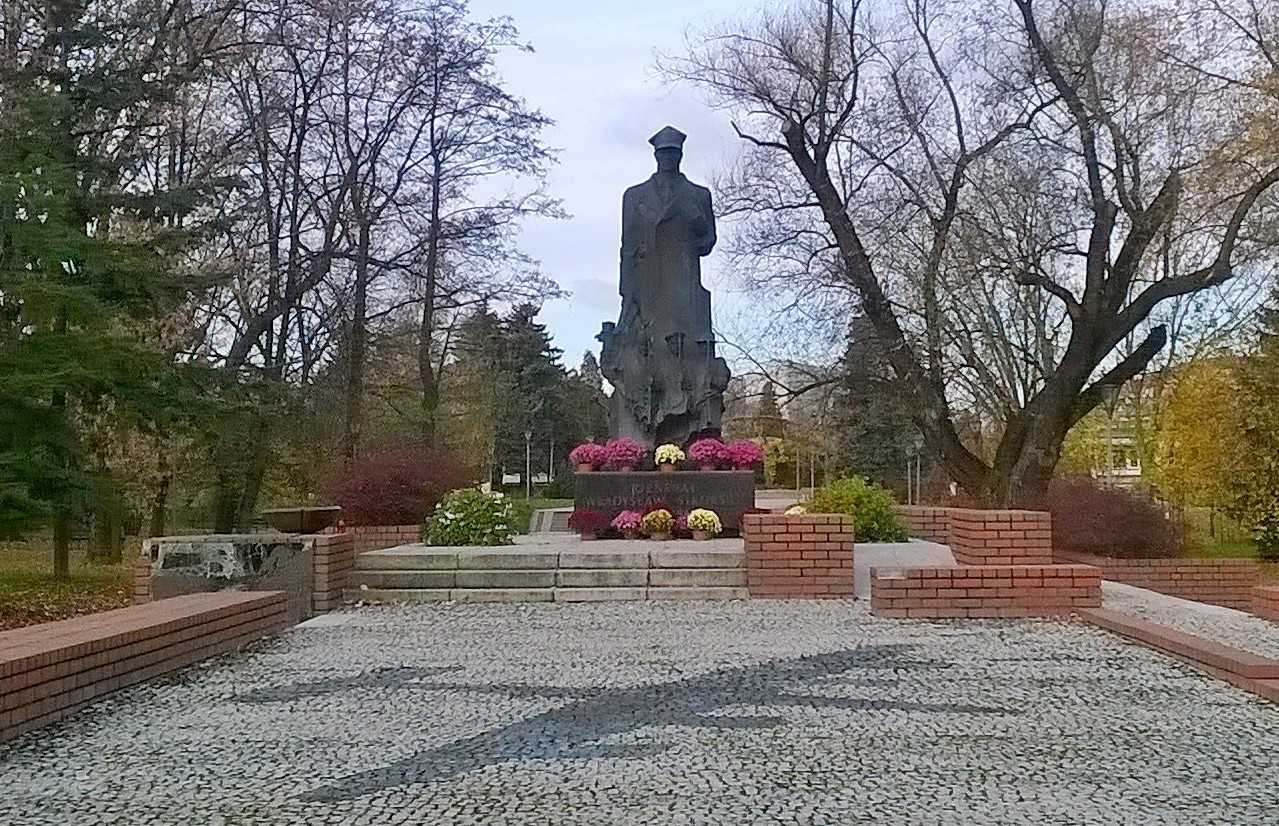
Władysław Sikorski Monument in Rzeszów

A number of poems dedicated to Sikorski were written by Polish authors during the war. In its aftermath, in the People's Republic of Poland, Sikorski's historic role, like that of all the adherents of the London government, would be minimized and distorted by propaganda, and those loyal to the government-in-exile would be liable to imprisonment and even execution. In time, restrictions on discussing Sikorski began to ease; on a centennial anniversary of his birth in 1981, commemorative events were held on the Rzeszów Voivodeship, including an academic conference, and revealing of plaques in Nisko and Leżajsk. Ryszard Zieliński published a novel on him, Wejście w mrok (1971), and in 1983 a movie, Katastrofa w Gibraltarze by Bohdan Poręba, was made. The Polish government-in-exile, of which Sikorski was the first prime minister, would continue in existence until the end of communist rule in Poland in 1990, when Lech Wałęsa became the first post-communist president of Poland. On 17 September 1993 a statue of Sikorski, sculpted by Wiesław Bielak, was unveiled in Rzeszów. In 1995, Sikorski became the patron of the newly formed Polish 9th Mechanized Brigade. In 2003, the Polish parliament (Sejm) declared the year (60th anniversary of Sikorski's death) to be the "Year of General Sikorski". A number of streets and schools in Poland bear Sikorski's name.

Memory of General Sikorski was also preserved both in Poland and abroad, by organizations like the Sikorski Institute in London. In the UK, Sikorski received honoris causa degrees from the University of Liverpool and University of St Andrews. In 1981, a commemorative plaque was revealed at Hotel Rubens in London, where during the war Polish Military Headquarters, including Sikorski's office, were located. He is commemorated in London's Portland Place, near the Embassy of Poland, with a larger than life statue, unveiled in 2000. A propeller from the plane in which he died is centrepiece of a memorial to Sikorski, unveiled in 2013, at Europa Point, Gibraltar.A commemorative stone to Sikorski remains in Newark-upon-Trent Cemetery, while his tombstone from the cemetery (in meantime in storage) was returned to Poland by Newark Council in 2025.

== Death controversy ==
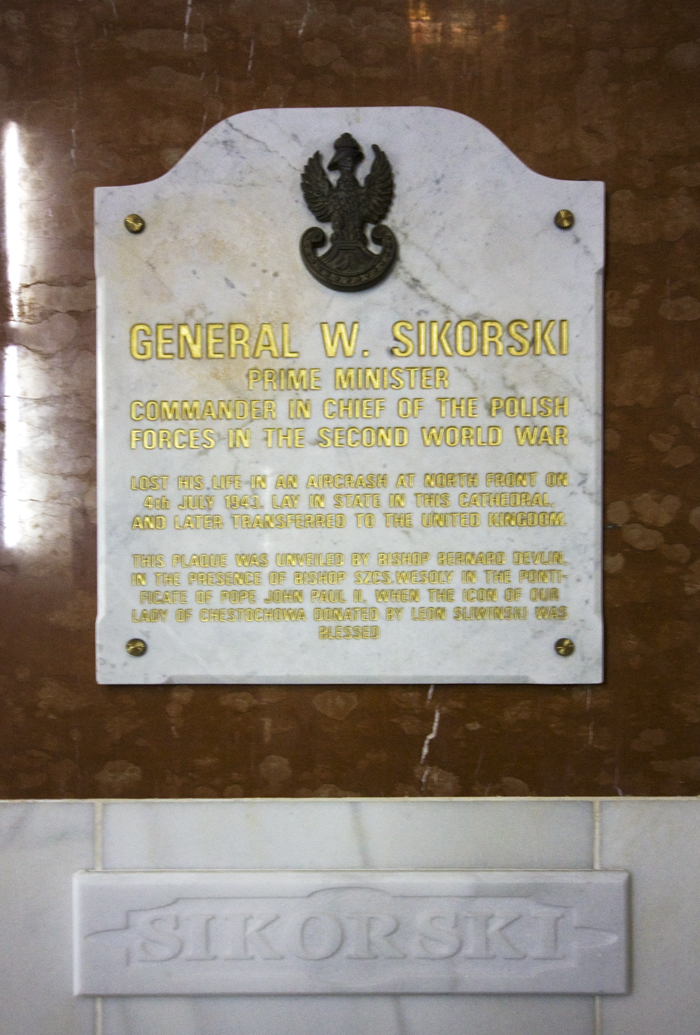
Plaque in memory of Sikorski at the Cathedral of St. Mary the Crowned in Gibraltar.

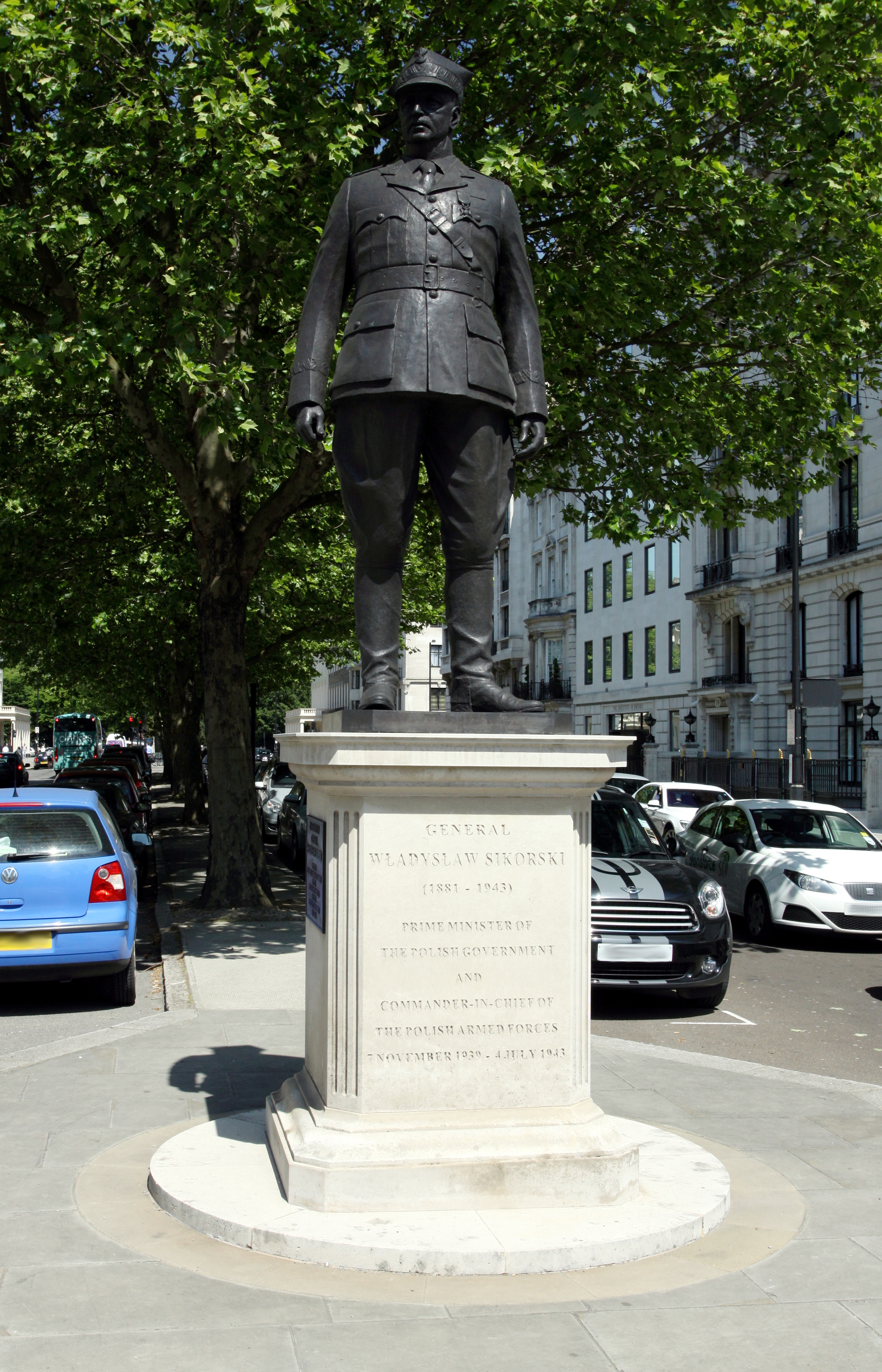
Statue of Sikorski, Portland Place, London, erected 2000

A British Court of Inquiry convened on 7 July 1943, investigated the crash of Sikorski's Liberator II serial AL 523, but was unable to determine the cause, finding only that it was an accident and "due to jamming of elevator controls", noting that "it has not been possible to determine how the jamming occurred but it has been established that there was no sabotage.". The Polish government refused to endorse this report, due to the contradiction about the cause not being determined but sabotage being ruled out.

The political context of the event, coupled with a variety of curious circumstances (for instance, the Soviet agent Kim Philby was head of counter-intelligence for MI6 in Gibraltar at the time), immediately gave rise to numerous speculation that Sikorski's death had been no accident, and may have been the direct result of a Soviet, British, or even Polish conspiracy. Some modern sources note that the accident is not fully explained. However, as Roman Wapiński noted in his biographical entry on Sikorski in the Polish Biographical Dictionary in 1997, no conclusive evidence of any wrongdoing has been found, and Sikorski's official cause of death is listed as an accident.

In 2008 Sikorski was exhumed and his remains were examined by Polish scientists, who in 2009 concluded that he died due to injuries consistent with an air crash and that there was no evidence that Sikorski was murdered, ruling out theories that he was shot or strangled before the incident; however they did not rule out the possibility of sabotage, which was investigated by the Polish Institute of National Remembrance. In 2013, the investigation ended, with the Institute of National Remembrance concluding that deliberate tampering to the aircraft could be neither confirmed nor ruled out.

== Honours and awards ==
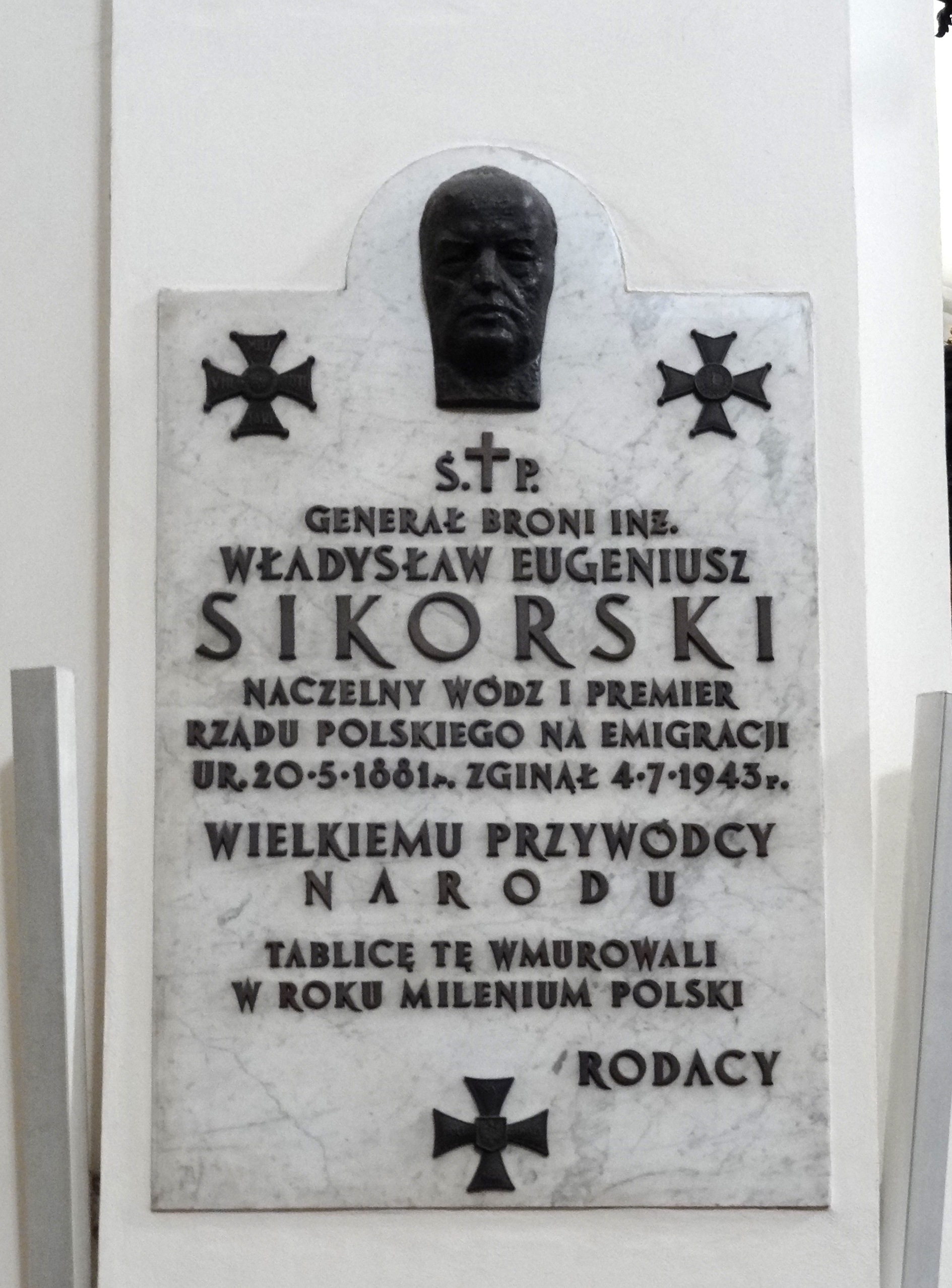
Plaque to Sikorski in a church in Warsaw inaugurated on the 1000th anniversary of the establishment of Poland - fot. Ivonna Nowicka

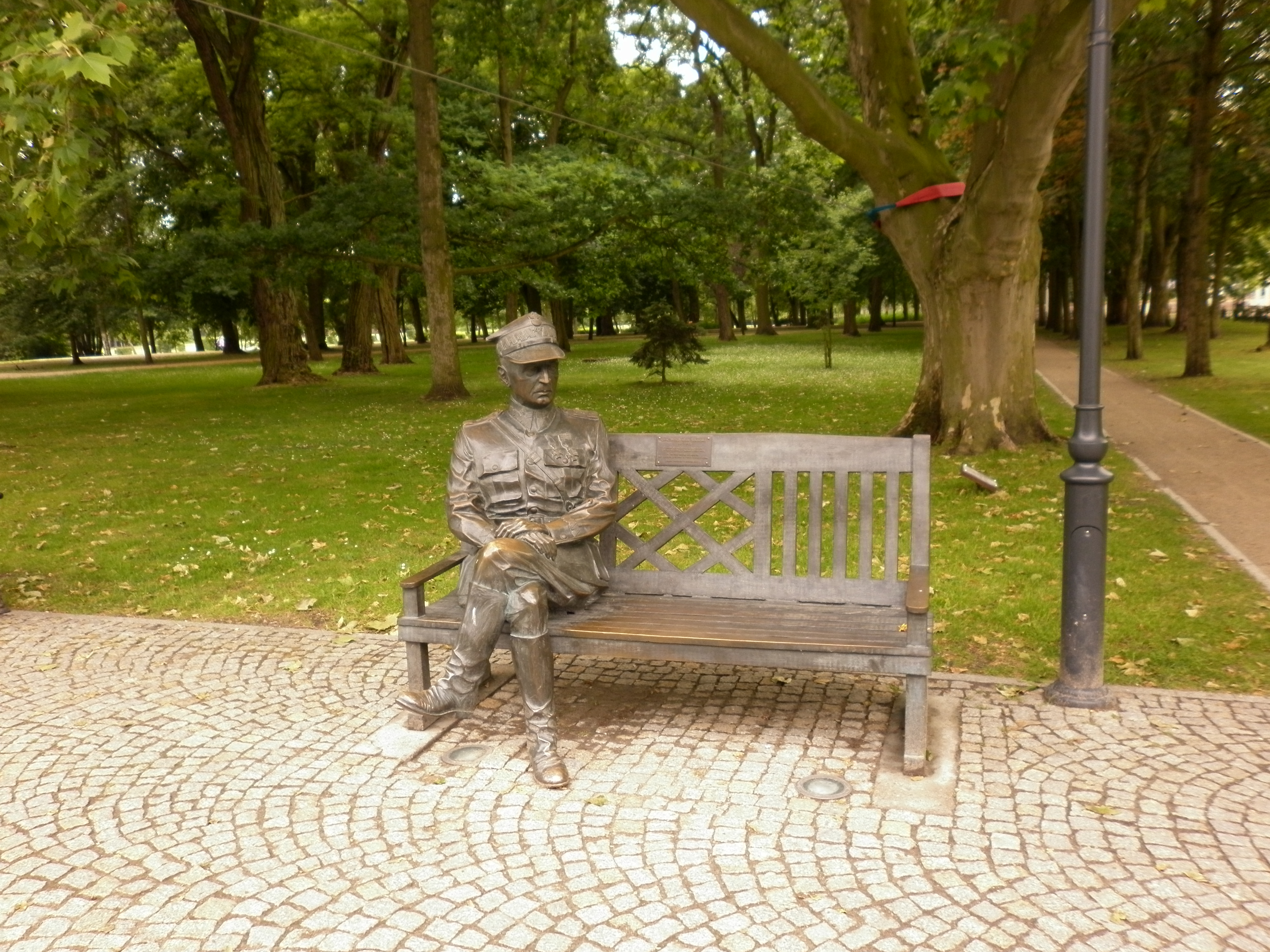
Seated sculpture of Sikorski as a young officer, Inowrocław, Poland

- Poland:
  - Order of the White Eagle (posthumously in 1943)
  - Commander of the Virtuti Militari (1923)
  - Silver Cross of the Virtuti Militari (1921)
  - Grand Cross of the Order of Polonia Restituta (1923)
  - Commander's Cross of the Order of Polonia Restituta (1921)
  - Order of the Cross of Grunwald, 1st class (posthumously in 1946 by the State National Council)
  - Cross of Valour, four times
  - Gold Cross of Merit
  - Cross of Independence
  - Cross of Merit of the Central Lithuanian Army
  - Commemorative Medal for the War of 1918–1921
  - Medal of the Decade of Regained Independence
- Other countries:
  - Military Merit Cross (Austria-Hungary)
  - Commemorative Cross of Mobilization 1912–1913 (Austria-Hungary)
  - Grand Officer of the Order of Leopold (Belgium)
  - Order of the White Lion (Czechoslovakia)
  - Czechoslovak War Cross 1939–1945 (Czechoslovakia)
  - Czechoslovak War Cross 1918 (Czechoslovakia)
  - Cross of Liberty for Military Leadership (Estonia)
  - Cross of Liberty for Personal Courage (Estonia)
  - Grand Cross of the White Rose of Finland (Finland)
  - Commander of the White Rose of Finland (Finland)
  - Grand Cross of the Legion of Honour (France)
  - Commander of the Legion of Honour (France)
  - Knight Grand Cross of the Order of the Crown of Italy (Italy)
  - Order of the Rising Sun, 2nd Class, Gold and Silver Star (Japan)
  - Grand Officer of the Order of the Three Stars (Latvia)
  - Grand Cross of the Order of the Aztec Eagle (Mexico)
  - War Cross with Sword (Norway)
  - Grand Cross of the Order of the Star of Romania (Romania)
  - Grand Cross of the Order of the Crown (Romania)
  - Commander of the Order of St. Sava (Yugoslavia)
  - Grand Cross of the Order of the White Eagle (Yugoslavia)

== Works ==
General Sikorski was also an active writer on the subjects of military tactics and describing his personal war experiences. His works include:

- Regulamin musztry Związku Strzeleckiego i elementarna taktyka piechoty (Drill Regulations of the Riflemen's Association and Basic Infantry Tactics), 1911.
- Nad Wisłą i Wkrą. Studium do polsko–radzieckiej wojny 1920 roku (At the Vistula and the Wkra Rivers: a Contribution to the Study of the Polish–Soviet War of 1920), 1923; latest edition, Warsaw, 1991.
- O polską politykę państwową. Umowy i deklaracje z okresu pełnienia urzędu prezesa Rady Ministrów 18 XII 1922–26 V 1923 (Polish National Policies: Agreements and Declarations from My Tenure as Prime Minister, 18 December 1922 to 26 May 1923), 1923.
- Podstawy organizacji naczelnych władz wojskowych w Polsce (Basic Organization of the Supreme Military Authorities in Poland), 1923.
- Polesie jako węzeł strategiczny wschodniego frontu (Polesie as a Strategic Node of the Eastern Front), 1924.
- La campagne polono-russe de 1920 (French: The Polish-Russian Campaign of 1920), 1928.
- Polska i Francja w przeszłości i w dobie współczesnej (Poland and France in the Past and in the Present Day), 1931.
- Przyszła wojna – jej możliwości i charakter oraz związane z nimi zagadnienia obrony kraju (War in the Future: Its Capacities and Character and Associated Questions of National Defense), 1934; translated into French in 1934, and into English. 1943.in 1943; latest edition Warsaw, MON, 1972.

Some of his works have been collected in:

- Generał Władysław Sikorski: Publicystyka generała Władysława Sikorskiego na łamach Kuriera Warszawskiego w latach 1928–1939 (General Władysław Sikorski: Articles by General Władysław Sikorski in the Warsaw Courier, 1928–1939), Oficyna Wydawnicza Aspra, 1999, ISBN 83-908937-3-8.

== See also ==
- Intermarium: World War II and after
- Prometheism: Second period (1921–1923)

== Notes ==
a For a detailed analysis of the size of Polish forces, in comparison to other allies, see note a in the Polish contribution to World War II article.

Political offices
Preceded by Julian Nowak	Prime Minister of Poland; 1922–1923	Succeeded by Wincenty Witos
Preceded by Felicjan Sławoj-Składkowski (Prime Minister in Poland)	Prime Minister of the Republic of Poland; 1939–1943	Succeeded by Stanisław Mikołajczyk
Military offices
Preceded by Edward Rydz-Śmigły	General Inspector of the Armed Forces; 1939–1943	Succeeded by Kazimierz Sosnkowski
