= Gmina Paprotnia =

Gmina Paprotnia Paprotnia Commune
- Gmina
- Interactive map of Gmina Paprotnia
- Coordinates (Paprotnia): 52°18′N 22°28′E
- Country: Poland
- Voivodeship: Masovian
- County: Siedlce County
- Seat: Paprotnia

Area
  - Total: 81.43 km^{2} (31.44 sq mi)

Population (2014)
  - Total: 2,675
  - Density: 32.85/km^{2} (85.08/sq mi)

Gmina Paprotnia is a rural gmina (administrative district) in Siedlce County, Masovian Voivodeship, in east-central Poland. Its seat is the village of Paprotnia, which lies approximately 19 kilometres (12 mi) north-east of Siedlce and 99 km (61 mi) east of Warsaw.

The gmina covers an area of 81.43 square kilometres (31.4 sq mi), and as of 2006 its total population is 2,797 (2,675 in 2104).

== Villages ==
Gmina Paprotnia contains the villages and settlements of Czarnoty, Grabowiec, Hołubla, Kaliski, Kobylany-Kozy, Koryciany, Krynki, Łęczycki, Łozy, Nasiłów, Paprotnia, Pliszki, Pluty, Podawce, Rzeszotków, Skwierczyn Lacki, Stare Trębice, Stasin, Strusy, Trębice Dolne, Trębice Górne and Uziębły.

== Neighbouring gminas ==
Gmina Paprotnia is bordered by the gminas of Bielany, Korczew, Mordy, Przesmyki, Repki and Suchożebry.
