= Babicha =

- Village
- Location within Poland
- Coordinates: 50°23′N 21°26′E
- Country: Poland
- Voivodeship: Subcarpathian
- County: Mielec
- Gmina: Tuszów Narodowy

Babicha [baˈbixa] is a village in the administrative district of Gmina Tuszów Narodowy, within Mielec County, Subcarpathian Voivodeship, in south-eastern Poland.
