= Sarnów, Podkarpackie Voivodeship =

Sarnów
- Village
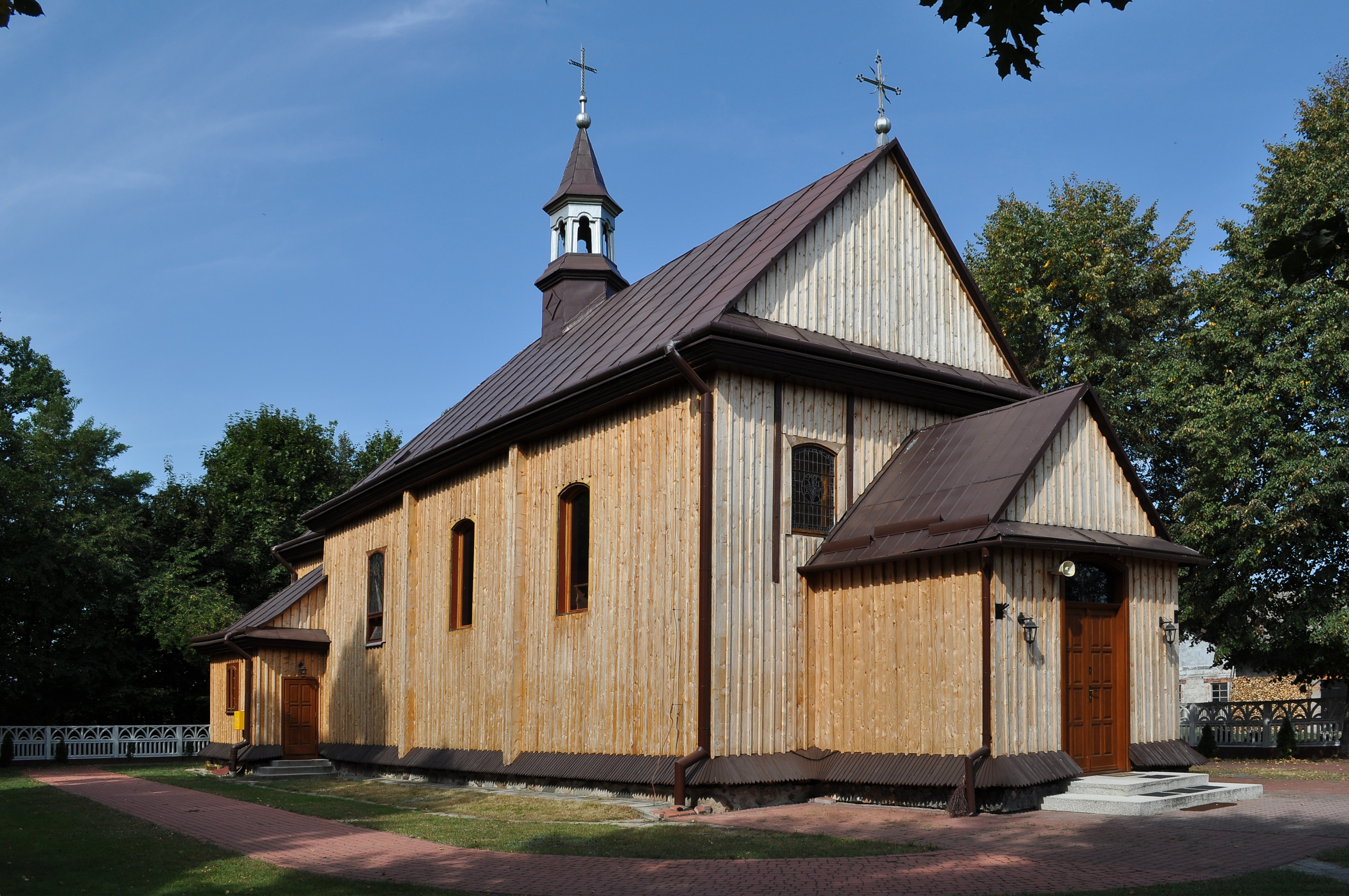
- Sacred Heart church (Catholic, formerly Lutheran)

- Location within Poland
- Coordinates: 50°21′N 21°32′E
- Country: Poland
- Voivodeship: Subcarpathian
- County: Mielec
- Gmina: Tuszów Narodowy
- Established: 1783

Sarnów [ˈsarnuf] is a village in the administrative district of Gmina Tuszów Narodowy, within Mielec County, Subcarpathian Voivodeship, in south-eastern Poland.

The village was established in the course of Josephine colonization by German Lutheran and Calvinist settlers in 1783. They build a church which became a religious centre of Protestants in the nearby colonies. In 1867 the seat of the parish was moved to Czermin, Podkarpackie Voivodeship.
