= Uziębły =

- Village
- Location within Poland
- Coordinates: 52°17′N 22°23′E
- Country: Poland
- Voivodeship: Masovian
- County: Siedlce
- Gmina: Paprotnia

Uziębły [uˈʑɛmbwɨ] is a village in the administrative district of Gmina Paprotnia, within Siedlce County, Masovian Voivodeship, near the eastern border of central Poland.
