= Jaślany =

- Village
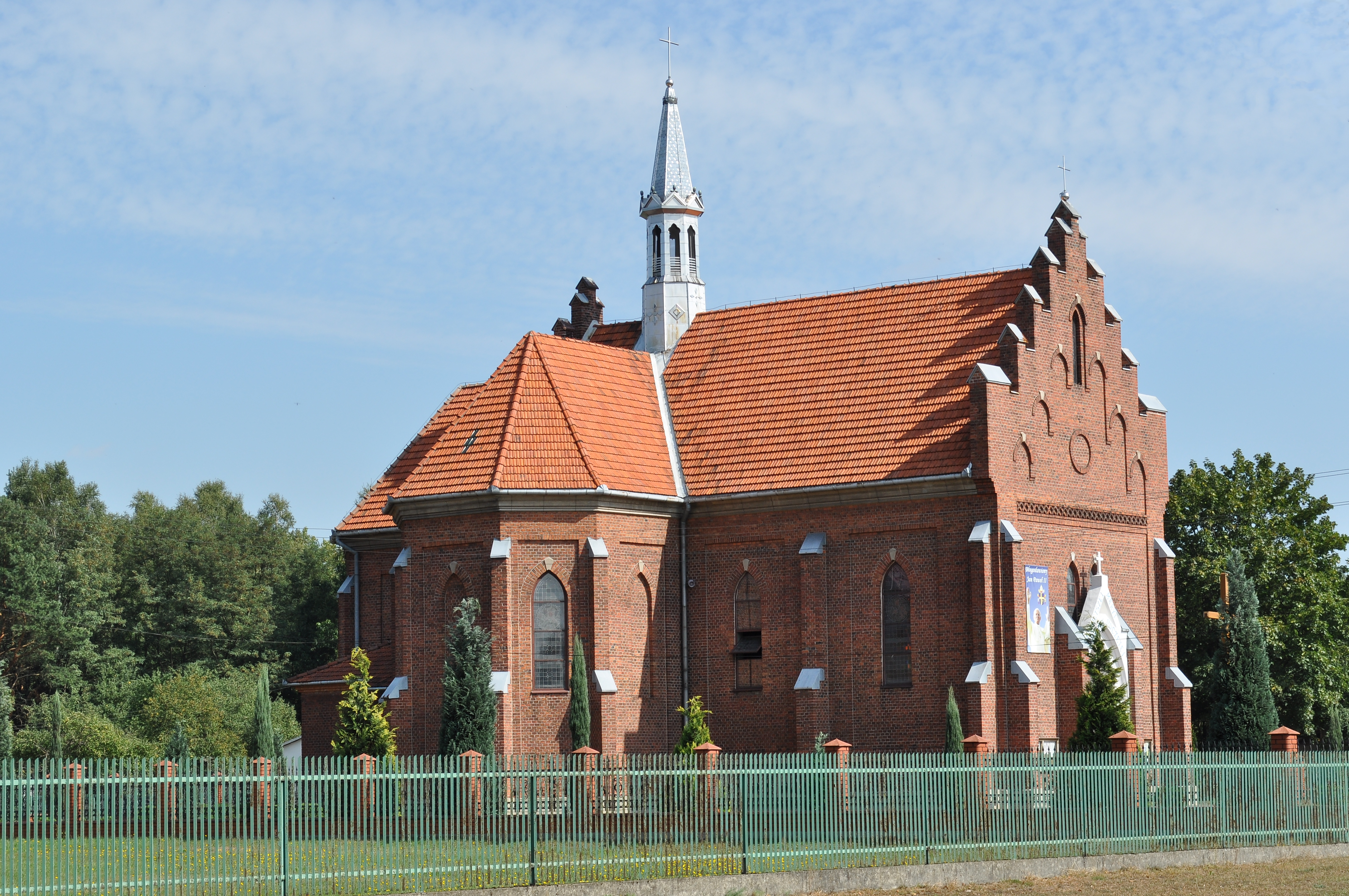
- Immaculate Conception church

- Location within Poland
- Coordinates: 50°24′N 21°29′E
- Country: Poland
- Voivodeship: Subcarpathian
- County: Mielec
- Gmina: Tuszów Narodowy
- Time zone: UTC+1 (CET)
  - Summer (DST): UTC+2 (CEST)
- Vehicle registration: RMI

Jaślany [jaˈɕlanɨ] is a village in the administrative district of Gmina Tuszów Narodowy, within Mielec County, Subcarpathian Voivodeship, in south-eastern Poland.

Five Polish citizens were murdered by Nazi Germany in the village during World War II.
