= Malinie, Podkarpackie Voivodeship =

Malinie
- Village
- Location within Poland
- Coordinates: 50°21′N 21°28′E
- Country: Poland
- Voivodeship: Subcarpathian
- County: Mielec
- Gmina: Tuszów Narodowy

Malinie [maˈliɲɛ] is a village in the administrative district of Gmina Tuszów Narodowy, within Mielec County, Subcarpathian Voivodeship, in south-eastern Poland.

Malinie as a royal village was established in 1453. From 1494 year the village belonged to Bernard Baranowski. In 1853, the school was founded in Malinie common. The only monument in the court Malinie Tarnowski, the last owners Malinie, 1920 and manor park with an area of 2 ha. Currently Tarnowski court and park are owned by WIBO Recycling Ltd. where its offices are located.

In 1900 the mill was founded Malinie. After the Second World War, the mill was nationalized, and in 1980 purchased by the former owner. In 2008, after the merger of the transport company formed a comprehensive company engaged in the processing of cereals from a transport.

In 1975-1998 the town of the regional capital Rzeszów.

By Malina runs provincial road 985 and railway line 25.
