= Skwierczyn Lacki =

- Village
- Location within Poland
- Coordinates: 52°19′N 22°26′E
- Country: Poland
- Voivodeship: Masovian
- County: Siedlce
- Gmina: Paprotnia

Skwierczyn Lacki [ˈskfjɛrt͡ʂɨn ˈlat͡ski] is a village in the administrative district of Gmina Paprotnia, within Siedlce County, Masovian Voivodeship, in east-central Poland.
