= Paprotnia, Siedlce County =

Paprotnia
- Village
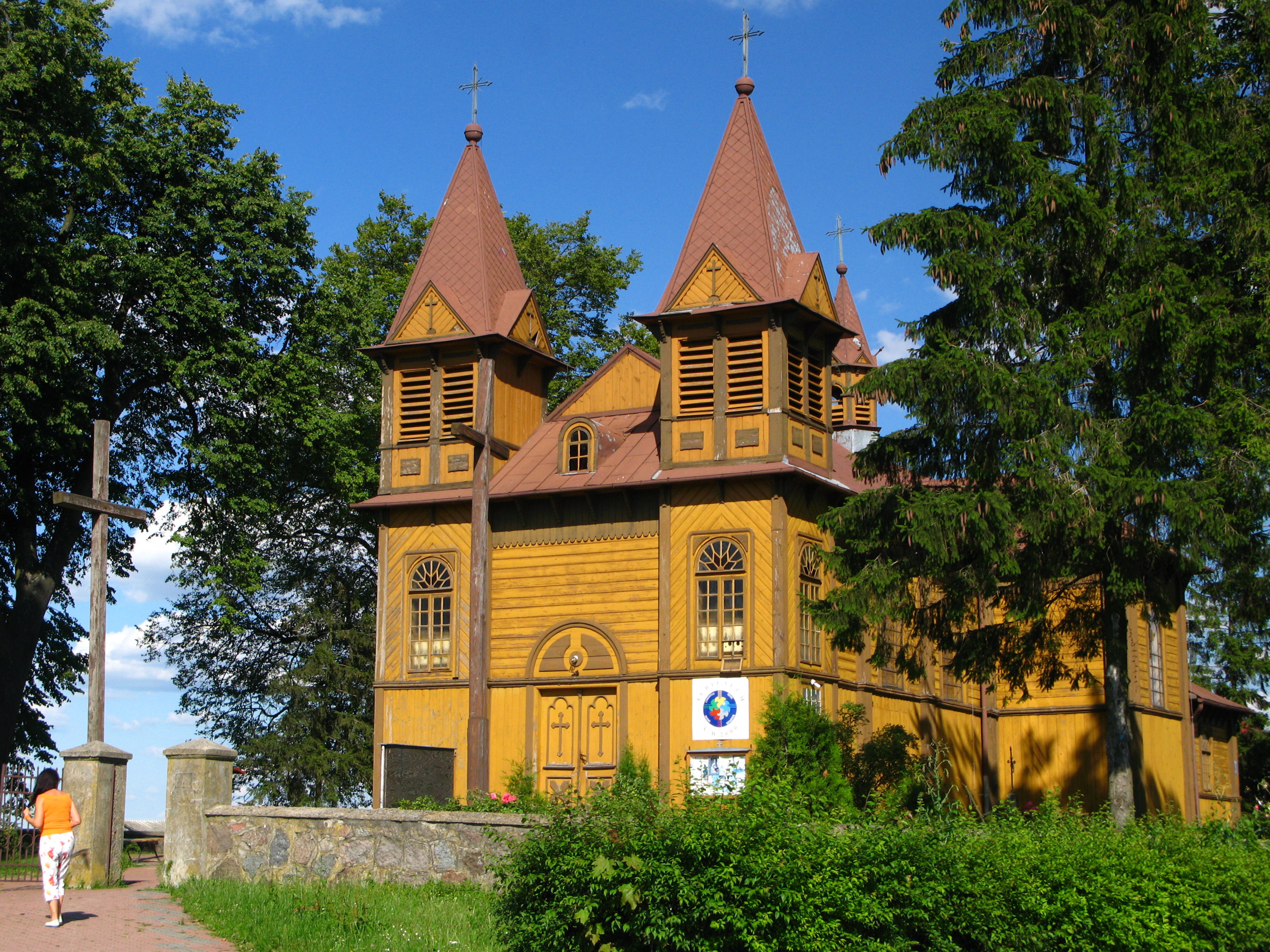

- Location within Poland
- Coordinates: 52°18′N 22°28′E
- Country: Poland
- Voivodeship: Masovian
- County: Siedlce
- Gmina: Paprotnia

Paprotnia [paˈprɔtɲa] is a village in Siedlce County, Masovian Voivodeship, in east-central Poland. It is the seat of the gmina (administrative district) called Gmina Paprotnia.
