= Trębice Górne =

- Village
- Location within Poland
- Coordinates: 52°18′41″N 22°31′18″E
- Country: Poland
- Voivodeship: Masovian
- County: Siedlce
- Gmina: Paprotnia

Trębice Górne [trɛmˈbit͡sɛ ˈɡurnɛ] is a village in the administrative district of Gmina Paprotnia, within Siedlce County, Masovian Voivodeship, in east-central Poland.
