= Stare Trębice =

Village in Gmina Paprotnia, Poland

- Village
- Location within Poland
- Coordinates: 52°19′25″N 22°30′54″E
- Country: Poland
- Voivodeship: Masovian
- County: Siedlce
- Gmina: Paprotnia

Stare Trębice [ˈstarɛ trɛmˈbit͡sɛ] is a village in the administrative district of Gmina Paprotnia, within Siedlce County, Masovian Voivodeship, in east-central Poland.
