= Tuszów Narodowy =

- Village
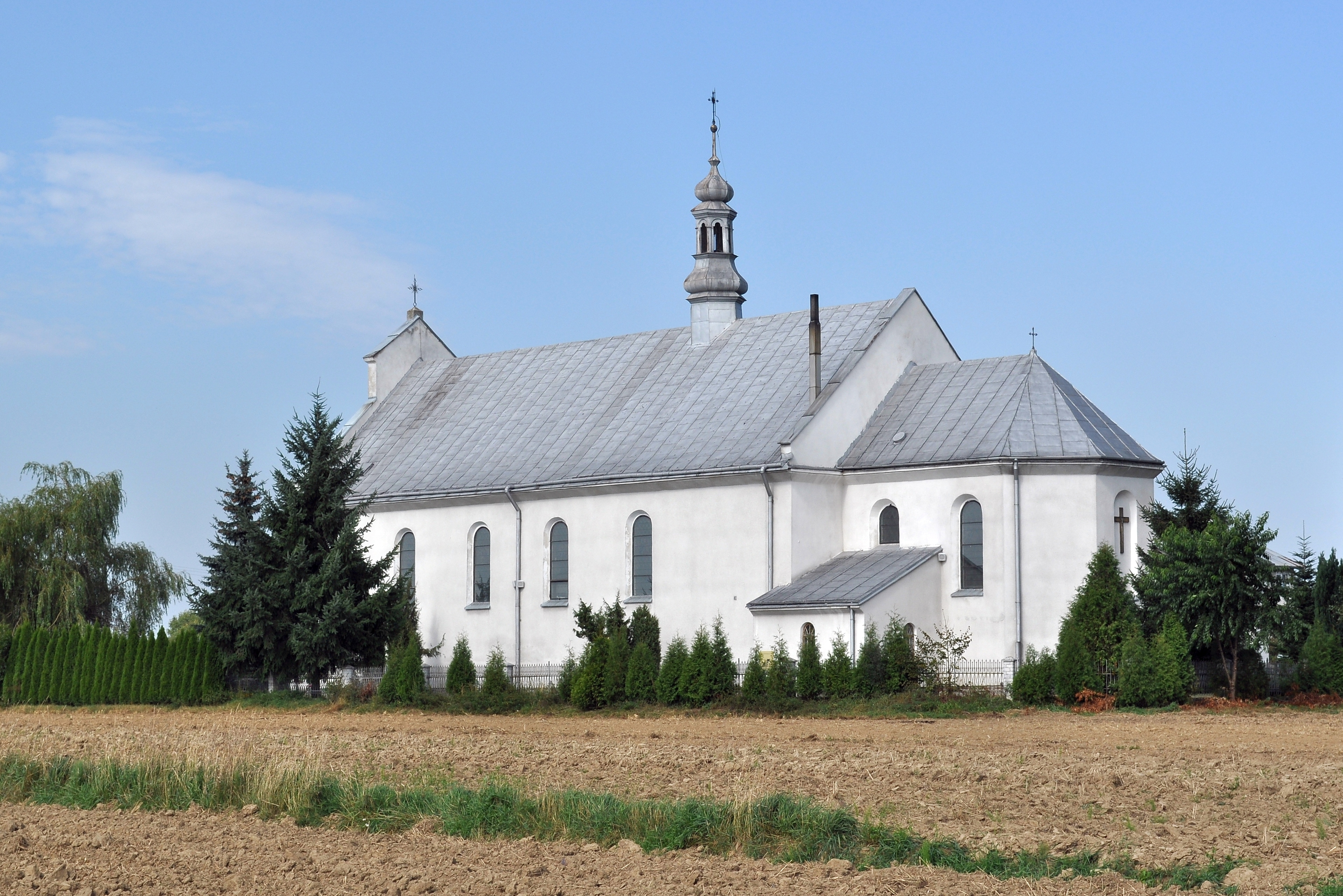
- Church of Our Lady of Help

- Location within Poland
- Coordinates: 50°22′N 21°28′E
- Country: Poland
- Voivodeship: Subcarpathian
- County: Mielec
- Gmina: Tuszów Narodowy

Population
  - Total: 920
- Time zone: UTC+1 (CET)
  - Summer (DST): UTC+2 (CEST)
- Vehicle registration: RMI

Tuszów Narodowy [ˈtuʂuf narɔˈdɔvɨ] is a village in Mielec County, Subcarpathian Voivodeship, in south-eastern Poland. It is the seat of the gmina (administrative district) called Gmina Tuszów Narodowy.

It was the birthplace of General Władysław Sikorski.

Four Polish citizens were murdered by Nazi Germany in the village during World War II.
