= Rybička (knife) =

Czech pocket knife with a fish-shaped handle

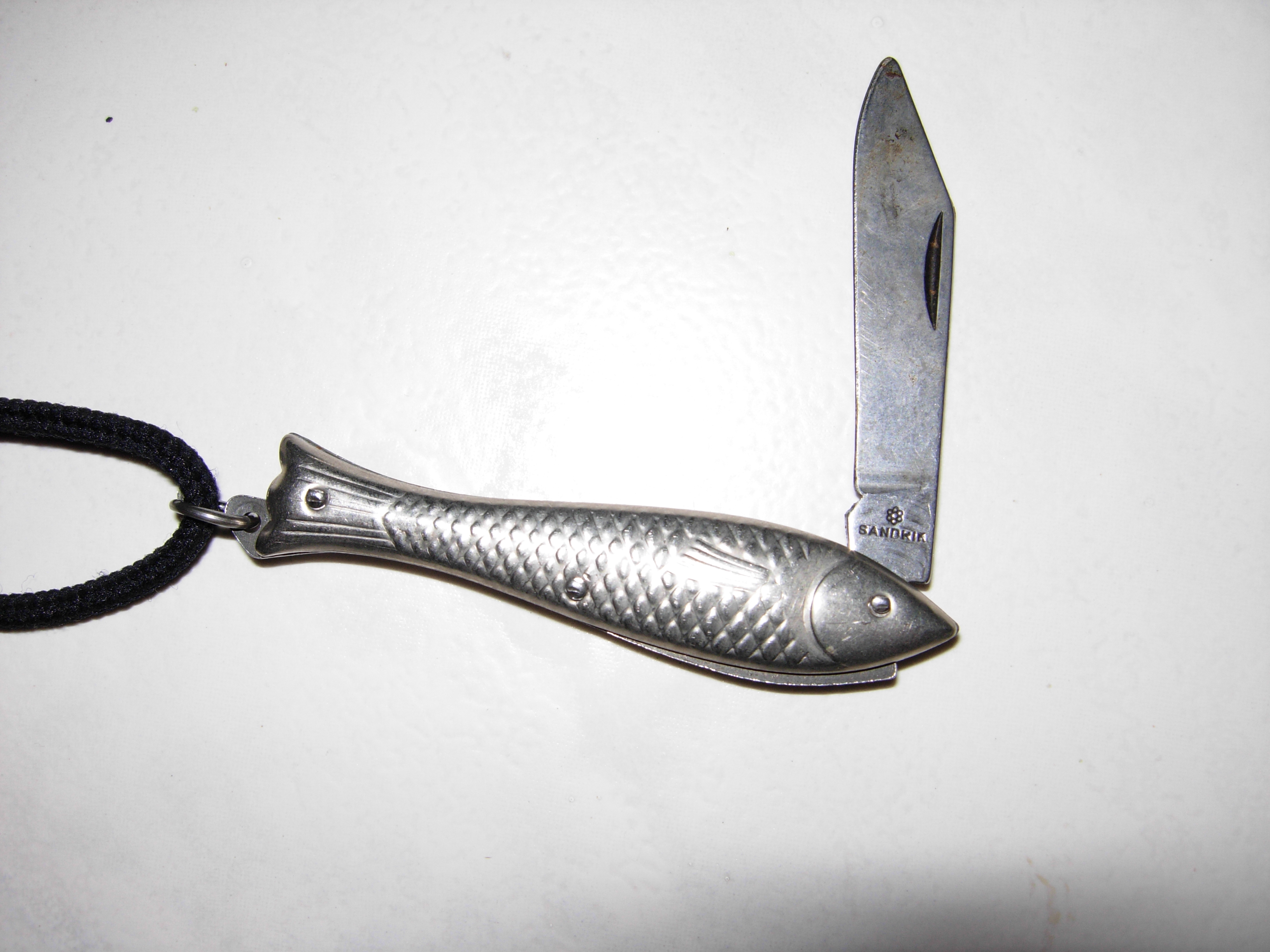
Rybička produced by the Slovak company Sandrik

Rybička (English: Little Fish) is a small Czech pocket knife with the handle shaped as a fish. It has been produced since the first decades of the 20th century. The knife was particularly popular during the period of socialism in Czechoslovakia. It was valued as a simple and small tool used for mushroom picking, a traditional Czech hobby.

== History ==
The design of the Rybička knife apparently originates from the production of the cutlery workshop of Jan Maixner, however, it gained popularity only after Ignaz Rösler took over the company. The oldest catalogue with the knife shaped as a fish is approximately 80 years old (as of 2014), however, some sources suggest that the design is only about 60 years old (produced since 1947–1955). During the second half of the 20th century, a part of the production moved to Slovakia, under the sister company Sandrik. The knives were identical, only the sign on the blade was different.

During an exhibition of knives in Prague in 2005, Rybička received honorable mention as "the most famous knife of Czechoslovakia". The company also produces various collector's series and luxury variants of the knife.
