= Little Fish Lake Provincial Park =

Provincial park in Alberta, Canada

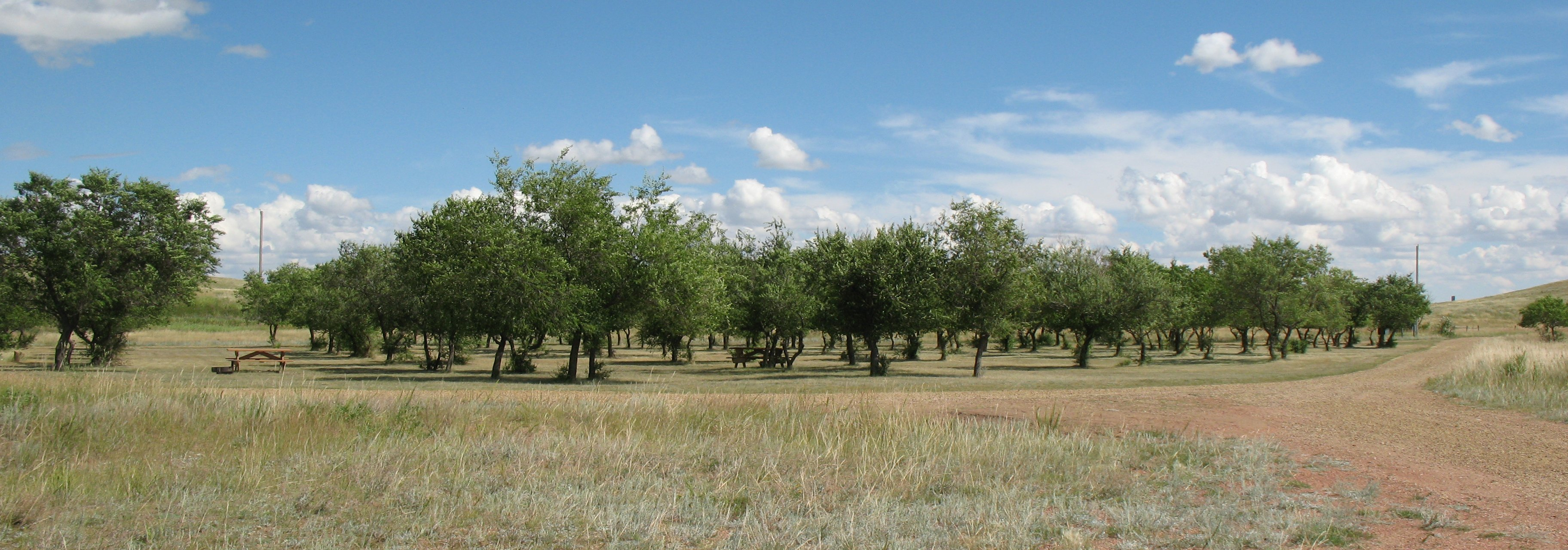
- Little Fish Lake Provincial Park campsite
- Interactive map of Little Fish Lake Provincial Park
- Location: Special Area No. 2, Alberta Canada
- Nearest city: Drumheller
- Coordinates: 51°22′22″N 112°11′57″W
- Area: 1.1 km^{2} (0.42 sq mi)
- Established: April 08, 1957
- Governing body: Alberta Tourism, Parks and Recreation

Little Fish Lake Provincial Park is a provincial park in Alberta, Canada, located 43 km (27 mi) east of Drumheller on the shore of Little Fish Lake.

The park is situated at an elevation of 910 m (2,990 ft) and has an area of 1.1 km^{2} (0.42 sq mi). It was established on April 8, 1957, and is maintained by Alberta Tourism, Parks and Recreation.

== Activities ==
Camping is available in the park in the "Little Fish Lake" overnight camping ground.

== Gallery ==
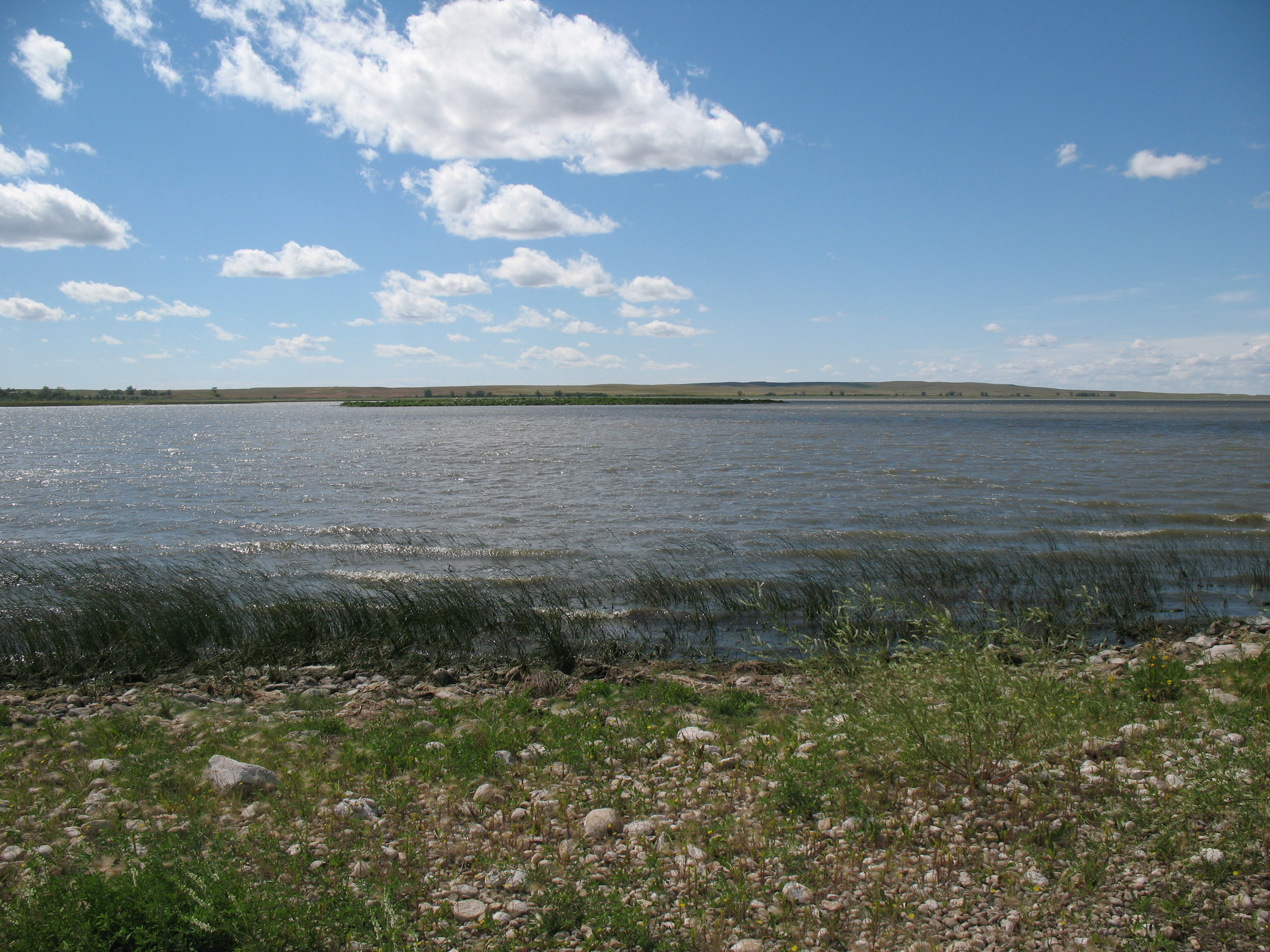
Little Fish Lake

== See also ==
- List of provincial parks in Alberta
- List of Canadian provincial parks
- List of Canadian national parks
