= Pluty, Gmina Paprotnia =

Pluty
- Village
- Location within Poland
- Coordinates: 52°17′19″N 22°28′48″E
- Country: Poland
- Voivodeship: Masovian
- County: Siedlce
- Gmina: Paprotnia

Pluty [ˈplutɨ] is a village in the administrative district of Gmina Paprotnia, within Siedlce County, Masovian Voivodeship, in east-central Poland.
