= Kaliski, Gmina Paprotnia =

Kaliski
- Village
- Location within Poland
- Coordinates: 52°19′04″N 22°28′12″E
- Country: Poland
- Voivodeship: Masovian
- County: Siedlce
- Gmina: Paprotnia

Kaliski [kaˈliski] is a village in the administrative district of Gmina Paprotnia, within Siedlce County, Masovian Voivodeship, in east-central Poland.
