= Little Fish Lake =

Lake in Alberta, Canada

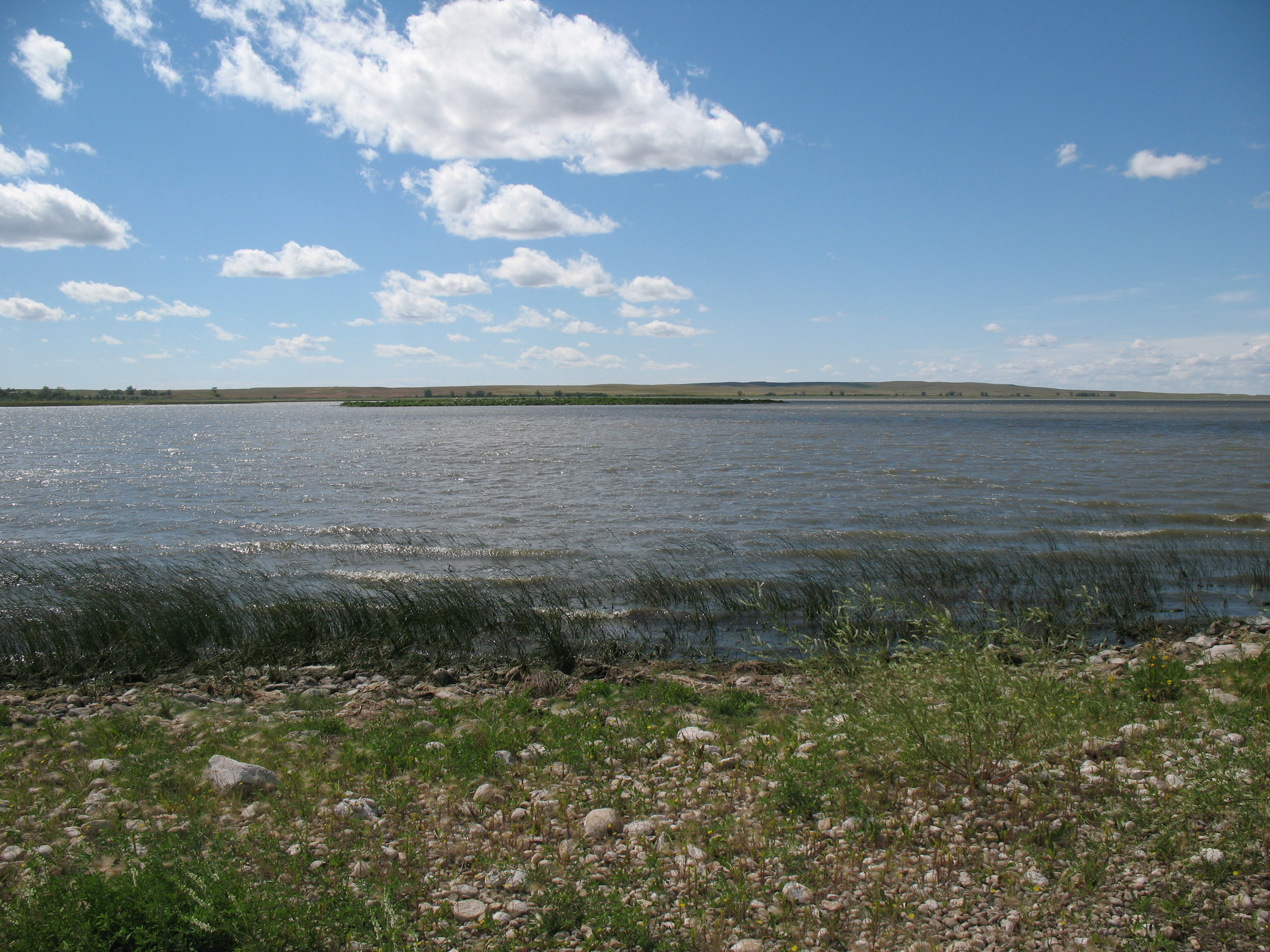

- Location within Alberta
- Location: Special Area No. 2, Alberta
- Coordinates: 51°22′38″N 112°14′01″W
- Basin countries: Canada
- Max. length: 2.2 km (1.4 mi)
- Max. width: 4.1 km (2.5 mi)
- Surface area: 7.09 km^{2} (2.74 sq mi)
- Average depth: 1.76 m (5 ft 9 in)
- Max. depth: 3 m (9.8 ft)
- Surface elevation: 897 m (2,943 ft)
- References: Little Fish Lake

Little Fish Lake is a lake in Alberta. It is located 43 km east from Drumheller in Little Fish Lake Provincial Park.
