= Ocieka =

- Village
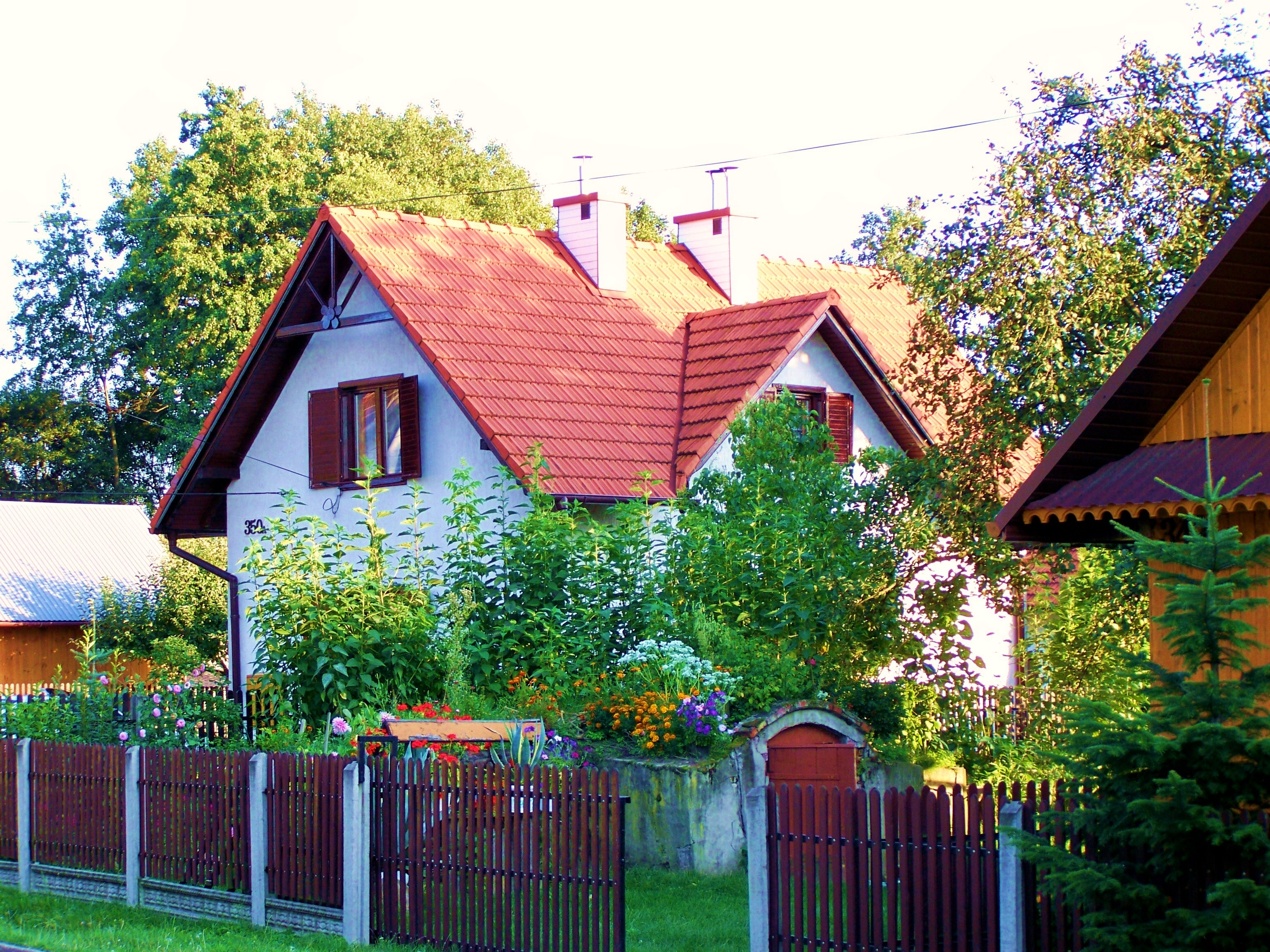
- Traditional House in Ocieka Village

- Location within Poland
- Coordinates: 50°8′N 21°35′E
- Country: Poland
- Voivodeship: Subcarpathian
- County: Ropczyce-Sędziszów
- Gmina: Ostrów
- Population: 1,233

Ocieka [ɔˈt͡ɕɛka] is a village in the administrative district of Gmina Ostrów, within Ropczyce-Sędziszów County, Subcarpathian Voivodeship, in south-eastern Poland. The village lies on the main road between Ropczyce and Mielec. It is situated in the Sandomierz Forest (Polish: Puszcza Sandomierska), one of the biggest forests in southern Poland, which covers large parts of the Sandomierz Basin, an areas was once popular with Polish nobility (Polish: Szlachta) for hunting and fishing. Ocieka lies on the Tuszymka river, a tributary of the Wisłoka river. In the past this area was known for iron smelting and iron goods.

== History ==
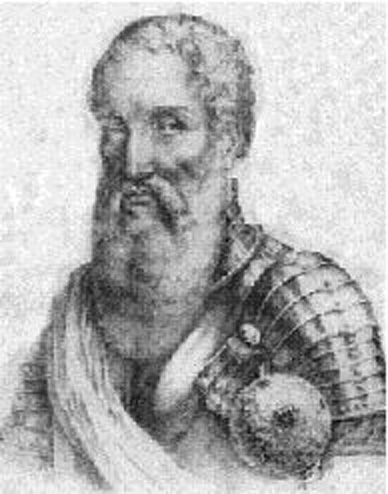
Hetman Jan Tarnowski.

Since its formation in the late 15th century Ocieka has been known by several different names; although these appear to be phonetic variations of the same name. Parish documents and chronicles show it as ‘Otsijeka’, ‘Odszycha’ and ‘Ucieka’. The village was named by Anna née Ocieska Mielecka and it is probably the ancestral seat of the ‘Ocieskis’, who also owned Rzemień, a village to the north of Ocieka. In the 15th century the area was popular with Polish nobility (Polish: Szlachta) for hunting. The Polish king Władysław II Jagiełło was said to be a frequent visitor to the area, listing it as one of his ‘favourite’ places for ‘hunting and recuperation’. According to a local legend, in the region near Ocieka there occurred a battle against the Tatars. The Polish knights achieved a resounding victory. To commemorate this, a hill close by became known as ‘Góra Tatarska’ (Tatar Hill). In 1531 the Grand Crown Hetman, Jan Amor Tarnowski led a Polish army against the Moldavian Prince (‘Hospodar’) Petru IV Rareş (Polish: ‘Piotr Raresz’) in the Battle of Obertyn. Despite being outnumbered four to one, the battle ended with a Polish victory, a complete Tatar surrender, and the reconquest of Pokuttya or ‘Pokuttia’ (Ukrainian: Покуття, Romanian: Pocuţia, Polish: Pokucie). Tarnowski brought his Tatar prisoners-of-war back to Ocieka. These prisoners became the first occupants of a new settlement near Ocieka called ‘Sadykierz’. The name ‘Sadykierz’ has distinct Tatar origins, just as do today's inhabitants of the same village (The original settlement of ‘Sadykierz’ was located by a post-glacial lake, home to a rare species of white water-lily.)

Ocieka became an independent parish in 1610. At this time, Ocieka had a very industrial character; tar and wood charcoal was manufactured here, as was iron. In the 17th and 18th centuries there was a glass foundry nearby. At this time the ownership of the village passed from the ‘Ocieski’ family to the ‘Romerów’ (or ‘Romer’) family.

Ocieka, a village on the stream Ocieka or Ociecki (part of the Tuszymka river), in the county (‘powiat’) of Ropczyce, lies in a sandy lowland (206 m), along with Wola Ocieska and Zadzikierz. To the north it is surrounded by a large pine forest, the southern part of which is called ‘Spalony las′ (‘burnt forest′), the northern part ‘Sokolny las′ (‘falcon forest′); to the east is the forest of the village of Kamionka, and to the south part of the forests of the village of Ostrów, ‘Duży las′ (‘large forest′), Saszczyński and Sarni (‘deer's’) las. In the middle of the village, near the church, runs the Kolbuszowa-Ropczyce highway, from which a branch runs west, and in Dąbie (8 km (5 mi) away) on the Wisłoka river, it joins the main highway from Rzochów to Dębica. The outlying settlement of Zadzikierz lies to the northeast (3 km), near the forest on the northeast flank of a hill (245 m) (this now appears to be the place now called Sadykierz). Wola Ocieska (today called Wola Ociecka), which has a beautiful manor house, is northwest of Ocieka, on the road to Dąbie, on the northwest flank of the wooded Łysa górka (211 m). Between Ocieka and Zadzikierz there are four small ponds, and on the stream a watermill and a windmill.

With these outlying settlements the village has 1,465 Roman Catholic inhabitants, of whom 127 live on the grounds of the major estate, owned by Count Władyslaw Romer. The major estate has 756 mórgs of farmland (1 mórg ≈ 0.56 ha), 52 of meadows and gardens, 89 of pastures, and 1,678 of forests; the minor estate has 1,948 mórgs of farmland, 388 of meadows, 479 of pastures, and 343 of forests. The pastures are mostly sandy waste-land. The parish church is old and made of wood, of unknown funding, and contains sacramental registers dating from 1785. The parish includes Blizna, with 233 inhabitants; there are 37 Jews in the parish. There is a people's school here, and a fund for the poor, which has 500 zł. in austrian currency.

The Reverend Franciszek Siarczyński (in a manuscript in the Ossolineum library, N°. 1826), says that this village belonged to Rzemień and that Anna née Ocieska Mielecka named it, but adds that it is probably the ancestral seat of the Ocieskis, who also owned Rzemień. The villages nearest Ocieka are, to the east, Zdżary and Kamionka, to the south Ostrów, to the west Pustków-Krownice and Dąbie, to the north Blizna. (extracts translated from the 1886 edition of ‘Słownik Geograficzny Królestwa Polskiego’)

=== World War II ===
During the Second World War, Ocieka was in the middle of SS military-controlled region Heidelager. A large SS-officer training centre SS-Truppenübungsplatz Heidelager and on-site concentration camp were located in Pustków Osiedle 6 kilometres (3.7 miles) west of Ocieka. The secret Nazi V-2 missile launch site was located 6 kilometres (3.7 miles) to the northeast in Blizna. The church in Ocieka was converted into a warehouse, for the storage of specialist V-1 and V-2 test-rocket materials. Its sacristy was used as an office for SS officers, including Wernher von Braun, who from 5 November 1943 until early July 1944, led a team of German scientists developing and firing V-2 missiles at the secret launch site in nearby Blizna

== Gallery ==
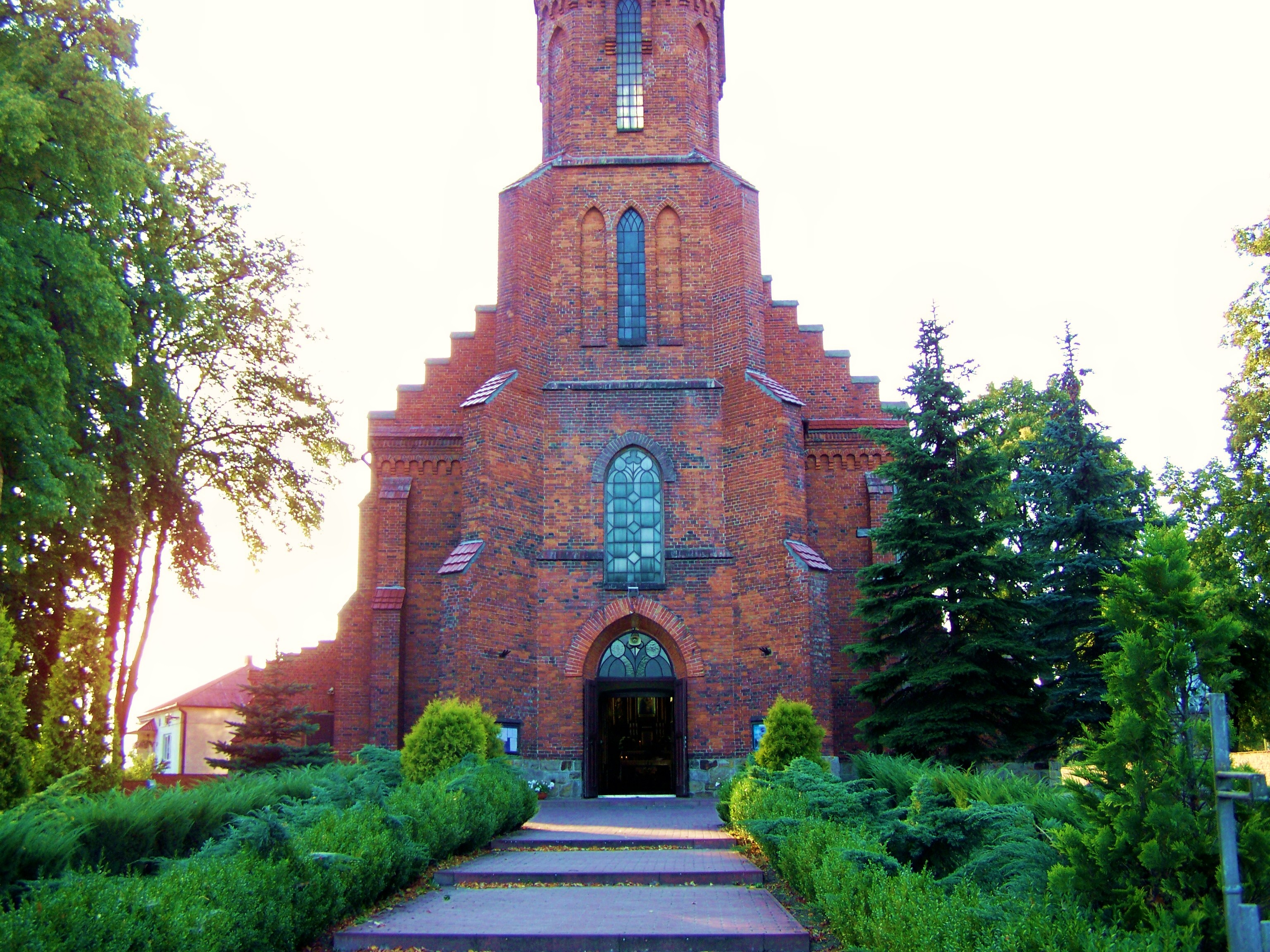
Church of Saint Catherine in Ocieka

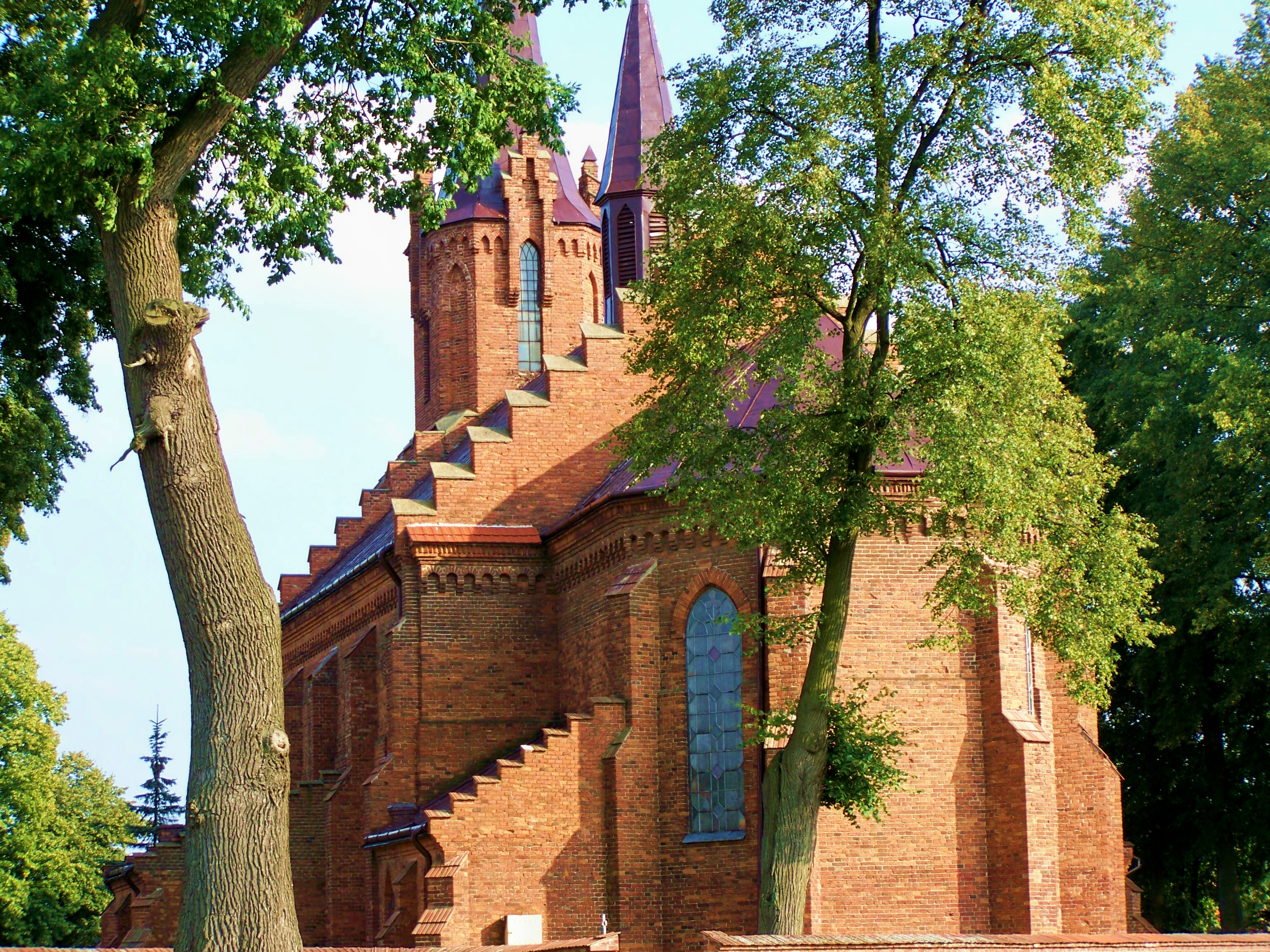
Church of Saint Catherine in Ocieka

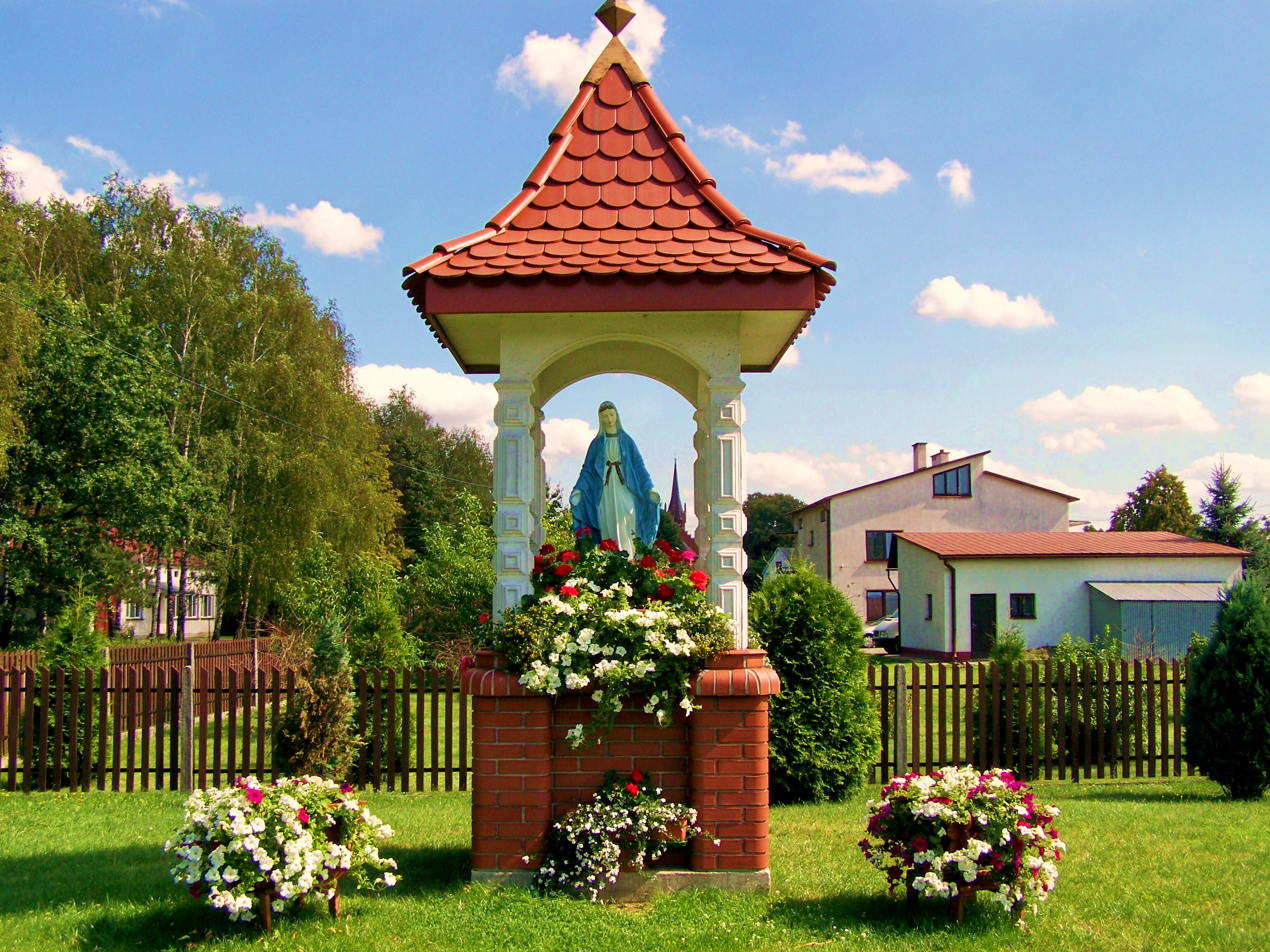
Shrine to the Virgin Mary in Ocieka

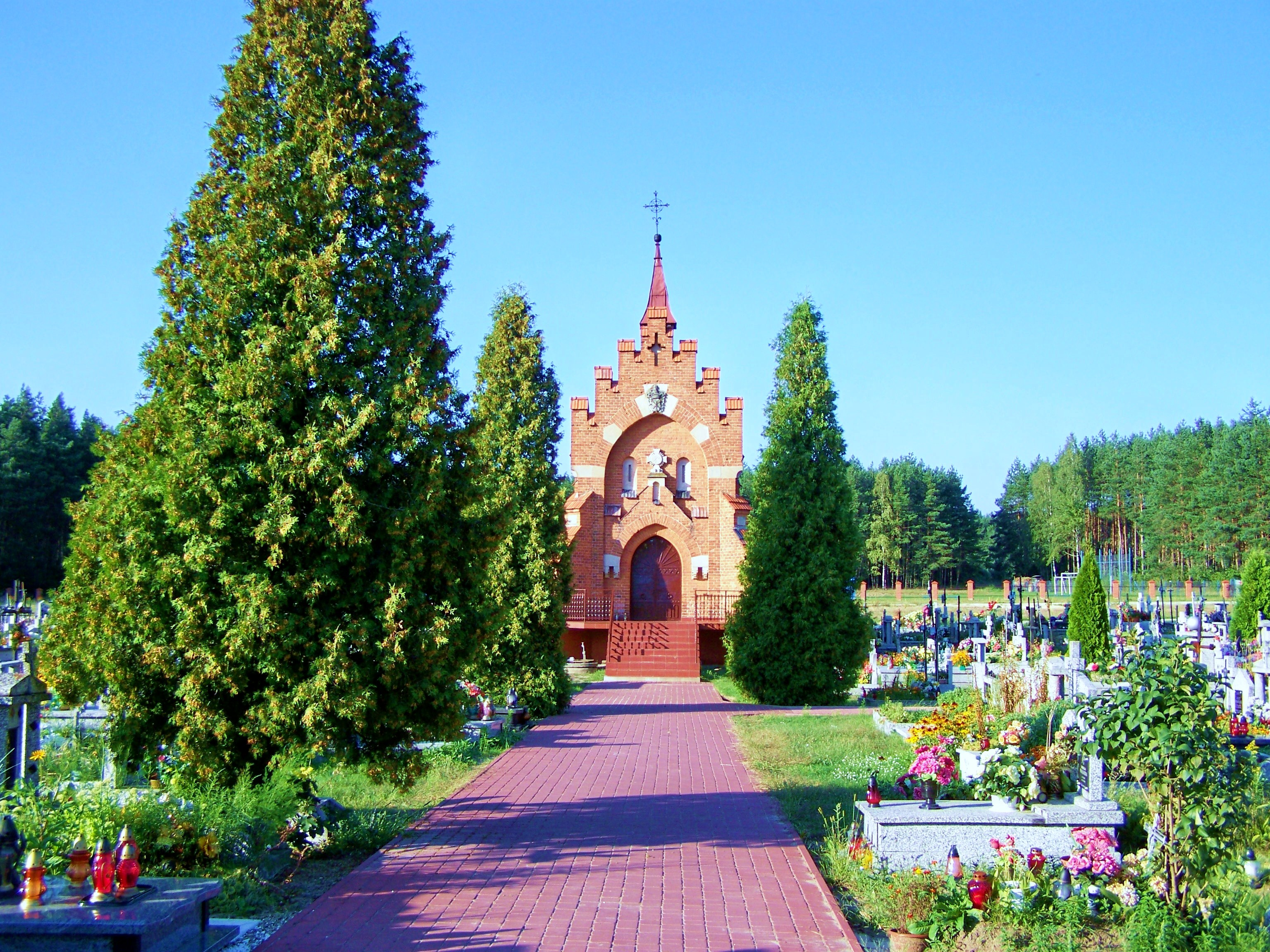
Cemetery in Ocieka

== See also ==
- SS-Truppenübungsplatz Heidelager SS Military training complex and concentration camp in Pustków Osiedle
- Blizna V-2 missile launch site
- Shrines to the Virgin Mary

== Notes ==
1.Between 1975–1998 Ocieka was in the Rzeszów Voivodeship.
