= Tuszymka =

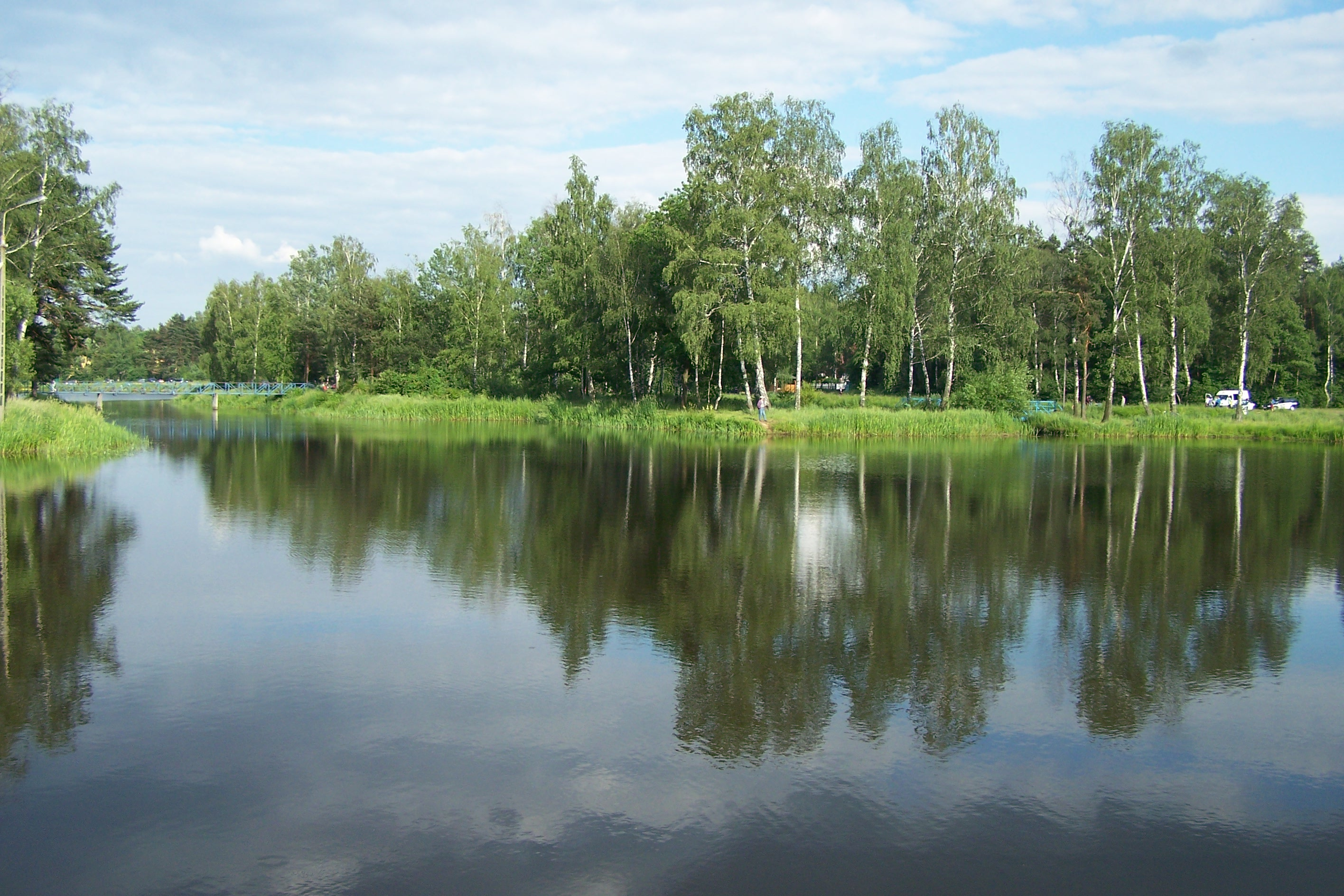
- Lake in Kamionka

Location
- Country: Poland

Physical characteristics
- Mouth
  - location: Wisłoka
  - coordinates: 50.1715°N 21.4835°E

Basin features
- Progression: Wisłoka→ Vistula→ Baltic Sea

Tuszymka is a river in south-eastern Poland, a tributary of the Wisłoka river, with a length of 38.2 kilometres (24 mi). The source of the river is near the village of Bukowiec. The river runs near the village of Kamionka where there is a lake.

== Towns and villages around Tuszymka ==
Ruda; Kamionka	Ocieka; Wola Ociecka	Dąbie; Bratkowice	Błonie

== See also ==
- Rivers of Poland
