= Rzemień, Podkarpackie Voivodeship =

Rzemień
- Village
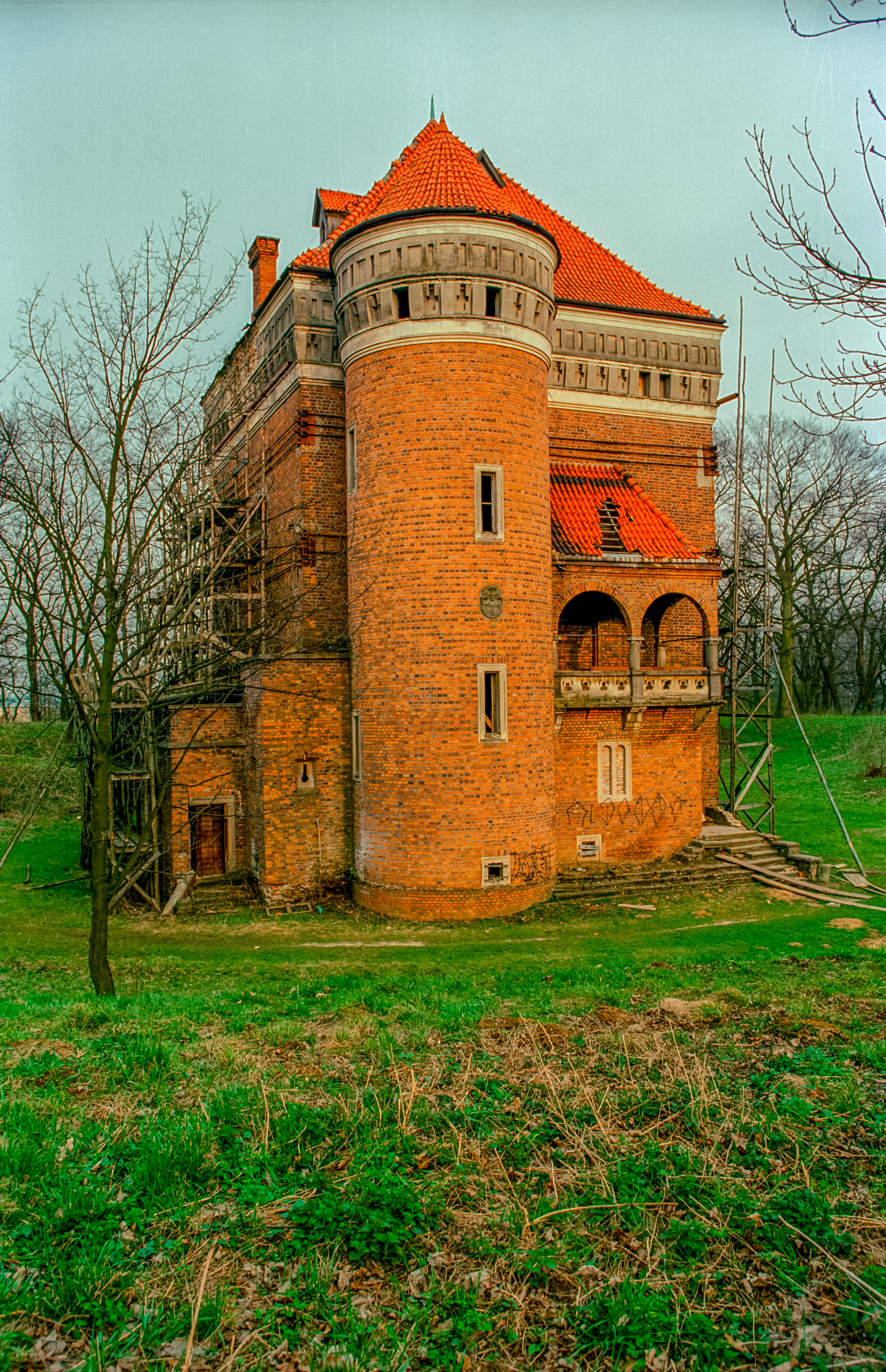
- Fortification in Rzemień

- Location within Poland
- Coordinates: 50°13′N 21°31′E
- Country: Poland
- Voivodeship: Subcarpathian
- County: Mielec
- Gmina: Przecław

Rzemień [ˈʐɛmjɛɲ] is a village in the administrative district of Gmina Przecław, within Mielec County, Subcarpathian Voivodeship, in south-eastern Poland. Rzemień is situated in the valley of the Wisłoka River. It has a large windmill and a large park in which stands an interesting example of early fortification, a tall square building, with 2 meter thick walls.

== History ==
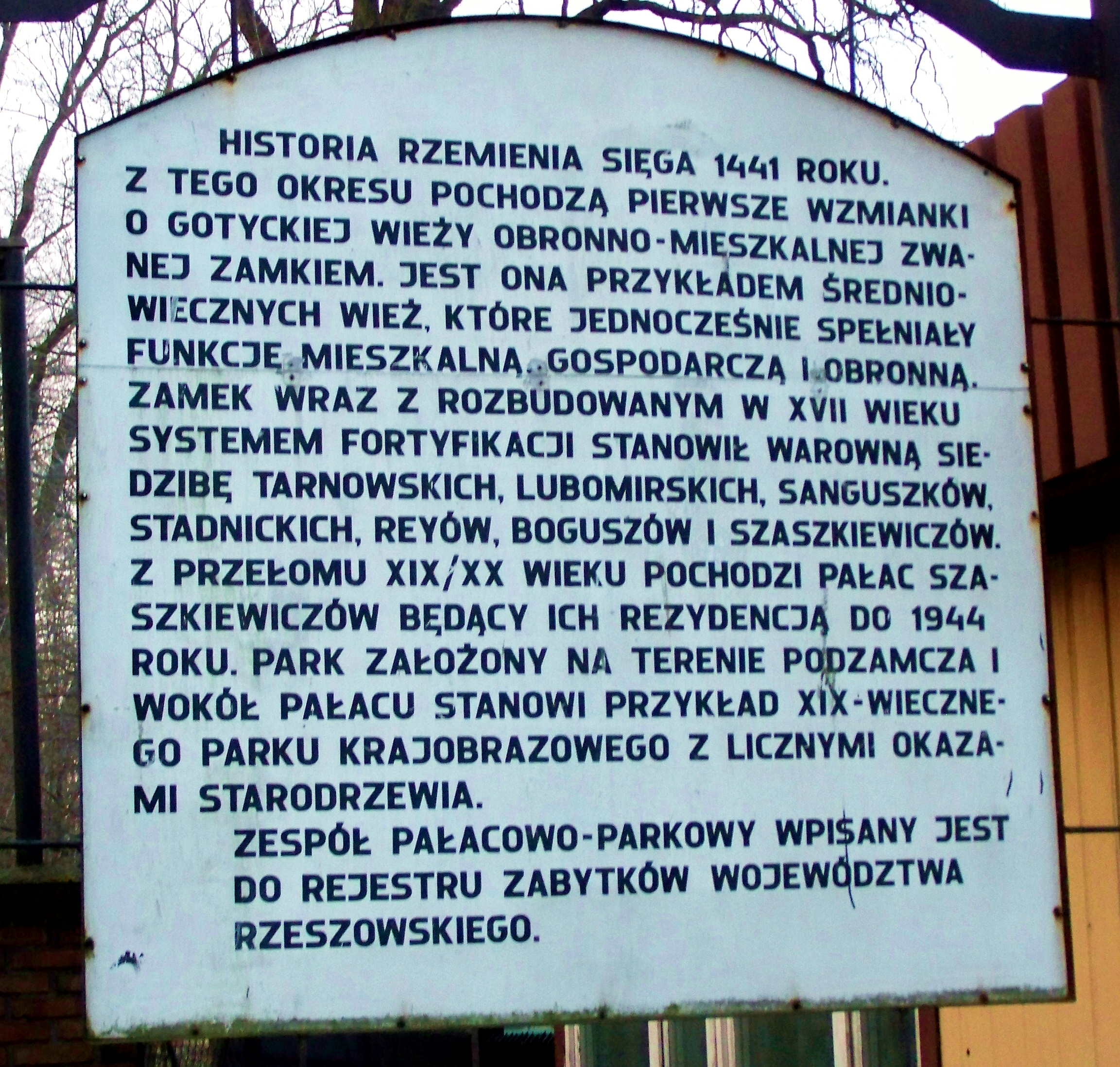
Sign providing information about the history of Rzemień (in Polish)

The fortification is said to have been built by Stanisław Tarnowski in 1526. A manuscript (Document N°. 1826), by the Reverend Franciszek Siarczyński in the Ossolineum library, in Wrocław, Poland records that this village belonged a family called Ocieski, who were major landowners in the area (also owning Ocieka and Wola Ociecka). In 1616 the castle fortification ownership passed to the Lubomirski family, who in 1620–1640 modernised it with the most up-to-date defences.
