= Biały Bór (disambiguation) =

Biały Bór may refer to the following places:

- Biały Bór, Kuyavian-Pomeranian Voivodeship (north-central Poland)
- Biały Bór, Subcarpathian Voivodeship (south-east Poland)
- Biały Bór in West Pomeranian Voivodeship (north-west Poland)
