= Wilhelm Mach =

Polish writer, literary critic (1916–1965)

Wilhelm Mach OOP, KK
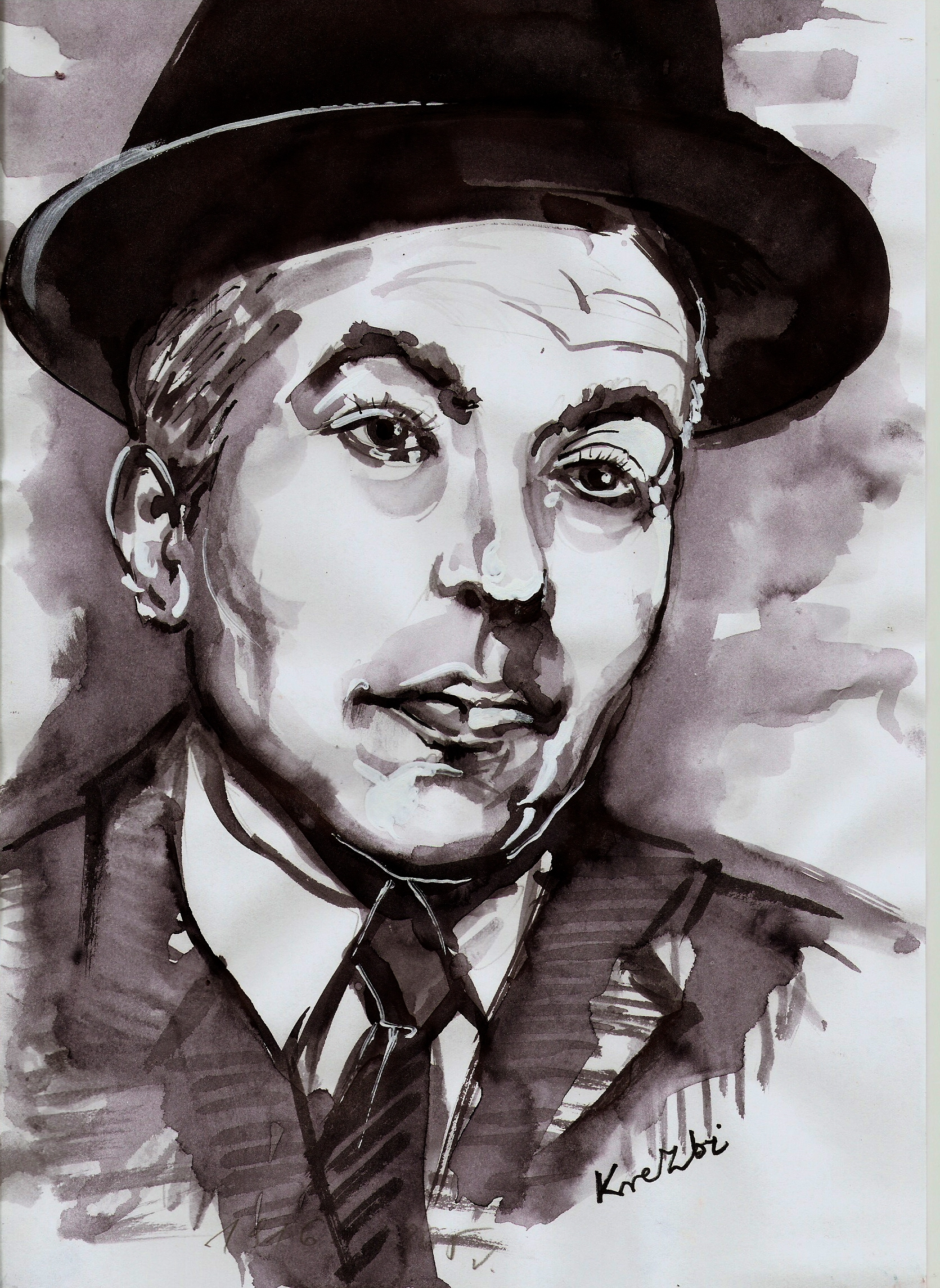
- Born: 26 December 1916; Kamionka, Ropczyce-Sędziszów County, Poland
- Died: 2 July 1965 (aged 48); Warsaw
- Education: Jagiellonian University
- Writing career
- Pen name: il., Quidam, s., S., Współpracownik
- Language: Polish
- Genres: Essays, literary critique, poetry
- Notable works: Agnieszka, córka Kolumba

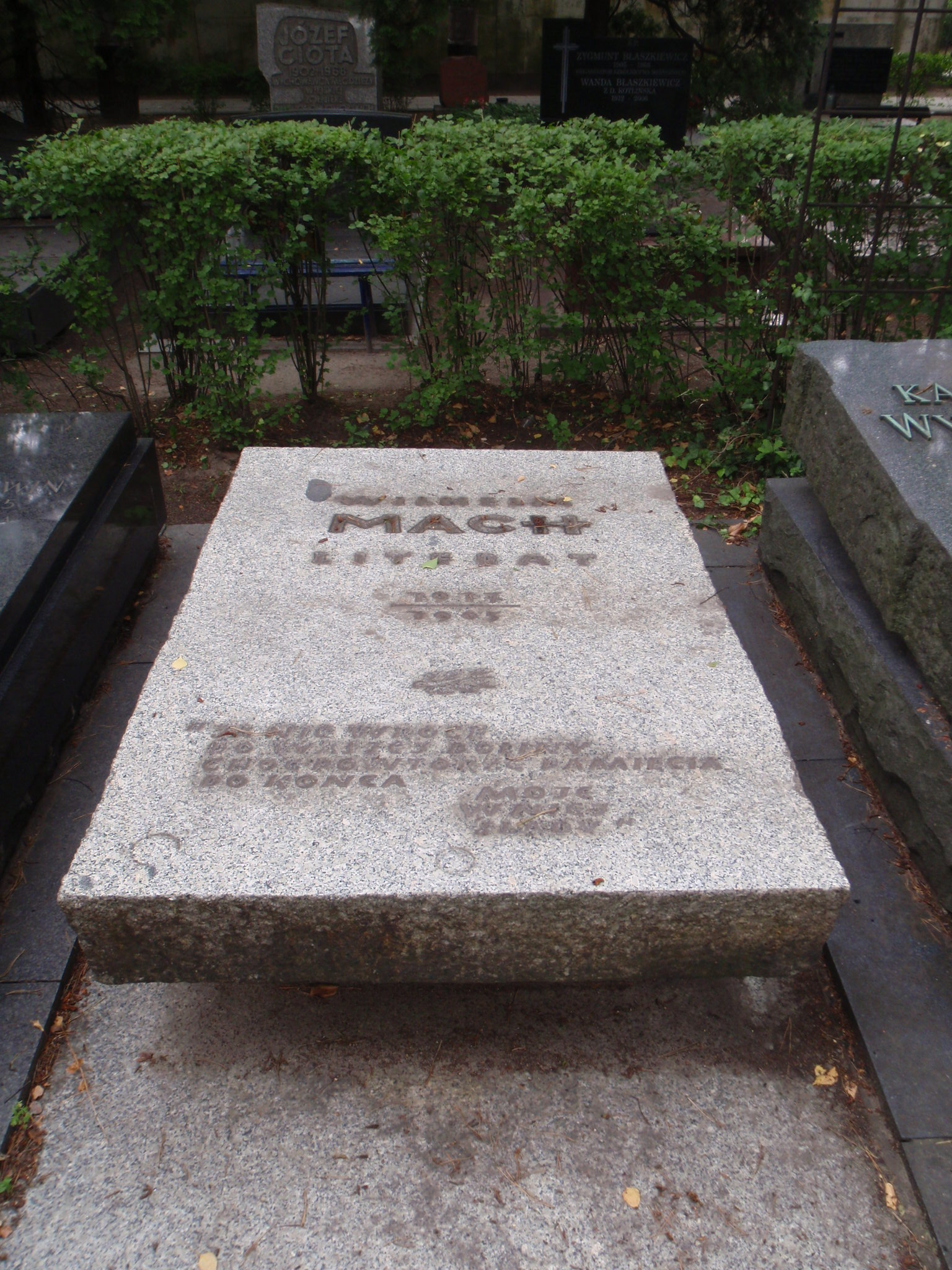
Grave of Wilhelm Mach, Powązki Military Cemetery, Warsaw

Wilhelm Mach, pen names il., Quidam, s., S., Współpracownik (26 December 1916, (Note: Many documents quote the date 1 January 1917, declared by the parents to prevent him from going to school and the army earlier.) Kamionka – 2 June 1965 in Warsaw) was a Polish writer, essayist, poet and literary critic.

== Life ==
He was born in Kamionka near Ropczyce in a peasant family to Wincenty Mach and Apolonia née Białek. He attended a school in Kamionka, and then continued education in Ropczyce, from 1928 in a private school – Miejskie Staroklasyczne Koedukacyjne Gimnazjum in Ropczyce. He debuted with a poem Jesień (Autumn) printed in a school press Przyszłość (Future, issue from 1 September 1928) and a novella Dawne zapusty published in a timely Rola. He continued his education from 1932 at the Władysław Jagiełło Gimnazjum in Dębica, where he edited the school magazine U nas. He graduated from secondary school diploma in 1936. In 1938 he graduated from the State Pedagogium in Krakow. After completing a one-year military service in September 1939, he graduated from the Infantry Cadet School. He fought during the invasion of Poland in the 6th Infantry Division of the Kraków Army. He took part in the battles of Pszczyna and Tomaszów Lubelski. During the occupation, he lived with his sister Bronisława in the Księżomost part of Sędziszów Małopolski, and then from 1941 in Kraków, where he worked at the Social Insurance Institution (Ubezpieczalnia Społeczna). In Krakow, he was active in the underground, teaching high school students in underground classes. In 1945, he began studies at the Faculty of Humanities (Polish studies) of the Jagiellonian University, which he graduated on 1 December 1947.

Wilhelm Mach himself considered his literary debut the publication of the poem Tobie dalekiej (To distant you), printed in autumn 1945 in a one-day journal Inaczej (Differently), co-redacted by him. He debuted as a prose writer with the story Rdza (Rust) in 1945 in the pages of the 42nd issue of the weekly Odrodzenie (Rebirth). In the years 1945–1946 he belonged to the literary group "Inaczej" (Differently). In the years 1945–1950 he was the secretary of the editorial office of the monthly "Twórczość" in Krakow, where he published short stories and literary reviews. He continued to publish in Odrodzenie (1945–1947) and Dziennik Literacki (1947–1950). From 1945 he was a member of the Youth Circle at the Krakow branch of the Polish Writers' Union. He became a member of the Union in 1948. In the years 1947–1948 he was on a scholarship from the French government in Paris. In 1950 he moved to Warsaw together with the editorial office of Twórczość. He was a literary consultant for the Polish Army House. In 1950–1958 he was the editor of the weekly Nowa Kultura (New culture), where he became known as a patron of aspiring and beginning writers, reviewing their works and advertising them to the publishers. From 1956 he traveled to the USSR and India, and from 1958 to Bulgaria several times, and in 1961 to the United States.

He was friends with Zofia Nałkowska, who appointed him one of the four curators of her legacy.

He died suddenly on 2 July 1965. According to his biographer Janusz Termer and family, the cause was a heart attack. Literary friends of Mach, such as Marek Nowakowskiand Kazimierz Brandys, however, recalled that the writer committed suicide by poisoning himself and that he talked about such plans even earlier. He was buried on Powązki Military Cemetery in Warsaw (Quarter C 2 row, 6 m. 8).

=== Private life ===
The Polish literary circles were widely aware of Mach's homosexuality, but did not speak of it for over 20 years after his death. Nowakowski would later describe how Mach shared the fate of many Polish gay men of the period, having to hide in the closet and live a double life, looking for relationships in shady surroundings such as train stations. In 1976, after a publication of Kalendarz i klepsydra by Tadeusz Konwicki, Mach's sister threatened to sue the author, who called his friend Mach an "auntie" in the book, for defamation. She didn't file the charges, but the mention of Mach disappeared from the later editions.

== Works ==
=== Novels ===
- Rdza (Rust), Czytelnik 1950, Czytelnik 1967
- Jaworowy dom (Ashen house), Twórczość 1954, Czytelnik 1954, Czytelnik 1955, Czytelnik 1977
- Życie duże i małe (Life big and small), Wydawnictwo Łódzkie 1959, Czytelnik 1965, Czytelnik 1972, Czytelnik 1974, Wydawnictwo Łódzkie 1984
- Góry nad czarnym morzem (Mountains over the black sea), Czytelnik 1961, przekład czeski 1967
- Agnieszka, córka Kolumba (Agnieszka, daughter of Columbus), Czytelnik 1964, Czytelnik 1965, Czytelnik 1968, Bulgarian translation 1966, Lithuanian translation 1966, Latvian translation 1972, Moldovan translation 1971, German translation 1970 and 1977, Russian translation 1969 and 1973, Ukrainian translation 1971 and 1982, Hungarian translation 1966, radio adaptation 1975

=== Short stories ===
- Za kwadrans wiosna (Quarter to spring), Wydawnictwo Literackie 1978

=== Movie scripts ===
- Do widzenia, do jutra, co-authored with Zbigniew Cybulski and Bogumił Kobiela, 1960
- Agnieszka 46, co-authored with Zdzisław Skowroński, 1964

=== Others ===
- Doświadczenia i przypadki. Opowiadania, eseje, reportaże i felietony. 1945–1953, Czytelnik 1954
- Szkice literackie, Czytelnik 1971

== Awards and decorations ==
- 1954 – Knight's Cross of Order of Polonia Restituta
- 1955 – National prize, 3rd rank, for Jaworowy dom
- 1959 – First prize of Łódź Voivodeship for Życie duże i małe
- 1964 – National prize, 2nd rank, for Agnieszka, córka Kolumba

== Memorials ==
- In 1968–1981 Polish Writers' Union awarded Wilhelm Mach Prize for novel debuts.
- In 1966 a new primary school in his homeplace of Kamionka was named after Wilhelm Mach, and in the building of Liceum Ogólnokształcące in Dębica a plaque commemorating Wilhelm Mach was established.
- In Gorlice, Villa Szklarczykówka was called the House of Remembrance of Wilhelm Mach. During the occupation, this house was the seat of the Gorlice Gestapo.

== Bibliography ==
- Fiut, Aleksander (1977). Dowód nietożsamości. Proza Wilhelma Macha. Ossolineum.
