= Podole, Podkarpackie Voivodeship =

Podole
- Village
- Location within Poland
- Coordinates: 50°10′43″N 21°28′15″E
- Country: Poland
- Voivodeship: Subcarpathian
- County: Mielec
- Gmina: Przecław
- Population: 1,100

Podole [pɔˈdɔlɛ] is a village in the administrative district of Gmina Przecław, within Mielec County, Subcarpathian Voivodeship, in south-eastern Poland.
