= Dąbie, Podkarpackie Voivodeship =

Dąbie
- Village
- Location within Poland
- Coordinates: 50°08′51″N 21°17′40″E
- Country: Poland
- Voivodeship: Podkarpackie
- County: Mielec
- Gmina: Radomyśl Wielki
- Population: 980

Dąbie [ˈdɔmbjɛ] is a village in the administrative district of Gmina Radomyśl Wielki, within Mielec County, Podkarpackie Voivodeship, in south-eastern Poland. The village lies on the junction of the Tuszymka and Wisłoka rivers.
