= Gmina Ostrów =

Gmina Ostrów Ostrów Commune
- Gmina
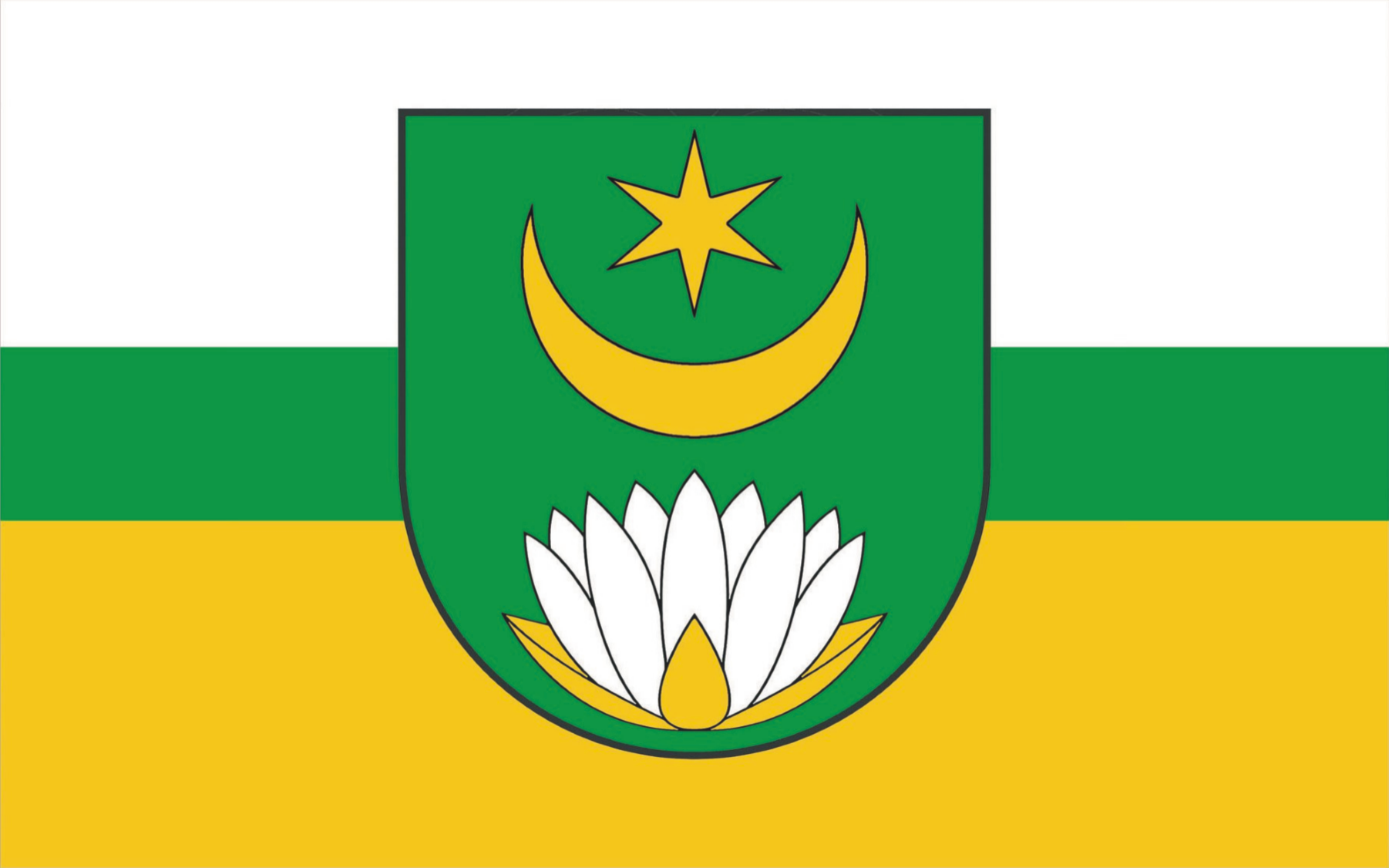
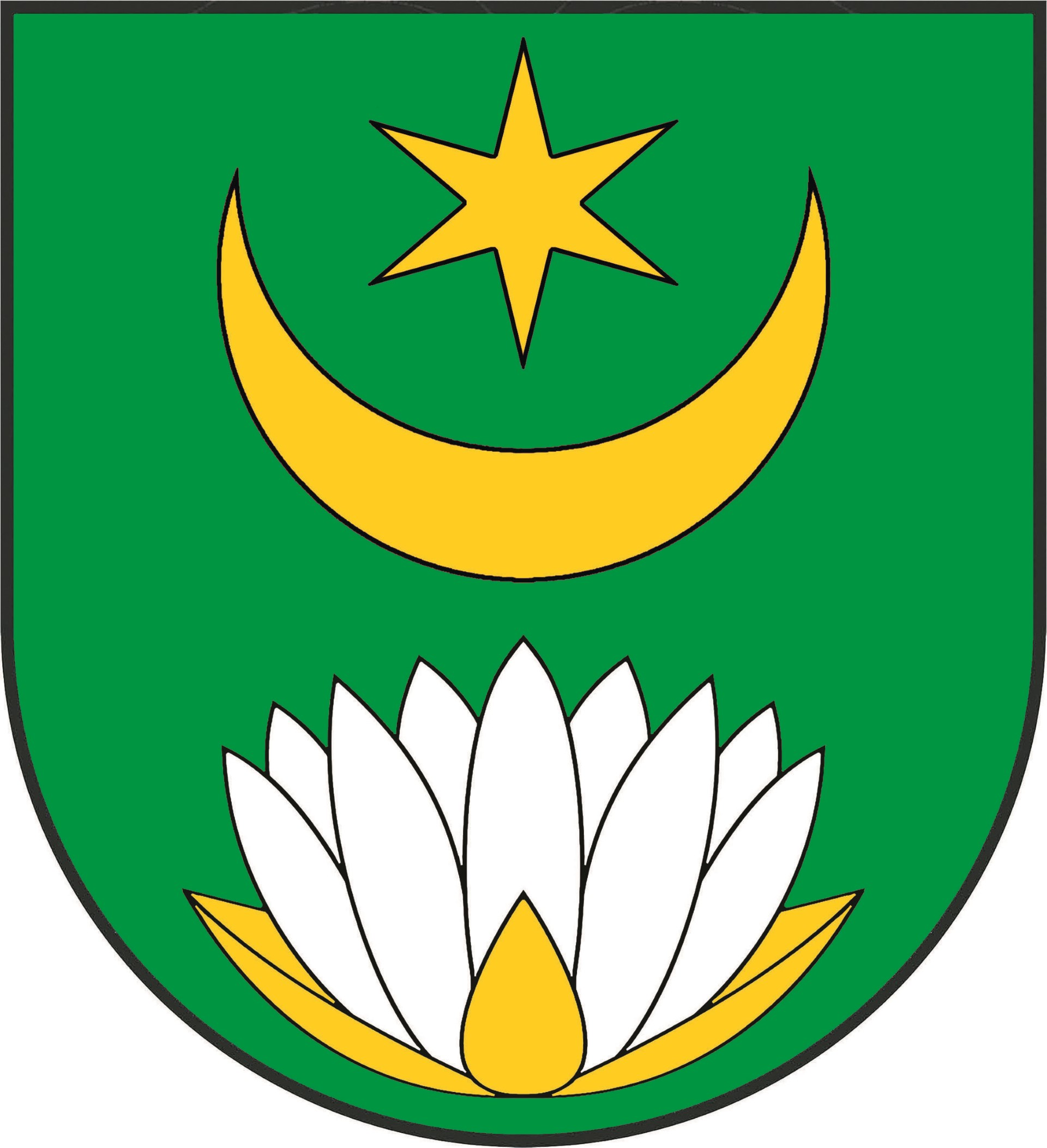
- Flag Coat of arms
- Interactive map of Gmina Ostrów
- Coordinates (Ostrów): 50°5′N 21°36′E
- Country: Poland
- Voivodeship: Subcarpathian
- County: Ropczyce-Sędziszów
- Seat: Ostrów

Area
  - Total: 96.24 km^{2} (37.16 sq mi)

Population (2006)
  - Total: 6,808
  - Density: 70.74/km^{2} (183.2/sq mi)
- Website: http://www.ostrow.gmina.pl

Gmina Ostrów is a rural gmina (administrative district) in Ropczyce-Sędziszów County, Subcarpathian Voivodeship, in south-eastern Poland. Its seat is the village of Ostrów, which lies approximately 3 kilometres (2 mi) west of Ropczyce and 30 km (19 mi) west of the regional capital Rzeszów.

The gmina covers an area of 96.62 square kilometres (37.3 sq mi), and as of 2006 its total population is 6,808.

== Villages ==
Gmina Ostrów contains the villages and settlements of Blizna, Borek Mały, Kamionka, Kozodrza, Ocieka, Ostrów, Sadykierz, Skrzyszów, Wola Ociecka and Zdżary.

== Neighbouring gminas ==
Gmina Ostrów is bordered by the gminas of Dębica, Niwiska, Przecław, Ropczyce and Sędziszów Małopolski.
