= Skrzyszów, Podkarpackie Voivodeship =

Skrzyszów
- Village
- Location within Poland
- Coordinates: 50°4′N 21°33′E
- Country: Poland
- Voivodeship: Subcarpathian
- County: Ropczyce-Sędziszów
- Gmina: Ostrów
- Population: 1,000

Skrzyszów [ˈskʂɨʂuf] is a village in the administrative district of Gmina Ostrów, within Ropczyce-Sędziszów County, Subcarpathian Voivodeship, in south-eastern Poland.
