= Kozodrza =

- Village
- Location within Poland
- Coordinates: 50°6′N 21°36′E
- Country: Poland
- Voivodeship: Subcarpathian
- County: Ropczyce-Sędziszów
- Gmina: [[Gmi na Ostrów|Ostrów]]
- Population: 804

Kozodrza [kɔˈzɔdʐa] is a village in the administrative district of Gmina Ostrów, within Ropczyce-Sędziszów County, Subcarpathian Voivodeship, in south-eastern Poland.
