= Przecław =

- Town
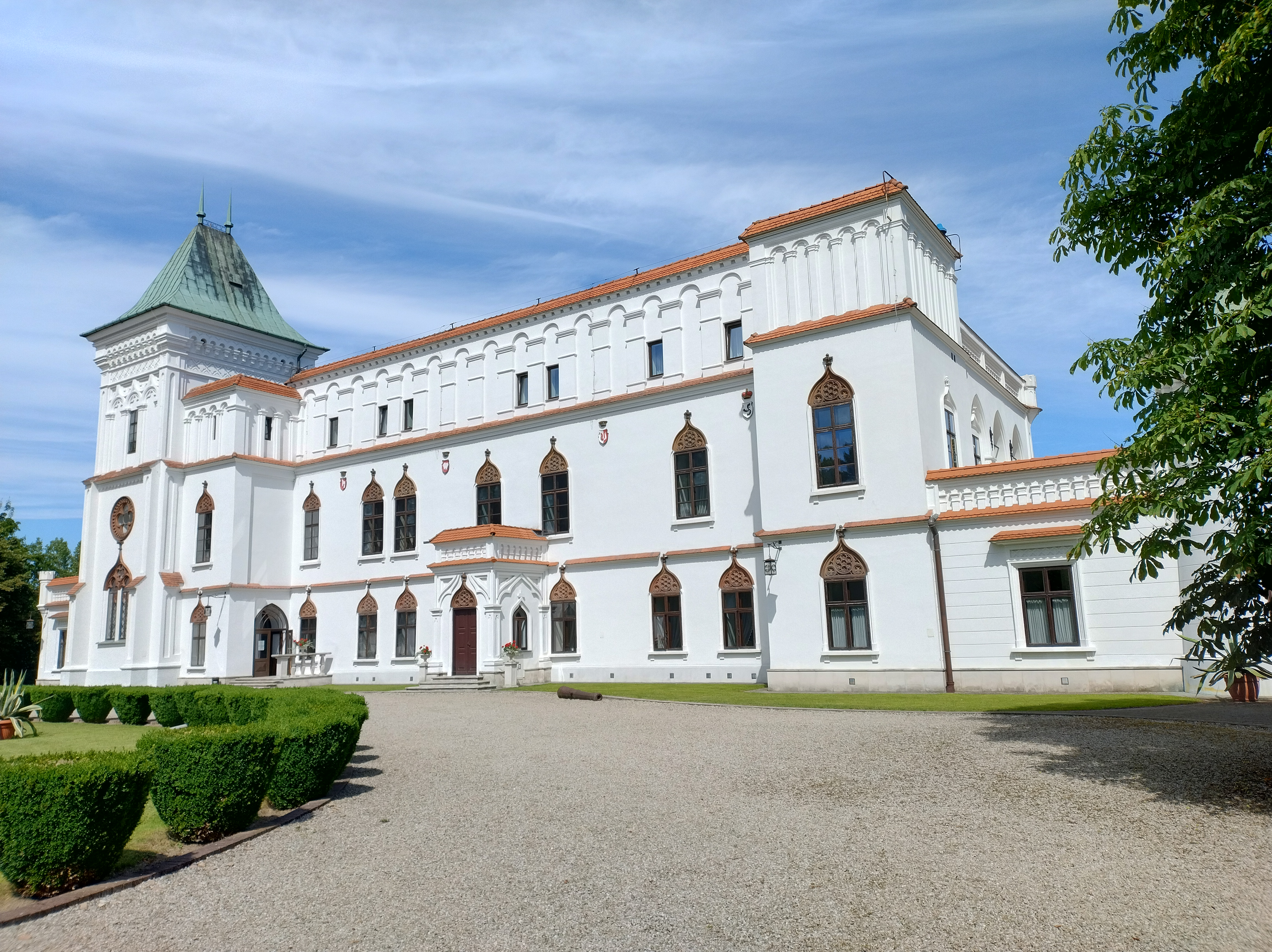
- Przecław Castle

- Coat of arms

- Location within Poland
- Coordinates: 50°11′35″N 21°28′42″E
- Country: Poland
- Voivodeship: Subcarpathian
- County: Mielec
- Gmina: Przecław

Population
  - Total: 1,775
- Time zone: UTC+1 (CET)
  - Summer (DST): UTC+2 (CEST)
- Postal code: 39-320
- Vehicle registration: RMI

Przecław [ˈpʂɛt͡swaf] is a small town in Mielec County, Subcarpathian Voivodeship, in south-eastern Poland. It is the seat of the gmina (administrative district) called Gmina Przecław. Its population is 1,775.

== History ==
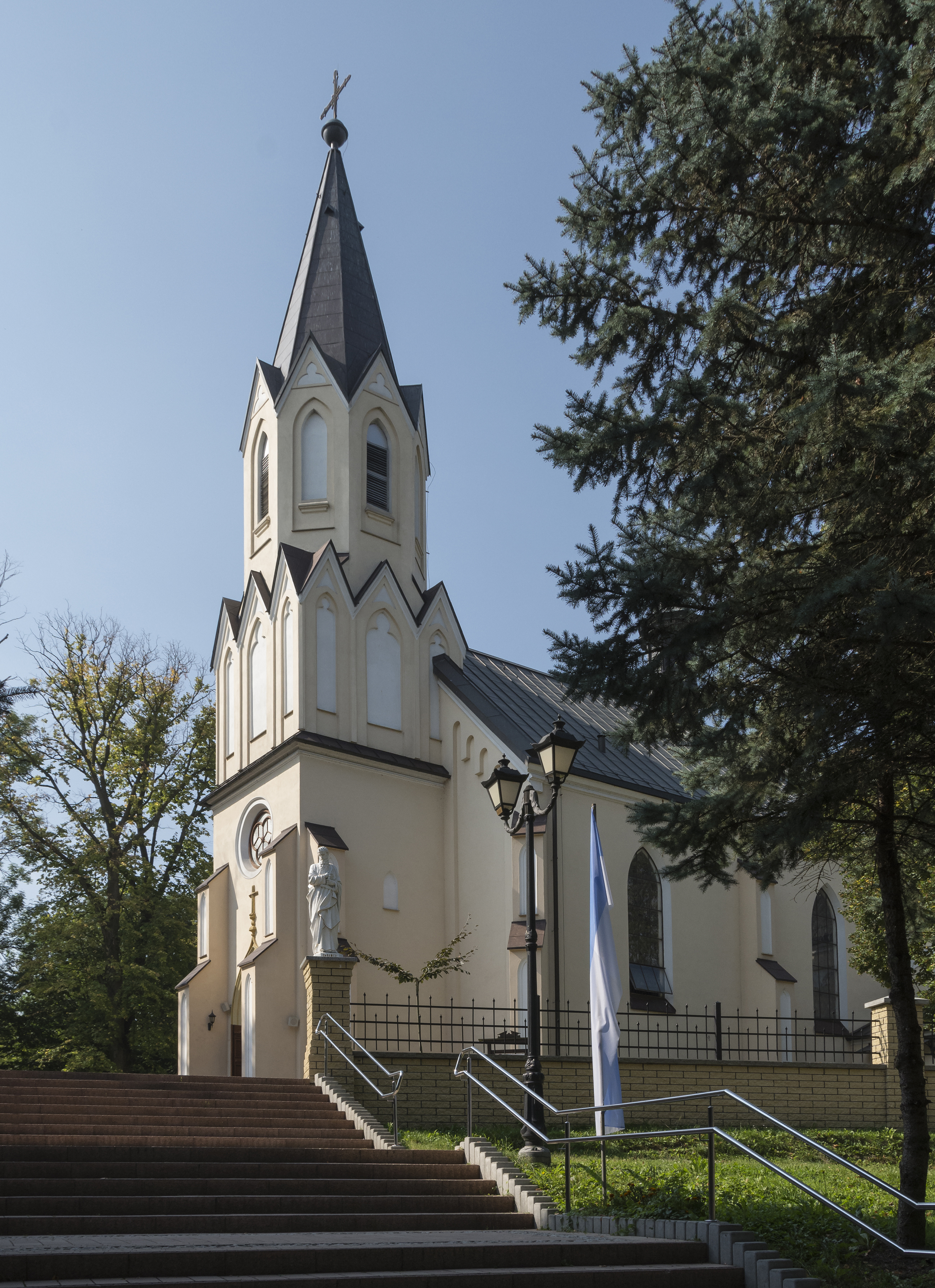
Church of the Assumption

First known mention of the town of Przecław comes from the year 1419, as earlier documents have not been preserved. Located on the edges of Sandomierz Forest, it was then spelled as Przedzlaw. It is not known when Przecław received its Magdeburg rights town charter, probably sometime in the 14th century, during the reign of King Casimir III the Great. The history of a slavic settlement here dates back much earlier. Due to a convenient defensive location, on a hill dominating the valley of the Wisłoka, Przecław was a gord, with a church already there in the 12th century. In the Middle Ages, the Wisłoka river bed reached Przecław's eastern boundary, creating a natural protection for both the gord and the church. From the west, it was protected by dense, swampy forests, with numerous rivers, streams and ponds.

In the late 14th century, the town belonged to Jan Ligęza, and by the mid-15th century, Przecław had a parish school, a mill, a castle, a town hall and a mayor with a council. In 1461 the town had a wójt, belonging to the noble Ligęza family. Przecław was a small town, with only 40 houses as of 1536. It burned in 1548, and by 1555 a new town hall was built. In 1582, King Stephen Bathory allowed the owners of the town to organize two additional fairs a year. Przecław was famous for its blacksmiths, butchers and clothmakers. In the early 17th century, the town had a population of 800, with a number of streets and a stone bridge connecting Przecław with the castle. In 1622, the population was decimated by an epidemic, and on November 25, 1624, half of the buildings burned in a fire (54 houses burned, 47 were saved). The epidemic returned in 1652, and during the Swedish invasion of Poland, Przecław was completely destroyed in 1656. By 1660, its population shrank to 116. The town never recovered from the destruction. The parish school, originally founded in 1454 by Zbigniew Oleśnicki, closed in 1721. Przecław was a private town, administratively located in the Sandomierz Voivodeship in the Lesser Poland Province.

From the First Partition of Poland in 1772 to the end of World War I in 1918, the town was part of the Austrian province of Galicia. In 1919, the government of the Second Polish Republic reduced Przecław to the status of a village. In the interwar period, it belonged to Kraków Voivodeship.

Following the German-Soviet invasion of Poland, which started World War II in September 1939, Przecław was occupied by Germany.

Przecław regained its town charter on January 1, 2010.

== Przecław Castle ==
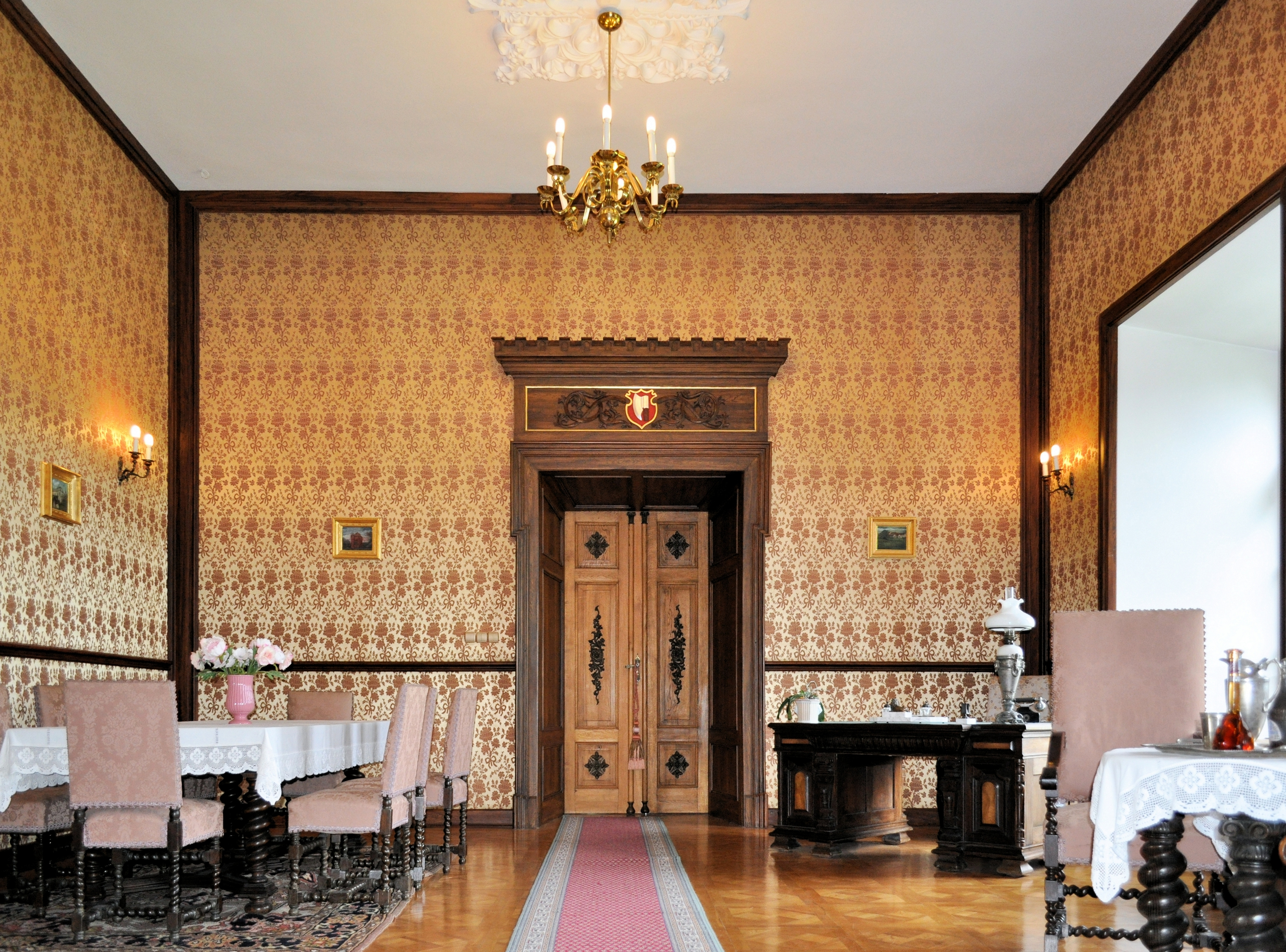
Castle interior

It is not known when the renaissance castle was built. Originally it was made of wood, and by 1578 it belonged to the Ligeza family. In the late 16th century it was purchased by the Koniecpolski family, which built a new, stone structure. In 1658, the castle was bought by Governor Wladyslaw Rey. The castle remained in the hands of the aristocratic Rey family until its confiscation by the communist regime in 1944. The Rey family had been active during the war in the anti-German underground movement Armia Krajowa and its organisation Tarcza Opieka providing shelter to fugitives, including Jews, and material support to the Polish Resistance. Armia Krajowa members and landowners were persecuted after the war by the communist regime, and the Rey family had to go into exile to France. The castle has not been returned to its former owners and is currently a restaurant and hotel open to visitors.

== See also ==
- Castles in Poland
