= Sadykierz, Ropczyce-Sędziszów County =

Sadykierz
- Village
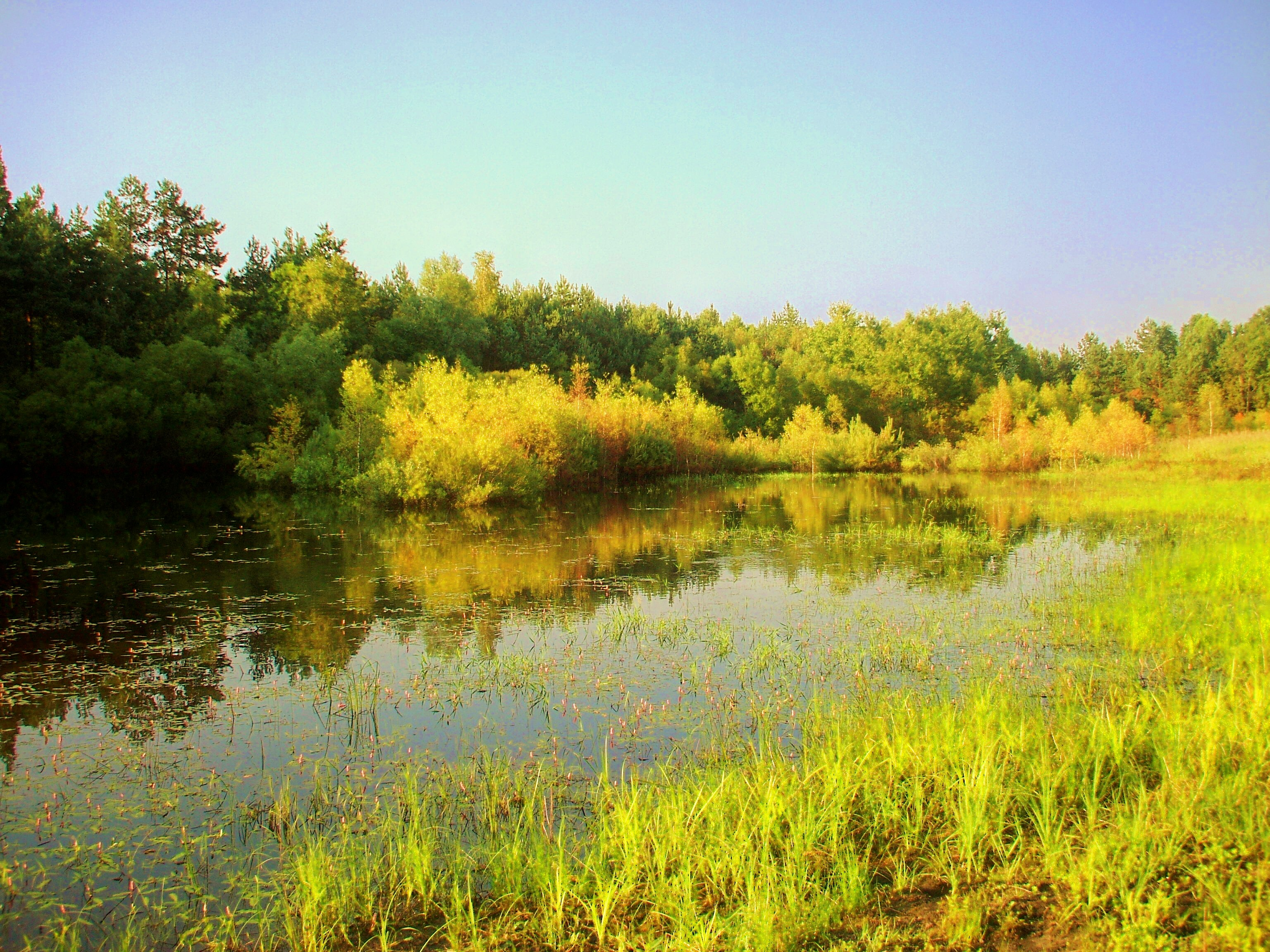
- Post-glacial lake in Sadykierz

- Location within Poland
- Coordinates: 50°10′N 21°38′E
- Country: Poland
- Voivodeship: Subcarpathian
- County: Ropczyce-Sędziszów
- Gmina: Ostrów

Sadykierz [saˈdɨkʲɛʂ] is a village in the administrative district of Gmina Ostrów, within Ropczyce-Sędziszów County, Subcarpathian Voivodeship, in south-eastern Poland. The village dates back to the beginning of the 13th century.

== History ==
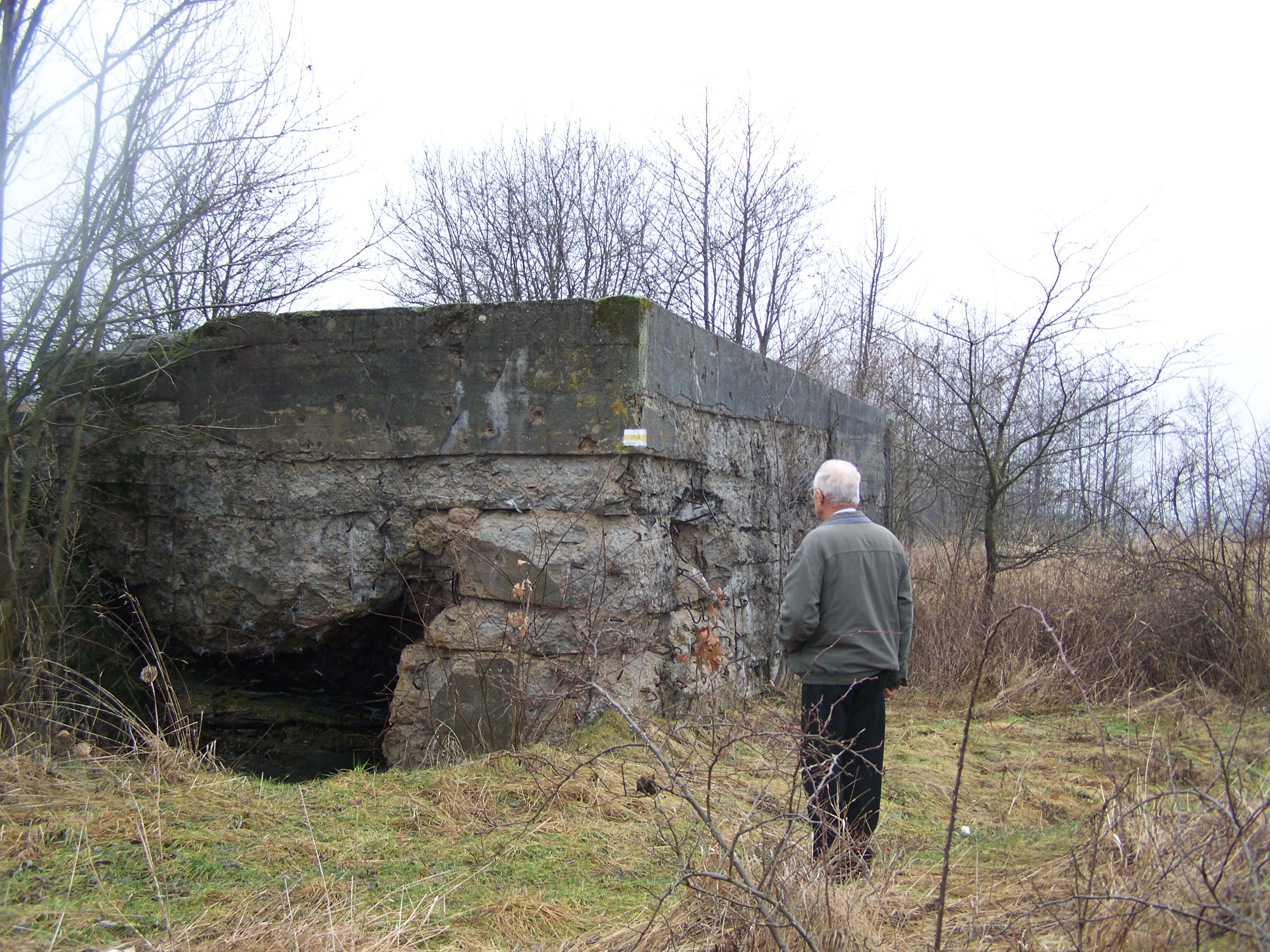
German World War II bunker near Sadykierz

In the region near Ocieka there occurred a battle against the Tatars. The Polish knights achieved a resounding victory. To commemorate this, an area close by became known as 'Góra Tatarska' (Tatar Hill). In 1531 the Grand Crown Hetman, Jan Amor Tarnowski led a Polish army against the Moldavian Prince ('Hospodar') Petru Rareş in the Battle of Obertyn. Despite being outnumbered four to one, the battle ended with a Polish victory, a complete Tatar surrender and the reconquest of Pokuttya or 'Pokuttia' (Ukrainian: Покуття, Romanian: Pocuţia, Polish: Pokucie). Tarnowski brought his Tatar prisoners-of-war back to Ocieka. These prisoners became the first occupants of a new settlement near Ocieka, called 'Sadykierz'. The name 'Sadykierz' has distinct Tatar origins, just as do today's inhabitants of the same village.

The settlement of Sadykierz is located by a post-glacial lake, home to a rare species of white water-lily.
