= Gmina Przecław =

Gmina Przecław Przecław Commune
- Gmina
- Coat of arms
- Interactive map of Gmina Przecław
- Coordinates (Przecław): 50°11′35″N 21°28′42″E
- Country: Poland
- Voivodeship: Subcarpathian
- County: Mielec
- Seat: Przecław

Area
  - Total: 134.29 km^{2} (51.85 sq mi)

Population (2006)
  - Total: 10,946
  - Density: 81.510/km^{2} (211.11/sq mi)

Gmina Przecław is an urban-rural gmina (administrative district) in Mielec County, Subcarpathian Voivodeship, in south-eastern Poland. Its seat is the town of Przecław, which lies approximately 11 kilometres (7 mi) south of Mielec and 42 km (26 mi) north-west of the regional capital Rzeszów.

The gmina covers an area of 134.29 square kilometres (51.8 sq mi), and as of 2006 its total population is 10,946. Before 1 January 2010, when Przecław became a town, the district was classed as a rural gmina.

== Villages ==
Apart from the town of Przecław, the gmina contains the villages and settlements of Biały Bór, Błonie, Dobrynin, Kiełków, Łączki Brzeskie, Podole, Rzemień, Tuszyma, Wylów and Zaborcze.

== Neighbouring gminas ==
Gmina Przecław is bordered by the town of Mielec and by the gminas of Dębica, Mielec, Niwiska, Ostrów, Radomyśl Wielki and Żyraków.
