= Tuszyma =

- Village
- Location within Poland
- Coordinates: 50°12′N 21°31′E
- Country: Poland
- Voivodeship: Subcarpathian
- County: Mielec
- Gmina: Przecław
- Population: 2,405

Tuszyma [tuˈʂɨma] is a village in the administrative district of Gmina Przecław, within Mielec County, Subcarpathian Voivodeship, in south-eastern Poland.
