= Ruda, Ropczyce-Sędziszów County =

Ruda
- Village
- Location within Poland
- Coordinates: 50°8′12″N 21°41′34″E
- Country: Poland
- Voivodeship: Subcarpathian
- County: Ropczyce-Sędziszów
- Gmina: Sędziszów Małopolski

Population
  - Total: 300
- Time zone: UTC+1 (CET)
  - Summer (DST): UTC+2 (CEST)
- Vehicle registration: RRS

Ruda [ˈruda] is a village in the administrative district of Gmina Sędziszów Małopolski, within Ropczyce-Sędziszów County, Subcarpathian Voivodeship, in south-eastern Poland. Ruda lies on the Tuszymka river, a tributary of the Wisłoka river.

In the past this area was known for iron smelting and iron goods. In fact, the name of the village ‘Ruda’ (Polish: ‘ruda’ ≈ red) comes from the red iron ore which was mined in this area.

== Notable people ==
- Stanisław Kot (1885–1975), Polish historian and politician, was born in Ruda.
