= Wylów =

- Village
- Location within Poland
- Coordinates: 50°13′N 21°24′E
- Country: Poland
- Voivodeship: Subcarpathian
- County: Mielec
- Gmina: Przecław

Wylów [ˈvɨluf] is a village in the administrative district of Gmina Przecław, within Mielec County, Subcarpathian Voivodeship, in south-eastern Poland.
