= Polish Writers Association =

- Founded: 1989
- Type: Cultural Institution
- Headquarters: Warsaw, Poland
- Key people: Sergiusz Sterna-Wachowiak
- Website: zgspp.pl

The Polish Writers Association (Polish: Stowarzyszenie Pisarzy Polskich) is an organization of Polish writers, poets, playwrights, critics and translators. SPP, established in 1989 is a continuation of the Professional Union of Polish Writers, founded in 1920 on the initiative of Stefan Żeromski which was deactivated during World War II.

The foundation of the association was possible due to the historical and political transformations, which took place in 1989 in Poland. The majority of the most prominent and influential writers and former members of the Polish Writers' Union officially joined the organization, which was formed in 1984, and because of the decision of the communist authorities, remained illegal up until 1989. Czesław Miłosz became the first formal member of the new institution.

The headquarters of Stowarzyszenie Pisarzy Polskich is located in the House of Literature at Krakowskie Przedmieście 87/89 in Warsaw. At present, the association has got 11 major branches located in the following cities: Warsaw, Lublin, Katowice, Kraków, Wrocław, Szczecin, Gdańsk, Bydgoszcz, Łódź, Olsztyn and Poznań.

== Notable members ==
Notable past members of the Polish Writers Association include science fiction author Stanisław Lem.

A number of the association's members, including Aleksander Fiut and Krzysztof Siwczyk, resigned of cotntinuing membership in August 2020, which they stated in an open letter.

== See also ==
- Polish Writers' Union. Both organizations have their headquarters at the Dom Literatury (Literary House) in Warsaw.
