= Aleksander Fiut =

Polish literary historian, literary critic, and essayist (born 1945)

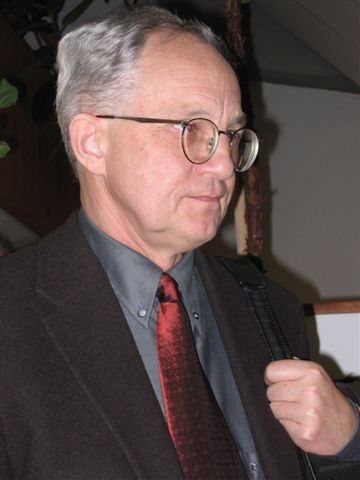
- Aleksander Fiut, 2005
- Born: 24 June 1945 (age 81); Żywiec, Poland
- Citizenship: Poland
- Occupations: Literary historian, literary critic, essayist

Aleksander Fiut (born 24 June 1945) is a Polish literary historian, literary critic and essayist who researched the works of Wilhelm Mach and Czesław Miłosz, among others.

== Biography ==
Son of the civil servant Władysław Fiut and Jadwiga née Jakubiec. Between 1959 and 1963, he attended the Nicolaus Copernicus Grammar School in Żywiec. Later he studied Polish philology at the Jagiellonian University (UJ) in Kraków and graduated with a master's degree in 1968. He started working at Kraków's public library (Miejska Biblioteka Publiczna). In 1974, he defended his doctoral thesis Twórczość prozatorska Wilhelma Macha (Wilhelm Mach's Prose Works), which was supervised by Tomasz Weiss. In 1987 he obtained a habilitation degree for his study Moment wieczny. O poezji Czesława Miłosza (translated into English as The Eternal Moment: The Poetry of Czesław Miłosz).

In 1996, he was made a state appointed professor and associate professor at the Jagiellonian University. Between 1997 and 2015, he held the Chair of Twentieth-Century Polish Literature at the institute (from 2004 Faculty) of Polish Studies at UJ.

His research interests include contemporary Polish literature, Central European literature, with emphasis on the intersection of literature and sociology, anthropology and social psychology. He supervised three doctoral dissertations.

He was a member of the Polish Writers Association until August 2020. He was a founding member of the Czesław Miłosz Birthplace Foundation (Fundacja Miejsc Rodzinnych Czesława Miłosza), which was established in 1997 at the University of Kaunas in Lithuania.

He became a member of the Slavic Culture Commission and the Literary History Commission of the Polish Academy of Arts and Sciences. He was a member of the Program Council of the Miłosz Institute at Claremont McKenna College.

== Books ==
- Dowód nietożsamości. Proza Wilhelma Macha. Ossolineum. 1977.
- Rozmowy z Czesławem Miłoszem. Wydawnictwo Literackie. 1981. ISBN 83-08-00690-6.
- Milosz par Milosz. Entretien de Czeslaw Milosz avec Ewa Czarnecka et Aleksander Fiut. Paris: Fayard. 1986. ISBN 2-213-01674-7. Co-authored with Renata Gorczyńska vel Ewa Czarnecka.
- Conversations With Czeslaw Milosz. San Diego: Harcourt Brace Jovanovich. 1987. ISBN 0-15-122591-5. Co-authored with Renata Gorczyńska vel Ewa Czarnecka.
- Moment wieczny. Poezja Czesława Miłosza. Historia i teraźniejszość. Vol. 14. Paris: Libella. 1987. ISBN 2-903332-05-3. Second edition: Open, Warszawa 1993, ISBN 83-85254-16-1; Wydawnictwo Literackie, Kraków 1998, ISBN 83-08-02875-6. American edition: The Eternal Moment. The Poetry of Czeslaw Milosz. Berkeley: California University Press. 1990.
- Czesława Miłosza autoportret przekorny. Rozmowy. Wydawnictwo Literackie. 1988. ISBN 83-08-01196-9. Other editions: 1994, ISBN 83-08-02540-4; 2003 within Dzieła zebrane (Collected Works) of Czesław Miłosz, ISBN 83-08-03263-X. Translated, sometimes with interviews made by Renata Gorczyńska [ibid.], into Italian, English, French, Serbo-Chorvat and Lithuanian languages.
- Pytanie o tożsamość. Wydawnictwo Literackie. 1995. ISBN 83-7052-246-7.
- Być (albo nie być) Środkowoeuropejczykiem. Wydawnictwo Literackie. 1999. ISBN 83-08-03003-3.
- V Evropě, čili… Eseje nejen o polské literatuře. Petra Zavřelová, Václav Burian (translated by). Olomouc: Votobia. 2001. ISBN 80-7198-502-3.
- W stronę Miłosza. Wydawnictwo Literackie. 2003. ISBN 83-08-03504-3.
- Spotkania z Innym. Wydawnictwo Literackie. 2006. ISBN 83-08-03921-9.

=== Editions ===
- Czesławowi Miłoszowi-poeci: antologia. Baran i Suszczyński. 1996. ISBN 83-85845-59-3.
- Poznawanie Miłosza 2. Cz. 1, 1980–1998. Wydawnictwo Literackie. 2000. ISBN 83-08-02863-2.
- Poznawanie Miłosza 2. Cz. 2, 1980–1998. Wydawnictwo Literackie. 2001. ISBN 83-08-03124-2.

== Accolades ==
- Kraków Book of the Month Award for Być (albo nie być) środkowoeuropejczykiem (March 2000)
- Kazimierz Wyka Award for his work in literary criticism (2006)
