= Grabinianka =

Location
- Country: Poland

Physical characteristics
- Mouth
  - location: Wisłoka
  - coordinates: 50°03′48″N 21°23′41″E

Basin features
- Progression: Wisłoka→ Vistula→ Baltic Sea

Grabinianka (also known as the Czarna) is a river of Poland, a tributary of the Wisłoka near Dębica.
