= Kamionka, Ropczyce-Sędziszów County =

Kamionka
- Village
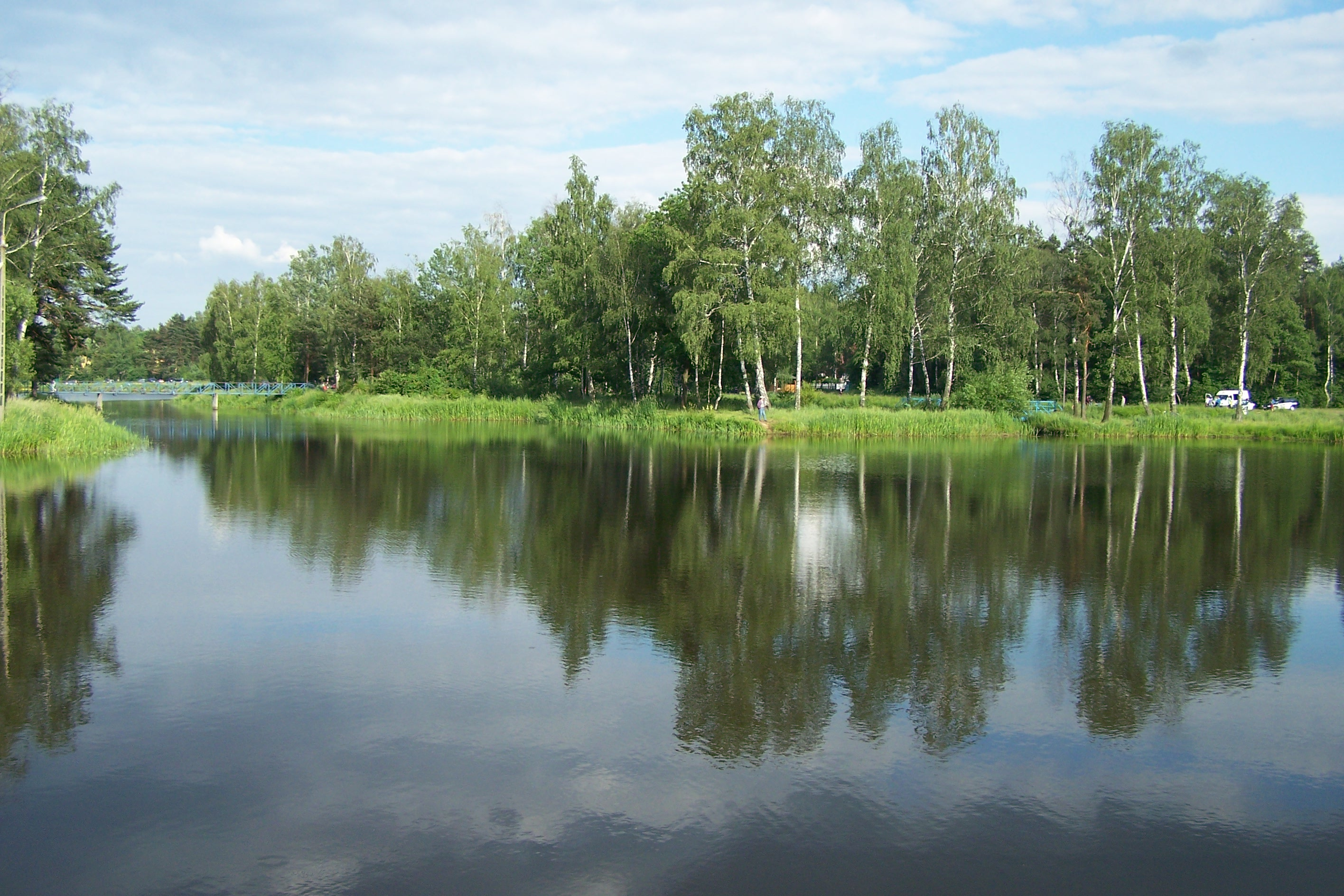
- Lake in Kamionka

- Location within Poland
- Coordinates: 50°8′N 21°40′E
- Country: Poland
- Voivodeship: Subcarpathian
- County: Ropczyce-Sędziszów
- Gmina: Ostrów

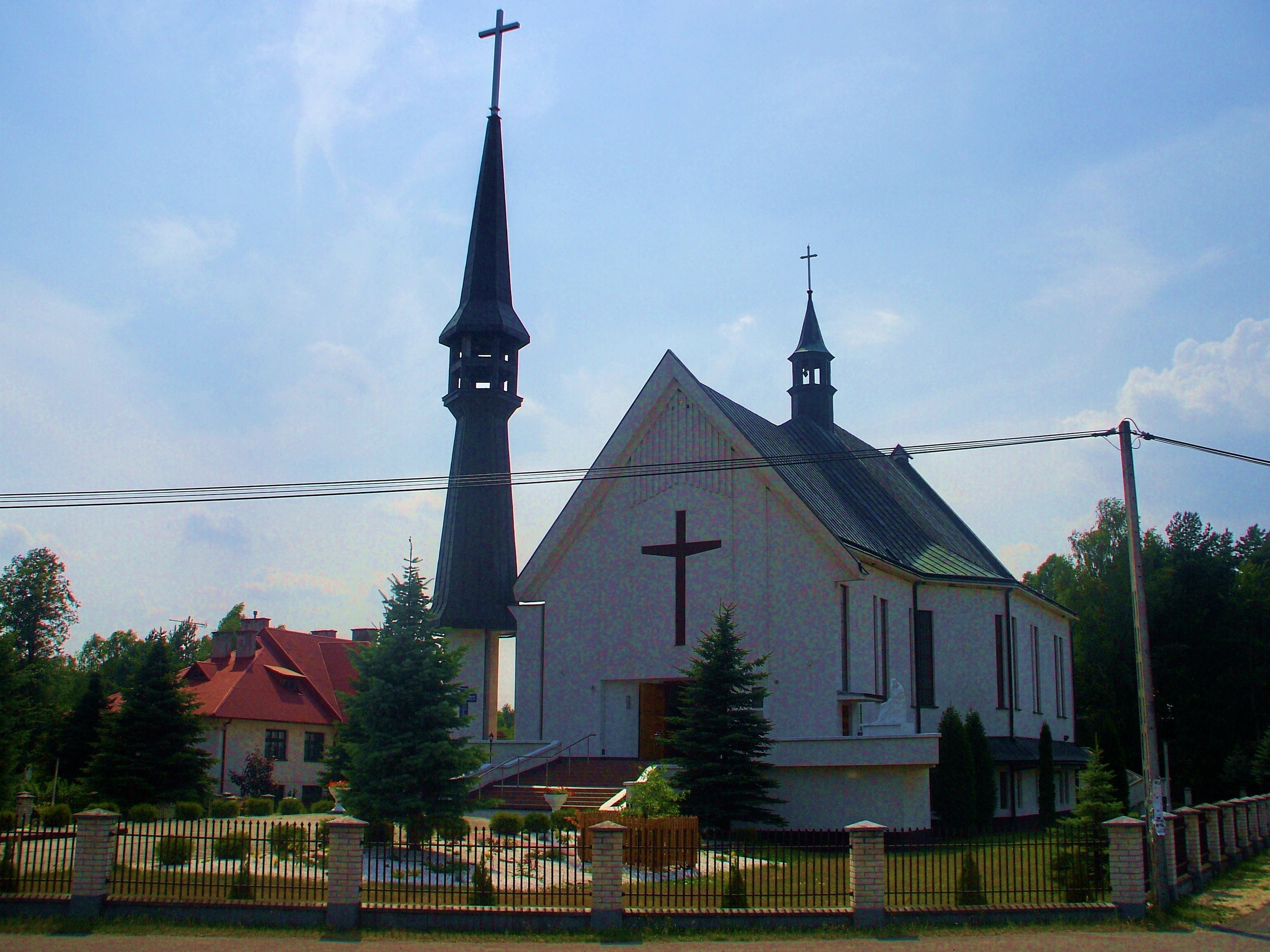
Church in Kamionka

Kamionka [kaˈmjɔnka] is a village in the administrative district of Gmina Ostrów, within Ropczyce-Sędziszów County, Subcarpathian Voivodeship, in south-eastern Poland. Kamionka lies on the Tuszymka river, a tributary of the Wisłoka river. In the past this area was known for iron smelting and a furnace was located in the village. Iron ore was brought in from the neighbouring village of Ruda, where it was mined. Today Kamionka is known for the picturesque lake which is located there, on the Wisłoka river, surrounded by pine forest. A popular area for camping and water sports.
