= Borek Mały =

- Village
- Location within Poland
- Coordinates: 50°6′N 21°38′E
- Country: Poland
- Voivodeship: Subcarpathian
- County: Ropczyce-Sędziszów
- Gmina: Ostrów

Borek Mały [ˈbɔrɛk ˈmawɨ] is a village in the administrative district of Gmina Ostrów, within Ropczyce-Sędziszów County, Subcarpathian Voivodeship, in south-eastern Poland.
