= Zdżary =

- Village
- Location within Poland
- Coordinates: 50°07′43″N 21°38′08″E
- Country: Poland
- Voivodeship: Subcarpathian
- County: Ropczyce-Sędziszów
- Gmina: Ostrów

Zdżary [ˈzd͡ʐarɨ] is a village in the administrative district of Gmina Ostrów, within Ropczyce-Sędziszów County, Subcarpathian Voivodeship, in south-eastern Poland.
