= Biały Bór, Podkarpackie Voivodeship =

Biały Bór
- Village
- Location within Poland
- Coordinates: 50°11′N 21°32′E
- Country: Poland
- Voivodeship: Subcarpathian
- County: Mielec
- Gmina: Przecław
- Population: 910

Biały Bór (Polish pronunciation: [ˈbjawɨ ˈbur]) is a village in the administrative district of Gmina Przecław, within Mielec County, Subcarpathian Voivodeship, in south-eastern Poland.
