= Ostrów, Ropczyce-Sędziszów County =

Ostrów
- Village
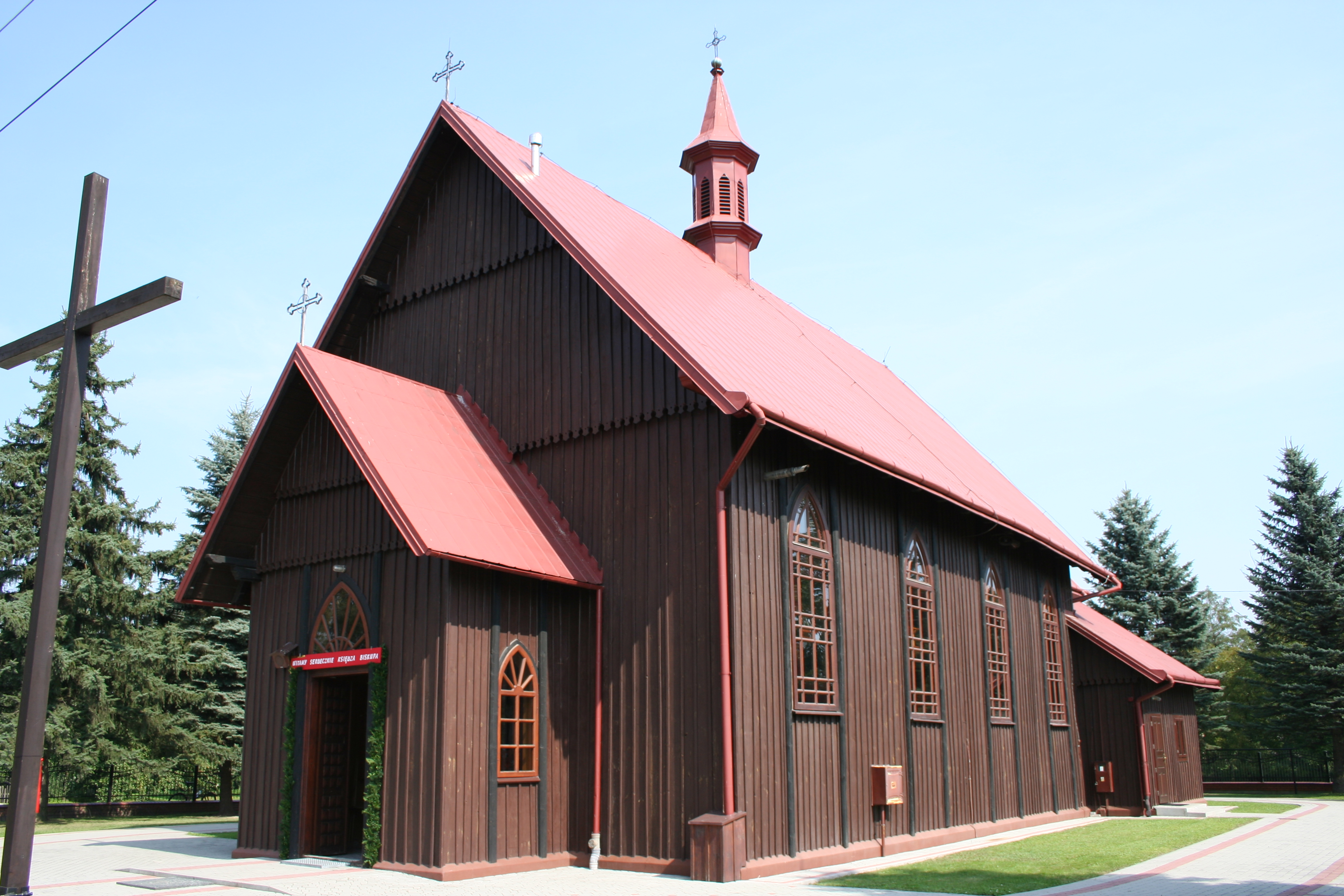
- Virgin Mary Queen of Poland church in Ostrów

- Location within Poland
- Coordinates: 50°5′N 21°36′E
- Country: Poland
- Voivodeship: Subcarpathian
- County: Ropczyce-Sędziszów
- Gmina: Ostrów

Population
  - Total: 1,500
- Time zone: UTC+1 (CET)
  - Summer (DST): UTC+2 (CEST)
- Vehicle registration: RRS

Ostrów [ˈɔstruf] is a village in Ropczyce-Sędziszów County, Subcarpathian Voivodeship, in south-eastern Poland. It is the seat of the gmina (administrative district) called Gmina Ostrów.

Four Polish citizens were murdered by Nazi Germany in the village during World War II.
