= Błonie, Podkarpackie Voivodeship =

Błonie
- Village
- Location within Poland
- Coordinates: 50°12′N 21°29′E
- Country: Poland
- Voivodeship: Subcarpathian
- County: Mielec
- Gmina: Przecław

Błonie [ˈbwɔɲɛ] is a village in the administrative district of Gmina Przecław, within Mielec County, Subcarpathian Voivodeship, in south-eastern Poland.
