= Wisłoka =

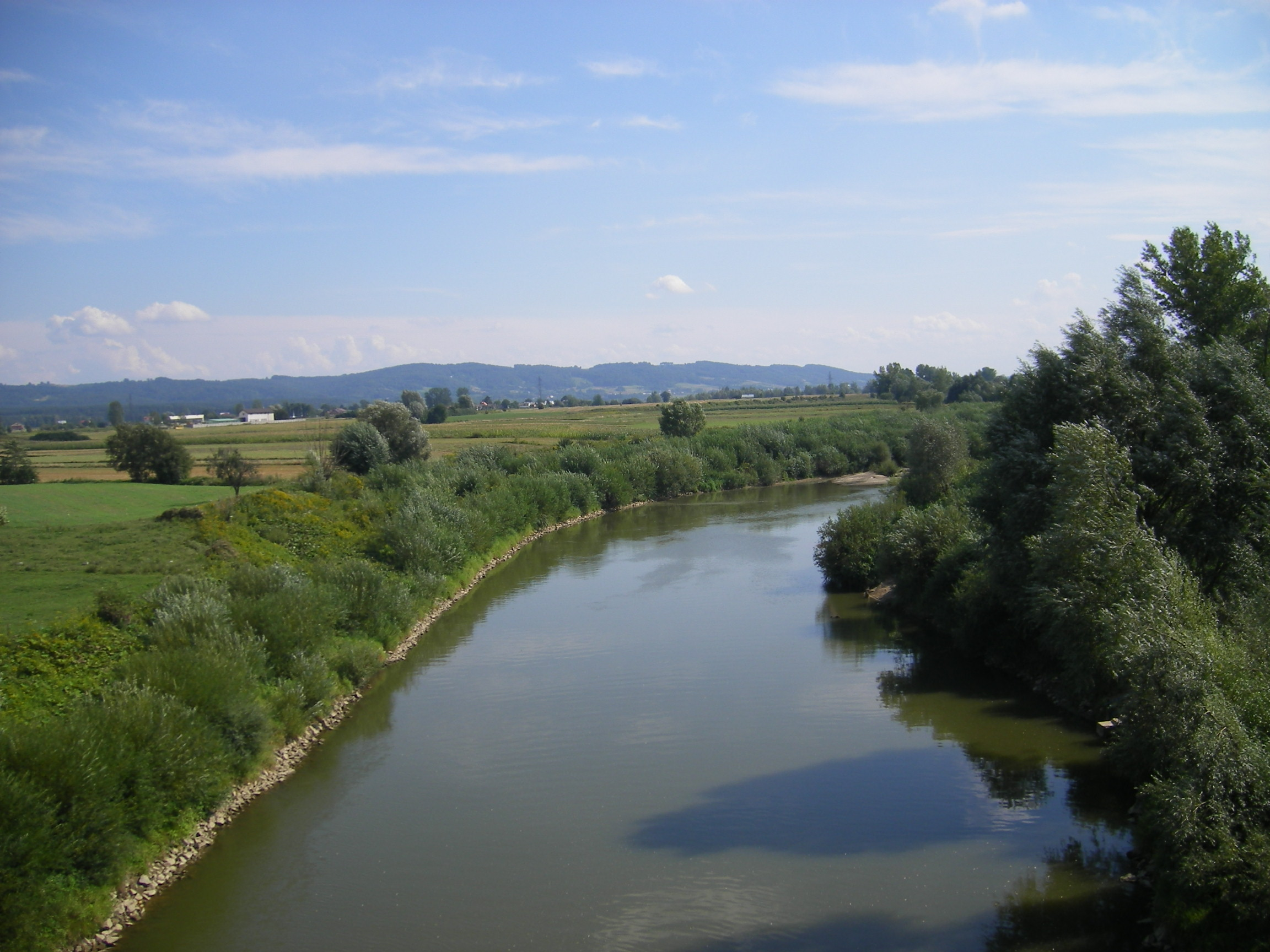
- Wisłoka in Pilzno

Location
- Country: Poland

Physical characteristics
- Mouth
  - location: Vistula
  - coordinates: 50°26′16″N 21°23′07″E
- Length: 173 km (107 mi)
- Basin size: 4,100 km^{2} (1,600 sq mi)
- Discharge
  - average: 35.5 m^{3}/s (1,250 cu ft/s)

Basin features
- Progression: Vistula→ Baltic Sea

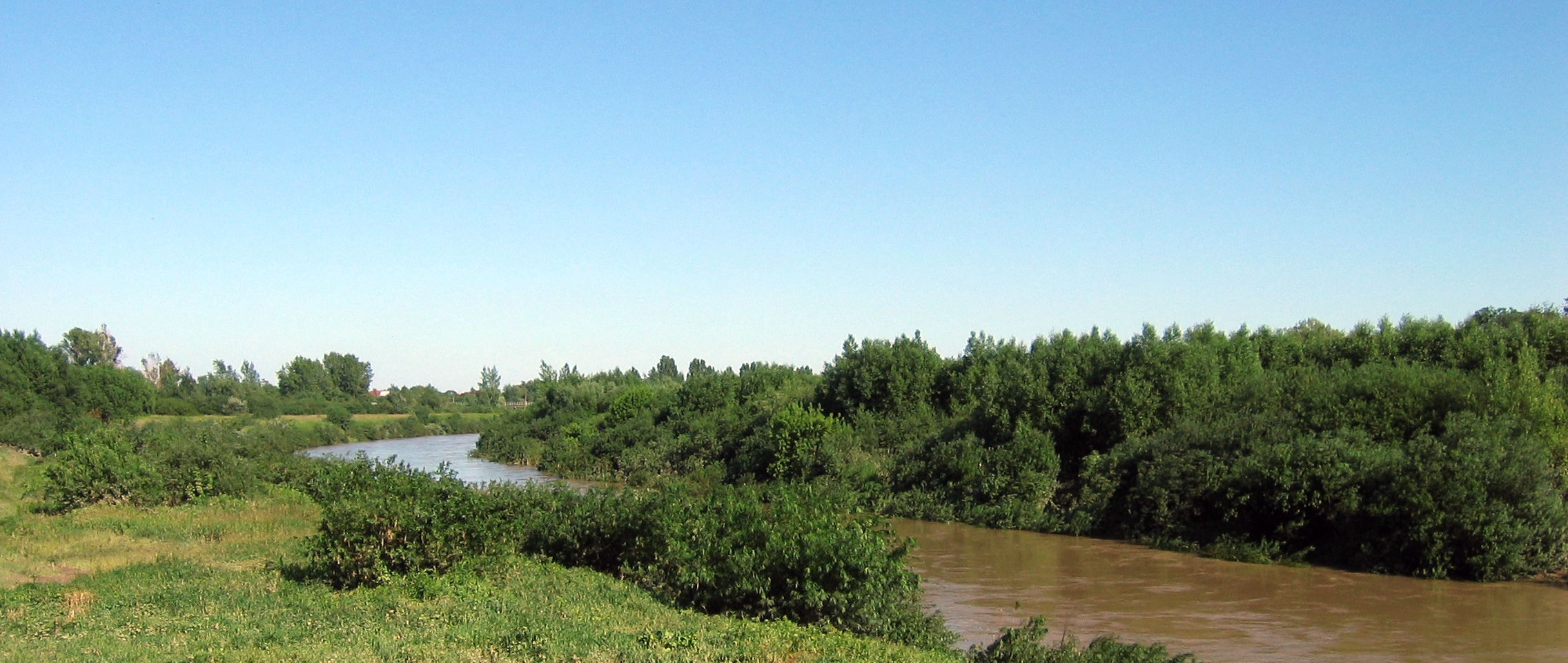
Wisłoka in Mielec

The Wisłoka [viˈswɔ.ka] is a river in south-eastern Poland, and a tributary of Vistula River. It is 173 kilometres (107 miles) long and has a basin area of 4,100 square kilometres (1,583 sq mi). Its highest elevation is 370 metres (1,213.91 ft), while the lowest point in the valley of the river Wisłoka lies at an elevation of 250 metres (820.21 ft) above sea level.

== Towns and townships around Wisłoka ==
Krempna; Nowy Żmigród; Osiek Jasielski; Dębowiec	Jasło; Kołaczyce; Brzyska; Brzostek	Pilzno; Dębica; Zyrakow; Przeclaw	Mielec; Borowa; Gawluszowice

== Tributaries ==
Tributaries of the Wisłoka include:

- Jasiołka
- Tuszymka
- Wielopolka
- Ropa
- Grabinianka

== See also ==
- 1934 flood in Poland

== See also ==
- Rivers of Poland
