= Anti-Romani sentiment =

Racism against Romani people

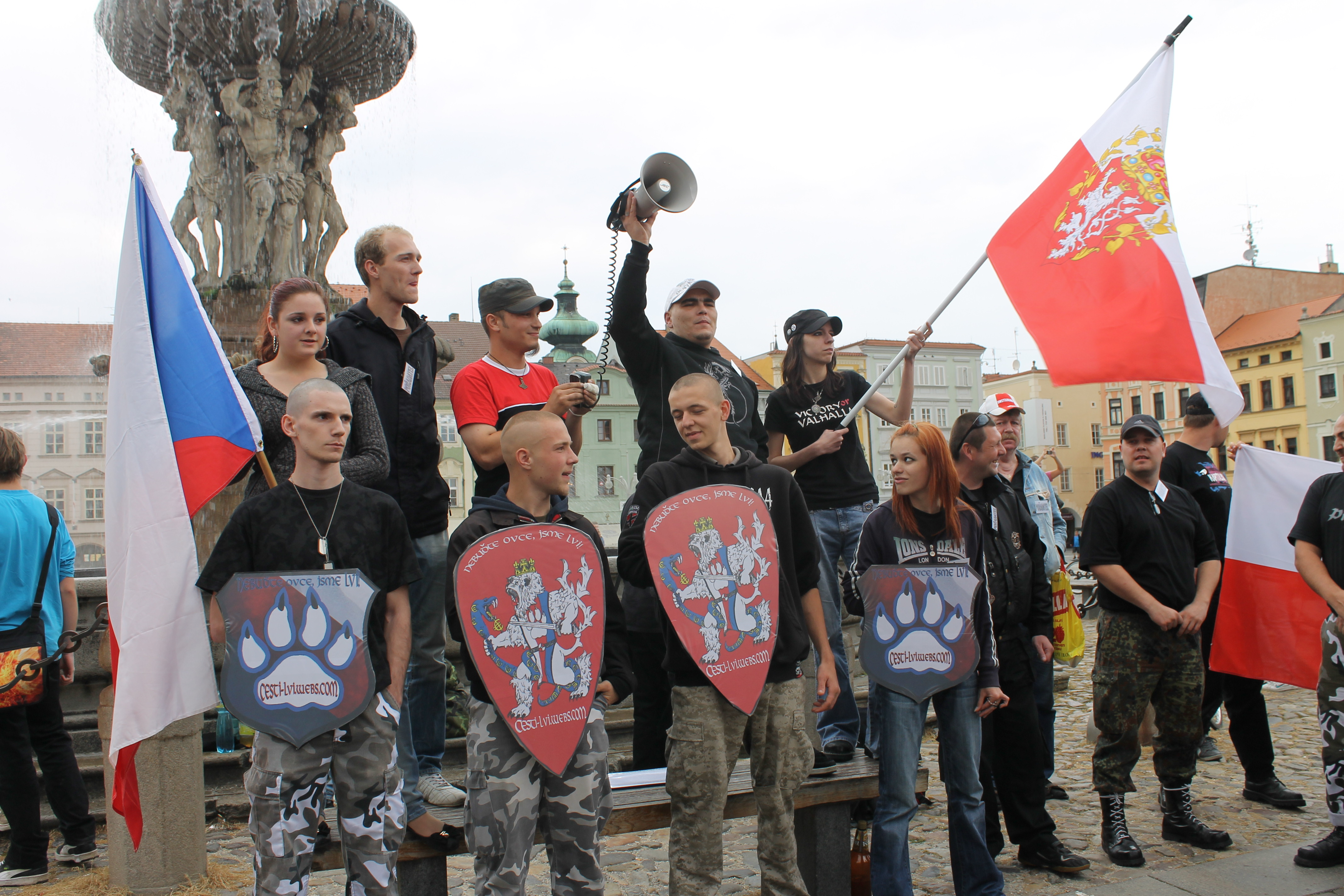
Anti-Romani protest in České Budějovice, Czech Republic, 29 June 2013

Anti-Romani sentiment (also called antigypsyism, anti-Romanyism, antiziganism, ziganophobia, or Romaphobia) consists of hostility, prejudice, discrimination, nativism, racism, and xenophobia which is specifically directed at Romani people.

The Romani, who are believed to have migrated from India to Europe during the Middle Ages, have faced a long history of discrimination and persecution. Arriving Romanis were seen as suspect, in part due to their nomadic nature. Romanis were suspected of theft and fraud, pickpocketing, black magic, prostitution, and stealing children. Many countries passed laws restricting Romanis' ability to work and live. For centuries, Romani people in Europe were persecuted, enslaved, hanged, and burned. As a result, relations between the Romani people and other ethnic groups are frequently marked by mistrust and fear. Romani people often hide their ethnicity out of fear of discrimination and stereotyping. Some Romani people avoid non-Roma because they consider them marime.

The term “gypsy,” long used to refer to Romani people, was rejected as an exonym by the first World Romani Congress in 1971. The term evolved from the Middle English "Egipcien," out of a misconception that arriving Roma migrants hailed from Egypt. While some Romani embrace the term, it is largely frowned upon due to its association with misconceptions and stereotypes in which Romani people are portrayed as nomads who roam around and engage in questionable, criminal or illegal activities, which is exemplified by the term "to gyp". During the COVID-19 pandemic, hate speech against Roma people in Europe increased. A 2024 United States Department of State report raised concerns about anti-Romani sentiment across Europe. The Romani community in Europe encounters challenges including restricted access to quality education and obstacles in integrating into the labor market, which contribute to increased poverty and social exclusion, as well as inadequate healthcare and substandard living conditions. Romani children are assigned to segregated "special" schools, where restricted curricula hinder their opportunities. Roma children and women are also particularly vulnerable to human trafficking. Romani people are often stereotyped as evil beings prone to stealing, lying, having the "evil eye," and resisting assimilation. Romani people are considered musically talented but ultimately malicious, violent, criminals with a propensity for thievery and deception. The prevalent portrayal of travelling artisan Romani communities as mythical and exotic savages, which has existed since their arrival in Europe, includes characteristics that imply the criminalization of Romani individuals from the very beginning. These allegations highlight the Roma's engagement in theft, their supposed inclination to abduct children, kidnapping and their perceived spy-like behavior.

The key factors that contribute to the persistence of discrimination against the Roma are the lack of institutional recognition and the public's lack of knowledge about their historical experiences, including centuries of enslavement in the Danubian Principalities, forced assimilation, and genocide during the Holocaust. Historical and contemporary evidence indicate that other societies in Europe have systematically excluded Roma, contributing to the persistence of socioeconomic inequality and other forms of discrimination.

The Roma are regarded as one of the most mysterious races in the world, often described as nomads with no country or permanent homeland. The Romani people have been viewed throughout history as experts in black magic and Satanism who are allied with Satan. Theodore Balsamon cautioned the Greeks against engaging with the Romani, referring to them as "ventriloquists and wizards" associated with the Devil. Balsamon also noted that Romani individuals were seen carrying snakes wrapped around their bodies, claiming to predict the future.

The relationship between Romani people and non-Roma outsiders has long been marked by mistrust, discrimination, and violence. Many Roma harbor distrust toward non-Roma individuals. The pejorative term "gypsy" remains prevalent in Western culture, appearing both in openly prejudiced contexts and in seemingly harmless ways. The so-called "gypsy aesthetic" is often appropriated in fashion and music festivals, commercializing an idealized version of Roma culture without recognizing its painful history or the ongoing systemic racism faced by Roma communities. Negative stereotypes continue to appear in the media, where Roma are frequently depicted as criminals, beggars, or primitive people. Nevertheless, some contemporary Roma artists and activists are resisting these portrayals by producing their own works to reclaim their story and encourage positive self-representation. Romani organizations and advocates are challenging the use of the slur "gypsy," promoting instead the terms "Roma," "Romani," or specific subgroup names, while also striving to increase awareness of authentic Romani history and culture. The concept of the "gypsy" in Western culture is a mix of romanticism and racism. It is a constructed identity that has enabled non-Roma society to define itself and has been used to justify centuries of discrimination and violence against the actual people it purports to represent.

Certain members of the Roma community hold the belief that a curse has been placed upon them, resulting in a life characterized by suffering and poverty. These are purportedly the words of the renowned magician who placed a curse on Cen, the forebear of all Romani people. This narrative illustrates how the Romani people account for their curse of enduring poverty and social exclusion.

== Etymology ==
There are many names of the Romani people, with gypsy perhaps the most common in English, though today it is considered pejorative. The English terms antiziganism and ziganophobia come from zigan, a root used in many European languages' versions of gypsy, including Hungarian (czigány or cigány), German (Zigeuner), and French (tzigane or tsignane). Ultimately the root zigan likely derives from Medieval Greek ἀθίγγανος (athínganos) meaning "no touch" or roughly "untouchable".

== History ==
While the period of the first wave of migration of Roma from South Asia is a matter of debate, a wave is believed to have occurred in an attempt to escape the consequences of the invasions by Mahmud of Ghazni. The historical persecution and discrimination of Romani people is also thought to have been rooted in the lowest strata of the Hindu caste system. The ill-treatment of the Doma caste may have compelled them to flee India. Genetic research and historical evidence suggest that the Roma originated from the Dalit, or "untouchable," groups in India. They were commonly associated with occupations such as musicians, dancers, and entertainers, and may have left because of the severe and inflexible caste system that subjected them to social exclusion.

Ian Hancock highlighted that the origins of the Roma can be traced back to the warrior class known as the Rajput warriors. The Rajputs, referred to as "Sons of Kings," represent an ancient martial group that resided in what is now Rajasthan and engaged in various conquests across Asia. They were forcibly taken to Europe and compelled to labor in metallurgy. Hancock remarked that these individuals, 'did not belong to the Kshatriya (warrior) caste, but alongside the Rajputs, whether as captives of war or as victors defeating the enemy, they departed from India. Subsequently, the Roma migrated westward along the Silk Road following these military campaigns towards Persia and Armenia. The Dom caste is believed to have been cursed by Lord Shiva after a member of their community, Kallu Dom, attempted to steal an earring from Goddess Parvati in Hindu mythology, resulting in their discrimination and marginalization. The Roma people also refer to themselves as Roma chave, meaning "sons of Rama," which suggests their historical connection to Hinduism. Many well-preserved Romani legends point to India as their homeland, calling it Baro Than, or "the Great Land." Studies of their language, traditions, rituals, and physical characteristics support the conclusion that the majority of Romani people in Europe are descended from Hindus originating in India. The Romani people are believed to be a mixture of the Dom and the Jats. Pischel suggested that conflicts during the Islamic conquests of northern India might have forced the ancestors of the Roma to leave the region. De Goeje proposed that the Roma could have been followers of the Jats, a warrior group that served in the Sassanid armies. The Romani people are also thought to descend from the Dom, a low caste in India that were beggars, thieves, prostitutes, musicians, and grave-diggers, who gradually left India over centuries to avoid social exclusion.

The antipathy, prejudicial attitudes, and discriminatory treatment directed toward the Romani population have historical roots in Hindu society and the marginalized Dom caste from which they descended prior to their departure from India, undertaken to evade the social ostracization inherent in the hierarchical and inflexible Hindu caste system. According to Hindu mythology and Indian folklore traditions, the Dom community is said to have originated as members of the Brahmin caste who incurred a curse from Lord Shiva as punishment for theft, resulting in their transformation into individuals responsible for cremating the deceased and becoming ritually impure. This mythological curse potentially provides context for understanding the historical marginalization experienced by the Dom caste, which subsequently prompted their descendants, the Romani people, to emigrate from India.

The Romani people trace their origins to the northwestern region of what is now India. Approximately a thousand years ago, this area may have encompassed parts of Balochistan, Sindh, and Multan, which are located in present-day Pakistan.

Following their exit from India, the Romani people gradually made their way into Afghanistan, Persia, and Byzantium before ultimately reaching Europe. During their westward migration, it is thought that two main migration routes emerged: the Roma and Sinti traveled overland through Byzantium and eventually crossed Thrace, whereas the Dom people moved along the Middle Eastern coast and entered Egypt. According to Ian Hancock, the name Roma originates from the Hindi word डोम (Doma). Linguists have traced the migration routes of the Romani people into Europe by analyzing words borrowed from other languages. These linguistic influences suggest that as they moved westward, they passed through regions such as Afghanistan, Iran, Armenia, Asia Minor, and Greece. The Romani language shows significant influence from Armenian and Byzantine Greek vocabulary. Based on the Indian theory, the group that eventually became known as the Roma departed from the Hindu Kush mountain range, on the border between modern-day Afghanistan and Pakistan, and traveled along the southern coast of the Caspian Sea. From there, in the fifth century, they moved into the Persian Gulf area and the Arab empires of the southern Caucasus.

Other evidence indicates that the Romani people traditionally belonged to service-oriented castes, such as entertainers, blacksmiths, and animal caretakers. They might have departed from India in search of new jobs and opportunities in the West, traveling through Persia and eventually reaching Europe. The persecution of the Roma and Sinti is largely due to the distinctiveness of Romani culture within Europe. Their close-knit communities maintained much of their Indian cultural and genetic heritage, making them appear foreign and unaccepted by white Europeans and European society. Around the year 950, Hamza al-Isfahani recounted that the Persian ruler, Shah Bahram Gur, travelled to Hindustan to meet King Shangul. Bahram, a name common among many Persian kings, requested that Shangul select musicians, both men and women. In response, Shangul chose approximately 12,000 individuals from the Luri tribe who were skilled in playing the oud. Firdouzi later retold this story. According to historical sources, this tribe was also known as the Zott and referred to themselves as "Romas," a term derived from the Sanskrit word meaning "man of the low caste of musician."

As nomads, they had to have occupations that were portable or easily abandoned. Consequently, many were livestock traders, animal trainers and performers, tinkers (metalworkers and utensil repairers), and musicians; the women practiced fortune-telling, sold potions, begged, and worked as entertainers. Because of their involvement in selling love potions and fortune-telling, the Roma often faced persecution. Singing and dancing have consistently been the primary means of income for the Romani people. Romani people were often harassed by witch hunters.

Romani people first appeared in the Balkans in the 9th century, followed by western Europe in the early 15th century, and northern Europe in the early 16th century. Their arrival in Europe coincided with the persecution of the Romani people as witches. Romani people were repeatedly arrested and accused of sorcery and witchcraft because they often dabbled in magical cures and fortune-telling.

The Romani people didn't self-identify as an ancient Indian national culture when they first arrived in Europe.

Europeans shamed Romani people with dark skin for their skin colour. Europeans often associated dark skin with ugliness, primitivism and Black People .

Laws targeting Romani people have been enacted almost since they arrived in Europe. Initially, there was a rumor that they were Christian Egyptians escaping persecution, which led to the term "Gypsies," derived from "Egyptians." However, because they had darker skin and did not live the settled lifestyle of local European peasants, they were immediately viewed with suspicion by Europeans. In 1721, Austro-Hungarian Emperor Karl VI initiated the "first governmental plan to exterminate Romanies," which applied to the region that would later become Germany. Other countries, including Romania, France, and Spain, subsequently passed laws aimed at relocating and killing Romani people. By the 19th century, scholars in Germany and elsewhere in Europe described Romanies and Jews as inferior and even referred to them as "the excrement of humanity." Charles Darwin, in 1871, singled out these two ethnic groups as not "culturally advanced" compared with other territorially settled peoples. This reflects how both groups, lacking an official homeland and country, were seen as somehow less evolved. Across Europe, people had settled in towns, mingling with neighbors and establishing social orders based on fixed lifestyles. The Romani people, as a nomadic people, did not fit into this system. Their distinct religious and cultural practices fueled rumors that Romani people were magicians or vampires, which led to their social exclusion.

The Romani people’s distinctiveness and otherness were perceived as exotic, especially because they generally had dark hair, dark eyes, and swarthy complexions. Yet, their nomadic way of life also contributed to their reputation for dishonesty, minor theft, and homelessness. They were frequently met with hostility. Being stateless and foreign travelers, Romani people across regions from Western Europe to the Balkans faced harsh laws and legal punishments, which sometimes escalated to vigilante attacks including arson and murder. The portrayal of Romani people as thieves and dishonest individuals frequently appears in medieval records. Jealous craft guilds, aiming to protect their local monopolies, tried to restrict traditional Romani trades such as metalworking and basketmaking. Due to these limitations, Romani people increasingly turned to begging and theft, which reinforced the negative stereotype that had followed them since their arrival in Europe. With the rise of the Reformation, pilgrims lost their previously respected status, and begging also faced strong criticism. Although local parishes were willing to aid their own poor, foreign beggars were often turned away.

Europeans believed that the Romani people were cursed because of Cain. Another legend, likely brought from India since it mentions Mekran as the location of the event, tells that, due to a sorcerer's deceit, the Romani leader named Chen was forced to marry his sister, Guin, or KaN, which resulted in the curse of wandering upon their people. This is why the Romani are called Chen-Guin. When the Romani people, expelled from their homeland, arrived at Mekran, a remarkable machine was created whose wheel would not turn until an evil spirit disguised as a sage told the chief, Chen, that it would only move if he married his sister Guin. He followed this advice, and the wheel began to turn, but from this incestuous marriage, the people not only received the name Chenguin but also the curse placed upon them by Muslim saints, condemning them to be wanderers, excluded from the rest of humanity.

After leaving South Asia, the Romani people arrived in Persia, and lived under the rule of early caliphates. They faced persecution and were later expelled from Persia. The circumstances of their arrival are debated and are known through a blend of folklore and historical accounts. One story suggests they first came as low-caste mercenary soldiers hired to defend Persia against the Arab threat from the west. Another viewed their migration from the Indian subcontinent as an escape from the Mongol invasions coming from the east. According to Firdusi in his poem Shahnameh, around the year 420, the Persian king Bahram V (reigned 420–438) requested the Indian ruler to send twelve thousand Dom musicians to entertain his people and distract them from their daily hardships. These Doms—one of the many names used for the group—were rewarded with grain and land to help them thrive. However, in this tale, the Dom were seen as lazy; they consumed the grain but avoided farming. Eventually, the king had to banish them to a life of constant wandering, surviving through smuggling and begging. After the death of Caliph al-Ma'mun in 833, the Romani people’s situation worsened. Al-Ma’mūn had strongly supported resolving conflicts through law, but after his death, real power shifted to Baghdad's provincial governors in Persia, who were neither tolerant nor inclined to use legal means to address social issues. The following year, Romani communities were expelled from Persia. In the centuries that followed, expulsion and persecution became a recurring reality for Romani people.

From Persia, the Romani people settled in Armenia for some time. The Lom people remained in Armenia, largely integrating into Armenian society. The Romani people then migrated through Anatolia before settling in the Balkans during the Byzantine period. Unfortunately, their arrival coincided with a period of increasing intolerance toward non-Christians following the Crusades (1095–1270). The Roma were viewed as non-Christians and sometimes even as despised Muslims.

The British banished Romani people to Barbados and Jamaica.

Spanish Roma women were often portrayed as attractive yet lewd and dangerous. English Gypsylorist George Borrow has stated that 'no females in the world can be more licentious in word and gesture, in dance and in song, than the Gitanas.’

Romani women are stereotyped to be free-spirited, strong, deviant, sexually arousing, alluring, dismissive, and sexually available. Romani women are exoticized and sexualized in European literature, and this hypersexualization of Romani women has dehumanized them. Stereotypes regarding Romani men tend to emphasize criminal behavior more than the sexual stereotypes associated with Romani women. Romani males are often labeled as parasites, thieves, and unclean - perceived as threatening yet belittled. One factor contributing to this negative portrayal is the perception that the Romani male, as opposed to the Roma female, is viewed as a possible 'home-breaker'. The Roma male may take a housedweller virgin, reminiscent of D.H. Lawrence (1930), or kidnap a woman to claim her as his own within Roma society.

The term 'Gypsy' evokes a multitude of images in the minds of those who are not part of the Roma community. While some romanticize their sense of freedom, others condemn them for perceived antisocial or criminal behavior. Consequently, Romani people have been portrayed as both subjects of exotic myths and targets of intense prejudice. They are often seen as either romantic figures or criminal outsiders, ranging from thieves to musically talented and artistic. The Roma are viewed as being 'free' from societal constraints, embodying a natural existence that does not conform to European societal norms. Romani people are frequently stereotyped as skilled musicians and talented dancers, often imagined living in traditional horse-drawn Vardo wagons.

The Romani people's nomadic culture and Asian origins may also have incited hatred among some racist Europeans and white supremacists. Romani culture is nomadic and doesn't conform to European culture and the European way of life. Many Roma avoid getting a job, and this caused Europeans to resent them.

Romani people are also believed to have descended from the Criminal and Wandering Tribes of India and deported prisoners of war due to their supposed parasitic, thievish nature. Romani people were characterised as robbers, murderers, hangmen, and entertainers like those tribes in India due to the Hindu caste system.

The romanticized and patronizing stereotypes of the Roma and Sinti have fluctuated between viewing them as "noble savages" and as unassimilable groups unwilling to accept any official efforts at integration. The label "Gypsy" has consistently been tied not only to cultural or identity aspects but also to a way of life and behavior that have often been stigmatized. Marginalized and criminal portrayals of the Roma have dominated, with some depictions approaching inhumanity and cannibalism, while others have associated them with poverty, sexual immorality, promiscuity, and both hygienic and moral contamination.

=== In the Middle Ages ===
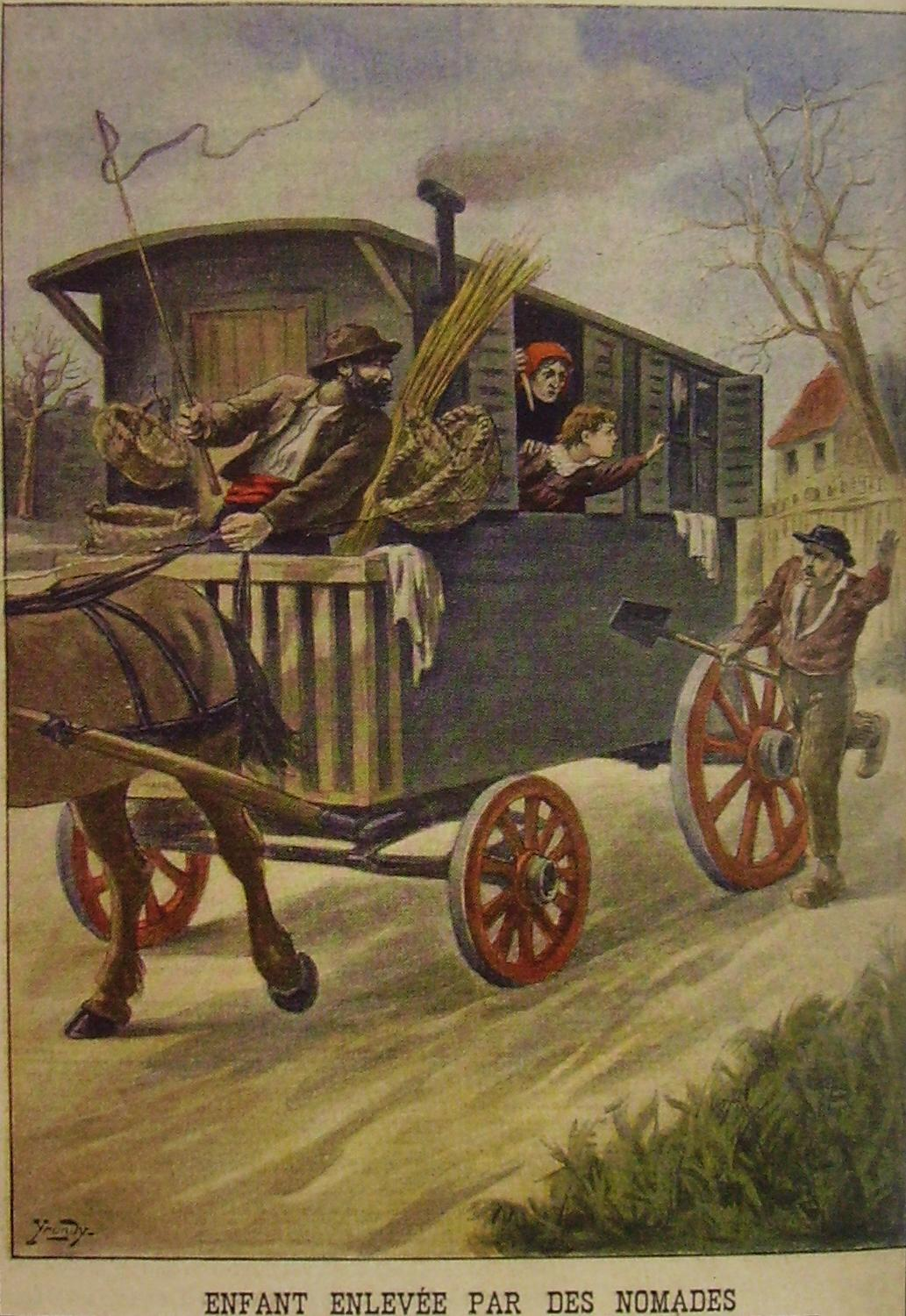
A French poster depicting a child being kidnapped by nomads

In the early 13th-century Byzantine records, the Atsínganoi are mentioned as "wizards ... who are satanically inspired and pretend to predict the unknown".

The enslavement of the Roma, mostly taken as prisoners of war, in the Danubian Principalities is first documented in the late 15th century. In these countries, extensive legislation dividing the Roma into different groups according to their owners, including nobles, monasteries, and the state, was enacted.

By the 16th century, many Romanies worked as musicians, metal artisans, and soldiers. As the Ottoman Empire expanded, it relegated the Romani, who were seen as having "no visible permanent professional affiliation", to the lowest rung of the social ladder.

Romani people were charged with sorcery, witchcraft, child stealing, and spying. Romani people were also often said to be noisy, immoral, and asocial.

The Romani people were initially regarded with distrust due to their dark skin and nomadic way of life. The Persian poet Firdausi had written in the tenth century about the Romani people, stating, "No washing ever whitens the black Gypsy." Throughout the subsequent centuries, the history of the Romani people was characterized by discrimination, scapegoating, and oppression. Romani people were accused of cannibalism, spreading filth and disease, and being spies, sorcerers, swindlers, thieves, beggars, and tricksters. During the medieval and early modern periods in Europe, various efforts were made to either expel the Roma or assimilate them. While churches and trade guilds generally held a negative view of the Roma, some European noblemen welcomed Romani musicians and entertainers into their homes. In Western Europe, the Sinti were eventually accepted as migrant laborers and partially integrated into local communities. Yet, the wandering Roma resisted assimilation despite numerous prohibitions on their nomadic lifestyle, clothing, music, and language. The authorities subjected Roma to torture and punishment, and 'gypsy hunts' became a popular pastime in several European countries, including Germany and Holland.

C.J. Popp Serboianu said the Romani character was to be lazy, work-shy, and sly. He stated, "Because Gypsies (generally) lack notions of morality, they allow their instincts to rule them more easily, they have no sense of honor, they are greedy, wasteful, intemperate with food and drink, lecherous, and frivolous. However, the opinions concerning their "loose" morals vary considerably". Other Gypsyologists claimed that Romani women in Spain practiced prostitution. Popp Serboianu claimed that Romani people have absolutely no sexual control and that Romani people's love life only constitutes indulgence in sex and sensuality. Dutch encyclopedias also claimed the Romani people were thieves.

Europeans associated Romani people with evil and the Devil.

=== 16th and 17th centuries ===
In 16th-century Royal Hungary, during Ottoman expansion in Hungary, the Crown developed strong anti-Romani policies, since these people were considered suspect as possible Turkish spies or as a fifth column. In this atmosphere, they were expelled from many locations and increasingly adopted a nomadic way of life.

The first anti-Romani legislation was issued in the March of Moravia in 1538, and three years later, Ferdinand I ordered that Romani in his realm be expelled after a series of fires in Prague.

In 1545, the Diet of Augsburg declared that "whosoever kills a Gypsy, will be guilty of no murder". The subsequent massive killing spree which took place across the empire later prompted the government to step in to "forbid the drowning of Romani women and children".

In England, the Egyptians Act 1530, passed by the Crown in Parliament, banned Romani from entering the country and required those already living there to leave within 16 days. Failure to do so could result in confiscation of property, imprisonment, and deportation. The act was amended by the Egyptians Act 1554, which directed them to abandon their "naughty, idle and ungodly life and company" and adopt a settled lifestyle. For those who failed to adhere to a sedentary existence, the Privy Council interpreted the act to permit the execution of non-complying Romani "as a warning to others".

In 1660, the Romani were prohibited from residing in France by King Louis XIV.

=== 18th century ===
In 1710, Joseph I, Holy Roman Emperor, issued an edict against the Romani, ordering "that all adult males were to be hanged without trial, whereas women and young males were to be flogged and banished forever." In addition, in the kingdom of Bohemia, Romani men were to have their right ears cut off; in the March of Moravia, the left ear was to be cut off. In other parts of Austria, they would be branded on the back with a branding iron, representing the gallows. These mutilations enabled authorities to identify the individuals as Romani on their second arrest. The edict encouraged local officials to hunt down Romani in their areas by levying a fine of 100 Reichsthaler on those who failed to do so. Anyone who helped a Romani was to be punished by doing forced labor for half a year. The result was mass killings of Romani across the Holy Roman Empire. In 1721, Charles VI amended the decree to include the execution of adult female Romani, while children were "to be put in hospitals for education".

The Great Gypsy Round-up was a raid authorized and organized by King Ferdinand VI of Spain in 1749, that led to the arrest of most Romani people in Spain. Although a majority were released after a few months, many others spent several years imprisoned and subject to forced labor.

In 1774, Maria Theresa of Austria issued an edict forbidding marriages between Romani. When a Romani woman married a non-Romani, she had to produce proof of "industrious household service and familiarity with Catholic tenets", a male Romani "had to prove his ability to support a wife and children", and "Gypsy children over the age of five were to be taken away and brought up in non-Romani families."

In 2007, the Romanian government established a panel to study the 18th- and 19th-century period of Romani slavery by princes, local landowners, and monasteries. This officially legalized practice was first documented in the 15th century. Slavery of Romani was outlawed in the Romanian Principalities of Moldavia and Wallachia in around 1856.

Romani men were seen as a threat to womanhood in the Balkans. Although white men raped enslaved Romani women during slavery in Romania, enslaved Romani men were castrated or burnt alive if they had sex with a white woman. Romani women were a subordination at the hands of white supremacy.

Vlad the Impaler tortured Romani people for entertainment.

=== 19th century ===
Governments regularly cited petty theft committed by Romani as justification for regulating and persecuting them. In 1899, the Nachrichtendienst für die Sicherheitspolizei in Bezug auf Zigeuner (transl. Intelligence service for the security police concerning gypsies) was set up in Munich under the direction of Alfred Dillmann, and catalogued data on all Romani individuals throughout the German-speaking lands. It did not officially close down until 1970. The results were published in 1905 in Dillmann's Zigeuner-Buch, which was used in the following years as justification for the Porajmos. It described the Romani people as a "plague" and a "menace", but almost exclusively characterized "Gypsy crime" as trespassing and the theft of food.

In the United States, during Congressional debate in 1866 over the Fourteenth Amendment to the United States Constitution which would subsequently grant citizenship to all persons born within U.S. territory, an objection raised was that a consequence of enacting the amendment would be to grant citizenship to Roma and other groups perceived by some as undesirable.

Pennsylvania Senator Edgar Cowan stated,

...I am as liberal as anybody toward the rights of all people, but I am unwilling, on the part of my State, to give up the right that she claims, and that she may exercise, and exercise before very long, of expelling a certain number of people who invade her borders; who owe her no allegiance; who pretend to owe none; who recognize no authority in her government; who have a distinct, independent government of their own—an imperium in imperio; who pay no taxes; who never perform military service; who do nothing, in fact, which becomes a citizen, and perform none of the duties which devolve upon him, but, on the other hand, have no homes, pretend to own no land, live nowhere, settle as trespassers where ever they go, and whose sole merit is a universal swindle; who delight in it, who boast of it, and whose adroitness and cunning is of such a transcendent character that no skill can serve to correct or punish it; I mean the Gypsies. They wander in gangs in my State... These people live in the country and are born in the country. They infest society.

In response, Senator John Conness of California observed,

I have lived in the United States now many a year, and really I have heard more about Gypsies within the last two or three months than I have heard before in my life. It cannot be because they have increased so much of late. It cannot be because they have been felt to be particularly oppressive in this or that locality. It must be that the Gypsy element is to be added to our political agitation, so that hereafter the negro alone shall not claim our entire attention.

Bulgaria 1876: a pogrom, by villagers of Koprivshtitsa massacre the Muslim Roma.

=== Porajmos ===
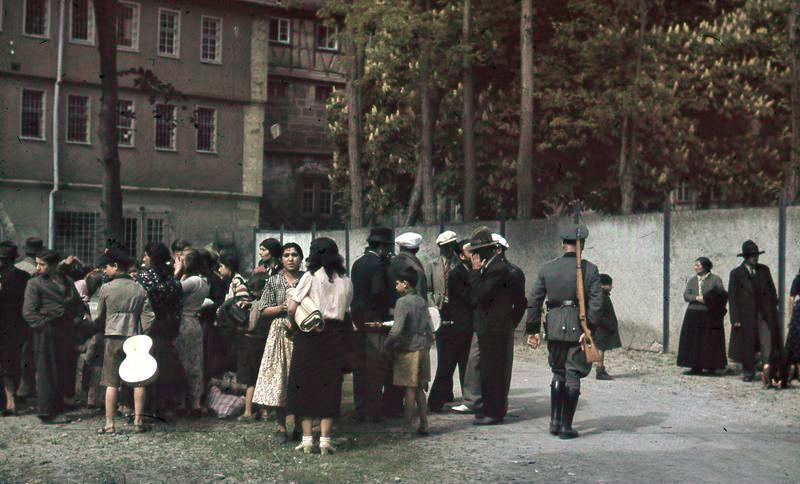
German Nazi deportation of Sinti and Roma from Asperg, 1940

The persecution of the Romani people reached a peak during World War II, in the Porajmos (literally, the devouring), a descriptive neologism for the Nazi genocide of Romanis during the Holocaust. Unlike Jews who were an ethnic group with a religion, with over 90% of racial Jews practicing the religion, thus making it easy to trace them via synagogue and church records, Romani did not have any way of identification so racial experts like Robert Ritter and Eva Justin were called to do racial examinations of Roma communities across Europe. Heinrich Himmler issued a directive on December 16, 1942, a directive stating that all Roma residing in the German Reich were to be deported to Auschwitz and killed. The "Auschwitz Decree" represented the ultimate disclosure of a plan that had effectively been in place since 1938 and had already been partially implemented, specifically aimed at the total eradication and extinction of "Gypsies".

In June 1936, a Central Office was established in Munich to "Combat the Gypsy Nuisance." This office served as the central hub for a national databank concerning Roma and Sinti. Robert Ritter, a medical anthropologist affiliated with the Reich Health Office, determined that a significant percentage, specifically fifty percent, of the Roma indigenous to Germany were classified as "of mixed blood." He characterized them as "the offspring of unions with the white German criminal asocial sub-proletariat" and labeled Roma and Sinti as "primitive" individuals who were "incapable of genuine social adaptation." In 1938, Ritter authored two articles that examined the "Gypsy problem" and proposed potential solutions. He asserted that previous policies addressing the Romani people had been unsuccessful because they focused on forcing the Roma to settle. "Here," he stated, "we clearly recognize that we are confronted with primitive nomads of a foreign race whom neither education nor punitive measures can transform into sedentary citizens." He contended that the Roma should be permitted to maintain their nomadic lifestyle, although they should also be segregated from the broader German populace. It was crucial, however, that all Romani people have access to stable and honest employment. The most challenging groups to manage were the Zigeunermischlinge and the Jenische (White Gypsies), whom Ritter regarded as "a population of criminal clans and asocial elements."

The Romani communities in Central and Eastern Europe were less organized in the same place unlike Jewish communities who were almost all in the Former Pale; as a result, the Einsatzgruppen, the mobile killing squads which travelled from village to village and massacred their Romani inhabitants where they lived, typically left few to no records of the number of Roma who they killed in this way. Even though a significant amount of documentary evidence of mass murder was produced in a few cases, it is more difficult to assess the actual number of victims. Historians estimate that the Germans and their collaborators killed between 220,000 and 500,000 Romani—25% to over 50% of the slightly fewer than 1 million Roma who lived in Europe at that time. More thorough research by Ian Hancock revealed the death toll to be at about 1.5 million.

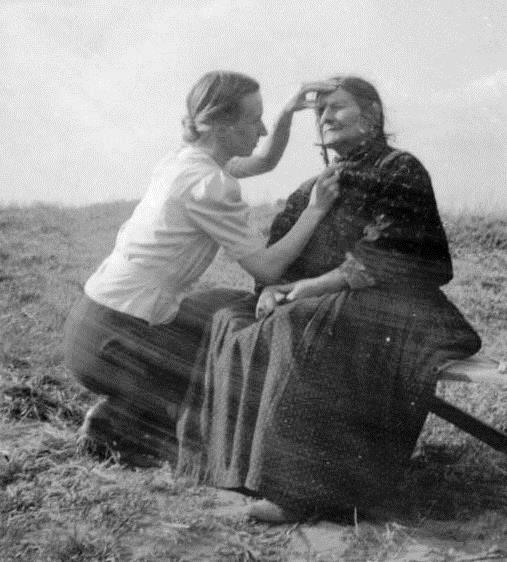
Eva Justin checking the facial characteristics of a Romani woman as part of her "racial studies"

Nazi racial ideology put Romani, Jews, Blacks, and some Slavs at the bottom of the racial scale. The German Nuremberg Laws of 1935 stripped Jews of citizenship, confiscated property, and criminalized sexual relationships and marriage with Aryans. These laws were extended to Romani as Nazi policy towards Roma and Sinti was complicated by pseudo-historic racialist theories, which could be contradictory, namely that the Romani were of Egyptian ancestry. While they considered Romani grossly inferior, they believed the Roma people had some distant "Aryan" roots that had been corrupted by admixture with Semitic and Black blood. The Romani are actually a distinctly European people of considerable Northwestern Indian descent, or what is literally considered to be Aryan. Similar to European Jews, specifically the Ashkenazi, the Romani people quickly acquired European genes via enslavement and intermarriage upon their arrival in Europe 1,000 years ago. Nazis considered Roma to be "asocial" and “habitual criminals”. Police arrested Romani beggars, vagrants, homeless and alcoholics and sent them to concentration camps.

In the Protectorate of Bohemia and Moravia, the Nazi genocide of the Romani was so thorough that it exterminated the majority of Bohemian Romani speakers, eventually leading to the language's extinction in 1970 with the death of its last known speaker, Hana Šebková. In Denmark, Greece, and a small number of other countries, resistance by the native population thwarted planned Nazi deportations and extermination of the Romani. In most conquered countries (e.g., the Baltic states), local cooperation with the Nazis expedited the murder of almost all local Romani. In Croatia, the Croatian collaborators of the Ustaše were so vicious that only a minor remnant of Croatian Romani survived the killings. In Serbia, Serbian collaborators alongside with SS murdered majority of Serbian Roma population, in 1942 Serbia "Roma and Jewish questions were solved"

In 1982, West Germany formally recognized that genocide had been committed against the Romani. Before this they had often claimed that, unlike Jews, Roma and Sinti were not targeted for racial reasons, but for "criminal" reasons, invoking antiziganist stereotype. In modern Holocaust scholarship, the Porajmos has been increasingly recognized as a genocide committed simultaneously with the Shoah.

Interracial marriages between Germans and Roma were forbidden. The Nazis believed Romani people carried alien blood and therefore shouldn't marry white Aryans. The Nazis also argued that the Romani people's tainted blood led to criminality, parasitical behavior, laziness, and promiscuity.

The Nazis also discriminated against the Romani people because they believed their nomadic lifestyle made them spies who could leak information. After invading Poland, anti-Romani policies became more significant, Roma were put in Jewish ghettos and were systematically exterminated after the Auschwitz Degree. The Wehrmacht leadership worried that Romani people, especially those who traveled, could be spies and might leak information about German military operations in Poland and other occupied territories. On the Western Front, Romani people were also viewed as a national security threat. In France, Romani people and other groups labeled as “nomadic” were seen as outsiders who might disclose military movements to the Germans. As a result, French authorities imposed stricter controls on traveling Roma. When Germany occupied France, the Nazi regime intensified these restrictions even further.

=== During Medieval Germany ===
Before the Nazi genocide, the first anti-Roma law was issued in Germany in 1416. The first Nazi document that mentions "the implementation of the total solution to the Gypsy issue at either a national or international level" was created under the supervision of State Secretary Hans Pfundtner from the Reich Ministry of the Interior in March 1936. According to German collective memory, Romani people lived by pickpocketing, thievery, robbery, palm reading, witchcraft and magic. Such allegations are evident in the Holy Roman Empire's Reichstag decision as early as 1497, which decreed that Romani people were neither allowed to pass through nor be tolerated within the empire's territory. The 1530 Reichstag ruling reiterated this stance and explicitly accused Romanis of spying for the Turks, branding them as enemies of the Christian world. This aspect of the Romani image diminished after the Turks retreated from Europe in the seventeenth century. The use of the term "pagan" as synonymous with Gypsy indicated that German Christian society did not acknowledge the Romani claim to Christianity. In his 1550 work, Cosmographia, Sebastian Münster argued that Gypsies lacked any true faith. Their association with black magic reinforced this perception, and they were seen as connected to satanic forces. In Europe, the Romani people’s dark skin was described as black, a color traditionally linked in folklore to the devil and the realm of evil. Despite Martin Luther's condemnation of Romani fortune tellers as deceivers, there was simultaneously a strong demand among Christians for the Romani people's alleged supernatural abilities to bless, predict the future, and heal. Swiss alchemist and physician Paracelsus noted that one could learn black magic from elderly Romani women and regarded their practice of palmistry with some respect. The church's stance—and even that of the Spanish Inquisition—toward Gypsy black magic was relatively lenient, and Romani people were never targeted for religious persecution because of it. Unlike antisemitism, hostility toward Roma lacked a religious zeal and demonizing traits. For instance, while Romani people were accused of abducting Christian children, they were not accused of killing them for religious reasons. Romani people were considered parasites and subhumans because of their rootlessness. Europeans were suspicious of Romani people and believed them to be idolatrous, engaging in witchcraft. Images of Roma as thieves and kidnappers of children spread throughout Germany and the rest of Europe. German anthropologist Eva Justin observed that the only area in which Romani children perform well is through music and song.

Initially, Roma and Sinti were welcomed and well-liked by the Holy Roman Empire, but perceptions quickly shifted, leading to their being regarded as heathens and spies for Muslims. The Catholic Church significantly contributed to the development and perpetuation of negative stereotypes about Roma and Sinti by linking their dark skin to notions of darkness and evil. By the close of the fifteenth century, it was claimed that Roma and Sinti were in collusion and in league with the devil. Kenrick and Puxon note that "the belief that blackness signifies inferiority and malevolence was already deeply entrenched in the Western psyche. The nearly black skin of many Romani people rendered them targets of this bias." The rise of the "Gypsy image" was also closely associated with the advent of academic "Gypsy studies" - "Zigeunerkunde" - in the eighteenth and nineteenth centuries in Europe, which were influenced by a prevalent perception of Roma and Sinti as bandits, thieves, sorcerers, and emissaries from an exotic realm. Early "Gypsy studies" were characterized by the belief in the "Gypsy's" unchangeability, an "oriental" Asian heritage, and their foreignness. Due to their unusual appearance and lifestyle, Roma and Sinti became a favored subject for projection. By capitalizing on the widespread image of Roma and Sinti as thieves, beggars, and beguilers who wander from place to place, they were categorized as the definitive "Other" and perceived as a danger to the German nation. The investigations conducted by anthropologists and "Gypsy folklorists," including Heinrich Grellmann, Christian C. Rüdiger, and August F. Pott, concentrated on the alleged ethnic "inferiority," criminal tendencies, and laziness of Roma and Sinti, thereby significantly influencing the policies of nation-states towards Romani communities. When Roma and Sinti first arrived in medieval Europe, they were welcomed by certain European courts. However, it was not long before they became targets of hostility from Europeans wary of these newcomers. Whether due to habit or coercion, many Roma led a nomadic lifestyle, which further incited the animosity of others. The broader European society branded them as thieves and tricksters, claiming they exploited their musical talents and physical allure to deceive the unsuspecting and bring them to their downfall. Several prevalent attitudes towards the Roma during the medieval era mirrored anti-Jewish sentiments. Non-Jewish Europeans wrongfully accused Jews of abducting Christian children for the purpose of using their blood; similarly, non-Roma accused Roma of kidnapping children for nefarious reasons. Like the Jews, the Romani people were often scapegoated during times of calamity, such as plagues or earthquakes. Their adversaries alleged that they poisoned wells, engaged in sorcery, and consorted with the devil and demonic forces. While European folklore did not hold the Romani people responsible for the death of Jesus, it did accuse them, due to their reputation as metalworkers, of forging the nails that pierced his body. According to European legends, the Romani people, like the Jews, were believed to have been cursed by God to wander the earth without ever finding a homeland. One widely circulated narrative suggested that while still in Egypt, the Roma attempted to obstruct Joseph, Mary, and the infant Jesus from seeking refuge from King Herod, resulting in their punishment of eternal homelessness.

=== Nazi Ideology ===
When Christianity began to die out in Europe during the industrial revolution, so did the idea that Romani were behind Black Magic die out, and with the rise of racial science in the 19th Century, Roma were seen as an inferior race. During the Nazi Era, the Nazis did not view Roma and Sinti as secular embodiments of evil, akin to their perception of Jews, who were believed to possess the manipulation powers of both Capitalism and Bolshevism. They lacked any belief that Sinti or Roma could spiritually or physically taint them, or that any other so-called subhumans could do so. Nonetheless, Germans regarded Sinti and Roma as morally depraved, immoral, promiscuous, sexually depraved, criminal, and asocial individuals, representing a form of racial pollution that significantly harmed society.

Romani women were also raped by the Nazis. There was also prostitution in Romani concentration camps.

Robert Ritter believed Romani people were uncivilized, lazy nomads who don't work and are alien to German culture. The main reason why the Nazis hated Romani people because they believed Romani people didn't benefit German society.

Hitler also discriminated against Romani people for their dark, non-white features. Hitler promoted Nordic features on posters, billboards, and television, portraying blonde hair and blue eyes as the standard of beauty in Europe. Even though Romani people speak a Aryan language, Hitler ignored these facts and redefined the word Aryan to suit his own needs for Aryan supremacy.

The genocide is often referred to as the "Forgotten Holocaust". The German government refused to recognize the Nazi genocide against the Roma and Sinti until 1982. The Roma and Sinti also still have not received reparations or compensation from the German government.

Hitler's genocide of the Roma was influenced by the Native American genocide in the United States and the efficiency of the Armenian Genocide. He admired the idea of "Manifest Destiny," the American belief that white settlers were meant to expand across the continent. Hitler saw the American history of displacing and killing Native Americans as a model for Germany's pursuit of Lebensraum (living space) in Eastern Europe. In Mein Kampf, he praised the United States for denying citizenship based on race and for removing Native Americans to establish a racially "pure" white settler nation. Hitler drew inspiration from the United States westward expansion and the violence against Native Americans, viewing it as a precedent for his own plans to conquer and colonize Eastern Europe. California's history of genocide and eugenics of the Indigenous peoples of California during the California genocide influenced Hitler’s racist ideology.

=== Catholic Church takes responsibility ===
On 12 March 2000, Pope John Paul II issued a formal public apology to, among other groups of people affected by Catholic persecution, the Romani people and begged God for forgiveness. On 2 June 2019, Pope Francis acknowledged during a meeting with members of the Romanian Romani community the Catholic Church's history of promoting "discrimination, segregation and mistreatment" against Romani people throughout the world, apologized, and asked the Romani people for forgiveness.

== Contemporary antiziganism ==
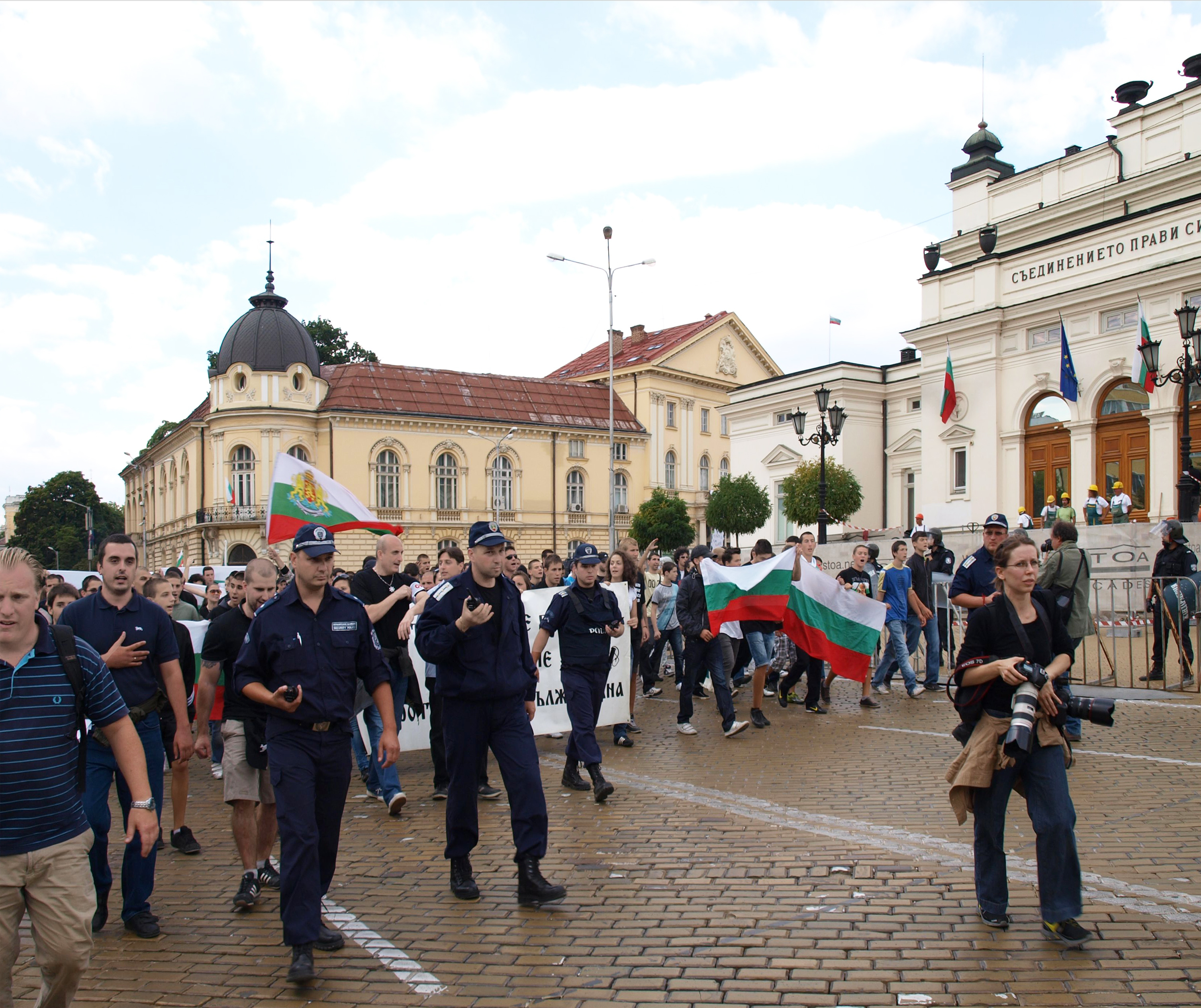
Anti-Roma protest in Sofia, Bulgaria, 2011

A 2011 report issued by Amnesty International states, "systematic discrimination is taking place against up to 10 million Roma across Europe. The organization has documented the failures of governments across the continent to live up to their obligations."

Antiziganism has continued well into the 2000s, particularly in Slovakia, Hungary, Slovenia, and Kosovo. In Bulgaria, Professor Ognian Saparev has written articles stating that 'Gypsies' are culturally inclined towards theft and use their minority status to 'blackmail' the majority. European Union officials censured both the Czech Republic and Slovakia in 2007 for forcibly segregating Romani children from regular schools.

The Council of Europe Commissioner for Human Rights, Thomas Hammarberg, has been an outspoken critic of antiziganism. In August 2008, Hammarberg noted that "today's rhetoric against the Roma is very similar to the one used by Nazi Germany before World War II. Once more, it is argued that the Roma are a threat to safety and public health. No distinction is made between a few criminals and the overwhelming majority of the Roma population. This is shameful and dangerous".

According to the latest Human Rights First Hate Crime Survey, Romanis routinely suffer assaults in city streets and other public places as they travel to and from homes and markets. In many serious cases of violence against them, attackers have also sought out whole families in their homes or whole communities in settlements predominantly housing Romanis. The widespread patterns of violence are sometimes directed both at causing immediate harm to Romanis, without distinction between adults, the elderly, and small children, and physically eradicating the presence of Romani people in towns and cities in several European countries.

Romani people are often victims of violence committed by white power skinheads, neo-Nazis and white supremacists.

=== Public opinion ===
The extent of negative attitudes towards Romani people varies across Europe.

Unfavorable views of Roma, 2019
Country	Percent
Italy	83%
Slovakia	76%
Greece	72%
Bulgaria	68%
Czech Republic	66%
Lithuania	61%
Hungary	61%
Ukraine	54%
Russia	52%
Poland	51%
France	44%
Spain	40%
Germany	37%

Eurobarometer 2019: % of people in each country who would feel comfortable if one of their children were in a love relationship with a Roma person.
Country	Percentage
United Kingdom	74%
Sweden	71%
Netherlands	69%
Spain	65%
France	57%
Ireland	57%
Finland	53%
Luxembourg	52%
Germany	51%
Denmark	48%
Poland	43%
Belgium	37%
Croatia	36%
Slovenia	36%
Austria	35%
Portugal	33%
Latvia	32%
Romania	31%
Estonia	29%
Slovakia	29%
Hungary	27%
Italy	26%
Malta	24%
Cyprus	23%
Czech Republic	23%
Lithuania	22%
Greece	21%
Bulgaria	14%

=== European Union ===
According to a survey conducted by the European Commission in 2015 20% of the respondents would be completely uncomfortable about working with a Roma person ( violet), compared with 17% with a transgender or transsexual person ( green) and 13% with a Muslim person ( orange).

The practice of placing Romani students in segregated schools or classes remains widespread in countries across Europe. Many Romani children have been channeled into all-Romani schools that offer inferior quality education and are sometimes in poor physical condition or into segregated all-Romani or predominantly Romani classes within mixed schools. Many Romani children are sent to classes for pupils with learning disabilities. They are also sent to so-called "delinquent schools", with a variety of human rights abuses.

Romani in European cities are often accused of crimes such as pickpocketing. In 2009, a documentary by the BBC called Gypsy Child Thieves showed Romani children being kidnapped and abused by Romani gangs from Romania. The children were often held locked in sheds at night and sent out to steal during the day. However, Chachipe, a charity which works for the human rights of Romani people, has claimed that this programme promoted "popular stereotypes against Roma which contribute to their marginalisation and provide legitimacy to racist attacks against them" and that in suggesting that begging and child exploitation was "intrinsic to the Romany culture", the programme was "highly damaging" for the Romani people. However, the charity accepted that some of the incidents detailed in the programme actually took place.

The documentary speculated that in Milan, Italy, a single Romani child was able to steal as much as €12,000 in a month, and that there were as many as 50 such abused Romani children operating in the city. The film went on to describe the link between poverty, discrimination, crime, and exploitation.

A United Nations study found that Romani people living in European countries are arrested for robbery much more often than other groups. Amnesty International and Romani rights groups such as the Union Romani blame widespread institutionalised racism and persecution. In July 2008, a Business Week feature found the region's Romani population to be a "missed economic opportunity". Hundreds of people from Ostravice, in the Beskydy mountains in the Czech Republic, signed a petition against a plan to move Romani families from Ostrava city to their home town, fearing the Romani as well as claiming their schools would not being able to cope with the influx of Romani children.

In 2009, the UN's anti-racism panel charged that "Gypsies suffer widespread racism in European Union". The EU has launched a program entitled Decade of Roma Inclusion to combat this and other problems.

==== Austria ====
On 5 February 1995, Franz Fuchs killed four Romani in Oberwart with a pipe bomb improvised explosive device which was attached to a sign that read "Roma zurück nach Indien" ("Romani back to India"). It was the worst racial terror attack in post-war Austria, and was Fuchs's first fatal attack.

==== Bulgaria ====
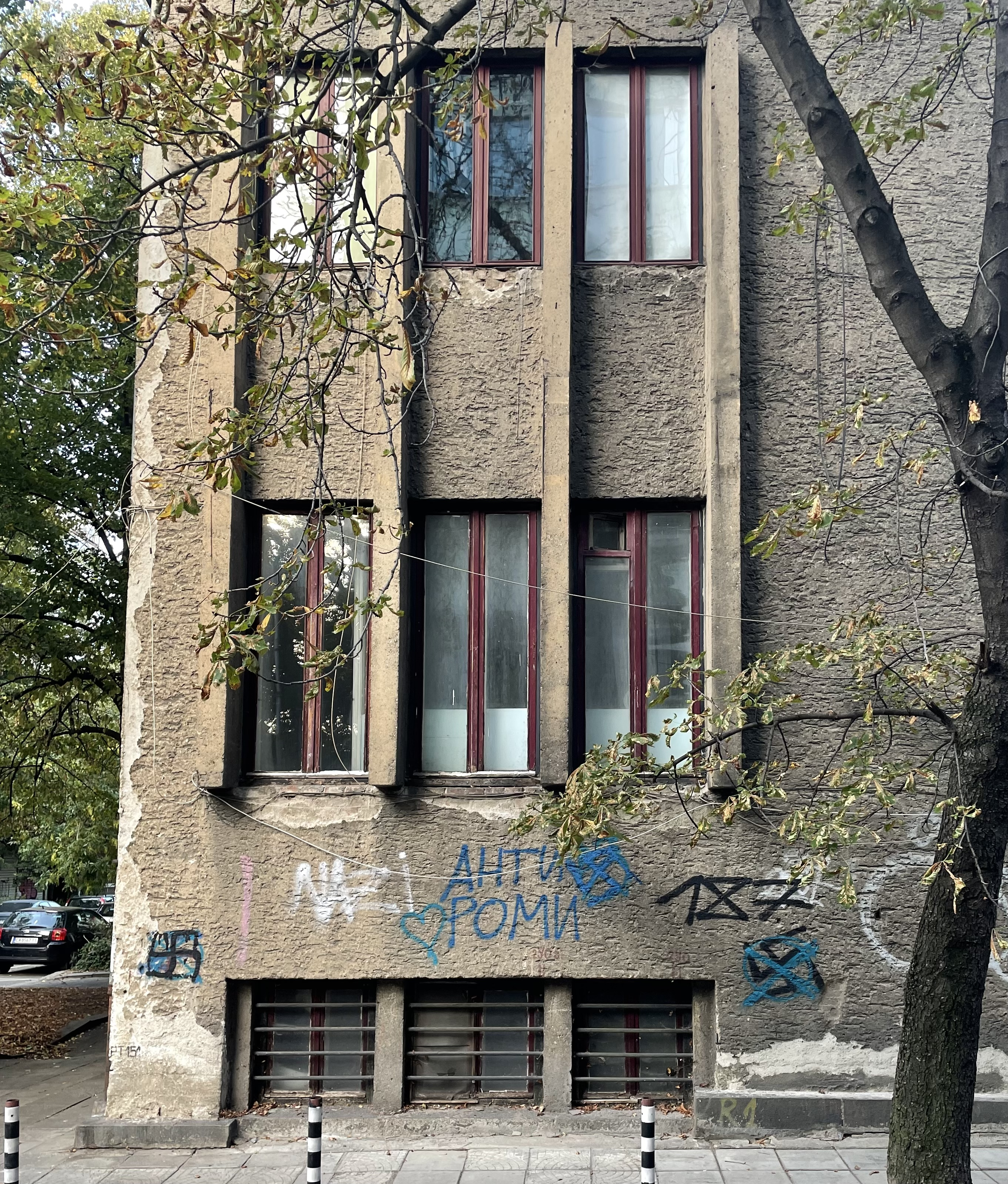
Anti-Roma graffiti in Sofia.

In 2011 in Bulgaria, widespread anti-Romanyism culminated in anti-Roma protests in response to the murder of Angel Petrov on the orders of Kiril Rashkov, a Roma leader in the village of Katunitsa. In the subsequent trial, the killer, Simeon Yosifov, was sentenced to 17 years in jail. As of May 2012, an appeal was underway. Hate speech directed at Romani people was perpetrated on Facebook.

Protests continued on 1 October in Sofia, with 2,000 Bulgarians marching against the Romani and what they viewed as the "impunity and the corruption" of the country's political elite.

Volen Siderov, leader of the far-right Ataka party and presidential candidate, spoke to a crowd at the Presidential Palace in Sofia, calling for the death penalty to be reinstated as well as Romani ghettos to be dismantled.

Many of the organized protests were accompanied by ethnic clashes and racist violence against the Romani. The protesters shouted racist slogans like "Gypsies into soap" and "Slaughter the Turks". Many protesters were arrested for public order offenses. The news media labelled the protests as anti-Romani Pogroms.

Furthermore, in 2009, Bulgarian prime minister Boyko Borisov referred to Roma as "bad human material". The vice-president of the Party of European Socialists, Jan Marinus Wiersma claimed that he "has already crossed the invisible line between right-wing populism and extremism".

In 2019, pogroms against the Roma community in Gabrovo broke out after three young Romani were accused of assaulting a local shopkeeper. A wave of riots ensued, leading to the majority of the towns Roma community fleeing over night, leaving behind their homes to be looted. The police had “shown frustration, urging more Gabrovo Roma to spend the next few days with relatives in other municipalities”. Many Roma have never returned as their homes were burned down and their property destroyed.

In 2016, a 24-year-old white Bulgarian man named Angel Kaleev brutally beat Mitko, a 17-year-old Romani teenager, in Ovchepoltsi for saying Roma are equal.

==== Czech Republic ====
Roma make up 2–3% of the population in the Czech Republic. According to Říčan (1998), Roma make up more than 60% of Czech prisoners, and about 20–30% earn their livelihood in illegal ways, such as procuring prostitution, trafficking, and other property crimes. Roma are thus more than 20 times overrepresented in Czech prisons than their population share would suggest.

Several Roma walls have been built by local authorities to segregate the Roma minority from the rest of the population. Such practices have been criticised by both human rights organizations and the European Union, who see it as a case of racial segregation. EU Commissioner Guenter Verheugen called instances of Roma walls being erected in the Czech Republic "a violation of human rights". The Czech government provided local authorities money for social welfare programmes for Romani, but much of the money was used for buying the houses of the non-Roma residents, thus creating a local Roma-only "ghetto".

According to a 2010 survey, 83% of Czechs regarded Roma as a maladjusted group unable to integrate into society, and 45% of Czechs wanted to expel them from the country. A 2011 poll, which followed after some brutal attacks by Romani perpetrators against the majority population victims, revealed that 44% of Czechs are afraid of Roma people. The majority of the Czech people that have a personal experience with Romani people, do not want to have Romanis as neighbours (almost 90%, more than any other group), seeing them as thieves and social parasites. Despite long waiting times for child adoption, Romani children from orphanages are rarely adopted by Czech couples. After the Velvet Revolution in 1989, the jobs traditionally employing Romanis either disappeared or were taken over by immigrant workers.

In January 2010, Amnesty International launched a report titled Injustice Renamed: Discrimination in Education of Roma persists in the Czech Republic. According to the BBC, it was Amnesty's view that while the authorities had introduced cosmetic changes, little genuine improvement in addressing discrimination against Romani children has occurred over recent years.

In 2013, numerous violent anti-Roma protests took place after 5 Roma attacked a young Czech couple in Duchcov.

A 2019 Pew Research poll found that 66% of Czechs held unfavorable views of Roma.

==== Denmark ====
In Denmark, there was considerable controversy when the city of Helsingør decided to place all Romani students in special classes in its public schools. The classes were later abandoned after it was determined that they were discriminatory, and the Romani children were admitted back into regular classes.

==== France ====
France has come under criticism for its treatment of Roma. In the summer of 2010, French authorities demolished at least 51 illegal Roma camps and began the process of repatriating their residents to their countries of origin. The French government has been accused of perpetrating these actions to pursue its political agenda. In July 2013, Jean-Marie Le Pen, a highly controversial far-right politician and founder of the National Front party, had a lawsuit filed against him by the European Roma and Travellers Forum, SOS Racisme and the French Union of Travellers Association after he publicly called France's Roma population "smelly" and "rash-inducing", claiming his comments violated French law on inciting racial hatred.

In France, anti-Romani sentiment (often referred to as anti-Gypsyism) is identified as a specific and persistent form of racism targeting Roma, Manouches, Sinti, Yéniches, and groups administratively classified as Gens du voyage. Based on long-term survey data from the CNCDH racism barometer, attitudes toward Roma are consistently the most negative among all minority groups measured. Levels of tolerance toward Roma are significantly lower than those toward Black people, Jews, Muslims, or people of North African origin, leading scholars to describe anti-Romani prejudice as “the last acceptable form of prejudice” in French society.

While hostility declined between 2014 and 2022, most indicators show a renewed increase since 2022. A substantial share of the population continues to endorse stereotypes portraying Roma as nomadic, unwilling to integrate, dependent on welfare, or associated with delinquency. However, acceptance of openly racist public statements has decreased over time. Anti-Romani attitudes are strongly correlated with broader ethnocentrism. They are socially structured: they are more prevalent among older age groups, individuals with lower levels of education, people experiencing economic insecurity, and respondents positioned on the right of the political spectrum. Regional variations are also observed, with higher hostility in eastern and Mediterranean regions.

Research emphasizes that these attitudes are shaped less by direct experience than by long-standing symbolic representations and political discourse. Increased public recognition of the genocide of Roma during the Second World War has improved awareness, but remains fragile and uneven, highlighting ongoing challenges in combating anti-Romani racism in France.

==== Germany ====
After 2005, Germany deported some 50,000 people, mainly Romani, to Kosovo. They were asylum seekers who fled the country during the Kosovo War. The people were deported after living in Germany for more than 10 years. The deportations were highly controversial, as many were children who had obtained an education in Germany, spoke German as their primary language, and considered themselves to be Germans. Three victims of the Hanau shootings were Romanis.

==== Hungary ====
On 23 February 2009, a Romani man and his five-year-old son were shot dead in Tatárszentgyörgy village southeast of Budapest as they were fleeing their burning house, which was set alight by a petrol bomb. The dead man's two other children suffered serious burns. Suspects were arrested and were on trial as of 2011.

In 2012, Viktória Mohácsi, 2004–2009 Hungarian Member of European Parliament of Romani ethnicity, asked for asylum in Canada after previously requesting police protection at home from serious threats she was receiving from hate groups.

==== Italy ====
In 2007 and 2008, following the rape and subsequent murder of a woman in Rome at the hands of a young man from a local Romani encampment, the Italian government started a crackdown on illegal Roma and Sinti campsites in the country.

In May 2008, Romani camps in Naples were attacked and set on fire by local residents. In July 2008, a high court in Italy overthrew the conviction of defendants who had publicly demanded the expulsion of Romanis from Verona in 2001 and reportedly ruled that "it is acceptable to discriminate against Roma on the grounds that they are thieves". One of those freed was Flavio Tosi, Verona's mayor and an official of the anti-immigrant political party Lega Nord. The decision came during a "nationwide clampdown" on Romanis by Italian prime minister Silvio Berlusconi. The previous week, Berlusconi's interior minister Roberto Maroni had declared that all Romanis in Italy, including children, would be fingerprinted.

In 2011, the development of a National Inclusion Strategy for Rom, Sinti and Camminanti under the supervision of the European Commission has defined the presence of Romani camps as an unacceptable condition. As already underlined by many international organizations, the prevalent positioning of the RSC communities in the c.d "nomad camps" fuels segregation and hinders every process of social integration/inclusion; but even where other, more stable housing modalities have been found, forms of ghettoization and self-segregation are found, which hinder the process of integration / social inclusion.

==== Romania ====
Roma make up 3.3% of Romania's population. Prejudice against Romanis is common amongst the Romanians, who characterize them as thieves, dirty, and lazy. A 2000 EU report about Romani said that in Romania... the continued high levels of discrimination are a serious concern...and progress has been limited to programmes aimed at improving access to education. A survey of the Pro Democrația association in Romania revealed that 94% of the questioned persons believe that the Romanian citizenship should be revoked to ethnic Romani who commit crimes abroad.

In 2009-2010, a media campaign followed by a parliamentarian initiative asked the Romanian Parliament to accept a proposal to change back the official name of country's Roma (adopted in 2000) to Țigan, the traditional and colloquial Romanian name for Romani, to avoid the possible confusion among the international community between the words Roma, which refers to the Romani ethnic minority, and Romania. The Romanian government supported the move, arguing that many countries in the European Union use a variation of the word Țigan to refer to their Roma populations. The Romanian upper house, the Senate, rejected the proposal.

Several anti-Romani riots occurred in recent decades, notably the 1993 Hădăreni riots, in which a mob of Romanians and Hungarians, in response to the killing of a Romanian by a Romani person, burnt down 13 houses belonging to Roma, lynched three Romani people, and forced 130 people to flee the village.

In Baia Mare, Mayor Cătălin Cherecheș announced the building of a 3 metre high, 100 metre long concrete wall to divide the buildings in which the Roma community lives from the rest of the city and bring "order and discipline" into the area.

The manele, their modern music style, was prohibited in some cities of Romania in public transport and taxis, that action being justified by bus and taxi companies as being for passengers' comfort and a neutral ambience, acceptable for all passengers. However, those actions had been characterised by Speranța Rădulescu, a professor of ethno-musicology at the Bucharest Conservatory, as "a defect of Romanian society". There were also a few criticisms of Professor Dr. Ioan Bradu Iamandescu's experimental study, which linked the listening of "manele" to an increased level of aggressiveness and low self-control and suggested a correlation between preference for that music style and low cognitive skills.

In 2009, American pop singer Madonna was booed for defending the Roma community at her concert in Romania.

Babasha, a Romanian Romani manele singer, faced boos during a Coldplay concert in Bucharest and encountered racism at the Arena Națională venue due to his Romani heritage.

==== Sweden ====
Roma are one of the five official national minorities in Sweden.

In 1922, the first proposal on compulsory sterilisation in Sweden was made. Beginning in 1934, compulsory sterilisation of the "mentally retarded" was legally practiced by the Swedish state. Sterilisations were mostly conducted on disabled people, but also minority groups, such as the Roma. 30,000 people were sterilised against their will. It is not known exactly how many Roma people were sterilised, but it is estimated to be at least 400-500 people. The policy was based on "racial science" supported by the State Institute for Racial Biology in Uppsala. In 1937, a "maternal care" policy was introduced for people of Roma heritage. It was used to convince Roma mothers to get sterilised. An excerpt from a childcare inspector's application of sterilisation on a woman in the mid 1940s: "The applicant - including the man - are of Romani heritage and still live a wandering life. [...] It can not be seen as desirable that additional children are brought into this home. [...] Maternal care for the last born child has been granted only on condition that the sterilisation operation is undertaken." The law on compulsory sterilisation was abolished in 1976.

In 2013, it was revealed that the Skåne Police held an illegal registry of over 4,000 Roma people, including children. It included many Roma people who had no criminal record. The registry was located in a folder in the Skåne Police's database, marked "itinerants". It was established by the Police in Lund but was also sought after by other criminal agencies in other cities.

In a 2002/2003 survey commissioned by the Equality Ombudsman, Roma described the discrimination they experience in their daily lives. 90 percent stated that they perceive Sweden to a certain or high degree as a racist country. The same amount agreed to a certain or high degree with the statement that the country has a negative view towards Roma. 25 percent neither feel a part of the Swedish population nor feel accepted in the Swedish society, and 60 percent said that they have been called derogatory or discriminatory terms related to their ethnic background at least once in the last two years.

==== Slovakia ====
According to the 2011 census, Roma make up 2.0% of Slovakia's population.

Three Slovak Romani women have come before the European Court of Human Rights on grounds of having been sterilised without their consent in Slovak hospitals. The sterilisations were performed by tubal ligation after the women gave birth by Caesarean section. The court awarded two of the women costs and damages, while the third case was dismissed because of the woman's death. A report by the Center for Reproductive Rights and the Centre for Civil and Human Rights has compiled more than 100 cases of Roma women in Slovakia who have been sterilised without their informed consent.

Roma are the victims of discrimination in Slovakia. According to monitoring and reports provided by the European Roma Rights Center (ERRC) in 2013, racist violence, evictions, threats, and more subtle forms of discrimination have increased over the past two years in Slovakia. The ERRC considers the situation in Slovakia to be one of the worst in Europe, as of 2013.

Roma people suffer serious discrimination in Slovakia, and are victims of ethnically driven violence and crime. Roma children are segregated in school and do not receive the same level of education as other Slovak children. Some are sent to schools for children with mild mental disabilities. As a result, their attainment level is far below average. Amnesty International's report "Unfulfilled promises: Failing to end segregation of Roma pupils in Slovakia" describes the failure of the Slovak authorities to end the discrimination of Roma children on the grounds of their ethnicity in education. According to a 2012 United Nations Development Programme survey, around 43 per cent of Roma in mainstream schools attended ethnically segregated classes.

The 2019 Pew Research poll found that 76% of Slovaks held unfavorable views of Roma.

=== Non-EU countries ===
==== Albania ====
Roma and Ashkali and Balkan Egyptians suffer from various forms of discrimination in Albania.

==== Canada ====
When Romani refugees were allowed into Canada in 1997, a protest was staged by 25 people, including neo-Nazis, in front of the motel where the refugees were staying. The protesters held signs that included, "Honk if you hate Gypsies", "Canada is not a Trash Can", and "G.S.T. – Gypsies Suck Tax". (The last is a reference to Canada's unpopular Goods and Services Tax, also known as GST.) The protesters were charged with promoting hatred, and the case, called R. v. Krymowski, reached the Supreme Court of Canada in 2005.

On 5 September 2012, prominent Canadian conservative commentator Ezra Levant broadcast a commentary "The Jew vs. the Gypsies" on J-Source in which he accused the Romani people of being a group of criminals: "These are gypsies, a culture synonymous with swindlers. The phrase gypsy and cheater have been so interchangeable historically that the word has entered the English language as a verb: he gypped me. Well the gypsies have gypped us. Too many have come here as false refugees. And they come here to gyp us again and rob us blind as they have done in Europe for centuries.... They're gypsies. And one of the central characteristics of that culture is that their chief economy is theft and begging."

==== Egypt ====
In Egypt, the Ghagar (a term used for Dom people, often translated as “gypsies”) have long been the subject of public discrimination, cultural stigma, and negative media portrayal. While there are no formal refugee protests, the social exclusion of the Ghagar in Egypt is deeply rooted in popular culture and reinforced by state and private media.

In urban neighborhoods like Ain Shams and Ezbet el-Nakhl, communities that identify or are identified as Ghagar have reported facing harassment, restricted employment opportunities, and police suspicion.

==== Kosovo ====
From the end of the Kosovo War in June 1999, about 80% of Kosovo's Romanis were expelled, amounting to approximately 100,000 expellees. For the 1999–2006 period, the European Roma Rights Centre documented numerous crimes perpetrated by Kosovo's ethnic Albanians with the purpose to expel the region of its Romani population, along with other various non-Albanian communities, as they were considered to be allied with Serbian national interests.

These crimes included murder, abduction and illegal detention, torture, arson, confiscation of houses and other property, and forced labour. Whole Romani neighbourhoods were burned to the ground after being expelled by Albanians. Romani people are routinely intimidated, verbally harassed and periodically attacked on ethnic and racist grounds by Albanians. The Romani community of Kosovo is regarded to be, for the most part, expelled and in exile.

At UN internally displaced persons' camps in Kosovska Mitrovica for Romanis, the refugees were exposed to lead poisoning.

==== Norway ====
In Norway, Romani, in common with other marginalised groups, were sterilised by the state, a practice which continued until 1977. In the period 1934-1977, a total of 125 sterilisations were performed on Romani people in Norway, accounting for 0.00288% of the total number of documented sterilisations.

Anti-Romanyism in Norway flared up in July 2012, when roughly 200 Romani people settled outside Sofienberg church in Oslo and were later relocated to a building site at Årvoll, in northern Oslo. The group was subjected to hate crimes in the form of stone throwing and fireworks being aimed at and fired into their camp. They, and Norwegians trying to assist them in their situation, also received death threats. Siv Jensen, the leader of the right-wing Progress Party, also advocated the expulsion of the Romani people resident in Oslo.

==== Serbia ====
The Serbian Roma community in Serbia experiences significantly higher levels of unemployment, poverty, and discrimination compared to others.

==== Switzerland ====
A Swiss right-wing magazine, Weltwoche, published a photograph of a gun-wielding Roma child on its cover in 2012, with the title "The Roma are coming: Plundering in Switzerland". They claimed in a series of articles of a growing trend in the country of "criminal tourism for which eastern European Roma clans are responsible", with professional gangs specializing in burglary, thefts, organized begging and street prostitution. The magazine immediately came under criticism for its links to the right-wing populist People's Party (SVP), as being deliberately provocative and encouraged racist stereotyping by linking ethnic origin and criminality. Switzerland's Federal Commission against Racism is considering legal action after complaints in Switzerland, Austria, and Germany that the cover breached antiracism laws.

The Berlin newspaper Tagesspiegel investigated the origins of the photograph taken in the slums of Gjakova, Kosovo, where Roma communities were displaced during the Kosovo War to hovels built on a toxic landfill. The Italian photographer, Livio Mancini, denounced the abuse of his photograph, which was originally taken to demonstrate the plight of Roma families in Europe.

==== Turkey ====
Romani people in Turkey have many problems in everyday life, e.g., in jobs and professions. In May 2021, there was also a report of the mysterious death of a young Turkish Roma soldier from East Thrace, who served his military service in Itlib. Romani people have also faced exclusion from coronavirus aid in 2020 and from earthquake aid in 2023, and have been expelled from places they have lived in for centuries, such as Sulukule in 2007 and Bayramiç in 1970. Due to this discrimination, many deny their Romani origins as much as possible and pretend to be Turks.

==== United Kingdom ====
According to the LGBT rights organisation and charity Stonewall, anti-Romanyism exists in the UK, with a distinction made between Romani people and Irish Travellers (both of whom are commonly known by the exonym "gypsies" in the UK), and the so-called "travellers [and] modern Gypsies". In 2008, the British media reported that Roma & Travellers experience a higher degree of discrimination than any other ethnic group in the UK, including asylum-seekers. A Mori poll showed that a third of respondents admitted to being prejudiced against Roma & Travellers.

Thousands of retrospective planning permissions are granted in Britain each year in cases involving non-Romani applicants. Statistics showed that 90% of planning applications by Romanis and Irish Travellers are initially refused by local councils compared with a national average of 20% for other applicants. Some travellers have argued that the root of the problem was that many traditional stopping places had been barricaded off and that legislation passed by the previous Conservative governments had effectively criminalised their community. For example, some travellers have claimed that removing local authorities' responsibility to provide sites for travellers leaves them with no option but to purchase unregistered new sites themselves.

===== England =====
In 2002 Conservative Party politician, and MP for Bracknell Andrew MacKay stated in a House of Commons debate on unauthorised encampments of Roma and other Travelling groups in the UK, "They [Roma and Travellers] are scum, and I use the word advisedly. People who do what these people have done do not deserve the same human rights as my decent constituents going about their ordinary lives".

In 2005, Doncaster Borough Council discussed in chamber a Review of Gypsy and Traveller Needs and concluded that "Gypsies" and Irish Travellers are among the most vulnerable and marginalised ethnic minority groups in Britain.

A Roma and Traveller support centre in Leeds, West Yorkshire, was set on fire during an arson attack in April 2011 in what the police suspect was a hate crime. The fire caused substantial damage to a centre that is used as a base for the support and education of Roma and travellers in the community.

===== Scotland =====
The Equal Opportunities Committee of the Scottish parliament in 2001 and in 2009 confirmed that widespread marginalisation and discrimination persists in Scottish society against Roma and traveller groups. A 2009 survey conducted by the Scottish Government also concludes that Scottish Roma and travellers had been largely ignored in official policies. A similar survey in 2006 found discriminatory attitudes in Scotland towards Roma and travellers, and showed 37 percent of those questioned would be unhappy if a relative married a Roma person or traveller while 48 percent found it unacceptable if a member of the Roma or traveller minorities became primary school teachers.

A report by the University of the West of Scotland found that both Scottish and UK governments had failed to safeguard the rights of the Roma as a recognized ethnic group and did not raise awareness of Roma rights within the UK. Additionally, an Amnesty International report published in 2012 stated that Traveller groups in Scotland routinely suffer widespread discrimination in society, as well as a disproportionate level of scrutiny in the media. Over a four-month period as a sample 48 per cent of articles showed Roma & Travellers in a negative light, while 25–28 per cent of articles were favourable, or of a neutral viewpoint. Amnesty recommended journalists adhere to ethical codes of conduct when reporting on Roma & Traveller populations in Scotland, as they face fundamental human rights concerns, particularly with regard to health, education, housing, family life and culture.

To tackle the widespread prejudices and needs of Roma/Traveller minorities, in 2011, the Scottish Government set up a working party to consider how best to improve community relations between Roma/Travellers and Scottish society. Including young Roma/Travellers to engage in an online positive messages campaign, containing factually correct information on their communities.

===== Wales =====
In 2007, a study by the newly formed Equality and Human Rights Commission found that negative attitudes and prejudice persist against Roma/Traveller communities in Wales. Results showed that 38 percent of those questioned would not accept a long-term relationship with, or would be unhappy if a close relative married or formed a relationship with, a Roma or other Traveller. Furthermore, only 37 percent found it acceptable if a member of the Roma or other Traveller minorities became a primary school teacher, the lowest score of any group. An advertising campaign to tackle prejudice in Wales was launched by the Equality and Human Rights Commission (EHRC) in 2008.

===== Northern Ireland =====
In June 2009, having had their windows broken and death threats made against them, twenty Romanian Romani families were forced from their homes in Lisburn Road, Belfast, in Northern Ireland. Up to 115 people, including women and children, were forced to seek refuge in a local church hall after being attacked. The authorities later moved them to a safer location. An anti-racist rally in the city on 15 June to support Romani rights was attacked by youths chanting neo-Nazi slogans. The attacks were condemned by Amnesty International and political leaders from both the Unionist and Nationalist traditions in Northern Ireland.

Following the arrest of three local youths in relation to the attacks, the church where the Romanis had been given shelter was badly vandalised. Using 'emergency funds', Northern Ireland authorities assisted most of the victims to return to Romania.

In June 2025, the 2025 Northern Ireland riots took place after two Romani teenagers were charged with sexual assault in Ballymena. Anti-Romani sentiment was perceived as a driving factor by local immigrants to the extent that some sought to dissuade anti-Romani rioters by placing messages saying "Filipino lives here" in their windows.

==== United States ====
Pennsylvania, Indiana, Georgia, and New Jersey have all passed anti-Romani discriminatory laws. Police forces across the US have established task forces focusing on "gypsy crime". Per a 2020 study, out of the Romani people interviewed, respondents identifying as Romanichal, Kalderash, or Machvaya were most likely to report being racially profiled by the police.

In 2022, the United States Senate Committee on Foreign Relations passed a resolution officially acknowledging the Romani Holocaust and the history and culture of Romani people in the United States.

===== Elsie Paroubek Affair (1911) =====
In Chicago in 1911, the highly publicised disappearance of the five-year-old Elsie Paroubek was immediately blamed on "Gypsy child kidnappers". The public was alerted to reports that "Gypsies were seen with a little girl", and many such reports were made. Police raided a "Gypsy" encampment near 18th and South Halstead in Chicago and later expanded the searches and raids to encampments throughout the state of Illinois, to locations as widespread as Round Lake, McHenry, Volo and Cherry Valley – but they found no trace of the missing girl. The police attributed her capture to "the natural love of the wandering people for blue-eyed, yellow-haired children".

===== Present situation =====
While some scholars argue that appropriation of the Roma identity in the United States is based on misconceptions and ignorance rather than anti-Romanyism, Romani advocacy groups decry the practice.

== Environmental struggles ==
Environmental issues that were caused by Cold War-era industrial development have disproportionately impacted the Roma, particularly those Roma who live in Eastern Europe. Most often, the traditional nomadic lifestyle of the Roma causes them to settle on the outskirts of towns and cities, where amenities, employment, and educational opportunities are often inaccessible. As of 1993, Hungary has been identified as one country where this issue exists: "While the economic restructuring of a command economy into a western-style market economy created hardships for most Hungarians, with the national unemployment rate heading toward 14 percent and per capita real income falling, the burdens which are imposed on Romanis are disproportionately great."

Panel buildings (panelák) in the Chanov ghetto near Most, Czech Republic, were built in the 1970s for a high-income clientele. The authorities introduced a model plan whereby Roma were relocated from poorer areas to these buildings to live among Czech neighbors. However, with the rising proportion of Roma moving in, the Czech clients gradually moved out in a kind of white flight, eventually leaving a district in which the vast majority of residents were Roma. A poll in 2007 marked the district as the worst place in the Ústí nad Labem Region. Buildings were eventually stripped of any valuable materials and torn down. The removal of materials was blamed on the Roma who had last inhabited the building. Despite a total rental debt in excess of €3.5 million, all of the tenants in the remaining buildings continue to be provided with water and electricity, unlike the situation in many other European countries.

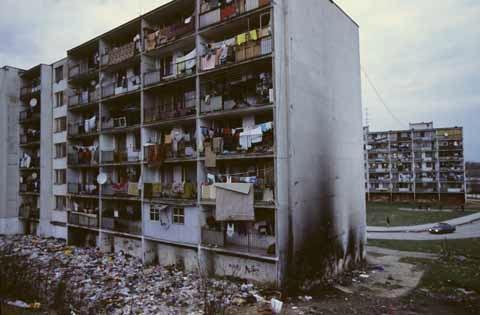
Roma slum Luník IX near Košice, Slovakia

When newly built in the 1980s, some flats in this settlement were assigned to Roma who had relocated from poverty-stricken locations in a government effort to integrate the Roma population. Other flats were assigned to families of military and law-enforcement personnel. Nevertheless, the military and police families gradually moved out of the residences, and the living conditions for the Roma population deteriorated. Ongoing failures to pay bills led to the disconnection of the water supply, and an emergency plan was eventually created to provide running water for two hours per day to mitigate the bill payment issue. Similarly to Chanov, some of these buildings were stripped of their materials and were eventually torn down; again, the Roma residents were identified as the culprits who were to blame for the theft of the materials.

The various legal hindrances to their traditional nomadic lifestyle have forced many travelling Roma to move into unsafe areas, such as ex-industrial sites, former landfills, or other waste sites where pollutants have contaminated rivers, streams, or groundwater. Consequently, Roma are often unable to access clean water or sanitation facilities, rendering the Roma people more vulnerable to health problems, such as diseases. Based in Belgium, the Health & Environment Alliance has included a statement about the Roma on one of its pamphlets: "Denied environmental benefits such as water, sewage treatment facilities, sanitation, and access to natural resources, and suffer from exposure to environmental hazards due to their proximity to hazardous waste sites, incinerators, factories, and other sources of pollution." Since the fall of communism and the privatisation of the formerly state owned water-supply companies in many areas of central and eastern Europe, the provision of decent running water to illegal buildings which Roma often occupied became a particularly sensitive issue, because the new international owners of the water-supply companies are unwilling to make contracts with the Roma population and as a result, "water-borne diseases, such as diarrhoea and dysentery" became "an almost constant feature of daily life, especially for children".

== Implications of anti-Romani discrimination ==
The oppression against the Romani people has physical implications, and many have been permanently scarred and even killed. For instance, one major problem in current times is that many Romani women have been forced to be sterilized, which could be considered a blatant attempt to stomp out the Romani race from continuing. This violence is not a localized issue, for according to William Shankly of Ethnicity and Race in the UK: State of the Nation, violence against the Romani people is widespread, even as far as Britain.

The oppression against the Roma people also has social implications. For instance, the prime minister of Hungary, Viktor Orbán, sided against the Roma minority in social issues, slandering the people publicly. As Andrew Ryder states, "The 'Gyöngyöspata case' marked the moment when the Prime Minister turned his fire from migrants onto Roma. Orbán's assertion that 'the people's sense of justice has been wounded', and that 'we need to give justice to the Gyöngyöspata people', excludes the Roma from the body of 'the people'. This message was not lost on the thousands of Roma who turned out to protest against the proposed national consultation." The Prime Minister publicly slandered the Roma people, leading to rebuttals from the Roma people. “Because of the discrimination, it is difficult for the Roma people to have a social identity.”

Anti-Roma discrimination has caused depression, anxiety, psychosis, paranoia, and eating disorders in Roma; Romani people are discriminated against in the job market; poor housing conditions and discrimination within the housing market significantly contribute to the exclusion of the Romani community; Romani people are discriminated in healthcare; the workshy stereotype has limited opportunities for non-Roma to engage with Romani people.

=== Police brutality ===
The European Roma Rights Centre (ERRC) has extensively documented and taken legal action on numerous cases involving suspicious deaths of Roma individuals at the hands of law enforcement. These incidents have sparked significant international outrage and demands for justice. They include Henri Lenfant's death in France, the viral video-recorded death of Stanislav Tomáš in the Czech Republic, and Nikos Sabanis' fatal shooting in Greece. Other cases, such as the death of Muszunye Mircea Vișan in a Romanian police station after being beaten until he suffered cardiac arrest, and the suspicious death of 27-year-old Jani Rustemaj while in police custody in Albania, have also drawn attention to the ERRC's efforts to address systemic injustice.

== Prevention ==
Council of Europe suggests that Europeans integrate the Roma to prevent racism.

George Soros and Nicolae Gheorghe have aided Roma.

Amnesty International campaigns against anti-Romani racism.

The European Commission actively works to combat anti-Romani racism. The President of the European Commission, Ursula von der Leyen, had called on member states to end discrimination against Roma in 2020.

Roma Resistance Day is a Romani holiday observed every May 16 to commemorate the 1944 uprising of Romani prisoners at the Auschwitz-Birkenau concentration camp against their Nazi oppressors. This day pays tribute to the Roma's struggle for survival and dignity during the Holocaust.

Romani people have used music such as flamenco to fight racism and stigma and as a way to earn money.

== In popular culture ==
In the media, Romani people, especially Romani women, are stereotyped to have magical powers. Films such as King of the Gypsies, Time of the Gypsies, and Alex & the Gypsy validated and reinforced negative stereotypes about Romani women. Cher's song "Gypsys, Tramps & Thieves." has reinforced negative stereotypes about Romani women. The media often portrays Romani women through a lens of stereotypes that suggest they possess mystical abilities, exhibit animalistic sexuality, and are promiscuous. Additionally, they are depicted as engaging in prostitution, characterized by a dual nature of being both "hot-blooded" and "cold-blooded." Furthermore, these portrayals include accusations of child abduction and violent behavior. In literature, Romani women are portrayed as promiscuous and challenging. The media also depicts Romani people as conniving, hypersexual, dangerous, and criminal. Romani men are stereotyped to be exotic seducers. In literary works, the fear that non-Roma individuals have towards the Roma community is frequently linked to the perceived virility and unrestrained sexuality of the latter. Consequently, a prevalent narrative depicts the Romani man as one who seduces, corrupts, or abducts innocent or virginal wives, sisters, and daughters. Romanian artists viewed Roma as possibly hypersexual. The attractiveness of the Romani flower girl has motivated numerous Romanian painters and writers, with its charm stemming from the alleged hypersexuality attributed to Romani individuals. This stereotype is widely recognized concerning marginalized communities. They are often linked to nature and perceived as more vigorous or sexually available than the white population. The same applies to African Americans. In the French opera Carmen by Georges Bizet, a Romani women is portrayed as a hypersexual woman that seduces white men and uses her sexuality to gain favors and attain impunity. Spanish artist Isidre Nonell had presented European art viewers in the nineteenth century with many images of Romani women portrayed wearing headscarves with darkened, dirty and racialized features. This type of stereotyping in the media contributes to the justification of anti-Roma discrimination and harassment, and media commentators seldom question it. In 2021, British comedian Jimmy Carr made an offensive Holocaust joke about Roma in his Netflix comedy special. The media presents two main stereotypes of Roma women: one as a dirty beggar exploiting welfare, and the other Roma woman as a hypersexualized, magical figure who challenges the white patriarchy. Although the term “gypsy” may seem harmless, it poses risks for Romani women. It evokes a romanticized image of poverty and sexualization, ignoring the harsh reality of institutionalized racism they face. There is nothing romantic about the connection between perceived uncontrollable sexuality and forced sterilization. Romani women are frequently described as having a "savage beauty," often depicted as promiscuous, seductive, or passionate in a way that implies a dangerous lack of self-control, as seen in the Carmen stereotype. They are also exoticized and stereotyped as sexually available to white men, promiscuous, and dangerous, often portrayed as mysterious, dark-haired "temptresses" or fortune tellers.

In much of the 19th-century art, music, and literature, Romani females were often portrayed and stereotyped as free-spirited, strong, rebellious, demanding, sexually provocative, captivating, and indifferent. Balkan Roma have been professional musicians for centuries, performing for peasants and city dwellers across social classes and ethnic backgrounds in cafes and at family gatherings. Yet, they have been excluded from prestigious concert venues. Despite their musical talent, Romani people face social rejection; they are admired as musicians but despised as individuals. This mix of positive and negative traits was frequently expressed in gendered terms: the "barbaric" Romani man, often depicted as a drug dealer, and the sexualized Romani woman. Similarly, in the stereotypical appreciation of "Gypsy" music, the male musician is seen as wild, while the female singer or dancer is viewed as sensual. Early films about the Romani people reinforced these old stereotypes, especially focusing on the sexuality of women, leading to the "Sexy Gypsy Stereotype." These films often reflect the ideological and symbolic chaos that the Roma are perceived to embody. The Roma are portrayed either positively or negatively, with their differences from non-Roma exaggerated or imagined—for instance, the belief that Roma are closer to nature, more sensual, wild, and free. Even these portrayals rarely show truly individual perspectives; instead, they fit neatly into the stereotype of the "rhapsodic Roma." When Roma are depicted as distant, almost mythical figures, they become suddenly attractive: handsome, artistic, living unrestrained lives, and symbolizing freedom. The favorable but dangerous and risky portrayal of Roma otherness relies on how non-Roma idealize them as free-spirited individuals, link them to artistic pursuits—particularly music—and connect them with nature and sexuality. Halloween costumes frequently depict Romani people as fortune tellers, seductive, sexy tricksters and pirates, which mocks Romani culture and reinforces numerous racial stereotypes. Such costumes portray Roma in a negative light, dehumanize them, and stereotype them as spell casters. Romani men are stereotyped to be licentious, lecherous, sexually immoral and abusive while Romani women are stereotyped to be promiscuous witches.

- In the 2006 mockumentary Borat, Sacha Baron Cohen's character explains that his hometown has "a tall fence for keeping out Gypsies and Jews"; the scene featuring this town was filmed in Glod, Dâmbovița, a Roma village in central Romania. He makes many more anti-Romani statements throughout the film.
- Many instances of Anti-Romanyism are described in Kristian Novak's 2016 novel Ziganin but the most beautiful.

== See also ==
- History of the Romani people
- Itinerant groups in Europe
- Legality of fortune-telling
- Racism in Europe
- Romani diaspora
- The Blond Angel Case
- Romani Holocaust
- Anti-Indian sentiment – Prejudice against Indian people
  - Pajeet – Ethnic slur directed at Indians
  - Persecution of Dalits
- White supremacy
  - Nazism
    - Nazi eugenics
    - Nazi racial theories
      - Racial policy of Nazi Germany
      - Consequences of Nazism
      - Romani Holocaust
      - Victims of Nazi Germany
      - Neo-Nazism
- Anti-Irish sentiment#Discrimination against Irish Travellers
