= Death of Stanislav Tomáš =

2021 police brutality case in the Czech Republic

On 19 June 2021, Stanislav Tomáš, a Romani man in Teplice, Czech Republic, died after several police officers pinned him to the ground and knelt on his neck for several minutes. The death was filmed and the video went viral, leading to comparisons with the murder of George Floyd in the United States and led to protests against antiziganism. In July 2026 the European Court of Human Rights ruled that the officers actions had violated Tomáš' right to life and constituted inhumane treatment. The Court also ruled that the authorities failure to effectively investigate Tomáš' death had likewise violated the aforementioned rights and constituted discrimination.

== Background ==
Romani people (Czech: Romové) are an ethnic minority in the Czech Republic, currently making up 2–3% of the population. Since the creation of Czechoslovakia in 1918, the Romani population have experienced considerable hardship, having been a main target of Nazi extermination programs during World War II, and the subject of forced relocation, the building of Roma walls to enforce segregation, and other discriminatory social policies during the Communist era. Romani people continue to be targeted by far-right groups in the Czech Republic, which spread anti-Romanyism. Among highly publicized cases was the Vítkov arson attack of 2009. A 2010 survey found that 83% of Czechs consider Roma asocial and 45% of Czechs would like to expel them from the Czech Republic, and a 2019 Pew Research poll found that 66% of Czechs held unfavorable views of Roma.

== Death ==
On 19 June 2021, Tomáš, a 46-year-old Romani man, was arrested by Czech police in Teplice. Multiple eyewitnesses stated that he was arrested while attempting to prevent the vandalism of a car. Video footage of the arrest that was captured by witnesses showed several police officers pinning him to the ground and kneeling on his neck and back. During the arrest, Tomáš cried out repeatedly in distress and several onlookers attempted to warn the police that he could not breathe. Tomáš died shortly afterwards in an ambulance. One of the officers had worn a body camera, however did not activate it at any point.

Police denied any involvement in the death. An official police statement claimed that a court-ordered autopsy had found no connection between Tomáš' death and the actions of the police and that he had instead died of an amphetamine overdose. The Czech police later posted a video on Twitter titled "No Czech Floyd" showing an unidentified half-naked man fighting with another next to a car.

On 30 June 2021, Tomáš' family announced that they would be filing a criminal complaint against Czech police with the European Roma Rights Centre (ERRC). ERRC president Đorđe Jovanović stated that "police harassment, ethnic profiling, brutality, torture, and sometimes even death is the experience for many Roma in Europe when they interact with law enforcement."

After the forensic autopsy and expert opinion, it was announced that the man died of heart failure, which was allegedly not related to the police officer kneeling on his neck in an identical maneuvre to that which killed George Floyd, but rather it was related to his usage of illegal substances that affected not only his heart but also his blood vessels.

On 13 December 2021, the Deputy Ombudsperson (Public Defender of Rights), Monika Šimůnková, published a report which found that the police officers had made at least three significant errors in the arrest of Stanislav Tomáš. For example, the police account stated that Tomáš "rose from the ground on his own, although he was sluggish." However, Šimůnková's report quotes a paramedic's testimony:

(The patient's) hands were cuffed behind his back. The officers were pinning him to the ground just by one arm so that he wouldn't run away. When I approached the patient, I ascertained that he was lying on his abdomen, making no noise, and I checked his carotid artery, but no pulse could be felt. At that moment the patient's circulatory system had stopped, i.e., he was not breathing. Subsequently I insisted he immediately be placed on a stretcher and put into the ambulance.

== Reactions ==
Jan Hamáček, the Czech Minister of the Interior, stated that the police had his full support and that "anybody under the influence of addictive substances who breaks the law has to count on the police intervening." His statement was made in the immediate aftermath of the death and long before the results of the autopsy had been released.

The Council of Europe called for "an urgent, thorough, and independent investigation" into the death. Amnesty International also called for an investigation into the death, stating that kneeling on the neck as a form of restraint was "reckless, unnecessary and disproportionate, and therefore unlawful" and that the Czech government's statements defending the police "can only be understood as giving carte blanche for law enforcement officials to resort to unnecessary or excessive use of force when handling with any person under the influence of drugs, providing a dangerous sense of impunity and being above the law." The Czech Government Council for Romani Minority Affairs stated that "the obvious similarity between this case and the death of the African-American George Floyd after a police intervention in the USA in June 2020 using very similar techniques raises a subject of basic interest to all of society about whether police are using force proportionately during their interventions."

Sebijan Fejzula of the University of Coimbra stated that "the death of Stanislav Tomáš is not an isolated case" and that "Roma are victims of permanent state terror, yet, there is little discussion around the issue of police brutality as a result of structural racism."

== Protests ==
After growing criticism on police brutality against Romani people, on June 26 people in Teplice commemorated his death, with some coming from as far away as Hungary and Slovakia.

Commemorations organised by Romani NGOs were held in several European cities: On June 25 in Berlin, organised by RomaTrial e.V. On June 27 in Vienna, organised by the Hochschüler*innenschaft Österreichischer Roma und Romnja (HÖR).

On 6 July Kosovo Romani people demonstrated in Pristina and in front of the Czech embassy to Kosovo.

== Aftermath ==
In March 2022, the General Inspection of Security Forces (GIBS) published the results of their internal investigation into the case. They stated that the police intervention was done in a standard manner, and it was not connected with the subsequent death of the suspect in any way whatsoever. The European Roma Rights Centre called the statement "a denial of justice," while Amnesty International stated that there was "major doubts" about the independence and comprehensiveness of the investigation.

The Czech Constitutional Court dismissed a constitutional appeal in April 2023 brought by the European Roma Rights Centre and the Forum for Human Rights. In August 2023, the organisations filed a case before the European Court of Human Rights on behalf of Tomáš' sister.

=== European Court of Human Rights Ruling ===
On 16 July 2026 the European Court of Human Rights ruled in favour of Tomáš, finding that the police officers actions had violated his right to life (article 2) and constituted inhumane treatment (article 3). It was further ruled that the investigation into Tomáš death was ineffective and lacked independence, constituting an procedural violation of articles 2 and 3, additionally finding that authorities had demonstrated a "manifest lack of diligence" in investigating whether racial bias was involved, and thus also violating article 14 (protection from discrimination). The Court further noted that the officer with an body camera had not activated it, despite a legal obligation to.
