= NoviSpy =

Android spyware used by Serbian state agencies

- Developer: Proprietary
- Operating system: Android
- License: Proprietary

NoviSpy is a proprietary Android spyware application used by state security and law enforcement authorities in Serbia, including the Ministry of Internal Affairs (MUP) and the Security Information Agency (BIA). The software became widely known in late 2024 after an investigation by Amnesty International detailed its deployment against civil society figures, journalists, and political activists.

== History and discovery ==
The operational use of NoviSpy was disclosed in December 2024 through an Amnesty International report titled “A Digital Prison”: Surveillance and the Suppression of Civil Society in Serbia. According to research by digital rights groups and investigative journalists, the spyware was deployed during a wave of public demonstrations in Serbia, particularly surrounding lithium mining protests.

Forensic examination of compromised devices indicated that the targets included investigative reporters, leaders of non-governmental organizations, and anti-mining activists.

== Technical profile and deployment ==
Unlike commercial surveillance tools such as Pegasus or Predator, which frequently rely on remote zero-click exploits, NoviSpy relies primarily on physical access or targeted social engineering.

Digital forensics showed that state agents physically installed the spyware onto targets' mobile phones during instances of police detention, border inspections, or formal interviews where individuals were required to hand over their unlocked devices. Once active on an Android system, NoviSpy grants full remote monitoring capabilities, including extraction of encrypted messaging logs, continuous location tracking, microphone hijacking, and access to stored media files.

The deployment of NoviSpy has been documented in conjunction with commercial hardware extraction tools, notably equipment supplied by Cellebrite. Reports indicated that state agencies utilized Cellebrite hardware to bypass lock screens and acquire historical data, subsequently installing NoviSpy to maintain persistent access to the compromised device.

== Reactions ==
International human rights organizations and press freedom groups expressed concern over the findings, characterizing the systematic deployment of NoviSpy as a violation of basic privacy standards and freedom of expression. Amnesty International urged for stricter oversight of state procurement of surveillance technologies and called for an international moratorium on the trade of forensic tools to governments with documented records of targeting civil society.

== See also ==
- Spyware
- Pegasus (spyware)
- Human rights in Serbia
