= Robert Ritter (disambiguation) =

Robert Ritter (1901–1951) was a Nazi German psychiatrist and racial scientist.

Robert Ritter may also refer to:

- Robert G. Ritter, American dentist
- Robert M. Ritter, editor of 2002–2012 editions of the English style manual New Hart's Rules
- Robert Ritter, fictional CIA character appearing in several Tom Clancy novels

== See also ==
- Robert Ritter von Greim (1892–1945), German Luftwaffe field marshal
