= Eva Justin =

German Nazi quack anthropologist (1909–1966)

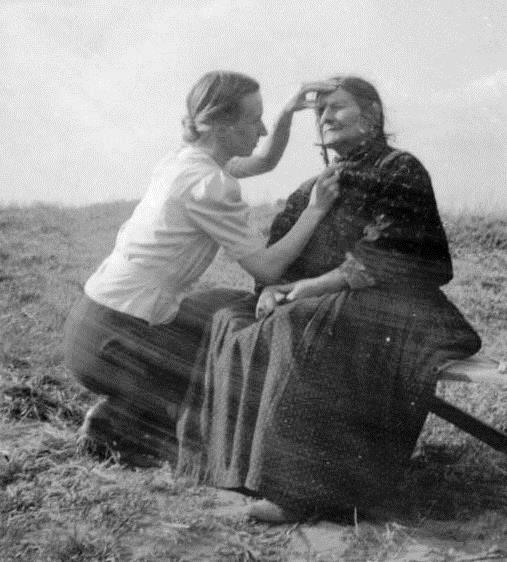
- Eva Justin checking the facial characteristics of a Romani woman as part of her racial studies
- Born: August 23, 1909; Dresden, German Empire
- Died: September 11, 1966 (aged 57); Offenbach am Main, West Germany
- Occupation: Nazi anthropologist

Eva Justin (23 August 1909 – 11 September 1966) was a German anthropologist who was active during the Nazi era. She specialised in scientific racism. Her work contributed to the Romani Holocaust by the Nazis against the Romani people.

== Early life ==
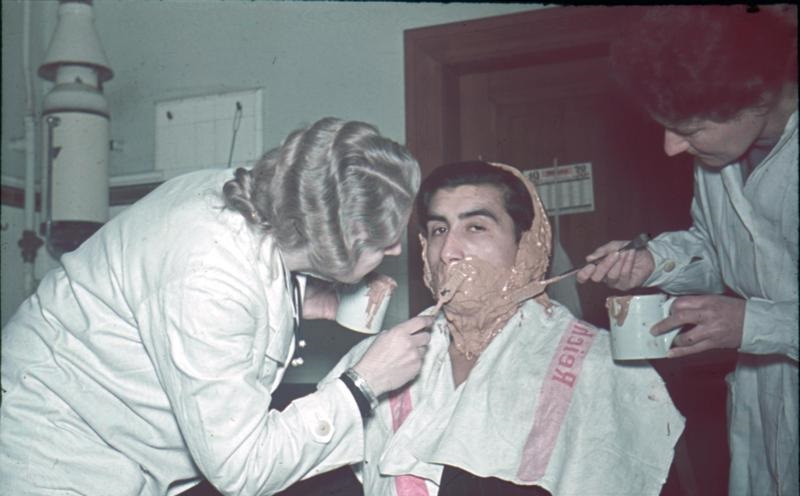
Eva Justin making a facial cast in 1936 on a Romani man

Born in Dresden in 1909, the daughter of a railroad official, Eva Justin served as an assistant to Nazi psychologist Robert Ritter.

Justin originally trained as a nurse and received her doctorate in anthropology from the University of Berlin in 1943 despite not having followed the normal university procedure to do so. Eugen Fischer mentored her through her doctoral thesis and final exams, and ethnologist Richard Thurnwald was a reviewer. Justin was one of the early registered nurses to earn a PhD. Speaking Romani, she earned the trust of Roma and Sinti people. Her doctoral dissertation was titled "Lebensschicksale artfremd erzogener Zigeunerkinder und ihrer Nachkommen" ("Biographical destinies of Gypsy children and their offspring who were educated in a manner inappropriate for their species").

== Holocaust ==
Romani children at St. Josefspflege orphanage in Mulfingen used in Eva Justin's racial studies for her PhD dissertation

The children that Justin studied had been selected for deportation, but this was delayed until she completed her research and received her PhD. The children were later sent to the "Gypsy family camp" at Auschwitz on 6 May 1944. Soon after their arrival, Josef Mengele arrived at Auschwitz. Some of the children were subjected to his experiments and most were eventually killed in the gas chambers. About 39 or 40 children that Justin had studied were sent to Auschwitz in 1944, and all but four died before the end of the war, many before her thesis was published. (Note: Barth states all of them were dead at the time of the publication of her doctoral thesis) Thirty-nine children from an orphanage in Mulfingen, who were the subjects of Justin's doctoral thesis, were registered at Auschwitz on 12 May 1944. She searched for anthropological subjects in concentration camps.

Justin was a senior member of the Race Hygiene Research Center. She wrote in the foreword to a research paper that she hoped to provide the basis for further racial hygiene laws to stop the flow of "unworthy primitive elements" into the German population. Her position was that Romani people could not be assimilated because "they usually became asocial as a result of their primitive thinking, and that attempts to educate them should be stopped." Justin proposed sterilization for Romani people, except for those with "pure Gypsy blood." She was present when the Sinti and Roma deportations to concentration camps were organized.

In 1958, the Frankfurt district attorney initiated an investigation into Justin's wartime actions, but the investigation was closed in 1960, (Note: Barth writes, "In one case Justin was acquitted; the other charges never came to court.) after the district attorney had concluded that her actions were subject to the statute of limitations. Frankfurt magistrates found insufficient evidence to prosecute Justin in 1964, believing that Justin had not known her ideas would lead to the children being sent to concentration camps and that survivors could not specifically remember her striking them. Justin had based her work on the ideas of Robert Ritter and no longer believed them.

In post-war West Germany, Justin worked as a psychologist for the Frankfurt police, even acting as a consultant to the legal system for compensation cases for Holocaust survivors. She died from cancer in 1966 in Offenbach am Main, a city on the outskirts of Frankfurt.
