= R (European Roma Rights Centre) v Immigration Officer at Prague Airport =

- Court: House of Lords
- Decided: 9 December 2004
- Citation: [2005] Imm AR 100, 18 BHRC 1, [2005] IRLR 115, [2005] UKHRR 530, [2005] 1 All ER 527, [2005] 2 AC 1, [2005] INLR 182, [2005] HRLR 4, [2004] UKHL 55

Case history
- Prior action: [2003] EWCA Civ 666

Court membership
- Judges sitting: Lord Bingham of Cornhill, Lord Steyn, Lord Hope of Craighead, Baroness Hale of Richmond and Lord Carswell

Keywords
- Direct discrimination, immigration

R (European Roma Rights Centre) v Immigration Officer at Prague Airport [2004] UKHL 55 is a UK asylum case concerning Article 33 of the Convention Relating to the Status of Refugees. The case concerned itself with the lawfulness of actions taken by British immigration personnel stationed in Prague. The outcome found that discriminatory actions were undertaken against Roma seeking to travel to the UK.

== Facts ==
British immigration officials pre-cleared passengers boarding flights within Immigration Rules. If officers concluded that the passengers would claim asylum once they arrived, they would be refused entry. The ERRC brought this action, alleging direct discrimination, on behalf of a group of asylum-seekers. The claimants, represented by Lester QC, said that the Government, represented by Greenwood QC, was breaching its international obligations.

The Court of Appeal distanced itself from the "but for" test by a majority, holding that there was no discrimination. Laws LJ dissented.

== Judgment ==
The House of Lords held the system was inherently and systematically discriminatory, contrary to RRA 1976 s 1(1)(a). Roma were deliberately intensively questioned because the officers knew that practically all Czech asylum seekers were Roma. So, applying Nagarajan v London Regional Transport, they were treated less favourably on racial grounds, contrary to domestic and international law. Lord Steyn said the following.

there is in law a single issue: why did the immigration officers treat Roma less favourably than non-Roma? In my view the only realistic answer is that they did so because the persons concerned were Roma. They discriminated on the grounds of race. The motive for such discrimination is irrelevant.

Baroness Hale also said that the "object of the legislation is to ensure that each person is treated as an individual and not assumed to be like other members of the group." The legislation "makes no reference at all to justification in relation to direct discrimination. Nor, strictly, does it allow indirect discrimination to be justified. It accepts that a requirement or condition may be justified independently of its discriminatory effect."

The appeal, however, failed in that there was no international law that required the Roma to be allowed into the country before they applied for asylum.

Lord Bingham, Lord Hope and Lord Carswell gave concurring judgments.

== See also ==
- Convention Relating to the Status of Refugees
- Sale v. Haitian Centers Council
