= Jan Marinus Wiersma =

Dutch politician

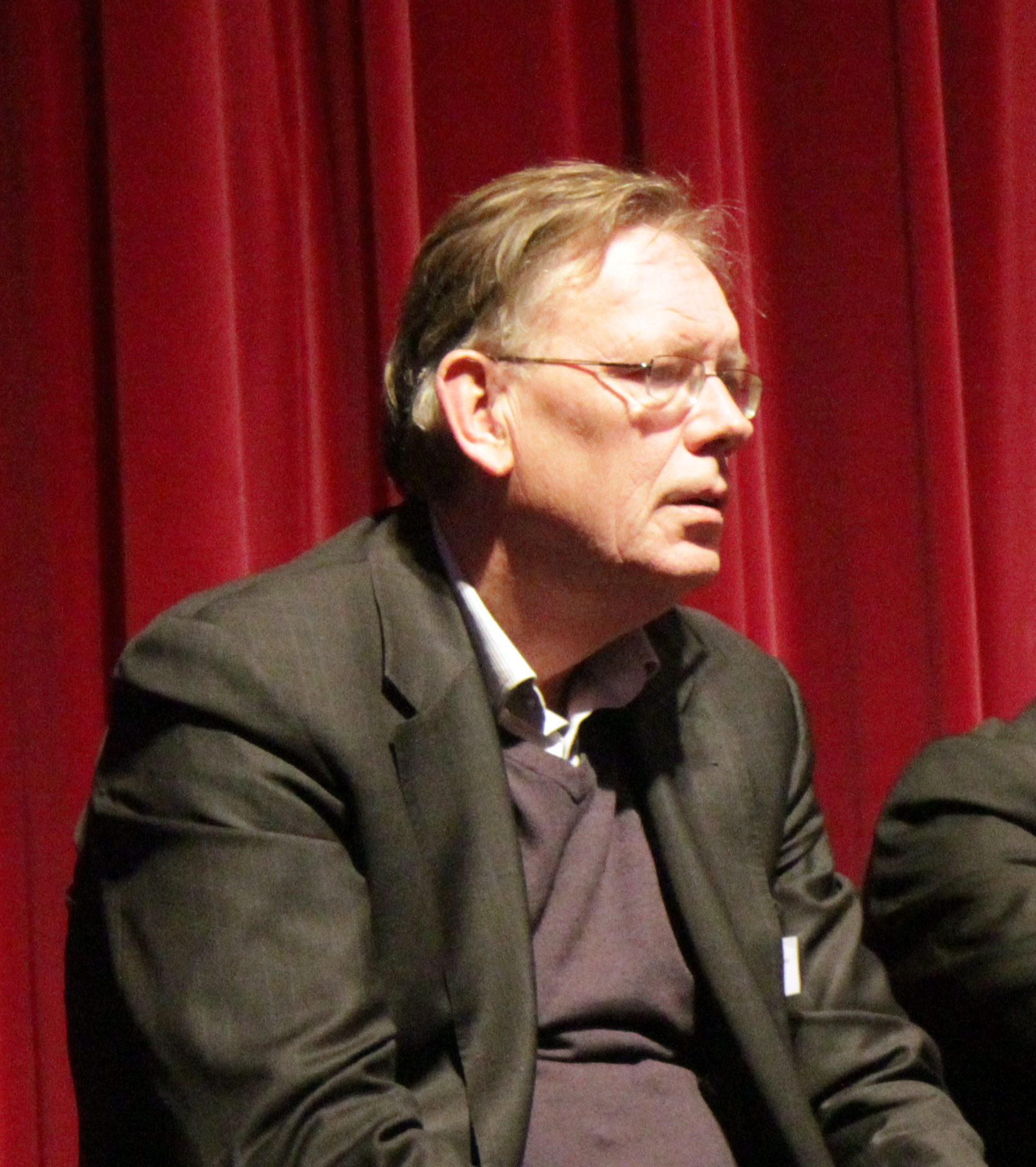
Jan Marinus Wiersma

Jan Marinus Wiersma (born 26 August 1951 in Groningen) is a Dutch politician and from 1994 to 2009 Member of the European Parliament. He is a member of the Labour Party, vice-chair of the Party of European Socialists group, and sits on the European Parliament's Committee on Foreign Affairs.

He was also a member of the Subcommittee on Security and Defence, a substitute for the Committee on Transport and Tourism, a member of the delegation to the EU–Romania Joint Parliamentary Committee, and a member of the delegation to the EU–Moldova Parliamentary Cooperation Committee.

== Career ==
- Higher degree in history (Groningen State University, 1978)
- Researcher on Foreign Affairs and Defence for the parliamentary PvdA group in the Second Chamber (1978–1987)
- International Secretary and second Vice-Chairman of the PvdA (1987–1999)
- Member of the European Parliament (1994–2009)
- Vice-Chairman of the PSE Group (1999–2004)
- Member of the PSE bureau (since 2004)
- Member of the Steering Committee of the European Forum for Democracy and Solidarity
