= Romani people in Mitrovica refugee camps =

In 2008 there were about 500–700 Romani people in Mitrovica refugee camps. These three camps were created by the UN in Kosovo. The camps are based around disused heavy metals mines which have fallen out of use since the end of the Kosovo War of 1999. There have been complaints that the residents are suffering severe lead poisoning. According to a 2010 Human Rights Watch, Romani displaced from the Romani quarter in Mitrovica, due to its destruction in 2000, continued to be inmates of camps in north Mitrovica (Cesmin Lug, Osterode and Leposavic), where they were exposed to environmental lead poisoning.

== Current situation ==
A number of people have been resettled to the local mahala and to the former French UN barracks.

The current situation is that approximately 150 Romani, Ashkali and Egyptian families live in the camps of North Mitrovica. There are plans to resettle the majority of these families to the Romani Mahala neighbourhood in the main part of the city (across the Rivar Ibar), where 100 families already reside. The community is receiving assistance from a number of local and international NGOs.

The former French barracks, Osterode camp, is managed by a local NGO Kosovo Agency for Advocacy and Development (KAAD) - funded by the Kosovo Ministry for Communities and Returns, while the nearby Cesmin Lug camp, where living conditions are noticeably poorer, is officially under the jurisdiction of the United Nations Mission in Kosovo (UNMIK) in Mitrovicë/a.

Unemployment is extremely high in the community of relocation, Romani Mahala and Mitrovica more generally. There was a commitment to close the camps by the end of 2010 but this goal may be overambitious, especially as Western European countries continue to forcibly return RAE people to Kosovo despite the obvious lack of absorptive capacity in the receiving society.

== Background ==
A BBC article of June 2005 said that the European Roma Rights Centre was preparing legal action against the United Nations Interim Administration Mission in Kosovo (UNMIK), the interim Kosovan Government over its failure to relocate the remaining residents.

== Response ==
An article was written by Paul Polansky in the New York Times regarding the state of the camp inmates in April 2005. Subsequently, the International Committee of the Red Cross, Amnesty International, the Society for Threatened Peoples, Refugees International and many other humanitarian organizations have been demanding that the UN immediately evacuate these three camps. Legal actions have been taken by the European Roma Rights Centre. On 20 February 2006, ERRC filed a lawsuit against UNMIK with the European Court of Human Rights in Strasbourg. On 24 March 2006, a meeting was held by the United Nations Human Rights Committee to review the ERRC's report on the human rights situation in Mitrovica. In 2006, it was reported that new sites were being found for the Romani refugees, however the suitability of the sites, i.e. their location in Albanian areas, and the progress towards relocation of the inmates was not available to the report. According to UNMIK, smelting of lead by camp inhabitants has contributed to their exposure to lead poisoning, Chachipe, a Romani rights advocacy organization, has debated this contention of UNMIK as a ploy to draw attention away from the real sources of lead contamination, the heaps of soil behind the Cesmin Lug and Osterode camps.

== Documentaries ==
A documentary about the issue, Gypsy Blood: The Roma, Ashali and Egyptian IDPs of Kosovska Mitrovica, Kosovo was completed in July 2005 by American film-maker Daniel Lanctot. This documentary was screened at numerous international venues. It won the award for Best Informative Film at the Golden Wheel Film Festival (2005) in Skopje, Republic of Macedonia. Also in 2005, it screened at a European Parliament hearing on the "Situation of Roma women in the European Union" and at the International "One World Festival of Documentary Films on Human Rights" in Pristina. Dateline's UN's Toxic Shame by Amos Roberts, a scathing review of the UN's inaction on this scandal, aired in Australia on 26 April 2009.

== See also ==
- Romani people in Kosovo
- Environmental racism in Europe
