= Chachipe =

Luxembourgish Roma rights and advocacy non-governmental organization

- Founded: 2009
- Type: Non-profit; NGO
- Location: Europe (registered in Luxembourg)
- Services: Roma rights
- Fields: Media attention, direct-appeal campaigns, research, lobbying
- Key people: Karin Waringo and Murat Haliti
- Website: http://romarights.wordpress.com/

Chachipe a. s. b. l. (earlier Romano Them) is a Luxembourg based Roma rights and advocacy non-governmental organisation. It was established in 2009. Karin Waringo is the president of Chachipe. Chachipe has demanded that Roma refugees to EU countries from the former Yugoslavia should not be denied a right to asylum based on the "safe country of origin" doctrine, as they face discrimination in their home countries. Chachipe contributed to the preparation of Human rights of Roma and Travellers in Europe a report commissioned and published by the Commissioner of Human Rights, Council of Europe.

== Etymology ==
Chachipe is a Roma word meaning truth, and pronounced tsatsipé it is derived from Sanskrit sat meaning truth and chipé meaning tongue, literally true tongue.
