= European Roma Rights Centre =

Organisation

- Type: Human rights organisation
- Founded: 1996; Budapest, Hungary
- Headquarters: Brussels, Belgium
- Number of locations: Europe
- Key people: Ðorđe Jovanović, President Ethel Brooks, Board Chair
- Revenue: 2,051,903 (2019)
- Website: www.errc.org

The European Roma Rights Centre (ERRC) is a Roma-led, international public interest law organisation engaging in a range of activities aimed at combating anti-Romani racism and human rights abuse of Romani people. The approach of the ERRC involves, in particular, strategic litigation, international advocacy, research and policy development, human rights focused news production, and the training of Romani activists.

The ERRC is a member of the International Helsinki Federation for Human Rights and has consultative status with the Council of Europe, as well as with the Economic and Social Council of the United Nations. The organisation was created in 1996 in Budapest, Hungary and is now based in Brussels, Belgium.

== Foundation ==
The European Roma Rights Centre grew out of a response to a police brutality case in Bulgaria, where Roma rights activists worked with Open Society Foundations lawyers to win a legal victory. A key individual in their early work was Hungarian activist Ferenc Kőszeg, who has subsequently been credited with founding the organisation. The ERRC drew inspiration for their work from the impact of the strategic litigation used by the NAACP during the 20th century to advance the cause of civil rights in the US.

Following its foundation, the ERRC won its first legal victory in the Czech constitutional court in 1996. Over the next ten years the organisation created over 580 publications, lodged 500 cases in a variety of European countries and trained over one thousand Roma activists. During this period, the ERRC was involved in some significant cases including representing Roma people affected by the 1993 Hădăreni pogrom and the Danilovgrad pogrom in Montenegro.

== Activities ==
=== Strategic litigation ===
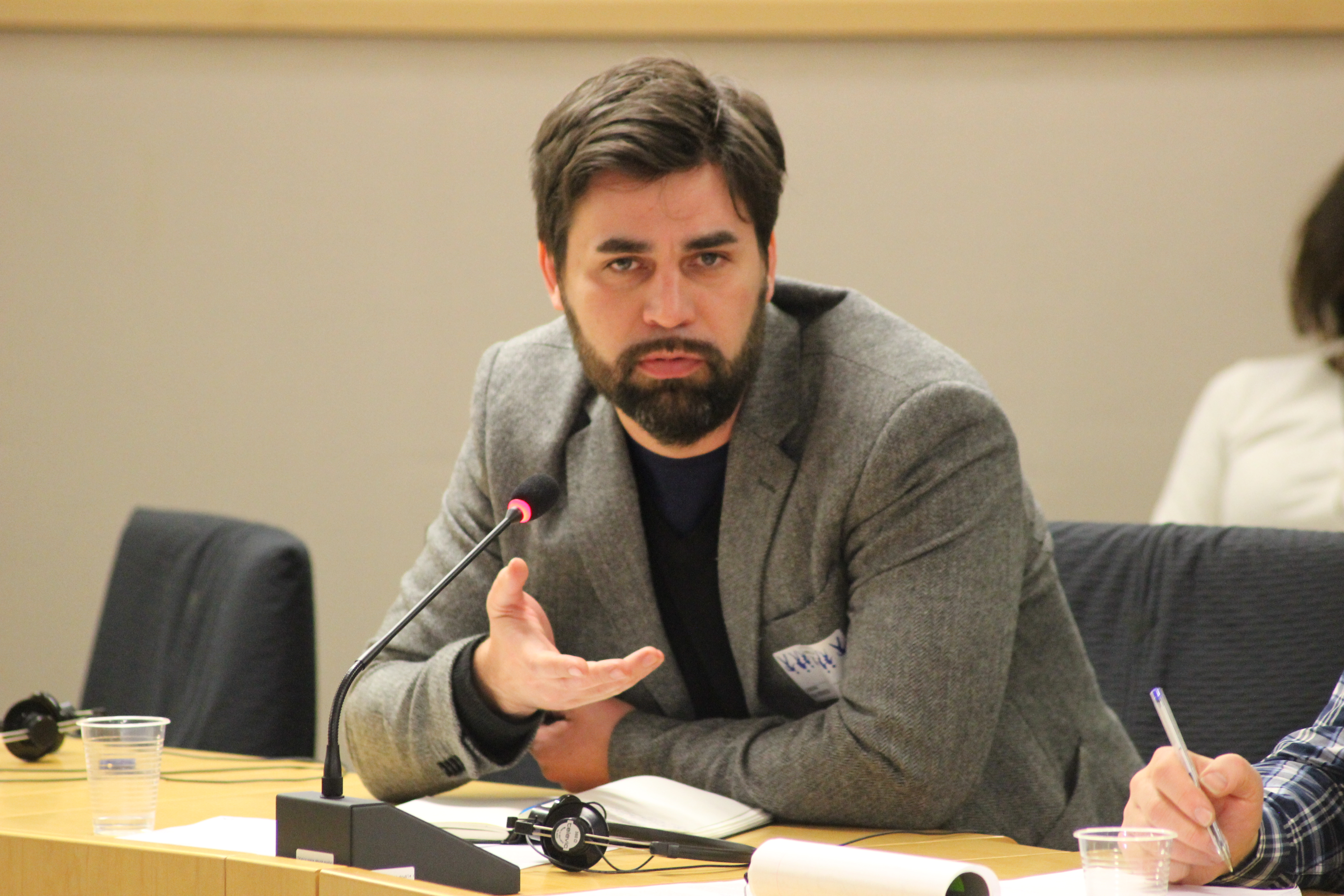
Marek Szilvási speaks on behalf of the ERRC at the European Commission in Brussels in 2015.

The ERRC is active in impact litigation (also called strategic litigation). Since its inception, the ERRC has taken over 1000 cases relating to Roma Rights, and usually has over 150 cases pending in national and international courts at any given time. The ERRC's legal work takes different forms including the provision of direct legal representation and support to Romani litigants. The ERRC also creates legal submissions for international tribunals, such as the European court of human rights and for UN treaty bodies. The organisation seeks to influence at both a national and European level, and litigates across a broad range of issues including education, environment, migration, enforcement, identity, health, and issues affecting children.

The ERRC has won cases against Belgium, France, Greece, Italy, and Bulgaria (among others) before the European Committee of Social Rights; besides this, ERRC lawyers have represented Romani applicants in numerous cases before the European Court of Human Rights, including D.H. and Others v. the Czech Republic and Oršuš and Others v. Croatia. The ERRC has also launched strategic litigation in the United Kingdom with a notable case being the 2004 R (European Roma Rights Centre) v Immigration Officer at Prague Airport contested in the House of Lords.

=== Research and public policy ===
The ERRC publishes research on a broad range of issues affecting Romani communities. The organisation creates its reports using a wide range of methods including work with a broad network of lawyers, journalists, research partners, monitoring bodies and relevant subject specialists. In some instances, the ERRC plays a supporting role for research happening at a local level or creates research reports that review relevant secondary literature.

The 2004 "Roma in an Enlarged European Union" report has reached a broad audience of policymakers and was published by the Directorate General of Employment and Social Affairs of the European Commission. The ERRC has influenced the European Union enlargement by pressuring candidate countries to comply with the Copenhagen criteria and ensuring that the Roma situation is a priority issue. The organisation often reports to UN Committees such as the Committee on the Elimination of Racial Discrimination (CERD) or the Committee on the Elimination of Discrimination against Women (CEDAW) about Roma communities. During the recent Coronavirus pandemic, the group published "Roma rights in the time of Covid", an in-depth analysis of discrimination and rights abuses across twelve EU states during 2020.

=== International advocacy ===
In 2016 the ERRC became a Roma-majority organisation, and in 2018 launched the ERRC Roma Rights Defenders, a large volunteer network who contribute to the ERRC and its various projects. This includes a broad range of activities including campaigning, field work and online organising.

The ERRC is the recipient of numerous human rights awards including the 2007 Max van Der Stoel Prize, the 2009 Gruber Prize for Justice, the 2012 Stockholm Human Rights Prize, and the 2018 Raoul Wallenberg Award.

=== Human rights training ===
An important part of the ERRC's work involves the provision of training and educational projects for Romani activists. Past training has focused on developing the capabilities of NGO's who work with Roma communities, activists who are part of Romani rights groups and others working in the field of civil society, human rights and strategic litigation. Other forms of training have also been delivered by the ERRC, including single-issue sessions that focus on a particular topic such as migration, housing rights or legal rights. Training has been delivered in a large variety of different cities in Europe.

The centrepiece of the ERRC's human rights training work is the annual Roma Rights Summer School, which seeks to train new generations of Romani human rights activists over a 10-day residential course in various European cities. The Summer School was a pillar of the ERRC's work since its founding until 2012. After a ten-year-hiatus, the Summer School was revived in 2022 in Budapest and continues to accept applications from Roma, Sinti, and Travellers from around Europe every July.

== See also ==
- Roma people
- Romani society and culture
- Roma in Mitrovica Camps
- Romani language
