= Robert Ritter =

German psychologist

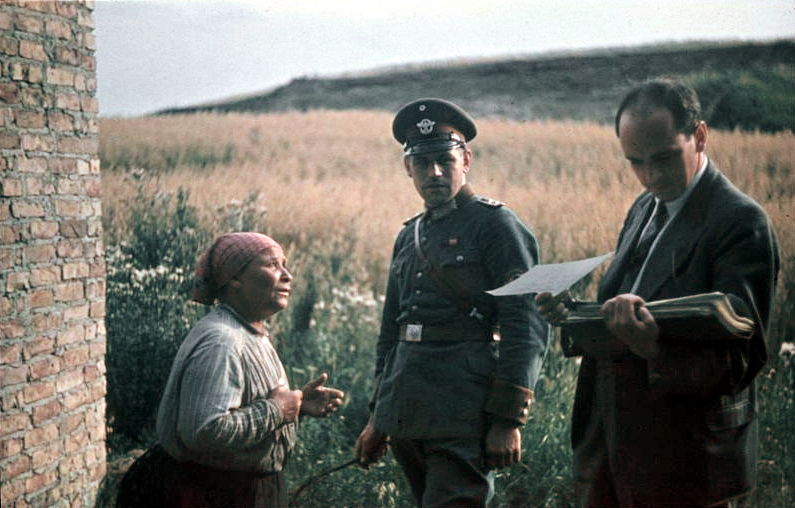
- Robert Ritter (far right) in 1936, talking to a Romani woman
- Born: 14 May 1901; Aachen, Rhine Province, Prussia
- Died: 15 April 1951 (aged 49); Oberursel, Hesse, West Germany
- Education: Ludwig-Maximilians-Universität München
- Scientific career
- Thesis: Versuch einer Sexualpädagogik auf psychologischer Grundlage (1927)

Robert Ritter (14 May 1901 – 15 April 1951) was a German racial scientist doctor of psychology and medicine, with a background in child psychiatry and the biology of criminality. In 1936, Ritter was appointed head of the Racial Hygiene and Demographic Biology Research Unit of Nazi Germany's Criminal Police, to establish the genealogical histories of the German "Gypsies", both Roma and Sinti, and became the "architect of the experiments Roma and Sinti were subjected to." His pseudo-scientific "research" in classifying these populations of Germany aided the Nazi government in their systematic persecution toward a goal of "racial purity".

== Early life ==
Ritter was born in 1901 in Aachen, Germany. He attended an exclusive secondary school, as well as a Prussian military academy. After a stint in the German Freikorps, Ritter began his formal education studying at various universities.

In 1927, Ritter received his doctorate in educational psychology at the Ludwig-Maximilians-Universität München. Post-doctorate, Ritter continued his education and received a medical degree from Heidelberg University in 1930, and was medically licensed the same year. In 1934, two years before being appointed as head of the German police's racial hygiene research unit, Ritter received his specialist certification in child psychology, studying the inheritability of criminality. He completed part of his residence in the University of Tübingen.

== Career ==
=== Ritter and the Sterilization Law of 1933 ===
Nazi seizure of power in 1933 allowed the party to transform their ideology of racial purity into policy. The Law for the Prevention of Genetically Diseased Offspring was put into effect New Year's Day, 1934, and included compulsory sterilization of individuals who, according to medical knowledge, were likely to pass on to their offspring a serious physical or mental disorder. Besides a diagnosed medical disorder, citizens would also be sterilized for being classified as asocial.

An asocial diagnosis was often associated with having "moral" or "disguised mental retardation", despite showing no deficit in intelligence. Ritter was responsible for the invention of "disguised mental retardation". According to Ritter, individuals, especially children with this alleged disorder displayed certain independence and cunning and were quick talkers. "Disguised mental retardation" supposedly carried a mask of cleverness, which the pseudo-scientific medical specialists characterized as disguised mental retardation: if they couldn't actually observe and demonstrate a mental problem, they simply insisted it was present anyway, and that evidence of its opposite was some kind of trick.

The Nazi government used this alleged disorder as a justification to sterilize an estimated 500 Roma and Sinti individuals between 1933 and 1939.

=== Methods of research ===
The task of the Rassenhygienische und Bevolkerungsbiologische Forschungsstelle (English: Racial Hygiene and Demographic Biology Research Unit), a division of the Kriminalpolizei (Criminal Police), was to identify and categorize all Roma and Sinti people in Germany according to racial standards. Ritter, heading this organization, had a team of other racial scientists including Eva Justin, Adolf Wurth, Sophie Ehrhardt, and Ruth Kellermann.

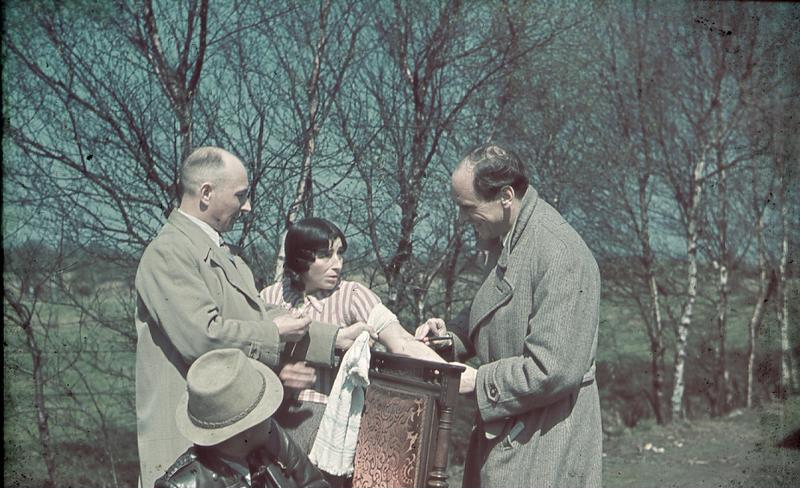
Ritter (right) taking blood from a woman, 1936

By 1937, the Research Unit was working with the Central Office of Reich Security, and the Reich Ministry of Interior, to travel across Germany in units to register "full-blooded" and "mixed-race" Roma or Sinti. The units referenced church records to track individuals' genealogies. As some of Ritter's assistants spoke Romani, they would interrogate Roma individuals who could not provide paper proof of their racial identity. Anyone who balked was threatened with incarceration.

Along with tracking genealogies, the units photographed their subjects, took blood samples, and made anthropometric measurements. Ritter wanted the data to prove that the Roma and Sinti populations were genetically pre-disposed to crime as a "lesser race".

== Ritter in post-Nazi Germany ==
Despite the denazification of Germany after World War II, Ritter was not required to take responsibility for his actions towards the Roma and Sinti population during Nazi rule. In 1947, Oskar and Vizenz Rose, Sinti Holocaust survivors, hired a private detective to track down Ritter. In 1949, authorities in Frankfurt opened an investigation into Ritter's role during the Nazi era; however, the case against Ritter was dismissed as it was concluded that statements made by "Gypsies" should not be believed.

Ritter was hired to teach criminal biology at the University of Tübingen from 1944 to 1946, and was later brought in by the Frankfurt Health Office as a pediatrician. He hired his former assistant, Eva Justin, to work with him as a psychologist.

Ritter, who had been in poor health for some time, died in 1951.
