= Domosławice =

- Village
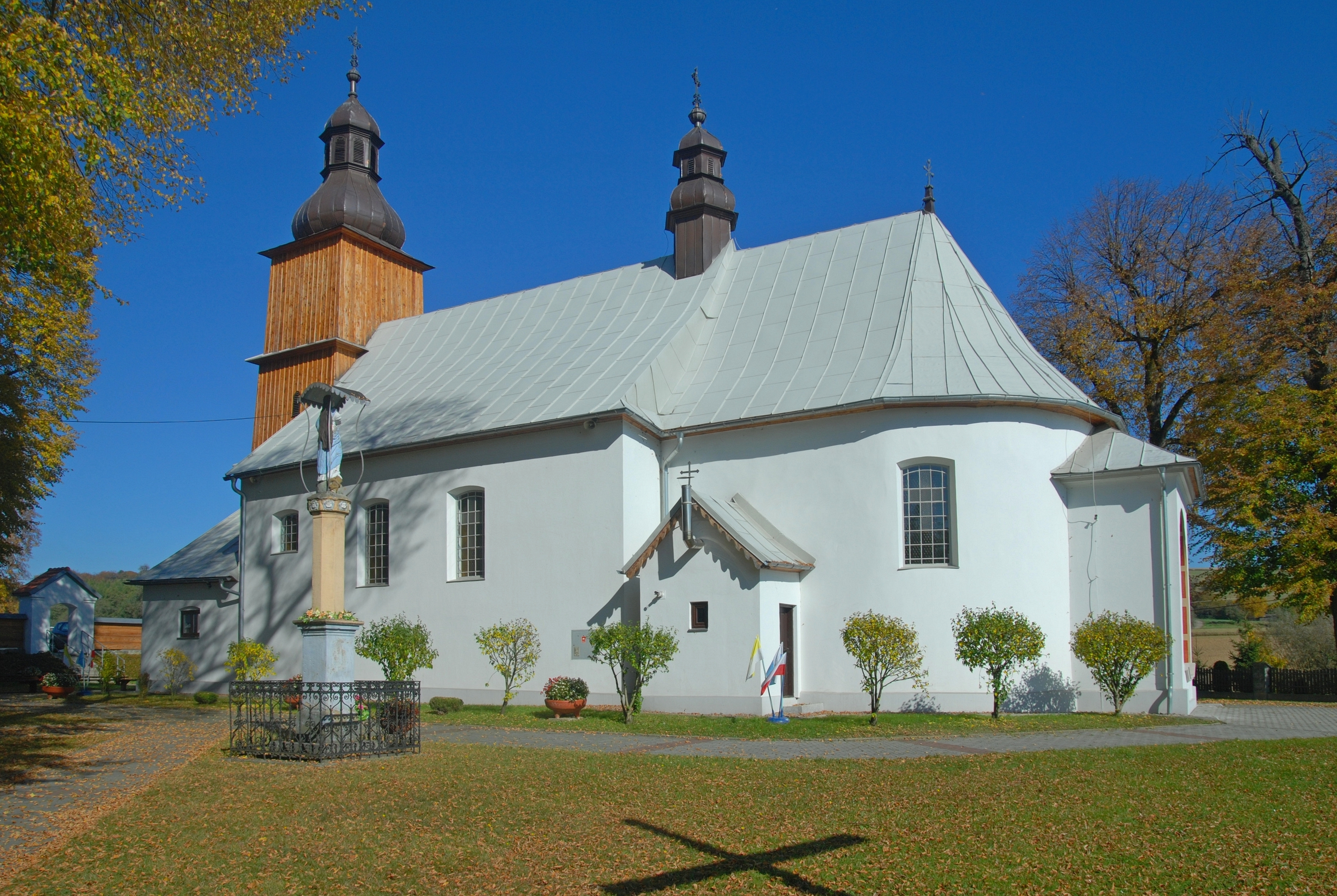
- Church of the Visitation of the Virgin Mary

- Location within Poland
- Coordinates: 49°51′54″N 20°43′18″E
- Country: Poland
- Voivodeship: Lesser Poland
- County: Brzesko
- Gmina: Czchów

Domosławice [dɔmɔswaˈvit͡sɛ] is a village in the administrative district of Gmina Czchów, within Brzesko County, Lesser Poland Voivodeship, in southern Poland.
