= Kwików =

- Village
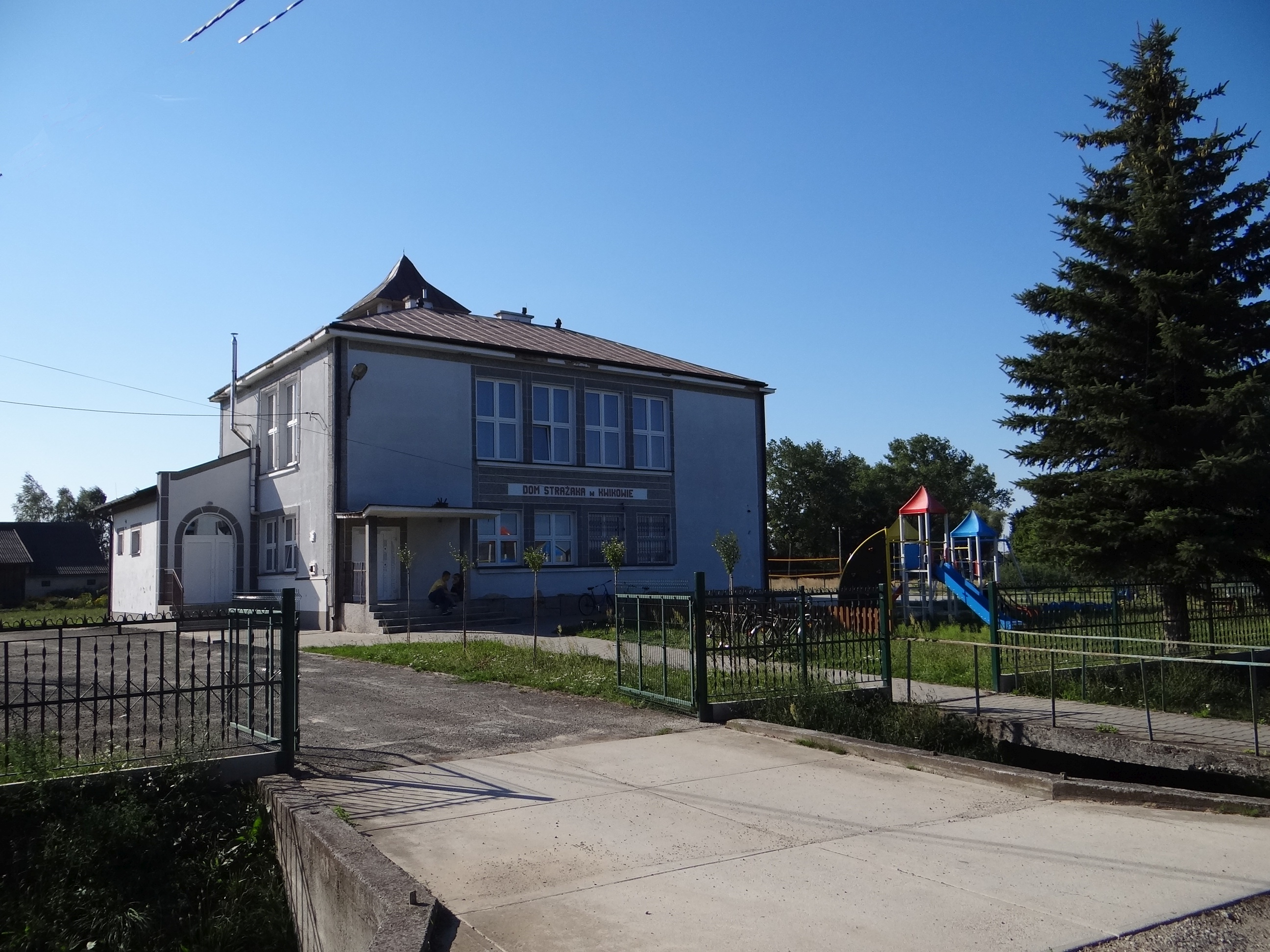

- Location within Poland
- Coordinates: 50°8′N 20°39′E
- Country: Poland
- Voivodeship: Lesser Poland
- County: Brzesko
- Gmina: Szczurowa
- Population: 233

Kwików [ˈkfikuf] is a village in the administrative district of Gmina Szczurowa, within Brzesko County, Lesser Poland Voivodeship, in southern Poland.
