= Rylowa =

- Village
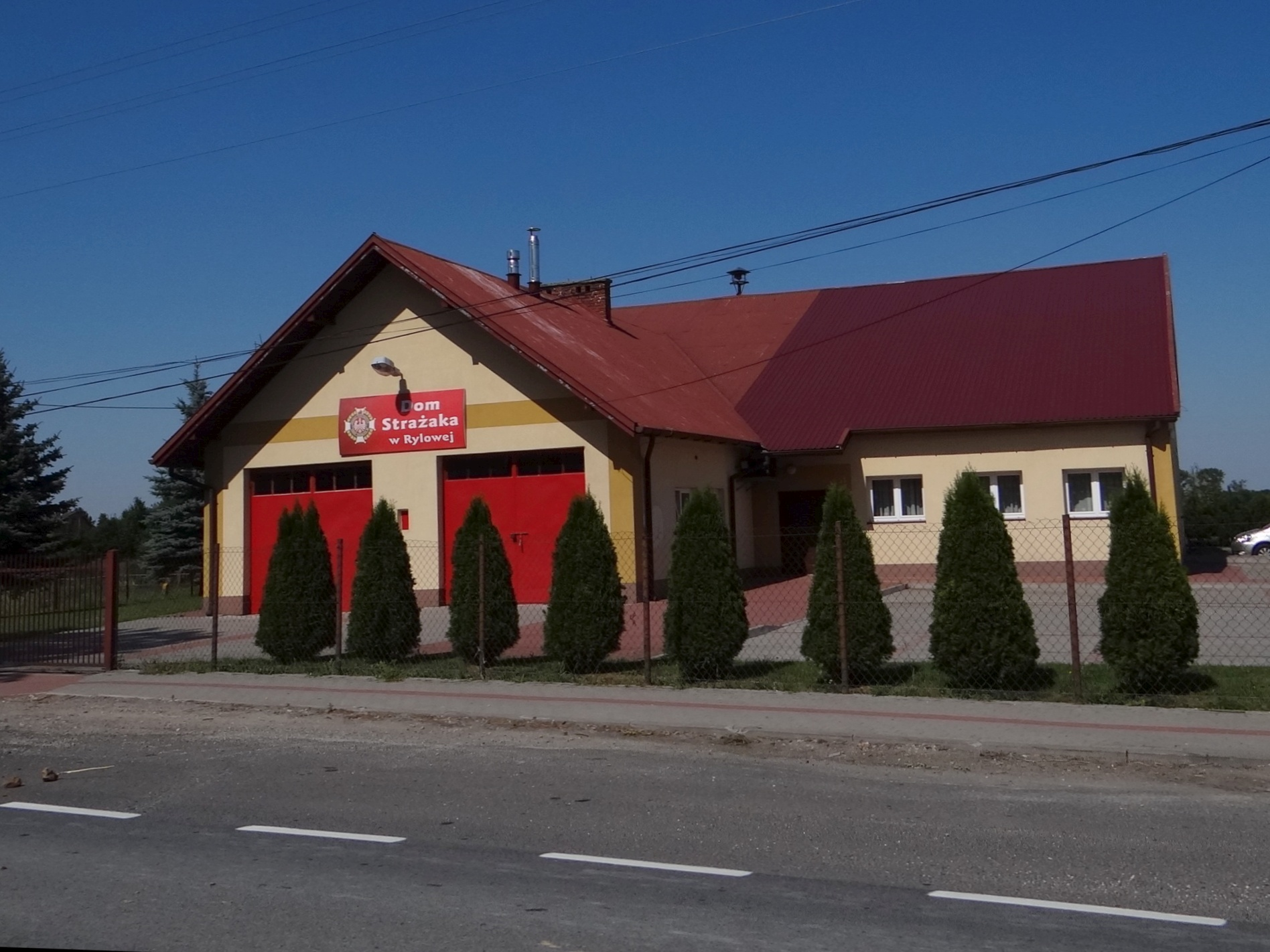
- Fire station

- Location within Poland
- Coordinates: 50°6′N 20°40′E
- Country: Poland
- Voivodeship: Lesser Poland
- County: Brzesko
- Gmina: Szczurowa

Rylowa [rɨˈlɔva] is a village in the administrative district of Gmina Szczurowa, within Brzesko County, Lesser Poland Voivodeship, in southern Poland.
