= Kopacze Wielkie =

- Village
- Location within Poland
- Coordinates: 50°10′N 20°38′E
- Country: Poland
- Voivodeship: Lesser Poland
- County: Brzesko
- Gmina: Szczurowa

Kopacze Wielkie [kɔˈpat͡ʂɛ ˈvjɛlkʲɛ] is a village in the administrative district of Gmina Szczurowa, within Brzesko County, Lesser Poland Voivodeship, in southern Poland.
