= Połom Mały =

- Village
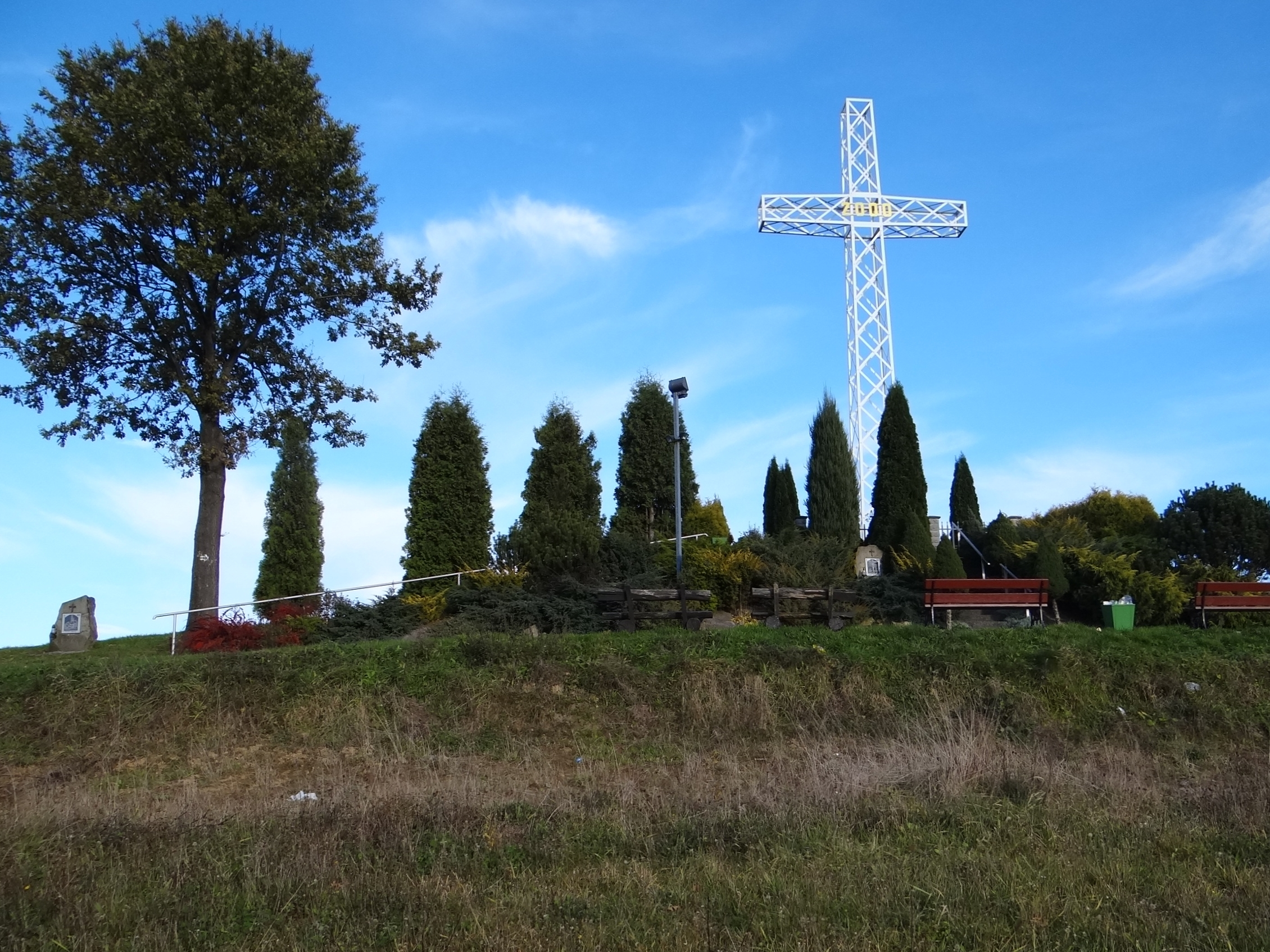

- Location within Poland
- Coordinates: 49°47′38″N 20°37′37″E
- Country: Poland
- Voivodeship: Lesser Poland
- County: Brzesko
- Gmina: Iwkowa

Połom Mały [ˈpɔwɔm ˈmawɨ] is a village in the administrative district of Gmina Iwkowa, within Brzesko County, Lesser Poland Voivodeship, in southern Poland.
