= Tymowa =

Tymowa may refer to the following places in Poland:

- Tymowa, Lower Silesian Voivodeship (south-west Poland)
- Tymowa, Lesser Poland Voivodeship (south Poland)
