= Lewniowa =

- Village
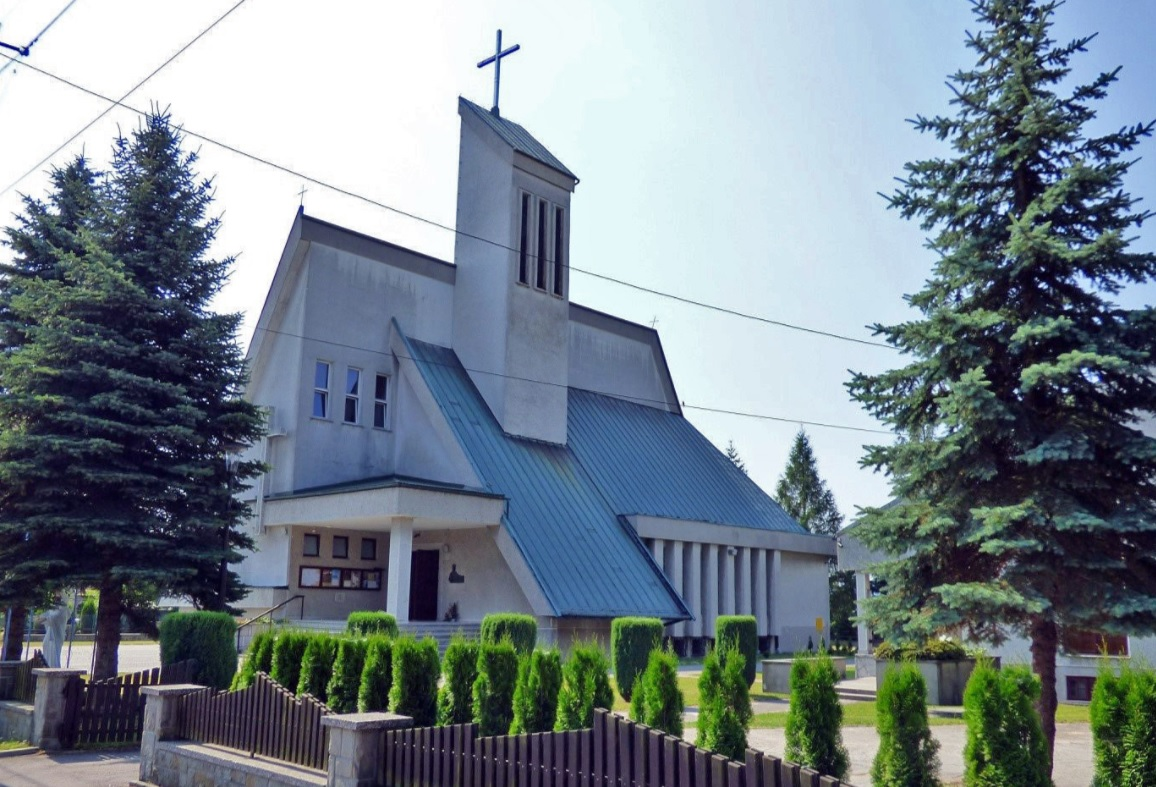
- Catholic church

- Location within Poland
- Coordinates: 49°53′N 20°38′E
- Country: Poland
- Voivodeship: Lesser Poland
- County: Brzesko
- Gmina: Gnojnik
- Highest elevation: 450 m (1,480 ft)
- Lowest elevation: 320 m (1,050 ft)
- Population: 888
- Website: http://www.szkola.lewniowa.pl/

Lewniowa [lɛvˈɲɔva] is a village in the administrative district of Gmina Gnojnik, within Brzesko County, Lesser Poland Voivodeship, in southern Poland.
