= Wytrzyszczka =

- Village
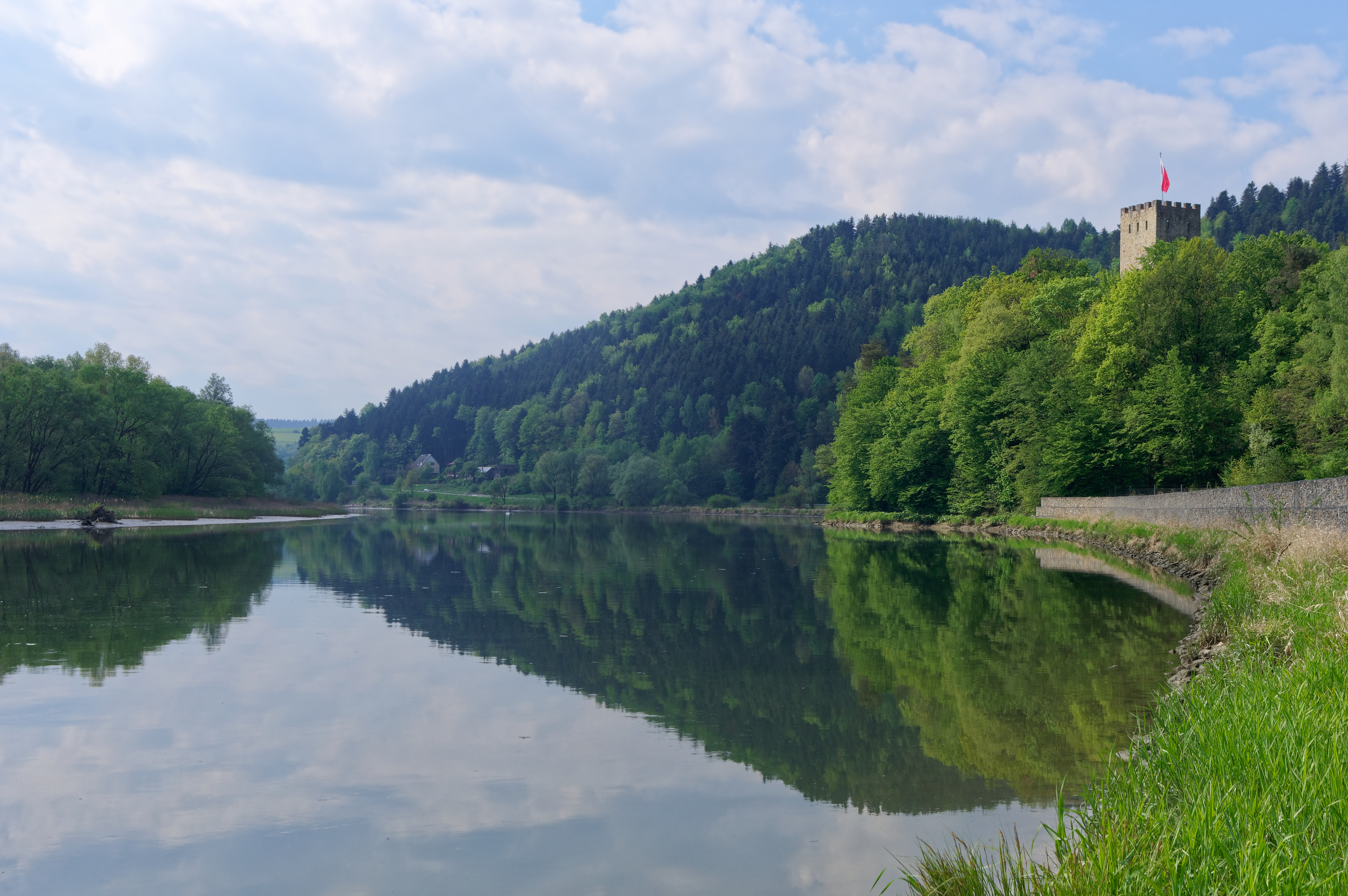
- Czchów Lake and Tropsztyn Castle in Wytrzyszczka

- Location within Poland
- Coordinates: 49°49′N 20°38′E
- Country: Poland
- Voivodeship: Lesser Poland
- County: Brzesko
- Gmina: Czchów
- Elevation: 420 m (1,380 ft)

Population
  - Total: 458
- Time zone: UTC+1 (CET)
  - Summer (DST): UTC+2 (CEST)
- Postal code: 32-860
- Vehicle registration: KBR

Wytrzyszczka [vɨˈtʂɨʂt͡ʂka] is a village in the administrative district of Gmina Czchów, within Brzesko County, Lesser Poland Voivodeship, in southern Poland.
