= Zaborów, Lesser Poland Voivodeship =

Zaborów
- Village
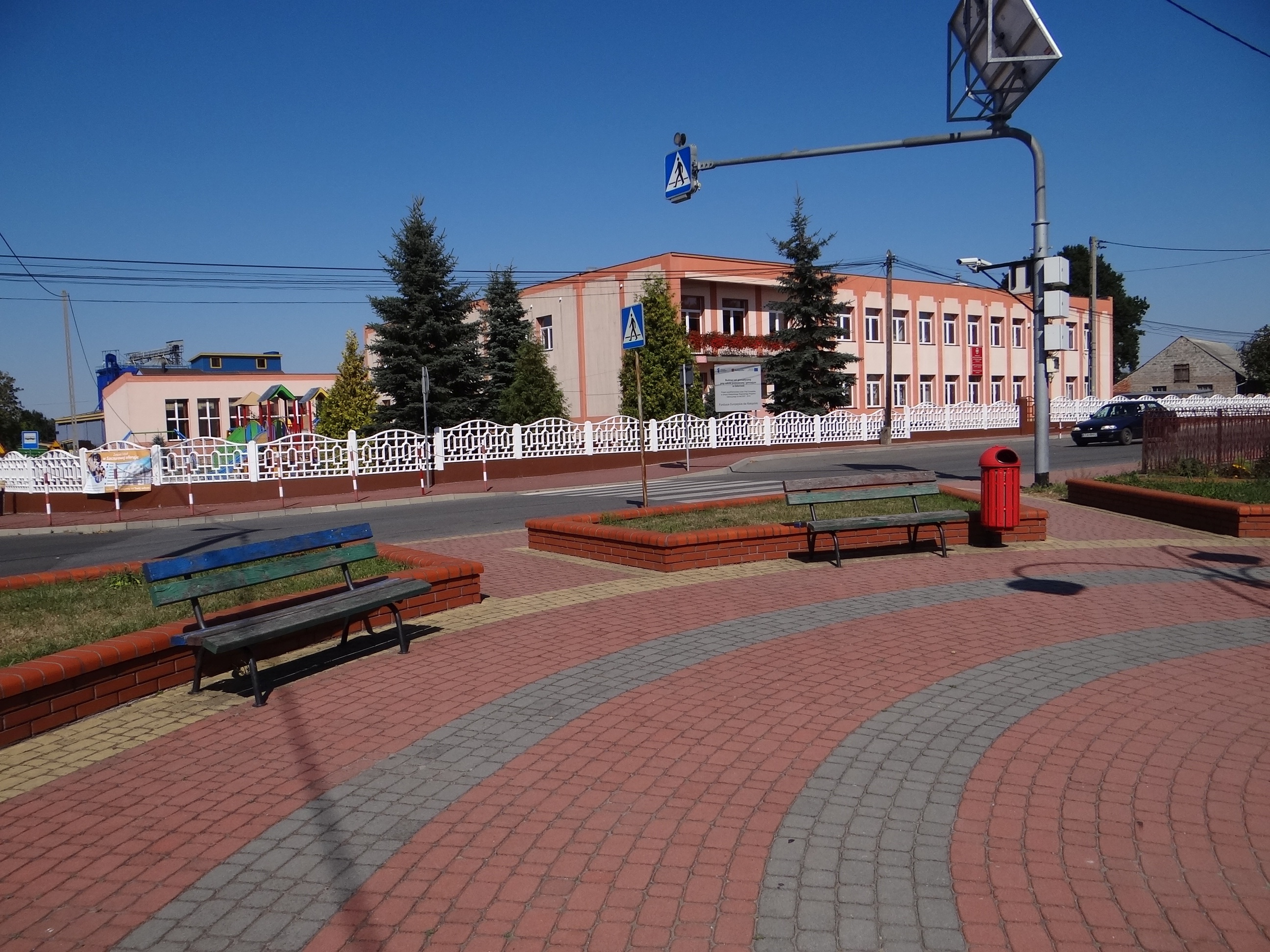
- School

- Location within Poland
- Coordinates: 50°8′N 20°41′E
- Country: Poland
- Voivodeship: Lesser Poland
- County: Brzesko
- Gmina: Szczurowa
- Population: 568

Zaborów [zaˈbɔruf] is a village in the administrative district of Gmina Szczurowa, within Brzesko County, Lesser Poland Voivodeship, in southern Poland.
