= Górka, Lesser Poland Voivodeship =

Górka
- Village
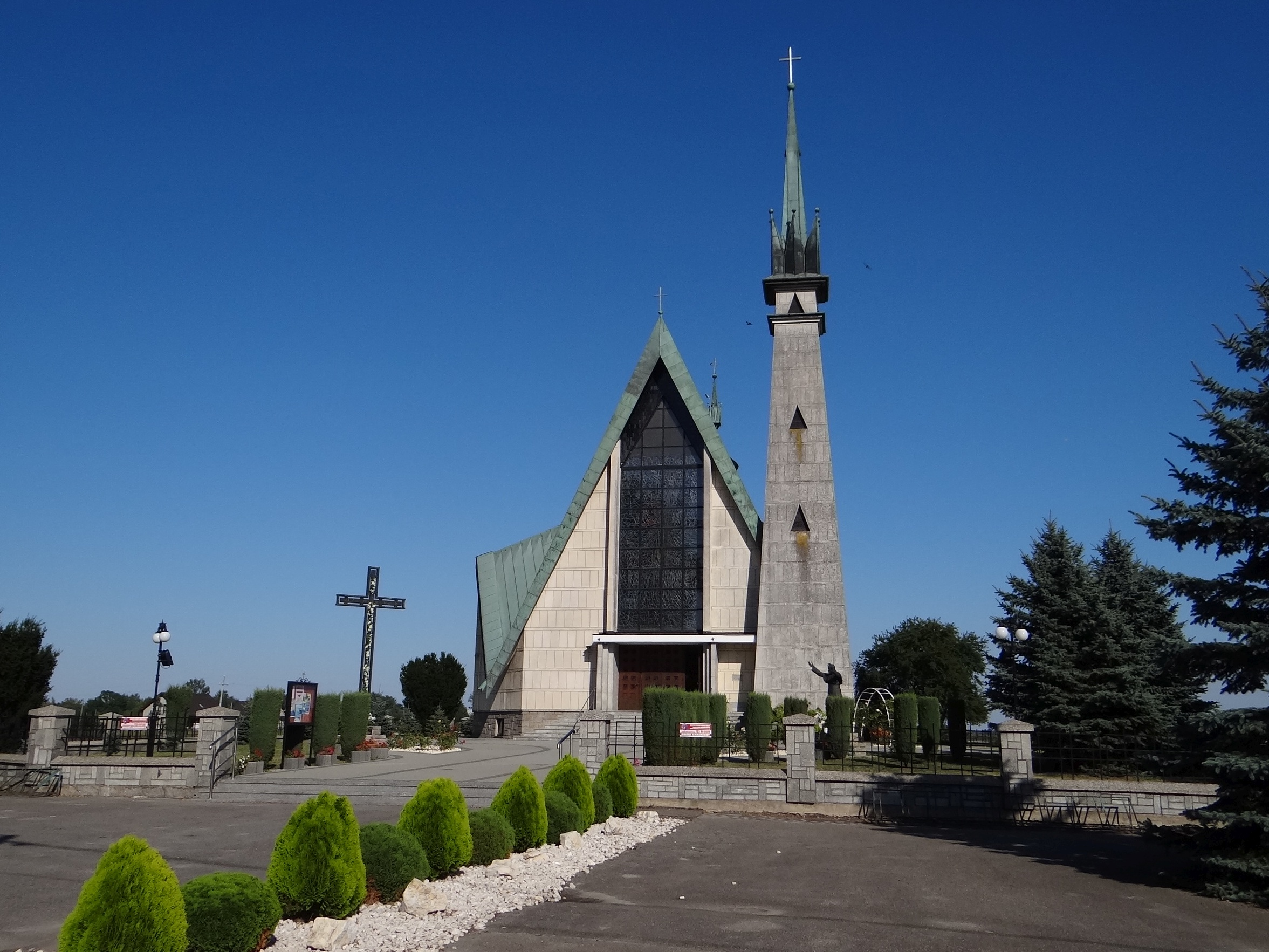
- Catholic church

- Location within Poland
- Coordinates: 50°9′N 20°37′E
- Country: Poland
- Voivodeship: Lesser Poland
- County: Brzesko
- Gmina: Szczurowa

Górka [ˈɡurka] is a village in the administrative district of Gmina Szczurowa, within Brzesko County, Lesser Poland Voivodeship, in southern Poland.
