= Dąbrówka Morska =

- Village
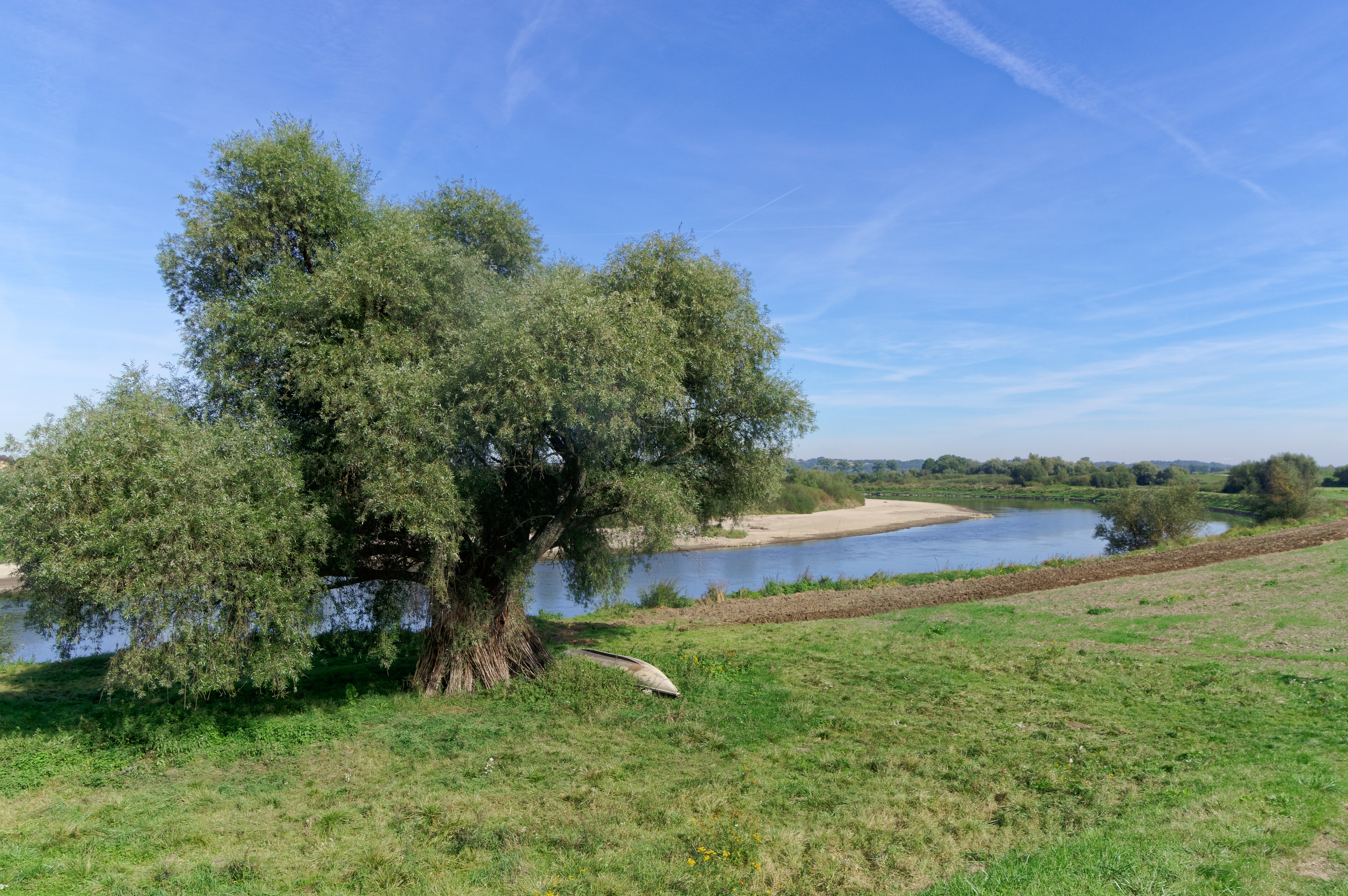
- Vistula in Dąbrówka Morska

- Location within Poland
- Coordinates: 50°8′N 20°34′E
- Country: Poland
- Voivodeship: Lesser Poland
- County: Brzesko
- Gmina: Szczurowa

Dąbrówka Morska [dɔmˈbrufka ˈmɔrska] is a small village in the administrative district of Gmina Szczurowa, within Brzesko County, Lesser Poland Voivodeship, in southern Poland.
