= Klimecki =

Klimecki is a Polish surname. Notable people with the surname include:

- Stanisław Klimecki (1883–1942), Mayor of Kraków
- Tadeusz Klimecki, Polish general
- Jan Klimecki, Polish boxer
