= Dobrociesz =

- Village
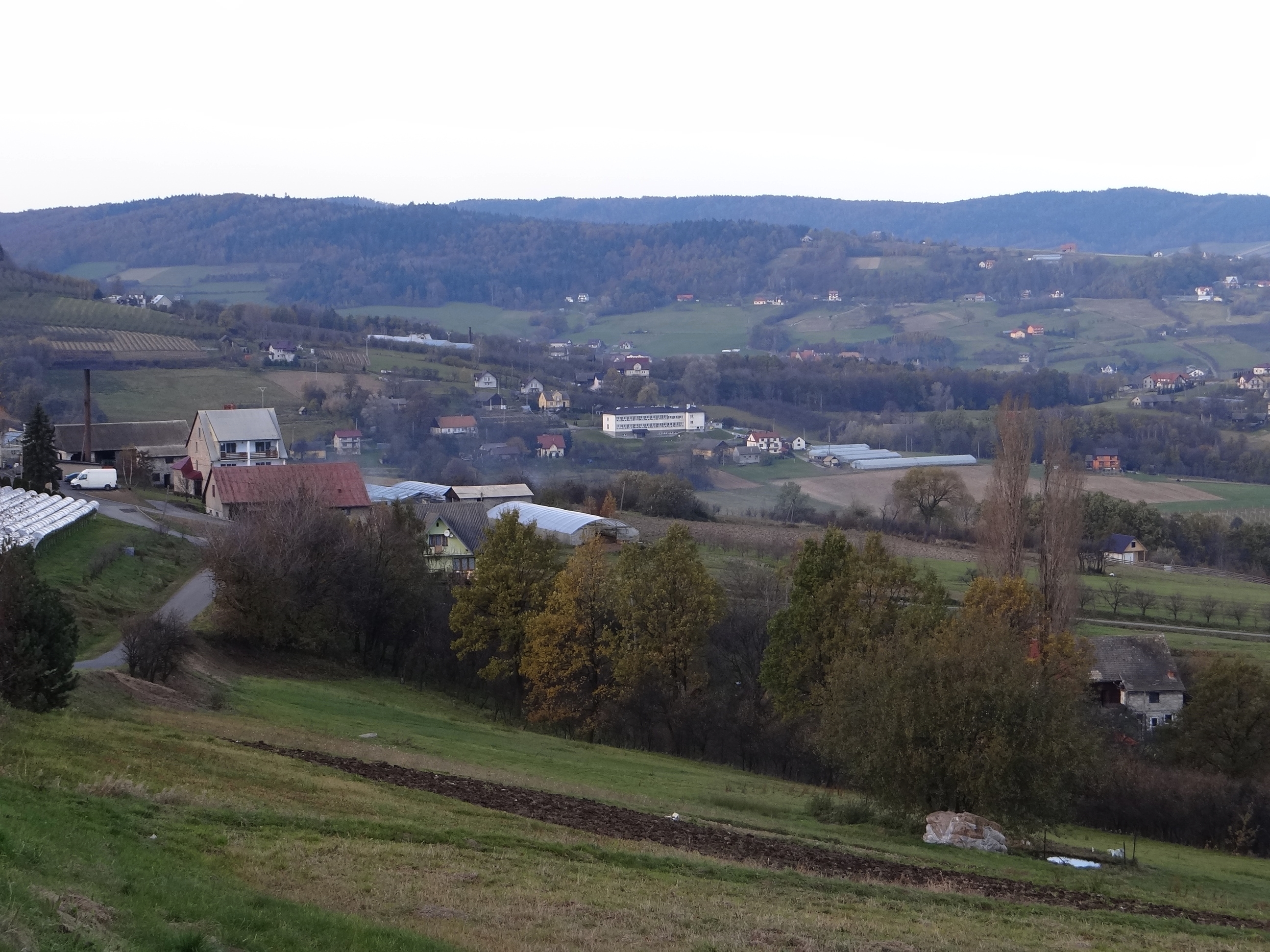

- Location within Poland
- Coordinates: 49°47′N 20°32′E
- Country: Poland
- Voivodeship: Lesser Poland
- County: Brzesko
- Gmina: Iwkowa
- Population: 2,000

Dobrociesz [dɔˈbrɔt͡ɕɛʂ] is a village in the administrative district of Gmina Iwkowa, within Brzesko County, Lesser Poland Voivodeship, in southern Poland.
