= Będzieszyna =

- Village
- Location within Poland
- Coordinates: 49°49′N 20°39′E
- Country: Poland
- Voivodeship: Lesser Poland
- County: Brzesko
- Gmina: Czchów

Będzieszyna [bɛnd͡ʑɛˈʂɨna] is a village in the administrative district of Gmina Czchów, within Brzesko County, Lesser Poland Voivodeship, in southern Poland.
