= Niedzieliska, Lesser Poland Voivodeship =

Niedzieliska
- Village
- Location within Poland
- Coordinates: 50°5′N 20°37′E
- Country: Poland
- Voivodeship: Lesser Poland
- County: Brzesko
- Gmina: Szczurowa

Niedzieliska [ɲɛd͡ʑɛˈliska] is a village in the administrative district of Gmina Szczurowa, within Brzesko County, Lesser Poland Voivodeship, in southern Poland.
