= Rudy-Rysie =

- Village
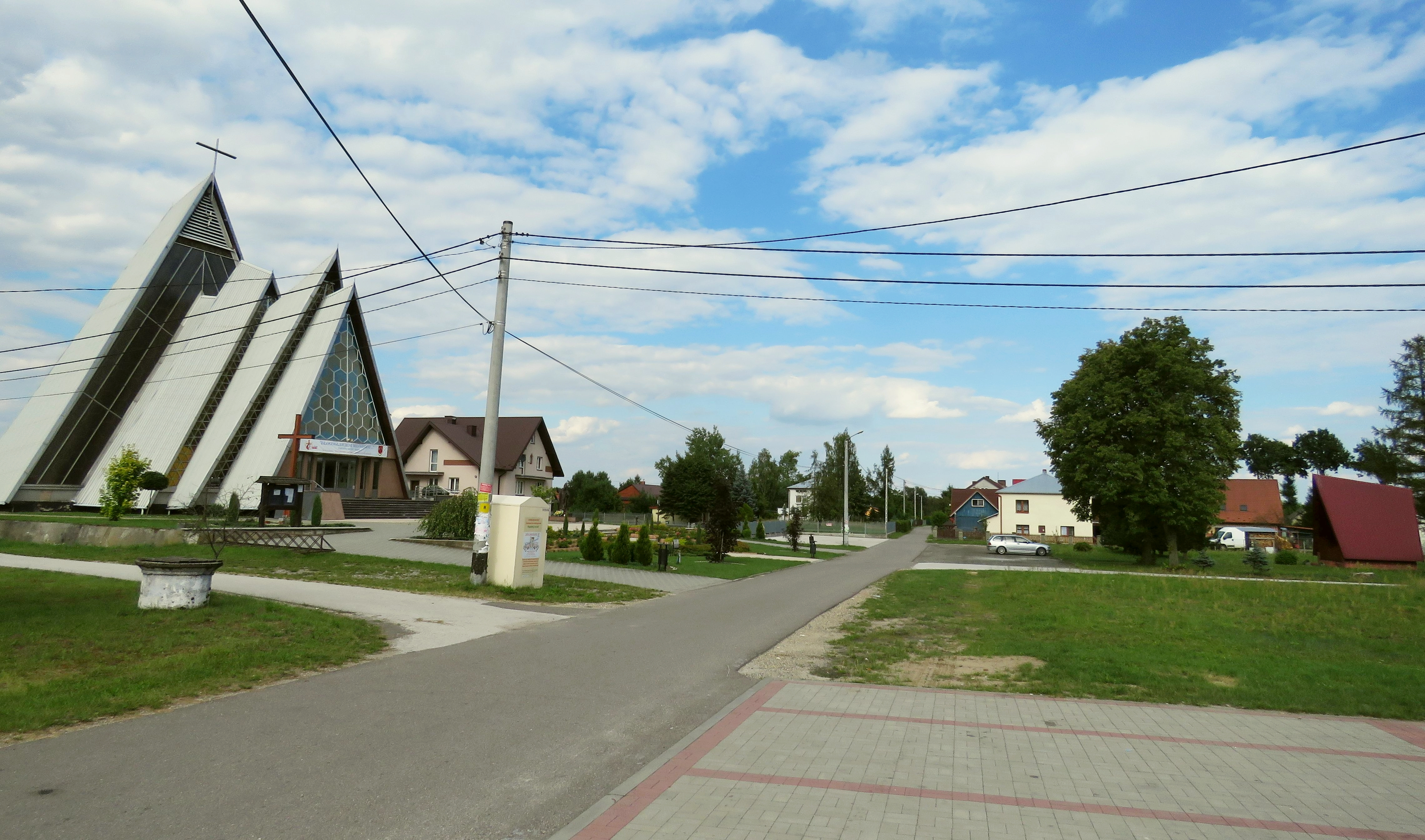

- Location within Poland
- Coordinates: 50°3′N 20°38′E
- Country: Poland
- Voivodeship: Lesser Poland
- County: Brzesko
- Gmina: Szczurowa
- Website: http://rudyrysie.w.interia.pl

Rudy-Rysie [ˈrudɨ ˈrɨɕɛ] is a village in the administrative district of Gmina Szczurowa, within Brzesko County, Lesser Poland Voivodeship, in southern Poland.
