= Uszew =

- Village
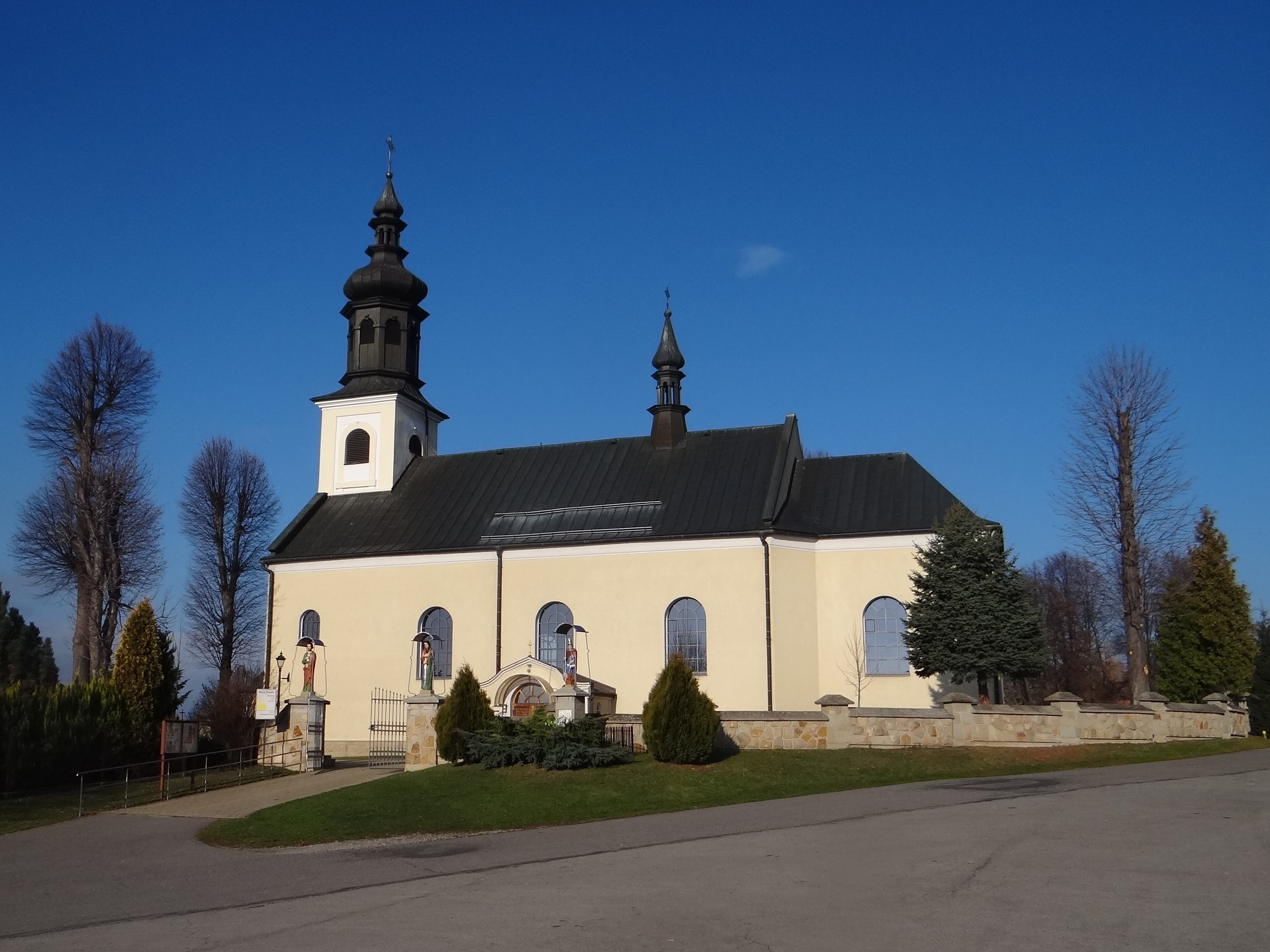
- Catholic church

- Location within Poland
- Coordinates: 49°54′N 20°36′E
- Country: Poland
- Voivodeship: Lesser Poland
- County: Brzesko
- Gmina: Gnojnik
- Population: 1,600

Uszew [ˈuʂɛf] is a village in the administrative district of Gmina Gnojnik, within Brzesko County, Lesser Poland Voivodeship, in southern Poland.
