= Złota, Lesser Poland Voivodeship =

Złota
- Village
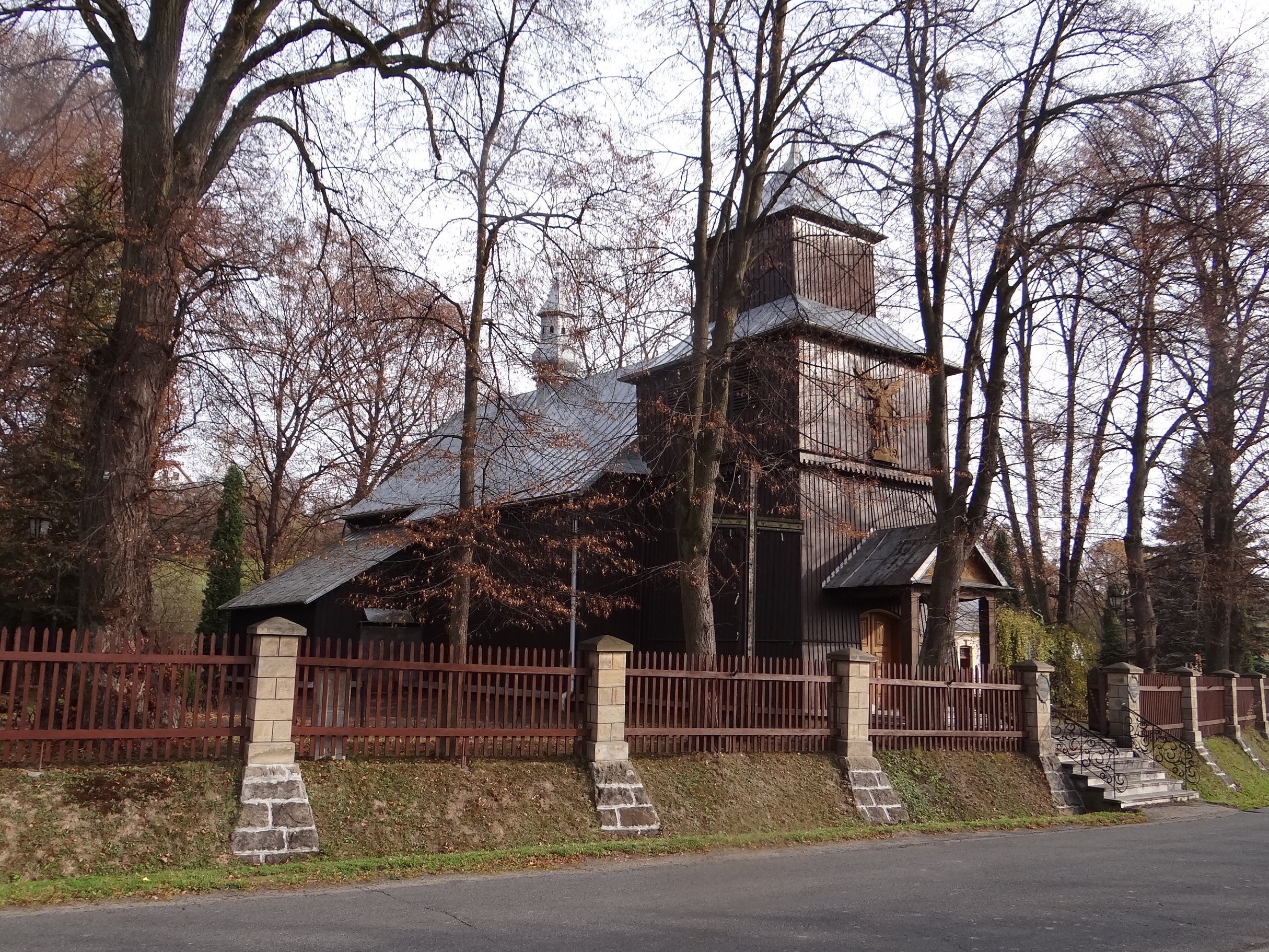
- Catholic church

- Location within Poland
- Coordinates: 49°52′35″N 20°41′51″E
- Country: Poland
- Voivodeship: Lesser Poland
- County: Brzesko
- Gmina: Czchów
- Population: 1,368

Złota [ˈzwɔta] is a village in the administrative district of Gmina Czchów, within Brzesko County, Lesser Poland Voivodeship, in southern Poland.
