= Wrzępia =

- Village
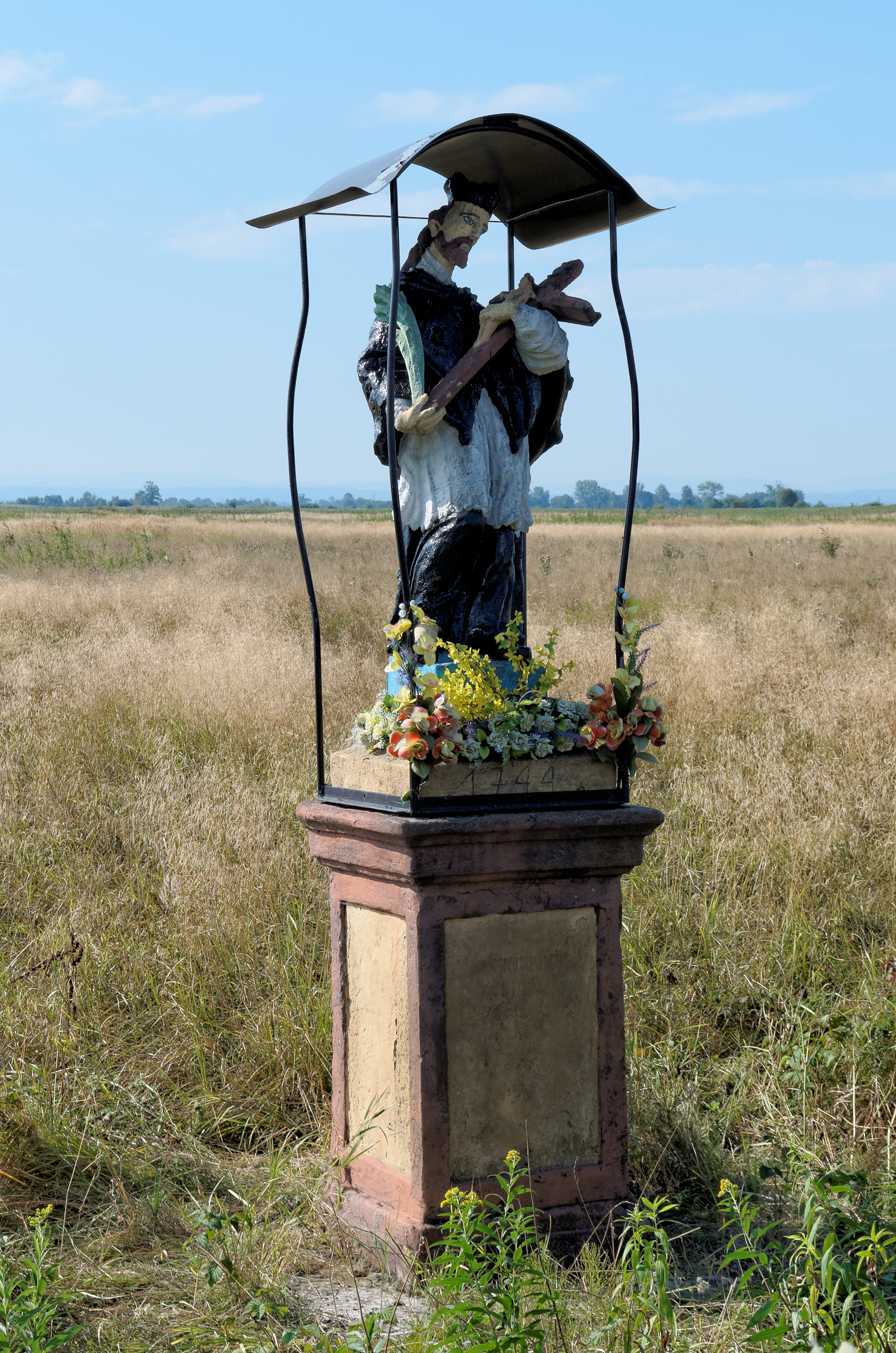

- Location within Poland
- Coordinates: 50°5′N 20°33′E
- Country: Poland
- Voivodeship: Lesser Poland
- County: Brzesko
- Gmina: Szczurowa

Wrzępia [ˈvʐɛmpja] is a village in the administrative district of Gmina Szczurowa, within Brzesko County, Lesser Poland Voivodeship, in southern Poland.
