= Kąty, Brzesko County =

Kąty
- Village
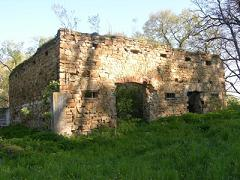
- Granary ruins

- Location within Poland
- Coordinates: 49°46′N 20°36′E
- Country: Poland
- Voivodeship: Lesser Poland
- County: Brzesko
- Gmina: Iwkowa

Kąty [ˈkɔntɨ] is a village in the administrative district of Gmina Iwkowa, within Brzesko County, Lesser Poland Voivodeship, in southern Poland.
