= Biesiadki =

Biesiadki refers to the following places in Poland:

- Biesiadki, Lesser Poland Voivodeship
- Biesiadki, Lublin Voivodeship
