= Zawada Uszewska =

- Village
- Location within Poland
- Coordinates: 49°54′N 20°37′E
- Country: Poland
- Voivodeship: Lesser Poland
- County: Brzesko
- Gmina: Gnojnik

Zawada Uszewska [zaˈvada uˈʂɛfska] is a village in the administrative district of Gmina Gnojnik, within Brzesko County, Lesser Poland Voivodeship, in southern Poland.
