= Dolega =

Dolega (in Polish Dołęga) may refer to:

== Places ==
- Dolega, Chiriquí, Panama
- Dołęga, Lesser Poland Voivodeship (south Poland)

== People ==
- Mycielski (Dołęga) (singular masculine), Mycielska (singular feminine), Mycielscy (plural), from a Polish noble family.
- Josh Dolega (born 1983), Australian politician
- Lucas Dolega (1978–2011), French/German photojournalist
- Marcin Dołęga (born 1982), Polish weightlifter
- Robert Dołęga (born 1977), Polish weightlifter
- Tadeusz Dołęga-Mostowicz (1898–1939), Polish writer, journalist and author

== Others ==
- Dołęga coat of arms, a Polish coat of arms
