= Porąbka Iwkowska =

- Village
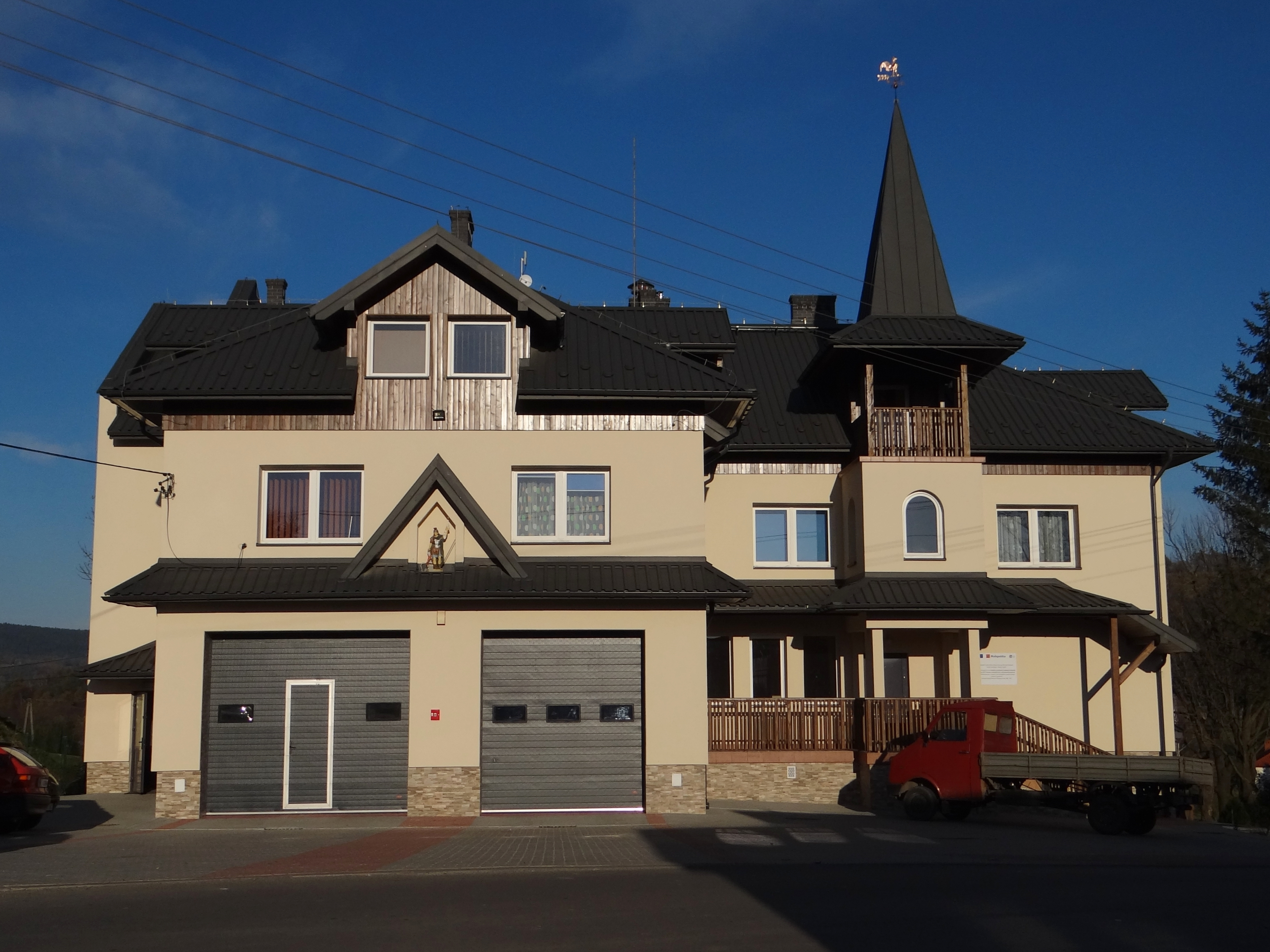
- Fire station

- Location within Poland
- Coordinates: 49°47′N 20°35′E
- Country: Poland
- Voivodeship: Lesser Poland
- County: Brzesko
- Gmina: Iwkowa

Porąbka Iwkowska [pɔˈrɔmpka ifˈkɔfska] is a village in the administrative district of Gmina Iwkowa, within Brzesko County, Lesser Poland Voivodeship, in southern Poland.
