= Żerków, Lesser Poland Voivodeship =

Żerków
- Village
- Location within Poland
- Coordinates: 49°53′N 20°40′E
- Country: Poland
- Voivodeship: Lesser Poland
- County: Brzesko
- Gmina: Gnojnik

Żerków [ˈʐɛrkuf] is a village in the administrative district of Gmina Gnojnik, within Brzesko County, Lesser Poland Voivodeship, in southern Poland.
