= Księże Kopacze =

- Village
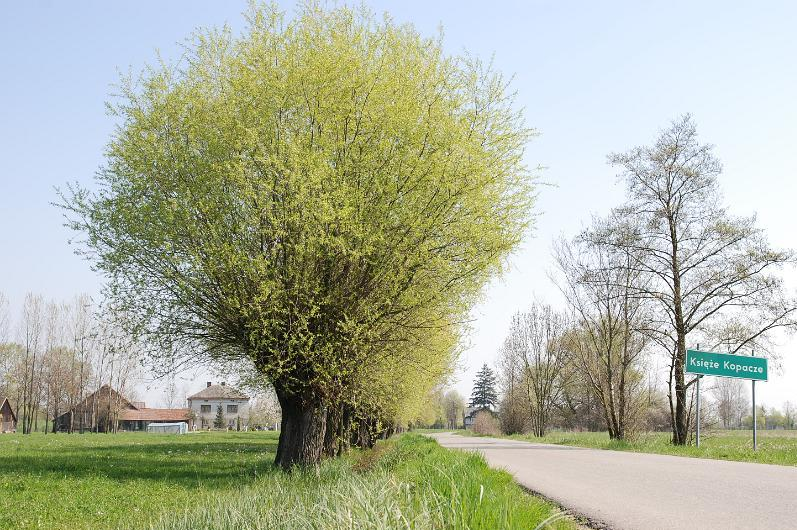

- Location within Poland
- Coordinates: 50°9′N 20°39′E
- Country: Poland
- Voivodeship: Lesser Poland
- County: Brzesko
- Gmina: Szczurowa
- Population: 54

Księże Kopacze [ˈkɕɛ̃ʐɛ kɔˈpat͡ʂɛ] is a village in the administrative district of Gmina Szczurowa, within Brzesko County, Lesser Poland Voivodeship, in southern Poland.
