= Piaski-Drużków =

- Village
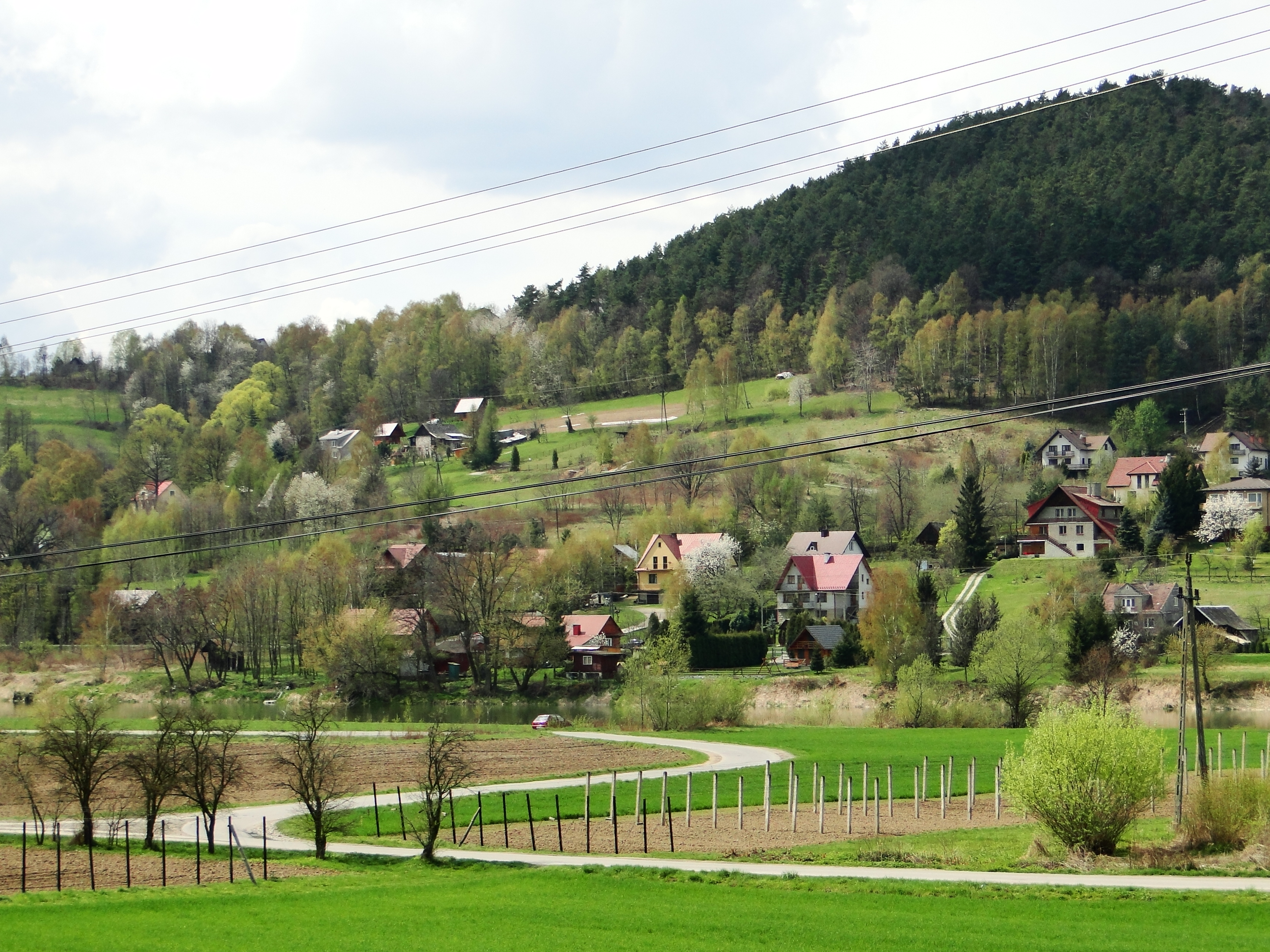

- Location within Poland
- Coordinates: 49°49′N 20°41′E
- Country: Poland
- Voivodeship: Lesser Poland
- County: Brzesko
- Gmina: Czchów

Piaski-Drużków (Polish pronunciation: [ˈpjaskʲi ˈdruʂkuf]) is a village in the administrative district of Gmina Czchów, within Brzesko County, Lesser Poland Voivodeship, in southern Poland.
