= Biskupice Melsztyńskie =

- Village
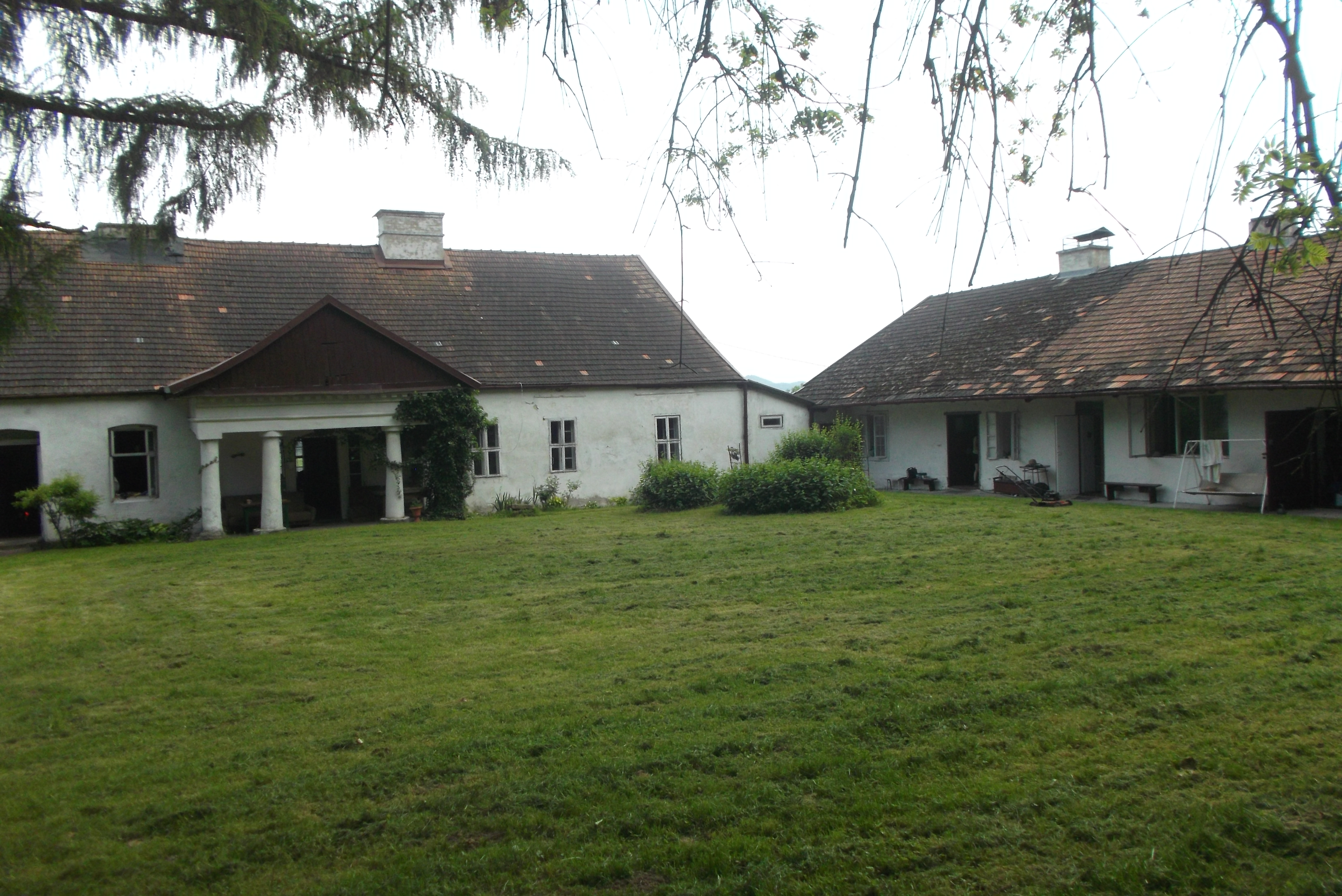

- Location within Poland
- Coordinates: 49°52′N 20°43′E
- Country: Poland
- Voivodeship: Lesser Poland
- County: Brzesko
- Gmina: Czchów

Biskupice Melsztyńskie [biskuˈpit͡sɛ mɛlʂˈtɨɲskʲɛ] is a village in the administrative district of Gmina Czchów, within Brzesko County, Lesser Poland Voivodeship, in southern Poland.
