= Uście Solne =

- Village
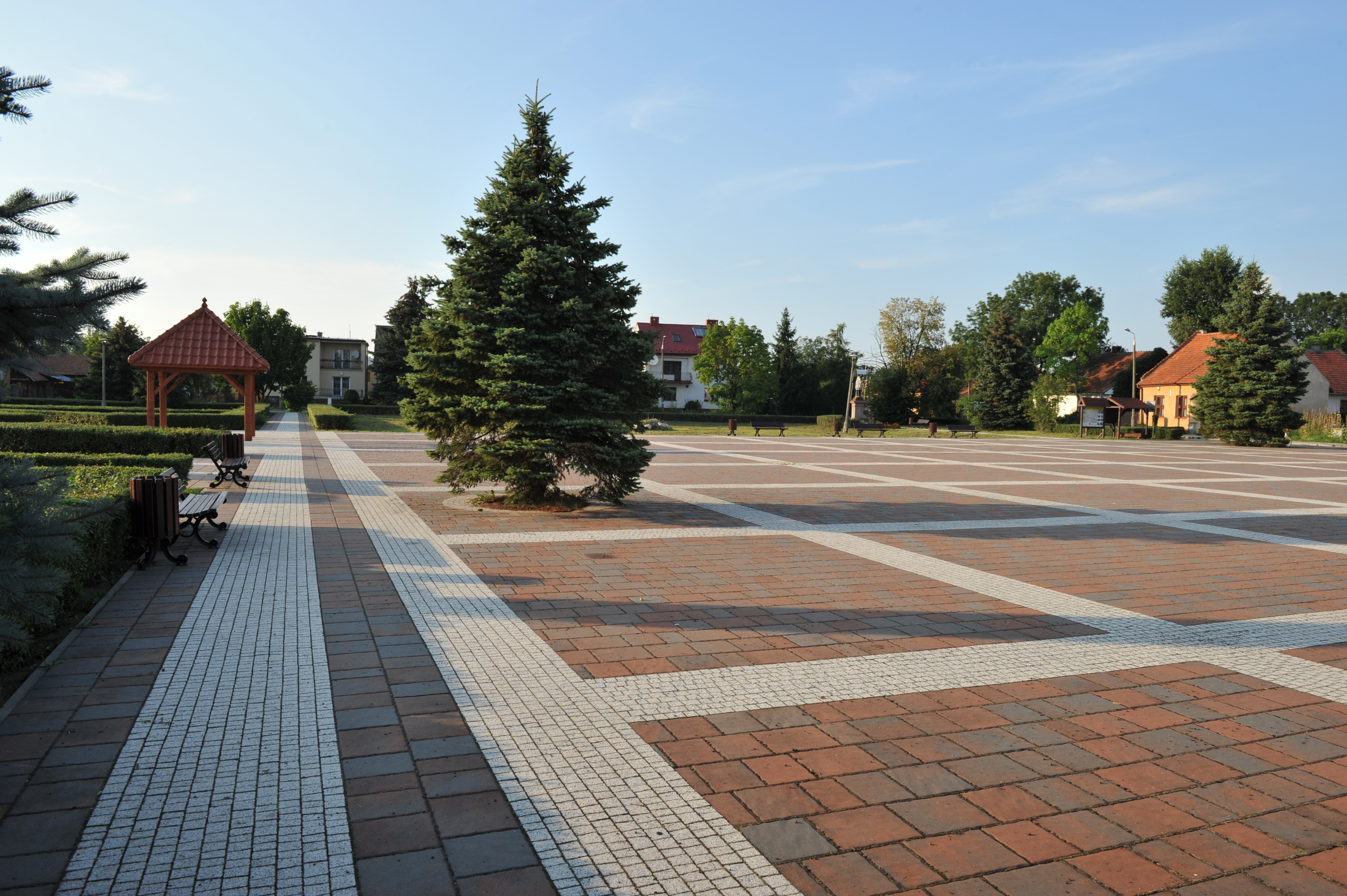

- Location within Poland
- Coordinates: 50°7′N 20°32′E
- Country: Poland
- Voivodeship: Lesser Poland
- County: Brzesko
- Gmina: Szczurowa
- Population: 950

Uście Solne [ˈuɕt͡ɕɛ ˈsɔlnɛ] is a village in the administrative district of Gmina Szczurowa, within Brzesko County, Lesser Poland Voivodeship, in southern Poland.

The name of the village is tied to its location, at the mouth of the Raba, where it flows into the Vistula (Polish word "ujście" or "uście" means "river mouth"). The adjective Solne refers to salt, as for centuries, the river port at Uście served salt mines from Bochnia. Uście Solne received town charter from King Kazimierz Wielki, on May 18, 1360. Most likely, however, it had been a town before that date, and Kazimierz Wielki only confirmed the already existing charter, changing it from obsolete Sroda Slaska rights to the more modern Magdeburg rights

After 1360, the new town of Uscie Uście was placed near Old Uście (Stare Uście), a village near the confluence of the Raba and the Vistula. Traces of earth fortification, which protected salt warehouses, are still visible. Uście Solne prospered in the second half of the 14th century, due to salt deposits, mined at Bochnia, and transported here along the Raba river. The town had a large medieval main square, as well as a town hall. Several residents of Uście Solne studied at Kraków's Jagiellonian University; three rectors of the university came from Uście (Stanislaw z Uścia Jakub Papenkowicz z Uścia, and Wojciech Papenkowicz).

Uście Solne remained a river port of local importance until the first partition of Poland (1772). Its slow decline, however, began during Swedish invasion of Poland (1655–1660), when it was completely burned. Annexed by the Habsburg Empire as part of Galicia, it quickly lost its importance after the Austrians built a new Vistula river port at nearby Swiniary. During World War I, heavy fighting between Russian and Austro-Hungarian forces took place here, and the village has a military cemetery nr. 319, located near parish cemetery. Uście Solne lost its town charter in 1934.
