= Rajsko =

Rajsko may refer to the following places:

- Rajsko, Greater Poland Voivodeship (east-central Poland)
- Rajsko, Brzesko County in Lesser Poland Voivodeship (south Poland)
- Rajsko, Oświęcim County in Lesser Poland Voivodeship (south Poland)
- Rajsko, part of the Swoszowice district of Kraków
- Rajsko, Silesian Voivodeship (south Poland)
- Rajsko, West Pomeranian Voivodeship (north-west Poland)
