= Gosprzydowa =

- Village
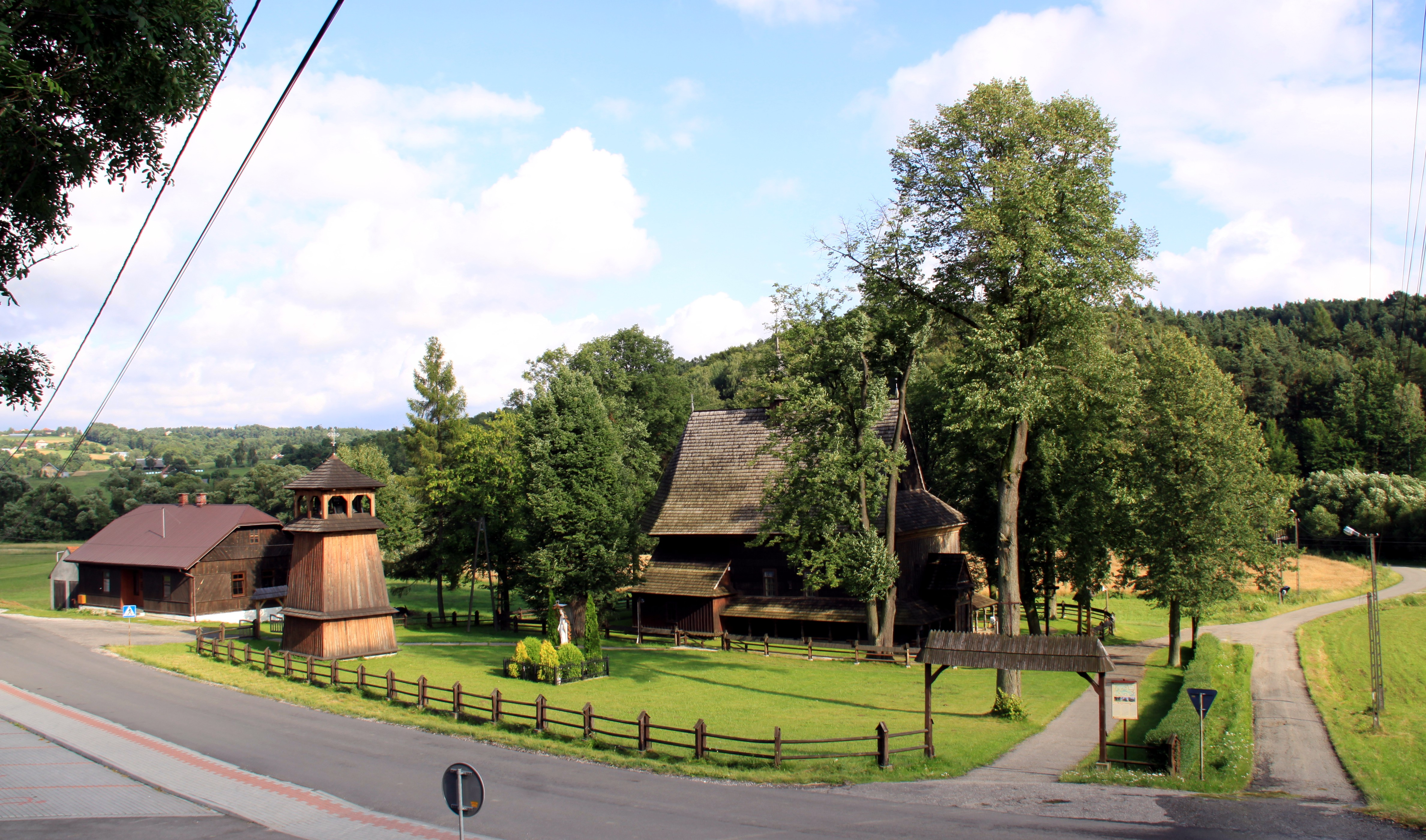
- Church, bell tower and old organist's house in Gosprzydowa

- Location within Poland
- Coordinates: 49°52′N 20°35′E
- Country: Poland
- Voivodeship: Lesser Poland
- County: Brzesko
- Gmina: Gnojnik

Gosprzydowa [ɡɔspʂɨˈdɔva] is a village in the administrative district of Gmina Gnojnik, within Brzesko County, Lesser Poland Voivodeship, in southern Poland.
