= Jurków, Brzesko County =

Jurków
- Village
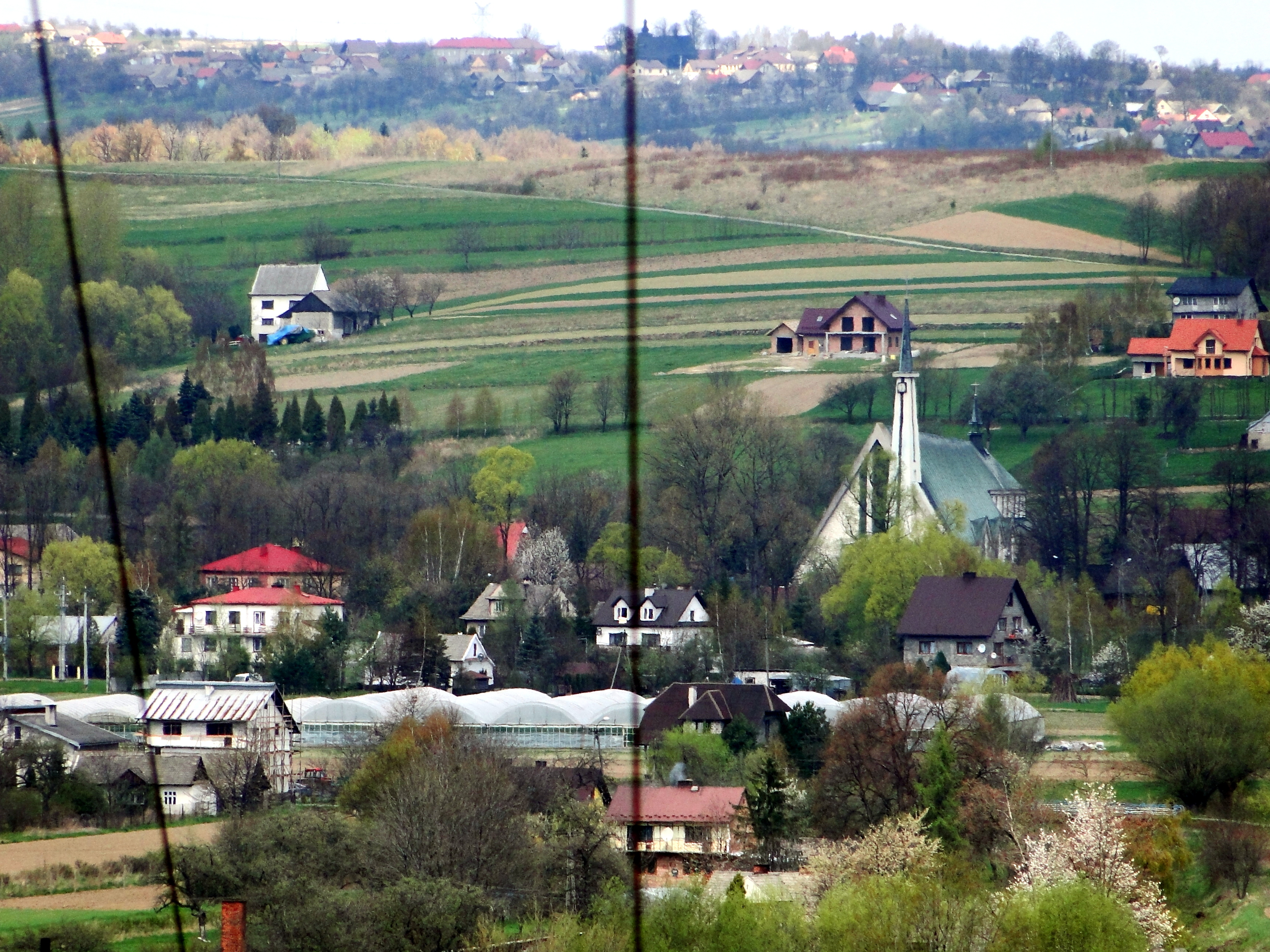

- Location within Poland
- Coordinates: 49°51′N 20°41′E
- Country: Poland
- Voivodeship: Lesser Poland
- County: Brzesko
- Gmina: Czchów
- Population: 1,234

Jurków [ˈjurkuf] is a village in the administrative district of Gmina Czchów, within Brzesko County, Lesser Poland Voivodeship, in southern Poland.

== Notable people ==
- Maria Kusion-Bibro (1936–1996), a sprinter
