= Strzelce Małe, Lesser Poland Voivodeship =

Strzelce Małe
- Village
- Location within Poland
- Coordinates: 50°7′N 20°35′E
- Country: Poland
- Voivodeship: Lesser Poland
- County: Brzesko
- Gmina: Szczurowa

Strzelce Małe [ˈstʂɛlt͡sɛ ˈmawɛ] is a village in the administrative district of Gmina Szczurowa, within Brzesko County, Lesser Poland Voivodeship, in southern Poland.
