= Strzelce Wielkie, Lesser Poland Voivodeship =

Strzelce Wielkie
- Village
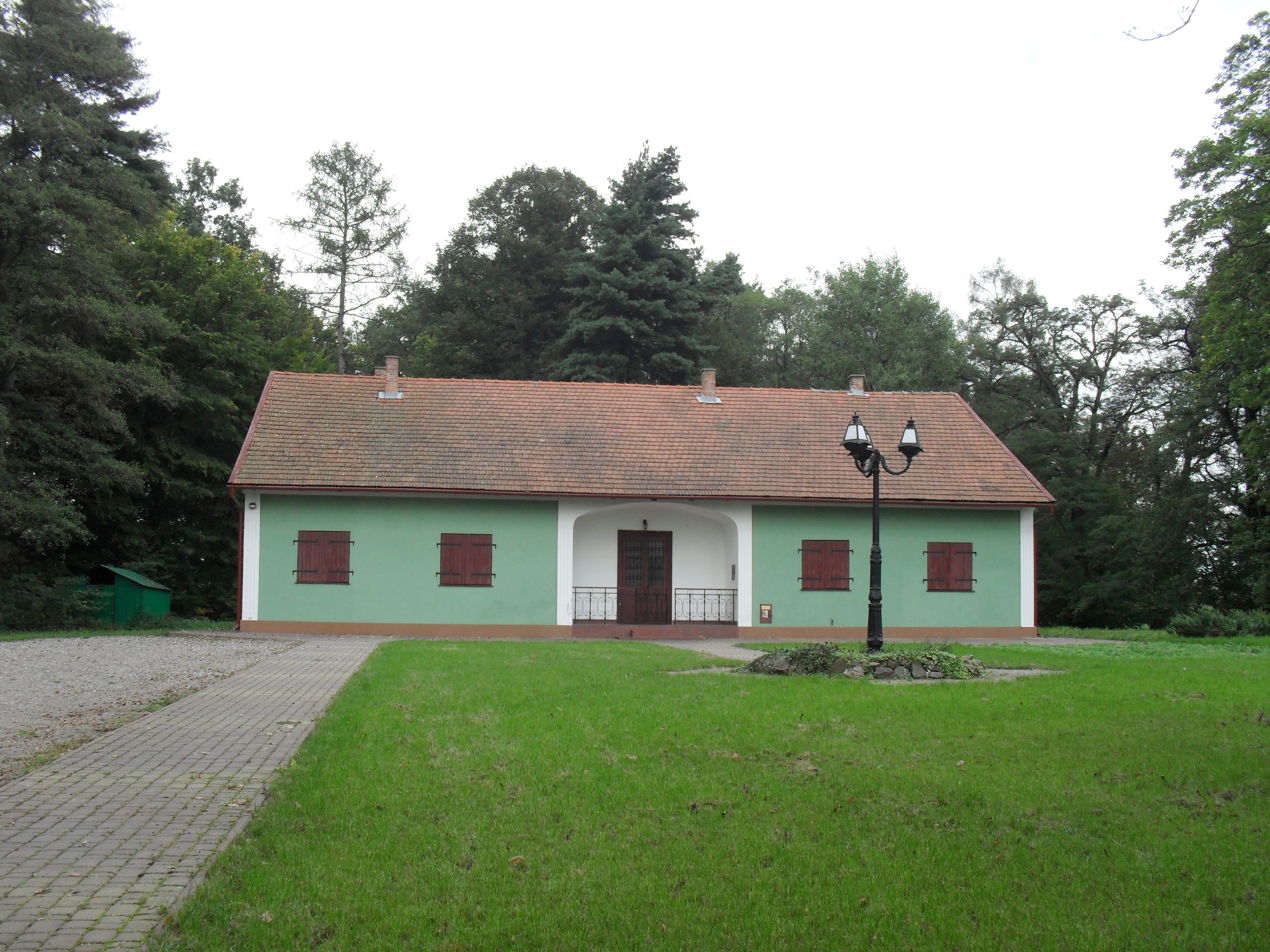
- Manor house

- Location within Poland
- Coordinates: 50°6′N 20°34′E
- Country: Poland
- Voivodeship: Lesser Poland
- County: Brzesko
- Gmina: Szczurowa

Strzelce Wielkie [ˈstʂɛlt͡sɛ ˈvjɛlkʲɛ] is a village in the administrative district of Gmina Szczurowa, within Brzesko County, Lesser Poland Voivodeship, in southern Poland.
