= Gmina Szczurowa =

Gmina Szczurowa Szczurowa Commune
- Gmina
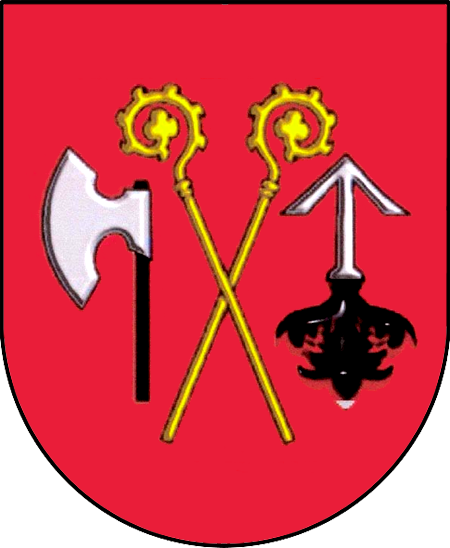
- Coat of arms
- Interactive map of Gmina Szczurowa
- Coordinates (Szczurowa): 50°7′N 20°39′E
- Country: Poland
- Voivodeship: Lesser Poland
- County: Brzesko
- Seat: Szczurowa

Area
  - Total: 134.64 km^{2} (51.98 sq mi)

Population (2006)
  - Total: 9,846
  - Density: 73.13/km^{2} (189.4/sq mi)
- Website: http://www.szczurowa.pl

Gmina Szczurowa is a rural gmina (administrative district) in Brzesko County, Lesser Poland Voivodeship, in southern Poland. Its seat is the village of Szczurowa, which lies approximately 17 kilometres (11 mi) north of Brzesko and 52 km (32 mi) east of the regional capital Kraków.

The gmina covers an area of 134.64 square kilometres (52.0 sq mi), and as of 2006 its total population is 9,846.

== Villages ==
Gmina Szczurowa contains the villages and settlements of Barczków, Dąbrówka Morska, Dołęga, Górka, Kopacze Wielkie, Księże Kopacze, Kwików, Niedzieliska, Pojawie, Popędzyna, Rajsko, Rudy-Rysie, Rylowa, Rząchowa, Strzelce Małe, Strzelce Wielkie, Szczurowa, Uście Solne, Wola Przemykowska, Wrzępia and Zaborów.

== Neighbouring gminas ==
Gmina Szczurowa is bordered by the gminas of Bochnia, Borzęcin, Brzesko, Drwinia, Koszyce, Radłów, Rzezawa and Wietrzychowice.
