= Rajsko, Brzesko County =

Rajsko
- Village
- Location within Poland
- Coordinates: 50°6′20″N 20°36′0″E
- Country: Poland
- Voivodeship: Lesser Poland
- County: Brzesko
- Gmina: Szczurowa

Rajsko [ˈrai̯skɔ] is a village in the administrative district of Gmina Szczurowa, within Brzesko County, Lesser Poland Voivodeship, in southern Poland.
