= Gmina Gnojnik =

Gmina Gnojnik Gnojnik Commune
- Gmina
- Coat of arms
- Interactive map of Gmina Gnojnik
- Coordinates (Gnojnik): 49°53′N 20°36′E
- Country: Poland
- Voivodeship: Lesser Poland
- County: Brzesko
- Seat: Gnojnik

Area
  - Total: 54.89 km^{2} (21.19 sq mi)

Population (2006)
  - Total: 7,336
  - Density: 133.6/km^{2} (346.1/sq mi)
- Website: https://web.archive.org/web/20071225220636/http://www.gnojnik.ug.pl/

Gmina Gnojnik is a rural gmina (administrative district) in Brzesko County, Lesser Poland Voivodeship, in southern Poland. Its seat is the village of Gnojnik, which lies approximately 10 kilometres (6 mi) south of Brzesko and 52 km (32 mi) south-east of the regional capital Kraków.

The gmina covers an area of 54.89 square kilometres (21.2 sq mi), and as of 2006 its total population is 7,336.

== Villages ==
Gmina Gnojnik contains the villages and settlements of Biesiadki, Gnojnik, Gosprzydowa, Lewniowa, Uszew, Zawada Uszewska and Żerków.

== Neighbouring gminas ==
Gmina Gnojnik is bordered by the gminas of Brzesko, Czchów, Dębno, Lipnica Murowana and Nowy Wiśnicz.
