= Gmina Iwkowa =

Gmina Iwkowa Iwkowa Commune
- Gmina
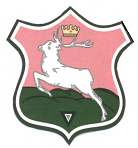
- Coat of arms
- Interactive map of Gmina Iwkowa
- Coordinates (Iwkowa): 49°49′N 20°34′E
- Country: Poland
- Voivodeship: Lesser Poland
- County: Brzesko
- Seat: Iwkowa

Area
  - Total: 47.19 km^{2} (18.22 sq mi)

Population (2006)
  - Total: 6,061
  - Density: 128.4/km^{2} (332.7/sq mi)
- Website: http://www.iwkowa.pl

Gmina Iwkowa is a rural gmina (administrative district) in Brzesko County, Lesser Poland Voivodeship, in southern Poland. Its seat is the village of Iwkowa, which lies approximately 18 kilometres (11 mi) south of Brzesko and 53 km (33 mi) south-east of the regional capital Kraków.

The gmina covers an area of 47.19 square kilometres (18.2 sq mi), and as of 2006 its total population is 6,061.

== Villages ==
Gmina Iwkowa contains the villages and settlements of Dobrociesz, Drużków Pusty, Iwkowa, Kąty, Połom Mały, Porąbka Iwkowska and Wojakowa.

== Neighbouring communes ==
Gmina Iwkowa is bordered by the gminas of Czchów, Laskowa, Lipnica Murowana and Łososina Dolna.
