= Tymowa, Lesser Poland Voivodeship =

Tymowa
- Village
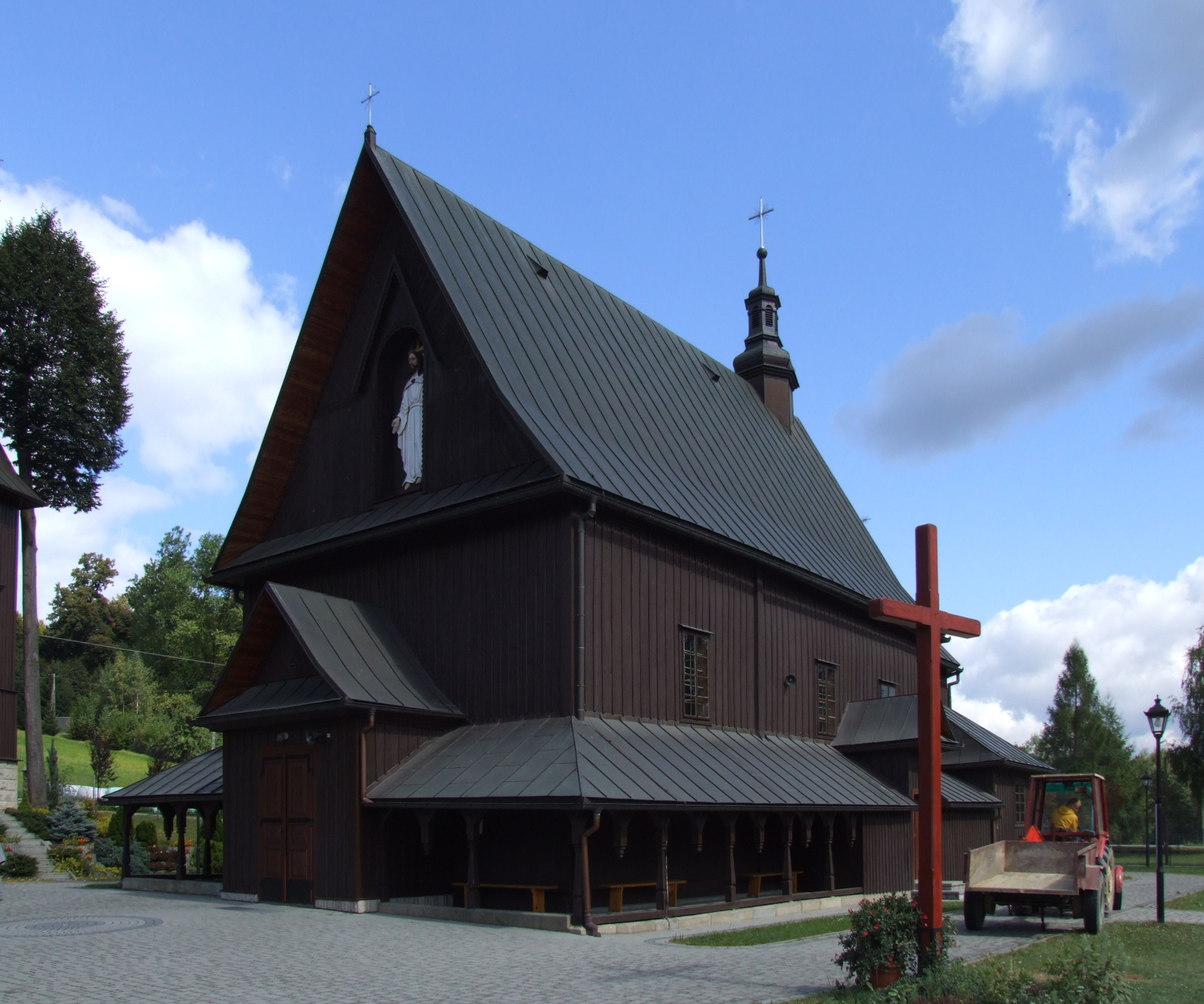
- Wooden church in Tymowa

- Location within Poland
- Coordinates: 49°51′N 20°38′E
- Country: Poland
- Voivodeship: Lesser Poland
- County: Brzesko
- Gmina: Czchów

Tymowa [tɨˈmɔva] is a village in the administrative district of Gmina Czchów, within Brzesko County, Lesser Poland Voivodeship, in southern Poland.
