= Szczurowa =

- Village
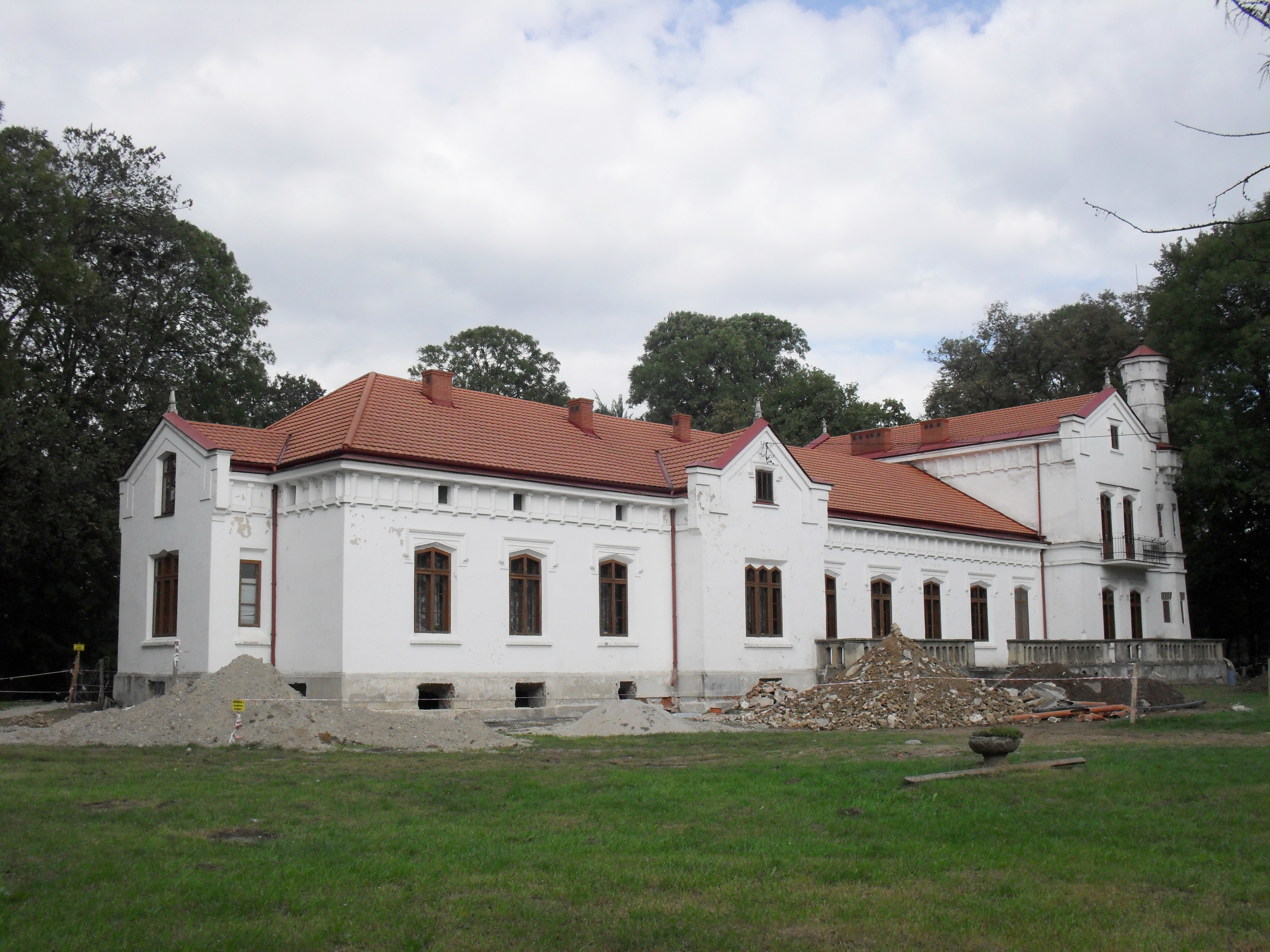
- Manor house

- Location within Poland
- Coordinates: 50°07′08″N 20°38′15″E
- Country: Poland
- Voivodeship: Lesser Poland
- County: Brzesko
- Gmina: Szczurowa
- Population: 1,800

Szczurowa [ʂt͡ʂuˈrɔva] is a village in Brzesko County, Lesser Poland Voivodeship, in southern Poland. It is the seat of the gmina (administrative district) called Gmina Szczurowa.

== People ==
- Jan Piotrowski (b. 1953), Roman catholic bishop

== See also ==
- Szczurowa massacre
