= Stanisław Klimecki =

Polish politician

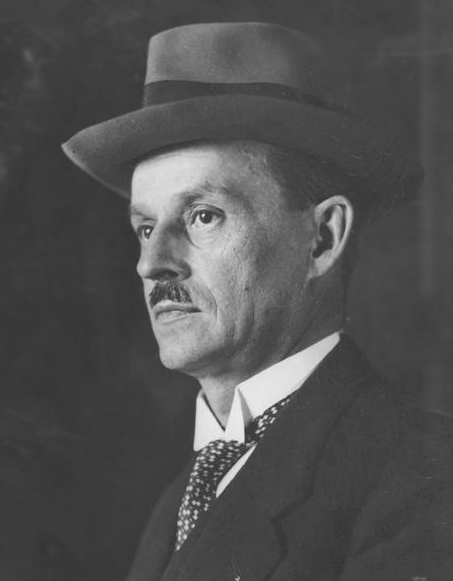
- Born: November 20, 1883; Wola Przemykowska
- Died: December 11, 1942 (aged 59); Kraków
- Occupation: Lawyer
- Known for: President of Kraków

Stanisław Klimecki (November 20, 1883 – December 11, 1942) was a Polish lawyer, social activist, and the President of Kraków at the time of the German invasion of Poland in September 1939. He served as president only for a few weeks, before his German successor from the NSDAP took over by the order of SS-Obergruppenführer, Hans Frank. Klimecki saved the city from being shelled by the invading Wehrmacht troops on his own initiative.

Klimecki was arrested and then released numerous times during the occupation of Kraków, before his death at the hands of the Nazis. The first time, he was taken hostage by the Wehrmacht on September 6, 1939, when he approached them with the call to stop shooting because the city was defenseless: "Feuer einstellen!" The second time, if only briefly – on September 11, 1939, for interrogation; and then once more on September 20, 1939 (with ten-day detention), when he was dismissed as president. On November 6, 1939, Klimecki was arrested again, during the notorious Sonderaktion Krakau, and sent to Sachsenhausen concentration camp. He returned to Kraków upon his release, and was apprehended for the last time of his life on November 29, 1942. A few days later, on December 11, 1942, he was executed, along with some 40 hostages at a remote killing ground in the Niepołomice Forest.

== Biography ==
Klimecki was born in Wola Przemykowska near Brzesko, the son of Edmund Klimecki and Rozalia née Wróblewska. He went to school first in Złoczów, then in Wadowice, Bochnia, and graduated from high school in the Podgórze district of Kraków in 1904. He studied law at the University of Vienna, and after his return he earned a doctorate at Jagiellonian University (UJ) in 1913. During World War I, Klimecki fought with the Second Brigade of the Polish Legions. In 1918, he took part in the disarming of Austrian soldiers in Kraków; he left the army in June 1919, with the rank of Reserve Captain.

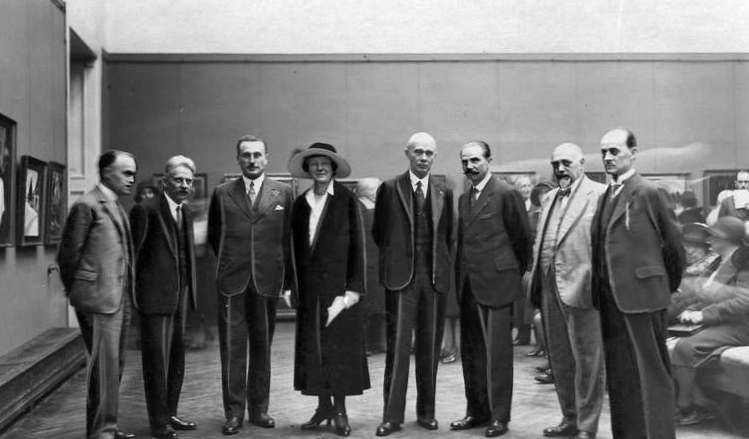
The 1931 art opening at the Palace of Fine Arts, Kraków. From right to left: Stanisław Klimecki, Witold Ostrowski (then vice-president of Kraków), President Władysław Belina-Prażmowski, and the Governor Mikołaj Kwaśniewski.

From 1919, Klimecki ran a law firm in Podgórze in sovereign Poland. In 1926, he was elected as member of the Kraków City Council; and on July 9, 1931, became vice-president of the city. He was involved in social services, health care, public parks, as well as the distribution of the city's gas. Following the resignation of President Mieczysław Kaplicki in February 1939, Klimecki served as interim president until the appointment of Bolesław Czuchajowski in May 1939, by the minister of internal affairs.

== World War II ==
Three days after the German invasion of Poland, on September 3, 1939, President Czuchajowski hastily departed Kraków. The City Council gave his vacant position to Klimecki. On his own initiative, Klimecki went to meet the invading Wehrmacht troops on September 6, 1939, and offered himself as a hostage. In this way, he protected the residents of the city from German attack.

After the German takeover of Kraków, Stanisław Klimecki – as the sole representative of the Polish authorities – decided to create an emergency Committee that would launch the new school year at all levels. He entrusted the task of organizing the new board to the Rector of Jagiellonian University, Tadeusz Lehr-Spławiński, who set it up by September 9, 1939. The new office headquarters were located at the administrative centre of the Collegium Novum building, where the registration of teachers and students took place in the following weeks. By September 20, 1939, nearly 20,000 students of all types and about 650 teachers and educators signed up. By the end of September, most schools began teaching. However, on September 20, 1939, Klimecki was arrested by the Gestapo again for the second time in two weeks (after his first brief arrest on September 11), and fired as president, along with the entire City Council. He was replaced as head of the municipal government by Ernst Emil Zörner from the NSDAP, who arrived from Dresden. Klimecki was released from prison at Montelupich street ten days later.

=== Sonderaktion Krakau ===
A little over two months after the invasion, SS-Obersturmbannführer Bruno Müller, the newly appointed chief of the Gestapo in Kraków, called a meeting of all university professors and academics at the Collegium Novum. He informed them that the Poles did not have permission from the German authorities to start a new school year. They were arrested on the spot, as part of an integrated action plan known as Sonderaktion Krakau. Klimecki was apprehended at his home at 5 pm the same evening. Within days, they were deported in one rail car – 184 persons in all – to Reichsgau Wartheland and soon imprisoned at Sachsenhausen concentration camp near Berlin. Klimecki spent over three months there during the winter.

Thanks to an international protest by prominent Italians, including Benito Mussolini and the Vatican, 101 professors from Kraków universities who were older than 40 were released from the camp on February 8, 1940. Klimecki was released with them. The German authorities allowed only the operation of elementary schools during the occupation.

After his return to Kraków in February 1940, Stanisław Klimecki worked for two years as a lawyer, and witnessed the German looting of the city. He was again arrested by the Gestapo, for the last time in his life, on the night of November 28–29, 1942. Two weeks later, on December 11, 1942, he was executed and his body thrown into a mass grave along with some 40 Polish hostages in the remote Niepołomice Forest. A street in Podgórze District of Kraków is named after him.
