= Iwkowa =

- Village
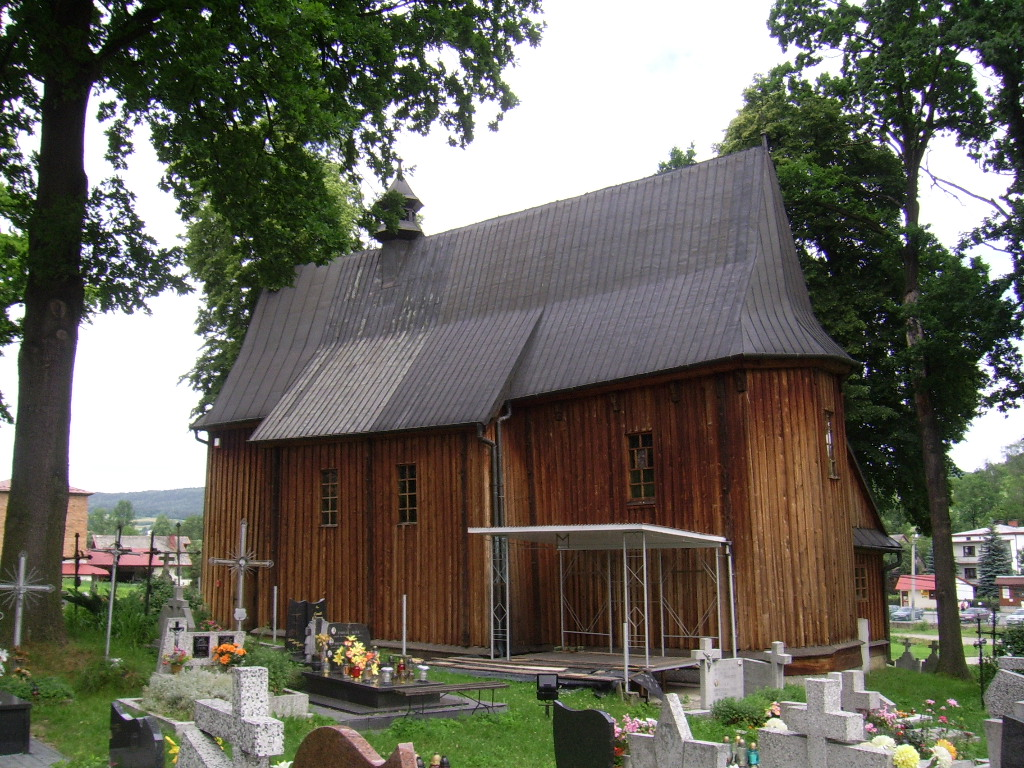
- St. Mary's church, 15th-17th century

- Location within Poland
- Coordinates: 49°49′N 20°34′E
- Voivodeship: Lesser Poland
- County: Brzesko
- Gmina: Iwkowa
- Population: 2,699

Iwkowa [ifˈkɔva] is a village in Brzesko County, Lesser Poland Voivodeship, in southern Poland. It is the seat of the gmina (administrative district) called Gmina Iwkowa.

== History ==
The settlement in the territory of the present village Iwkowa dates back to the Neolithic period, i.e., the Stone Age (c. 4000–1700 years BCE), when the first agricultural population appeared leading a sedentary life.
