= Gnojnik =

- Village
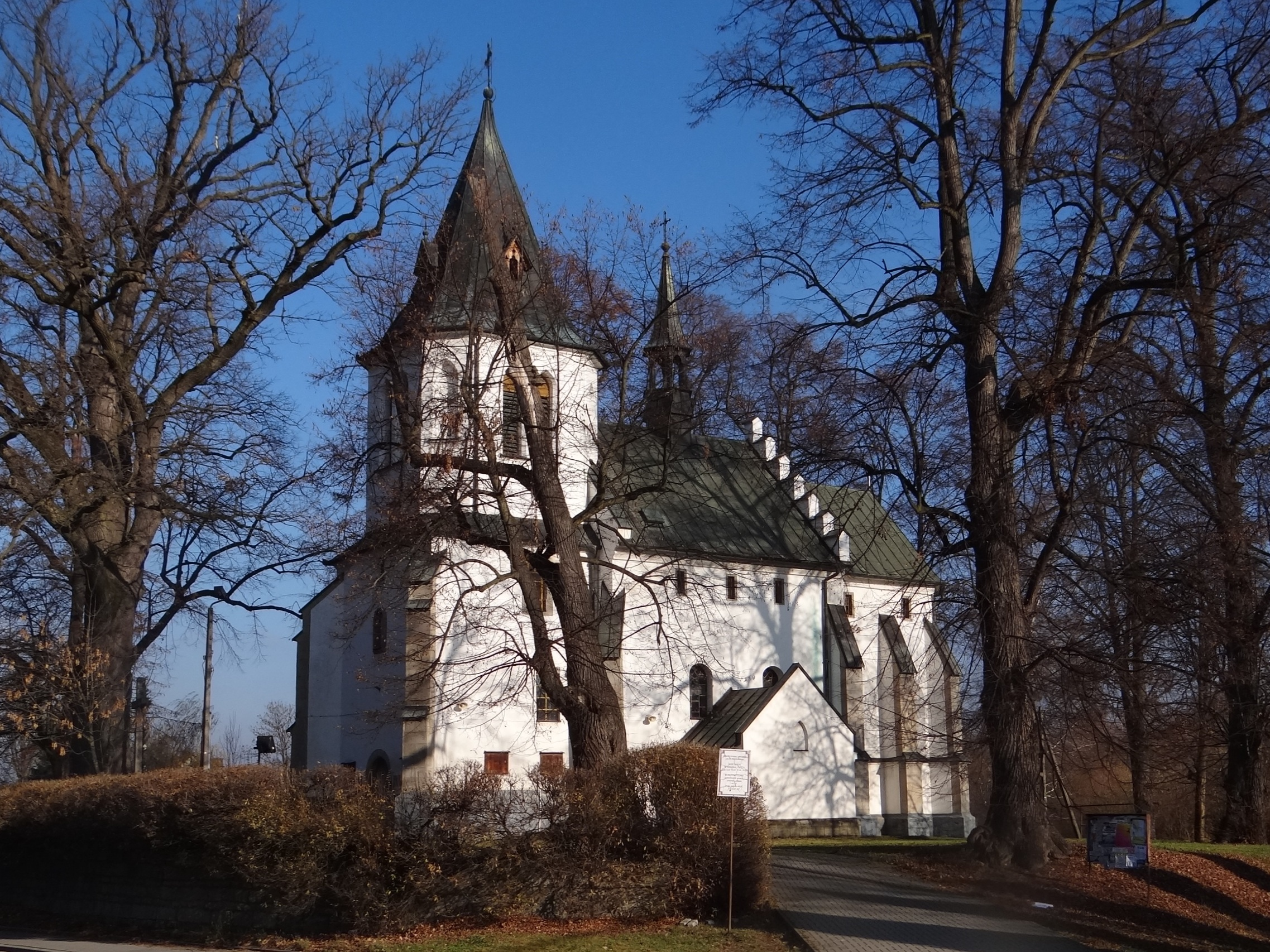
- Church of Saint Martin

- Location within Poland
- Coordinates: 49°53′N 20°36′E
- Country: Poland
- Voivodeship: Lesser Poland
- County: Brzesko
- Gmina: Gnojnik

Gnojnik [ˈɡnɔi̯nik] is a village in southern Poland, the seat of the rural gmina (administrative district) of Gmina Gnojnik in Brzesko County, Lesser Poland Voivodeship.
