= Gmina Czchów =

Gmina Czchów Czchów Commune
- Gmina
- Coat of arms
- Interactive map of Gmina Czchów
- Coordinates (Czchów): 49°51′N 20°41′E
- Country: Poland
- Voivodeship: Lesser Poland
- County: Brzesko
- Seat: Czchów

Area
  - Total: 66.47 km^{2} (25.66 sq mi)

Population (2006)
  - Total: 9,195
  - Density: 138.3/km^{2} (358.3/sq mi)
  - Urban: 2,207
  - Rural: 6,988
- Website: https://www.czchow.pl/

Gmina Czchów is an urban-rural gmina (administrative district) in Brzesko County, Lesser Poland Voivodeship, in southern Poland. Its seat is the town of Czchów, which lies approximately 14 kilometres (9 mi) south of Brzesko and 59 km (37 mi) south-east of the regional capital Kraków.

The gmina covers an area of 66.47 square kilometres (25.7 sq mi), and as of 2006 its total population is 9,195 (out of which the population of Czchów amounts to 2,207, and the population of the rural part of the gmina is 6,988).

The gmina contains part of the protected area called Ciężkowice-Rożnów Landscape Park.

== Villages ==
Apart from the town of Czchów, Gmina Czchów contains the villages and settlements of Będzieszyna, Biskupice Melsztyńskie, Domosławice, Jurków, Piaski-Drużków, Tworkowa, Tymowa, Wytrzyszczka and Złota.

== Neighbouring gminas ==
Gmina Czchów is bordered by the gminas of Dębno, Gnojnik, Gródek nad Dunajcem, Iwkowa, Lipnica Murowana, Łososina Dolna and Zakliczyn.
