= Brzesko County =

Brzesko County Powiat brzeski
- County
- Flag Coat of arms

- Location within the voivodeship
- Coordinates (Brzesko): 49°58′N 20°37′E
- Country: Poland
- Voivodeship: Lesser Poland
- Seat: Brzesko
- Gminas: Total 7: Gmina Borzęcin; Gmina Brzesko; Gmina Czchów; Gmina Dębno; Gmina Gnojnik; Gmina Iwkowa; Gmina Szczurowa

Area
  - Total: 590 km^{2} (230 sq mi)

Population (2019)
  - Total: 93,139
  - Density: 160/km^{2} (410/sq mi)
  - Urban: 19,137
  - Rural: 74,002
- Car plates: KBR
- Website: web.archive.org/web/20141218185546/http://powiatbrzeski.com.pl/

Brzesko County (Polish: powiat brzeski) is a unit of territorial administration and local government (powiat) in Lesser Poland Voivodeship, southern Poland. It came into being on January 1, 1999, as a result of the Polish local government reforms passed in 1998. Its administrative seat and largest town is Brzesko, which lies 50 kilometres (31 mi) east of the regional capital Kraków. The only other town in the county is Czchów, lying 14 km (9 mi) south of Brzesko.

The county covers an area of 590 square kilometres (227.8 sq mi). As of 2019 its total population is 93,139, out of which the population of Brzesko is 16,792, that of Czchów is 2,345, and the rural population is 74,002.

== Neighbouring counties ==
Brzesko County is bordered by Tarnów County to the east, Nowy Sącz County and Limanowa County to the south, Bochnia County to the west, and Proszowice County to the north-west.

== Administrative division ==
The county is subdivided into seven gminas (two urban-rural and five rural). These are listed in the following table, in descending order of population.

Gmina	Type	Area (km^{2})	Population (2019)	Seat
Gmina Brzesko	urban-rural	102.6	36,275	Brzesko
Gmina Dębno	rural	81.5	14,709	Dębno
Gmina Czchów	urban-rural	66.5	9,816	Czchów
Gmina Szczurowa	rural	134.6	9,521	Szczurowa
Gmina Borzęcin	rural	102.7	8,351	Borzęcin
Gmina Gnojnik	rural	54.9	8,016	Gnojnik
Gmina Iwkowa	rural	47.2	6,451	Iwkowa
