= Roma Holocaust Memorial Day =

Day commemorating the victims of the Romani genocide

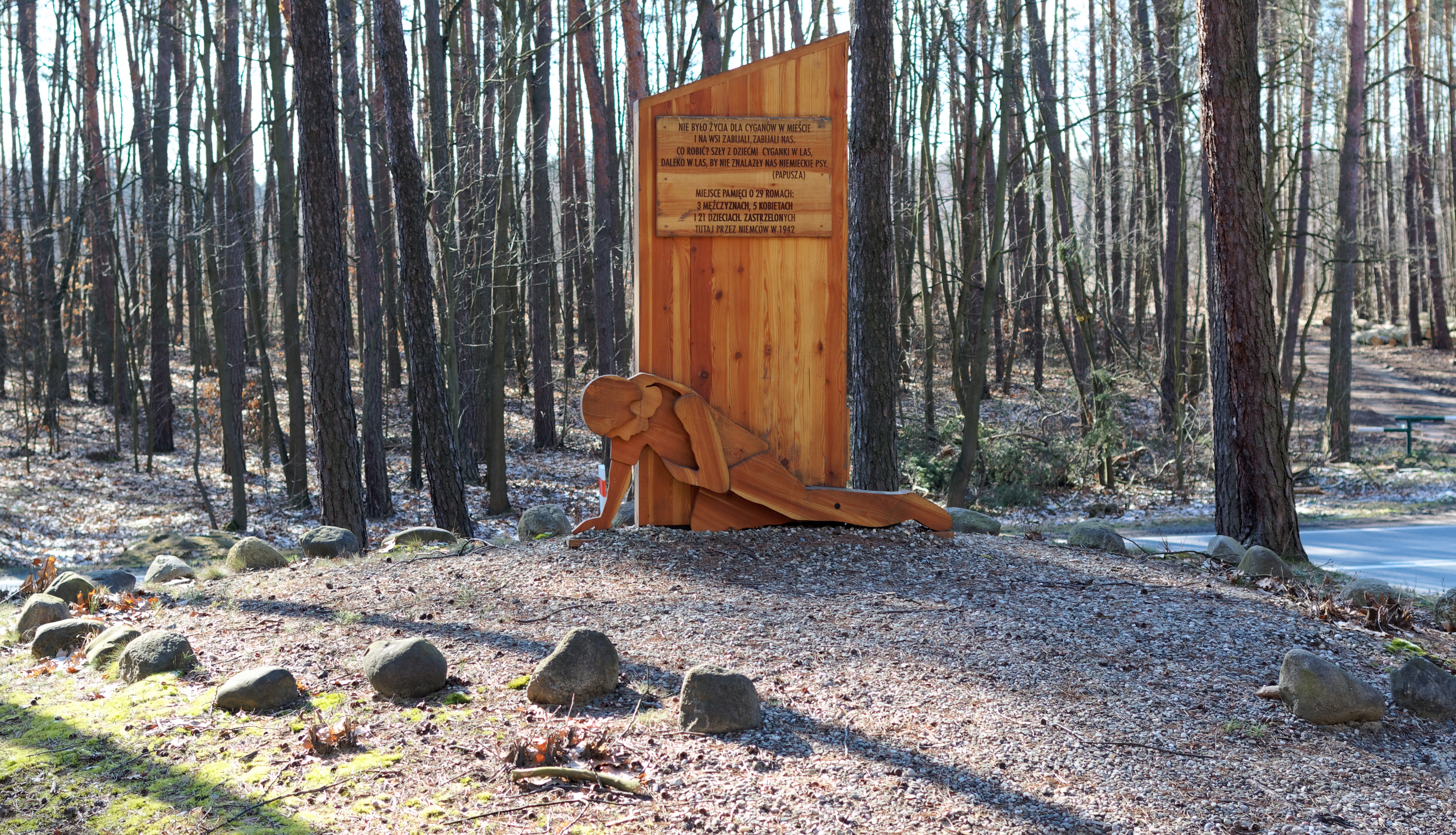
- Monument to the Memory of the Holocaust of the Romani in Borzęcin, Poland
- Observed by: Council of Europe, European Parliament, Croatia, Czech Republic, Lithuania, Poland, Romania, Slovakia, Ukraine
- Significance: Commemoration of the victims of the Romani Holocaust
- Date: 2 August
- Next time: 2 August 2027
- Frequency: Annual
- Related to: Holocaust memorial days

Roma Holocaust Memorial Day (Romani: Liparipnasqo Dives e Rromenqo vaś o Samudaripen) is a memorial day that commemorates the victims of the Romani Holocaust, which resulted in the murder of an estimated 220,000–500,000 Sinti and Romani people by Nazi Germany and its allies during World War II. The date of 2 August was chosen for the memorial because on the night of 2–3 August 1944, 2,897 Roma, mostly women, children and elderly people, were killed in the Gypsy family camp (Zigeunerfamilienlager) at the Auschwitz concentration camp. Some countries have chosen to commemorate the genocide on different dates.

== Establishment and commemoration ==
In 2004 the Verkhovna Rada (parliament of Ukraine) adopted a resolution on the commemoration of the International Remembrance Day of the Holocaust of the Roma.

In 2009 the Serbian Roma National Congress (Romski Nacionalni Savet) and the International Romani Union proposed the introduction of the Day of Remembrance of the Holocaust against the Roma/Porajmos.

In 2011 Poland established, by parliamentary resolution, the Genocide Remembrance Day of the Roma and Sinti (Dzień Pamięci o Zagładzie Romów i Sinti). Croatia, the Czech Republic, Lithuania, and Slovakia also observe 2 August as Roma and Sinti Genocide Remembrance Day.

The European Parliament on 15 April 2015 declared that, "a European day should be dedicated to commemorating the victims of the genocide of the Roma during World War II and that this day should be called the European Roma Holocaust Memorial Day".

The Council of Europe also holds commemoration ceremonies.

== Alternative dates ==
Finland, Germany, Ireland, Italy, Latvia, Portugal, Slovenia, Spain and Sweden commemorate the Romani Holocaust on 27 January, the International Holocaust Remembrance Day. The Czech Republic has four dates: 2 August, 7 March (the date of the first mass transport of Moravian Roma to Auschwitz), 13 May and 21 August. Latvia has three dates: 27 January, 8 April and 8 May.

In Serbia it is commemorated on 16 December, "in the memory of that date in 1942, when Himmler ordered the systematic deportation of Roma to concentration camps and their extermination".

== Monuments and memorials ==
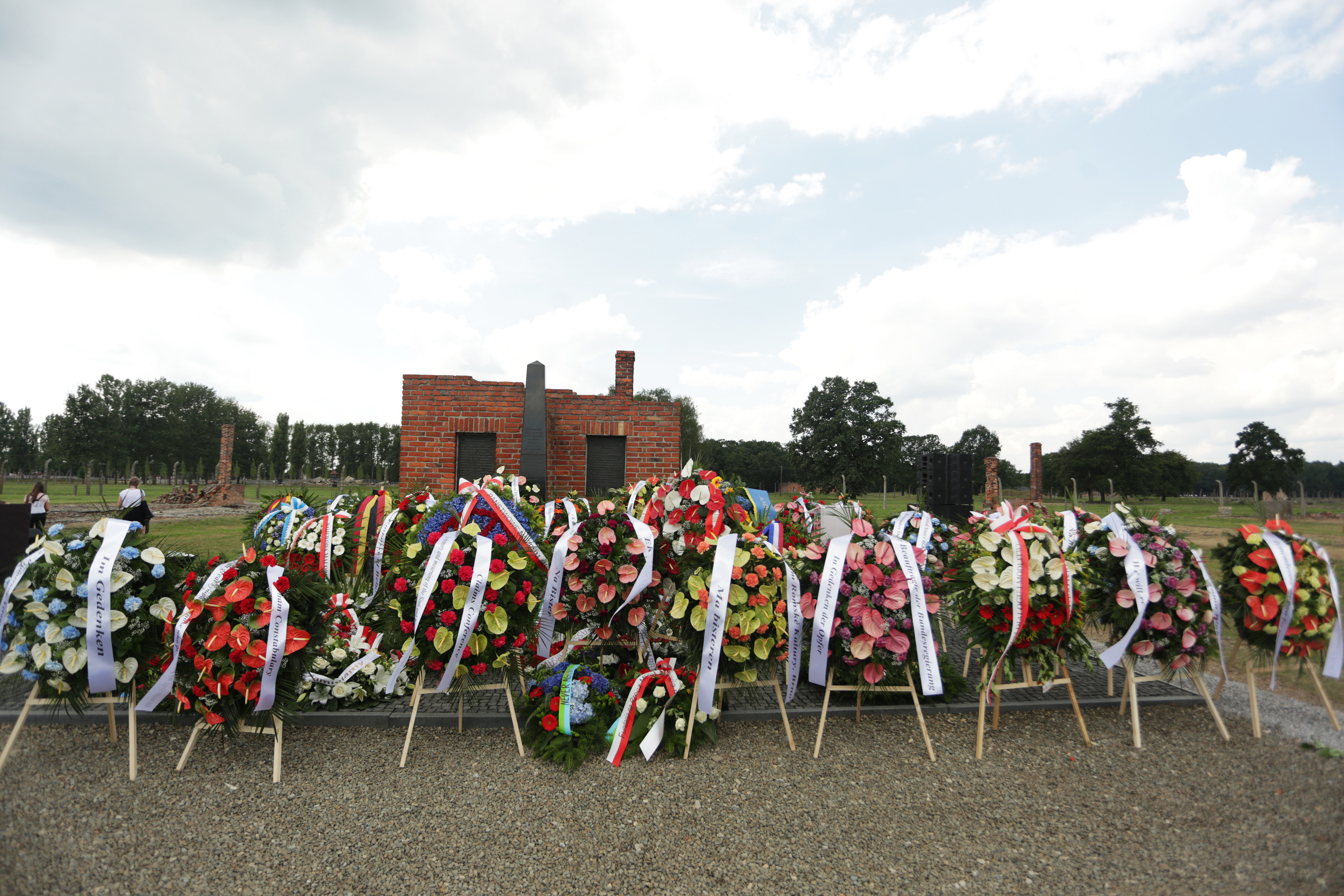
Wreaths at the memorial to the murdered Sinti and Roma in the Auschwitz-Birkenau concentration and extermination camp on 2 August 2019

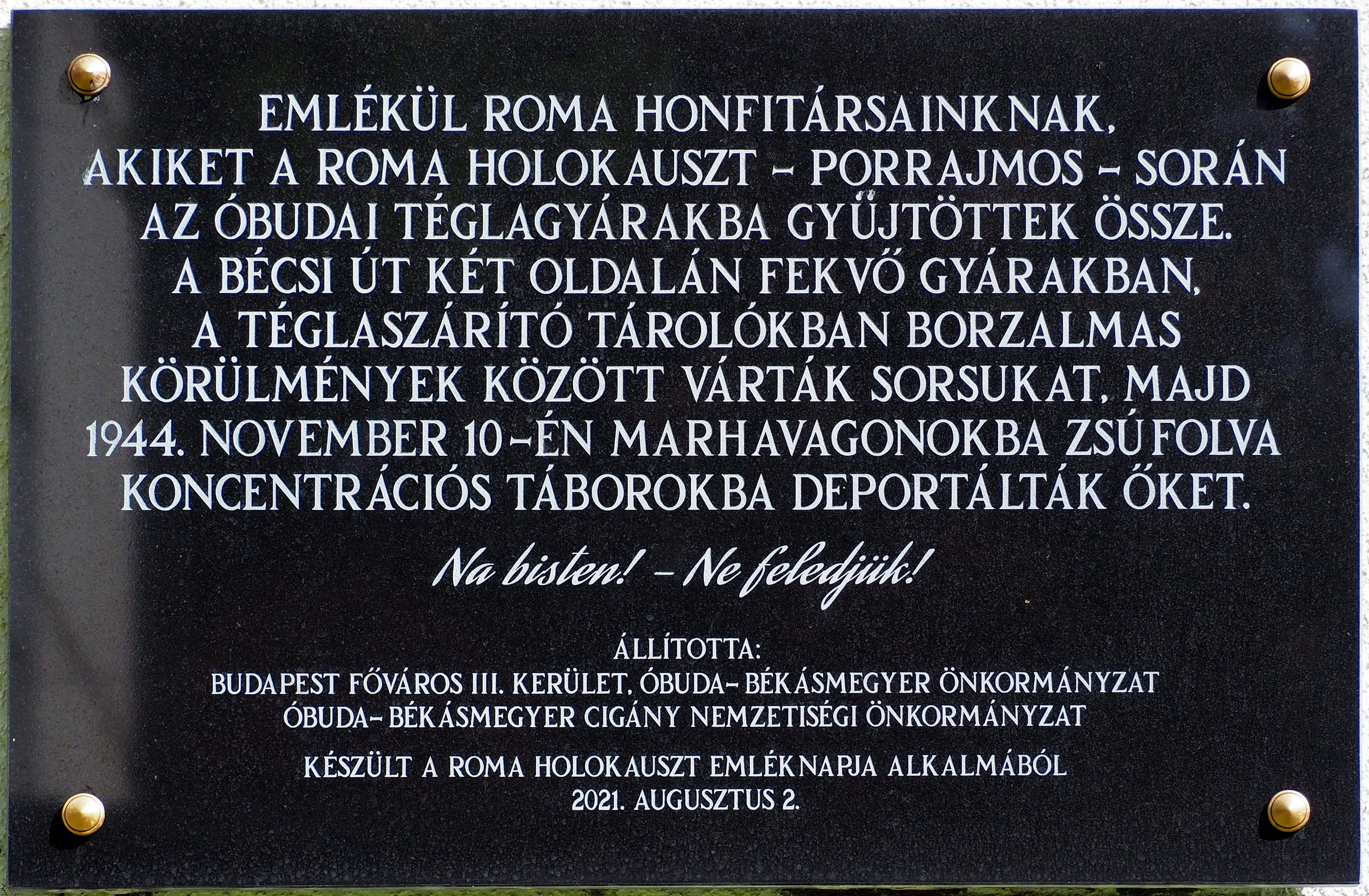
Plaque in Óbuda-Békásmegyer, Budapest, marking the Roma Holocaust; it was unveiled on 2 August 2021.
