= Szczurowa massacre =

Massacre of Romani people by Nazi Germany

- Part of Romani Holocaust
- Location: 50°06′59″N 20°38′14″E; Szczurowa, Poland
- Date: 3 August 1943; 83 years ago
- Target: Romani people
- Attack type: Extermination, mass murder
- Weapon: Guns
- Deaths: 93 Romani
- Perpetrator: German Nazi occupiers

The massacre in Szczurowa was the murder of 93 Romani people, including children, women and the elderly, by German Nazi occupiers in the Polish village of Szczurowa on 3 July 1943. Between ten and twenty families of settled Romani had lived in Szczurowa for generations, alongside ethnic Poles with whom they had friendly and neighborly relations. They were integrated enough into the general community that several mixed marriages existed.

== The massacre ==
On 3 July 1943, German police rounded up almost all the Romani inhabitants of the village and transported them to the local cemetery where they were shot. A list of all the victims has been preserved in the documents of the local church.

== Commemoration ==
On 8 May 1956, local inhabitants of the village and members of local veterans' associations erected a memorial stone with a suitable inscription at the site of the mass grave of the victims. This became the first memorial commemorating victims of the Romani Holocaust in the world. The memorial is cared for by local schoolchildren, and the memory of the tragedy is part of the local historical consciousness. The memorial refers to the victims as "locals" rather than Romani, which may reflect the integration of the Romani into the larger community. The decision to omit reference to the Romani people on the memorial may also result from political narrative shaping by the Polish government.

Since 1960, Romani from Tarnów have been coming to the region to honor the memory of the victims. Since 1996 the International Romani Caravan of Memory travels around the Tarnów region to commemorate the Nazi mass murder of Romani during World War II. The main stop of the caravan is Szczurowa, where, after a visit to the mass grave, a mass is held at the local church.

The Tarnów region was the site of other Nazi crimes against Romani in addition to that at Szczurowa. Most of the victims' identities and their place of burial are unknown. Other mass graves of murdered Romani in the region include those at Bielcza (28 murdered), Borzęcin Dolny (28 murdered) and Żabno (49 murdered).

The Romani people, who lived in Europe from the 15th century, were among the groups singled out by the Nazi Germany regime for persecution and were often murdered along with the Jews. Between 500,000 and 1,500,000 Romani were killed by the Nazis throughout Europe during Porajmos.

== See also ==
- Romani Holocaust
- List of massacres in Poland
