= A People Uncounted =

- Directed by: Aaron Yeger
- Produced by: Marc Swenker; Tom Rasky
- Cinematography: Stephen C. Whitehead
- Edited by: Kurt Engfehr
- Music by: Robi Botos
- Release date: August 20, 2011 (World Film Festival)
- Running time: 99 minutes
- Country: Canada
- Language: English

A People Uncounted is a 2011 Canadian documentary film directed by Aaron Yeger. It tells the story about the culture and history of the Romani people (commonly known as gypsies) in Europe, with special emphasis on their plight during The Holocaust. The film also warns of the similarities in intolerance between the time of the Porajmos (Romani Holocaust) and the increasing intolerance and abuse of Roma rights in Europe today. It was nominated for a Producers Guild of America award in 2012. The film was featured in the New York Gipsy Festival and is part of Vanderbilt University's Holocaust Lecture Series. The film was shot in 11 different countries, and is the first non-fiction documentary film to be dedicated to the Romani victims of the Porajmos.
