= Jagniówka =

- Village
- Location within Poland
- Coordinates: 50°7′12″N 20°42′13″E
- Country: Poland
- Voivodeship: Lesser Poland
- County: Brzesko
- Gmina: Borzęcin
- Population: 230

Jagniówka [jaɡˈɲufka] is a village in the administrative district of Gmina Borzęcin, within Brzesko County, Lesser Poland Voivodeship, in southern Poland.
