= Margarethe Kraus =

Holocaust survivor

Margarete Kraus
- Born: 16 December 1928
- Died: 20 December 2005 (aged 77)
- Known for: Survivor of the Roma Holocaust

Margarete Kraus (16 December 1928 – 20 December 2005) was a Roma woman who was persecuted during the Porajmos, imprisoned at Auschwitz and Ravensbruck. Her experience was recorded in later life by the photographer Reimar Gilsenbach.

== Biography ==
Whilst little is known about Kraus' early life, what is known is that she was a young woman of Roma origin, who was living in Czechoslovakia with her family prior to their deportation to Auschwitz in 1943. Roma and Sinti people were persecuted during the Holocaust and the Kraus family were part of the 500,000 who were murdered in the Romani genocide. Kraus was deported to Auschwitz in 1943 alongside her family; they were held in what became known as the Gypsy family camp. She was subjected to medical experimentation during her internment. She suffered extreme abuse and deprivation, and also contracted typhus. Her parents were murdered in Auschwitz, and she was subsequently moved to Ravensbruck where she was used for forced labour.

In 1966, Kraus was photographed by journalist Reimar Gilsenbach (it) in the German Democratic Republic. She posed at the window of her caravan and the tattoo she was marked with at Auschwitz is clearly visible on her left arm. She told Gilsenbach that her parents were both murdered in Auschwitz and that she was then transferred to the Ravensbrück concentration camp where she worked as a slave. However, she did not mention the medical experimentation she endured.

== Legacy ==
Kraus was featured in the 2019 exhibition Forgotten Victims: The Nazi Genocide of the Roma and Sinti at the Wiener Holocaust Library in London. The exhibition highlighted the persecution of Roma and Sinti communities and the murder of 500,000 people, termed Porajmos in Romani.
