= Rights of the Roma in the European Union =

The European Union is committed to upholding Human Rights and sees this as a core and essential part of its role. As such the EU seeks to protect and defend these rights within member states and in interactions with non-members.

The Roma are one of the largest minority groups within the EU numbering over six million people. Despite their number they have faced a long history of systematic abuse and significant marginalisation within Europe. Reports on the situation of the Roma within Europe have found that they remain one of the most vulnerable minorities and still fall significantly behind their European counterparts in regards to education, employment, access to health care, and housing.

The EU recognises that there are issues of human rights violations relating to the treatment and integration of the Roma within the EU and have taken steps to encourage each member state to take responsibility and work towards greater Roma inclusion specifically in the areas of health, housing, education and employment and non-discrimination at a policy, police and social level.

== Historical Persecution ==
Antiziganism has resulted in a long history of persecution of the Roma people. From the time of their initial migration in the 11th or 12th century they have faced mistrust, abuse, slavery, and general discrimination. This reached a peak during the Second World War where a large number of Roma faced genocide at the hands of the Nazis in the Porajmos (Roma Holocaust).

Since World War Two the continued migration of the Roma from Eastern Europe to the rest of Europe has resulted in continued discrimination and marginalisation often stemming from misunderstanding, fear, and systematic abuse.

== Lisbon Treaty ==
Under the Lisbon treaty the European Union was given an extra degree of force and ability to address issues of human rights violations within its member states.

The Lisbon treaty came into force on 1 December 2009 and with it the EU Charter of Fundamental Rights became legally binding, having the same force as primary EU law and making it the primary source of human rights law within the European Union. This was a significant step for the EU's ability to ensure human rights are maintained within member states and allow the EU courts to strike down legislation that was not consistent with the Human Rights charter

== National Roma integration strategy ==
The European Union has taken positive steps towards changing the position of the Roma and eliminating discrimination against them. In 2011, under the EU framework for national integration strategies up to 2020, they called upon each EU member state to produce a concrete plan to improve the situation of the marginalised Roma specifically focusing on the areas of housing, education, healthcare, and employment.

Under this framework for inclusion up until 2020 the EU has established the following goals stated in their 2012 communication

1. Housing: minimise the gap between the Roma access to housing and utilities and the rest of the population. And promote desegregation of the Roma
2. Education: To ensure that Roma children complete at minimum quality primary education
3. Employment: To minimise the employment difference between the Roma and the rest of the EU population
4. Healthcare: Improve access to healthcare for Roma people, closing the gap between the Roma and the rest of the population
5. Discrimination: The EU has also called upon member states to take positive steps to ensure the Roma are not subject to discrimination but are treated equally and given access to all the rights afforded them under the EU Charter of fundamental rights

Under the EU integration strategy, EU member states produce yearly reports detailing the progress they have made toward meeting their responsibilities towards Roma integration. This allows the EU to provide accountability and ongoing support to member states as they jointly work towards the goal of integration.

The European Union also provides funding either directly to member states, or through the European Commission, to help implement policies of Roma Inclusion within the EU.

== Statelessness and Use of Refugee Status ==
Many Roma children within the EU are not registered at birth. This is for a variety of reasons ranging from mistrust of public institutions preventing Roma from accessing hospital birthing care, through to lack of funds needed to register, or a general unawareness of some Roma to the need to register a child

This lack of registration can oftentimes leave a child stateless. It can prevent them from gaining citizenship and in many cases denies them access to education, healthcare, and protection under state laws

In many non-EU countries where rights such as birth registration, education, healthcare, and legal protection are violated, discrimination and social marginalisation persist for the Roma. Many later enter the EU as a means of escaping these conditions, but the standards of recognising the Roma as a persecuted group due to their country of origin varies. As such, they have been selectively deported from countries such as Germany and France, even when formally seeking asylum. Despite the fact that many face de facto legal discrimination and poor rights protections upon returning to countries such as Serbia, Germany no longer recognises Roma born in Balkan countries as having a well-founded fear of persecution. Activists have noted these deportations have accelerated in recent years, despite a lack of measured improvement of these countries towards "safe countries of origin" for the Roma. Under the 1951 United Nations Convention Relating to the Status of Refugees it is a violation of human rights law to send those seeking asylum back to a country where they have a well-founded "fear of persecution" based on their membership in a particular social group.

== Right to Housing ==
Under Article 25(1) of the Universal Declaration of Human Rights it is clear that the right to adequate housing and a safe and secure community in which they can live in peace is one afforded to all regardless of race, religion or gender. This is also supported by the 1966 International Covenant on Economic, Social and Cultural Rights (ICESCR) which also protects against forced evictions and the arbitrary destruction of ones place of residence

The Charter of Fundamental Rights of the European Union also recognises this right and states that an individual who lacks resources has a right to housing assistance in an effort to combat social exclusion and poverty (Paragraph 3)

The European Union also recognises that adequate housing is essential in order for other social, economic, and political rights to be met, and recognised housing as one of the major issues of focus in member nations Roma inclusion programs.

Despite all this, the Roma housing situation is significantly lacking when compared to the general EU population and generally falls far below the acceptable minimum standard of housing. Many Roma houses also lack access to water, electricity, or gas, basic elements that the majority of EU citizens enjoy

Additionally, Roma within the EU are facing continued and increasing forceful eviction and arbitrary destruction of their homes in violation of the ICESRC. This is often done in disregard to the ruling in FEANTSA v France, Complaint No. 39/2006 which concluded that where evictions need to take place they need to be carried out in a manner that respects the dignity of the people concerned.

=== Romania ===
There are many cases in Romania of Roma people being forcibly evicted and/or reassigned to "ghettos" where there is substandard housing.

One of the most significant cases is that of the Pata Rât slum: This case concerns events in 2010 where 76 integrated and longstanding Roma families, many of whom had been living in the community for over 20 years, were forcibly evicted from their homes in the centre of Cluj-Napoca. This was done without adequate notice, reason, or opportunity to appeal eviction. 40 of these families were relocated to inadequate housing, without access to power or water, next to a former chemical waste dump on the outskirts of the city. The rest were left essentially homeless.

It was not until the end of 2013 that the courts ruled that the eviction was illegal and that the discrimination against Roma should be compensated and the families relocated to adequate housing. However, as the decision has been appealed by the state, there has, to date, been no resolution given to the Roma families involved.

=== France ===
France is in the midst of significant human rights violations relating to discrimination and systematic forcible eviction of the Roma.

In 2010 the French instituted a policy of systematic forced deportation of non-French Roma. Alongside this policy the forcible eviction of the Roma (both French and non-French Roma) from their homes escalated. In 2013 there were more than 20,000 Roma forcibly evicted from their homes in France, and less than 40% of these were offered adequate housing alternatives. In a number of cases authorities used force and tear gas in the process of the evictions, including in cases of forced evictions of elderly and children

In 2010 a French memo was leaked which showed that the government was supporting the systematic discrimination of the Roma. Circular IOC/K/1017881 of 5 August 2010 on the eviction of illegal settlements states that:

"It is down to the préfect state representative in each department to organise (….) the systematic dismantling of the illegal camps, particularly those occupied by the Roma."

And

"As part of the objectives that have been set, (…) prefects must carry out, within their geographical areas of responsibility, at least one operation per week, be it an evacuation, dismantling, or expulsion, with priority being given to Roma."

These forcible evictions of Roma show significant abuse of the right to housing, and the right to freedom of movement. There is evidence of discrimination on an ethnic basis that violates France's responsibilities under various UN and EU human rights treaties.

Following these mass evictions the European Union Commissioner Viviane Reding (Commission of the European Communities) spoke out against the French actions stating it was in breach of EU Law. She likened it to the atrocities that befall the Roma in the World War II stating that she had thought "Europe would not have to witness it again after the Second World War,".

The legality of the 2010 forcible evictions and subsequent deportation of Roma was also brought before the European Committee of Social Rights in the case of COHRE v. France Complaint No. 63/2010 it was found that the evictions were discriminatory, failed to respect human dignity, and were contrary to France's human rights obligations

These human rights violations signify a French policy of exclusion towards the Roma. To date, the systematic eviction and deportation of the Roma within France continue despite the EU, French ombudsmen, and various NGOs calling upon the French government to stop the forcible and illegal evictions of Roma people.

=== EU Response ===
Despite significant issues arising in member states such as Romania, Italy, and France. The EU recognises the complex human rights issues arising relating to the Roma and the Right to Housing. It is one of the key areas addressed under the EU integration strategy and the EU has been vocal in the need for member states to respect the Roma right to housing as a part of their integration strategies.

In 2010 the European Union also implemented a regulation that allowed funding for marginalised communities that needed housing interventions. This intervention is available for Roma integration programs. There have been a number of key and successful integration programs providing access to housing as a result of this funding.

One successful case is the example of the Maro Temm settlement in Keil Germany. An important part of the integration of the Roma is to allow them to protect their identity and culture without isolating them from the general community or resources. Maro Temm is a housing community of 13 units within Keil. It is occupied by Roma and Sinti of all generations and is a community where they are able to retain and share their culture and language. It is a small community in the midst of the general population (not isolated on the outskirts), allowing the Roma access to the same educational and healthcare opportunities as their Non Roma counterparts. As a settlement it provides the Roma with security, preservation of culture, as well as wider community integration and its location within the general community also allows for the minority and majority to build a relationship of trust that helps end discrimination.

The EU also provides remedy under the Racial Equality Directive 2000/43/EC which the EU has adopted to prevent discrimination on the basis of ethnicity or race in areas which including access to housing.

== Right to education ==
The right to education is enshrined in both the EU and international law. Article 2 of the EU convention on human rights recognises the right to education for all. Similarly the Universal Declaration of Human Rights (article 26) and the ICESCR (articles 13 & 14) recognise the right to quality education without discrimination as a universal human right.

Roma children are severely underrepresented in education and are often discriminated against and segregated within a countries education system. Simply by being Roma education becomes more difficult. Roma children face language barriers due to the language of instruction being in something other than their first language. They often start school later than their non-Roma counterparts, and they face social stigmatisation from their classmates and teachers simply by being Roma.

One of the major issues that the Roma face in access to education is systematic segregation

=== Segregation ===
The European Court of Human Rights has reinforced the fact that the right to education ought to be free from discrimination. Segregation is a form of discrimination that the Roma often face in accessing education.

There are three types of segregation of Roma that happen in education.

==== Segregation of Roma into Roma majority schools ====
This is a form of segregation that arises almost unwittingly as a result of residential segregation and the ghettoisation of Roma. The children in Roma majority schools often face violations of the right to education due resulting from Roma majority schools having substandard facilities and lacking resources that majority schools have.

There are also cases where Roma children have been forced to attend Roma-only schools even where this is not the closest school to them. thus limiting the level and quality of education that Romas receive. In the 2013 case of Lavida v. Greece the courts found that these forced segregations were a breach of the right to be free from discrimination and the right to education. And they condemned the state's refusal to take anti-segregation measures in relation to the education of Roma students.

==== Segregation of Roma in general schools ====
Even within majority schools, Roma often fail to access the same level of education as their peers because they are often segregated into remedial, or "roma classes", within the school.

There have been a number of cases where this segregation of Roma students has been found to be in violation of their right to education without discrimination.

In the 2008 case of Sampanis v Greece which was heard in the European Court of Human Rights. It was found that the failure to allow Roma children to enroll in school, plus the subsequent separation of the children into a separate Roma-only class in an annex of the school, was a violation of article 14 of the EU convention on human rights.

Despite the court ruling on this case, systematic segregation of Roma children continued. Following the 2008 judgment a 12th primary school was opened to replace the annex and required that all students from a particular area move to that school (this included the students from the original Sampanis and other schools). This effectively established a ghetto school of Roma-only students where the education provided was lower than that of the Greek majority 10th school within the same area. In 2012 a second case was bought the court and in Sampani and others v Greece the court again found that Greece had failed to prevent discrimination in access to education for Roma children. The court ordered that the children who were still of school age be transferred to another integrated state school.

There are a number of cases such as Orsus and Others v Croatia where courts have found that the segregation of Roma students into special classes or into Roma only schools was discrimination, and violated the fundamental right of education without discrimination.

==== Segregation of Roma into special schools ====
A serious violation of the Roma right to education arises in the unlawful segregation of Roma students into "special schools". In many countries in eastern Europe, there is a significantly disproportionate number of Roma children who are classified "special needs" and put into special education schools.

Language barriers, lack of Roma attendance at preschool or kindergarten, and an often delayed start to school lead to Roma lagging behind their non-Roma counterparts. They are often subject to unfair testing which results in being put in either remedial classes within a normal school, or more often put into special education schools. Students in special schools do not receive equal education and no longer have the ability to graduate and gain higher education.

A Czech case was bought before the Human rights court in 2007 which addressed the disproportionate number of Roma students in special education. D.H. and Others v. the Czech Republic (application no. 57325/00) found that the placement of Roma children into "special schools" was not justified and breached Article 14 (prohibition of discrimination) in relation to the right to education (article 2 of protocol no. 1) It also found that the tests administered to the Roma children before placing them into special education were biased and did not take into account the special circumstances of the Roma children and were not a fair and accurate portrayal of the Roma children's abilities. A number of other cases have established the same conclusion. A Hungarian case in 2013 also found discrimination against minority children in the testing before placement into special education

==== EU response ====
Despite the finding in the courts of human rights violations relating to the access of education for Roma children, the EU recognises that the systematic segregation of Roma children in education is still a significant area of concern. And that to date there has been little progress in a number of eastern European EU countries to change the situation for the Roma, as a result, the EU continues to call upon the EU member states to make changes to end systematic discrimination.

In other areas, there have been some positive examples and changes to the situation of Roma education in the EU thanks to the funding of education programs under the integration strategies. These successes include the increase of Roma attendance in preschool education which provides a solid foundation for educational success and a unique situation in Ireland where teachers have been employed to travel with migrant gypsy communities to ensure that education is maintained within their migrant culture.
