= Romani Holocaust =

Genocide of the Romani in Europe during World War II

- Part of World War II
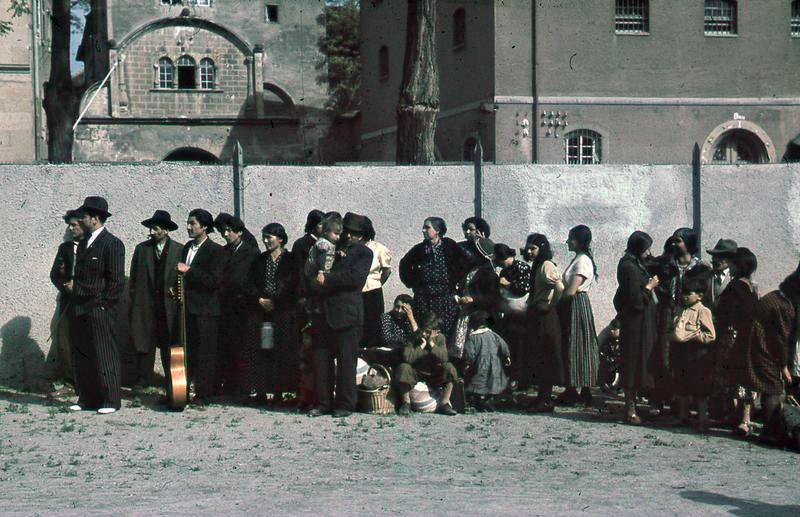
- European Roma in Asperg, Nazi Germany, are rounded up for deportation by Nazi German authorities on 22 May 1940.
- Location: German-occupied Europe
- Date: 1939–1945
- Target: European Roma (Note: Five Yenish people and 279 Woonwagenbewoners were deported, though efforts to register them in a Landfahrersippenarchiv were never completed by the end of the war. See Persecution of Yenish and Woonwagenbewoners by Nazi Germany.)
- Attack type: Genocide, ethnic cleansing, mass murder, starvation, mass shooting, concentration camps, death camps
- Deaths: 130,000; 250,000 - 500,000; 1,500,000
- Perpetrators: Nazi Germany and its allies and collaborators, Vichy France
- Motive: Antiziganism, Germanisation, Pan-Germanism, Racism, Nazi racial policy

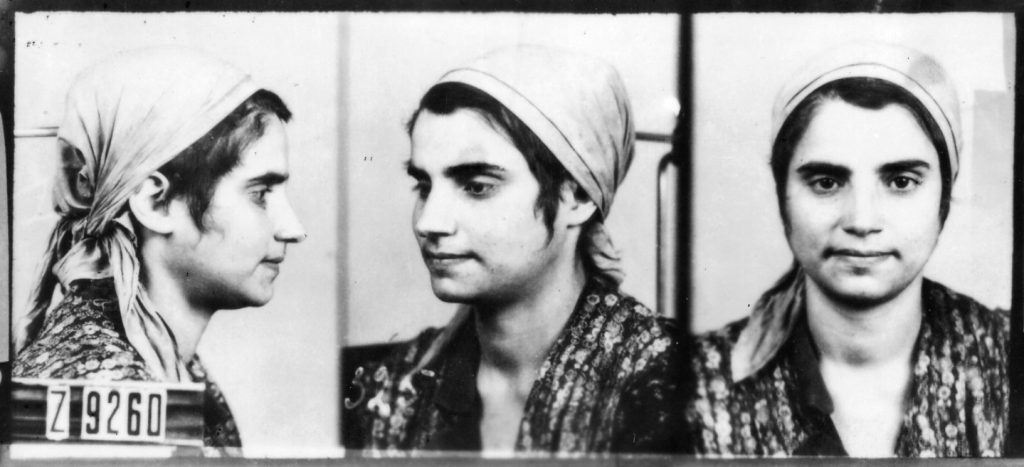
Stephanie Holomek, a Roma victim of the Holocaust.

The Romani Holocaust, also known as the Porajmos, (Note: Also known as the Porajmos (Romani pronunciation: [pʰoɽajˈmos], meaning "the Devouring"), the Pharrajimos (meaning "the Cutting up", "the Fragmentation", "the Destruction"), the Samudaripen ("Mass killing"), or the Kali Trash ("Black Dread").) was the genocide of European Roma and Sinti people during World War II. Beginning in 1933, Nazi Germany systematically persecuted the European Roma, Sinti and other peoples through forcible internment and compulsory sterilization. German authorities summarily and arbitrarily subjected Romani people to incarceration, forced labor, deportation and mass murder in concentration and extermination camps.

Under Adolf Hitler, a supplementary decree to the Nuremberg Laws was issued on 26 November 1935, classifying the Romani people (or Roma) as "enemies of the race-based state", thereby placing them in the same category as the Jews. Thus, the fate of the Sinti and Roma in Europe paralleled that of the Jews in the Holocaust. Historians estimate that at least 250,000 Romani and Sinti were killed during the Holocaust, although this could be as high as 500,000.

In 1982, West Germany formally recognized that Nazi Germany had committed genocide against Sinti and Roma people. In 2011, Poland officially declared August 2nd as day of commemoration of the Romani genocide.

Within the Nazi German state, first persecution, then extermination, was aimed primarily at sedentary "Gypsy mongrels". In December 1942, Heinrich Himmler ordered the deportation of all Sinti and Roma from the Greater Germanic Reich, and most were sent to the specially established Gypsy concentration camp at Auschwitz-Birkenau. Other Sinti and Roma were deported there from the Nazi-occupied Western European territories. Approximately 21,000 of the 23,000 European Roma and Sinti sent there did not survive. In areas outside the reach of systematic registration, e.g., in the German-occupied areas of Eastern and Southeastern Europe, the Roma who were most threatened were those who, in the German judgment, were "vagabonds", though some were actually refugees or displaced persons. Here, they were killed mainly in massacres perpetrated by the German military and police formations as well as by the Schutzstaffel (SS) task forces, and in armed resistance against the Nazi German occupation of Europe.

== Pre-Nazi discrimination ==
Prior to Nazi persecution, Romani people were stereotyped as dishonest, wandering criminals who were likely to steal.

=== Anti-Romani discrimination before 1933 ===
==== Emergence of scientific racism ====
In the late 19th century, the emergence of scientific racism and Social Darwinism, linking social differences with racial differences, provided the German public with pseudoscientific justifications for prejudices against Jews and Roma. During this period, "the concept of race was systematically employed in order to explain social phenomena." Proponents of this approach attempted to validate the belief that races were not variations of a single species of man because they had distinctly different biological origins. Proponents of this approach established a purportedly scientifically based racial hierarchy, which they believed defined certain minority groups as the other on the basis of biology.

In addition to being a period in which racial pseudoscience was widely promoted, the end of the 19th century was a period of state-sponsored modernization in Germany. Industrial development altered many aspects of society. Most notably, the changes which occurred during this period caused the social norms of work and life to shift. For the Roma, this shift in the social norms of work and life led to the denial of their traditional way of life as craftsmen and artisans. János Bársony notes that "industrial development devalued their services as craftsmen, resulting in the disintegration of their communities and social marginalization."

==== Persecution by the German Empire and the Weimar Republic ====
The developments of racial pseudoscience and modernization resulted in anti-Romani state interventions, carried out by both the German Empire and the Weimar Republic. In 1899, the Imperial Police Headquarters in Munich established the Information Services on Romani by the Security Police. Its purpose was to keep records (identification cards, fingerprints, photographs, etc.) and continuous surveillance on the Roma community. In 1904, Prussia adopted a resolution calling for regulation of Gypsy movement. In 1911, the Bavarian Ministry of the Interior organized a conference in Munich to discuss the "Gypsy problem" and to coordinate efforts against Gypsies. Roma in the Weimar Republic were forbidden from entering public swimming pools, parks, and other recreational areas, and depicted throughout Germany and Europe as criminals and spies.

The 1926 "Law for the Fight Against Gypsies, Vagrants and the Workshy" was enforced in Bavaria, and became the national norm by 1929. It stipulated that groups identifying as 'Gypsies' avoid all travel to the region. Those already living in the area were to "be kept under control so that there [was] no longer anything to fear from them with regard to safety in the land." They were forbidden from "roam[ing] about or camp[ing] in bands", and those "unable to prove regular employment" risked being sent to forced labor for up to two years. Herbet Heuss notes that "[t]his Bavarian law became the model for other German states and even for neighbouring countries."

The demand for Roma to give up their nomadic ways and settle in a specific region was often the focus of anti-Romani policy both in the German Empire and the Weimar Republic. Once settled, communities were concentrated and isolated in a single area of a town or city. This segregation facilitated state-run surveillance practices and 'crime prevention.'

Following the passage of the Law for the Fight Against Gypsies, Vagrants, and the Workshy, public policy increasingly targeted the Roma on the explicit basis of race. In 1927, Prussia passed a law that required all Roma to carry identity cards. Eight thousand Roma were processed this way and subjected to mandatory fingerprinting and photographing. Two years later, the focus became more explicit. In 1929, the German state of Hessen proposed the "Law for the Fight Against the Gypsy Menace". The same year, the Centre for the Fight Against Gypsies in Germany was opened. This body enforced restrictions on travel for undocumented Roma and "allowed for the arbitrary arrest and detention of gypsies as a means of crime prevention."

== Early Nazi persecution ==
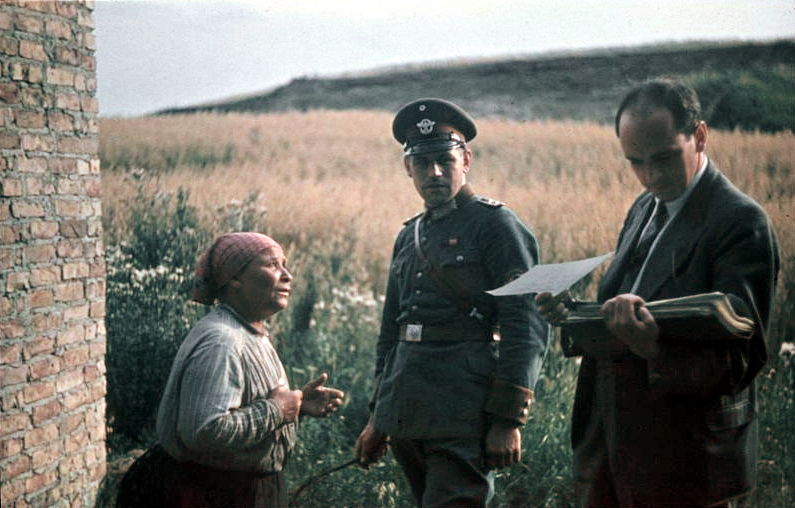
Romani woman with a German police officer and Nazi psychologist Robert Ritter

For centuries, Romani tribes had been subject to antiziganist persecution and humiliation in Europe. They were stigmatized as habitual criminals, social misfits, and vagabonds. When Hitler came to national power in 1933, anti-Gypsy laws in Germany remained in effect. Under the "Law against Dangerous Habitual Criminals" of November 1933, the police arrested many Roma, along with others the Nazis viewed as "asocial"—prostitutes, beggars, homeless vagrants, and alcoholics—and imprisoned them in internment camps.

After Hitler's rise to power, legislation against the Romani was increasingly based upon a rhetoric of racism. Policy originally based on the premise of "fighting crime" was redirected to "fighting a people". Targeted groups were no longer determined on juridical grounds, but instead, were victims of racialized policy.

The Department of Racial Hygiene and Population Biology began to experiment on Romani to determine criteria for their racial classification.

The Nazis established the Racial Hygiene and Demographic Biology Research Unit (Rassenhygienische und Bevölkerungsbiologische Forschungsstelle, Department L3 of the Reich Department of Health) in 1936. Headed by Robert Ritter and his assistant Eva Justin, this unit was mandated to conduct an in-depth study of the "Gypsy question (Zigeunerfrage)" and to provide data required for formulating a new Reich "Gypsy law". After extensive fieldwork in the spring of 1936, consisting of interviews and medical examinations to determine the racial classification of the Roma, the unit decided that most Romani, whom they had concluded were not of "pure Gypsy blood", posed a danger to German racial purity and should be deported or eliminated. No decision was made regarding the remainder (about 10 percent of the total Romani population of Europe), primarily Sinti and Lalleri tribes living in Germany. Several suggestions were made. Reichsführer-SS Heinrich Himmler suggested deporting the Romani to a remote reservation, as the United States had done to Native Americans, where "pure Gypsies" could continue their nomadic lifestyle unhindered. According to him:

The aim of measures taken by the State to defend the homogeneity of the German nation must be the physical separation of Gypsydom from the German nation, the prevention of miscegenation, and finally, the regulation of the way of life of pure and part-Gypsies. The necessary legal foundation can only be created through a Gypsy Law, which prevents further intermingling of blood, and which regulates all the most pressing questions which go together with the existences of Roma in the living space of the German nation.

Himmler took special interest in the "Aryan" origins of the Romani and distinguished between "settled" (assimilated) and "unsettled" Romani. In May 1942 an order was issued according to which all "Gypsies" living in the Balkans were to be arrested.

Although the Nazi regime never produced the "Gypsy Law" desired by Himmler, policies and decrees were passed which discriminated against the Romani people. Roma were classified as "asocial" and "criminals" by the Nazi regime. From 1933 on, some Roma were placed in concentration camps, usually categorised as asocials. After 1937, the Nazis started to carry out racial examinations on the Roma living in Germany. From 1935, whole populations of Romani were forcibly interned in Zigeunerlager ("Gypsy Camps"). In 1938, Himmler issued an order regarding the 'Gypsy question' which explicitly mentioned "race", stating that it was "advisable to deal with the Gypsy question on the basis of race." The decree made it law to register all Roma (including Mischlinge – mixed race), as well as those people who "travel around in a Gypsy fashion" over the age of six. Although the Nazis believed that the Roma had originally been Aryan, over time, the Nazis said, they became mixed-race and so were classified as "non-Aryan" and of an "alien race".

Dr. Ritter proposed a theory that Romani people were socially harmful due to a dangerous genetic defect he termed Wandertrieb, meaning a nomadic instinct or an impulse to wander or travel.

=== Loss of citizenship ===
The Nuremberg race laws passed on 15 September 1935. The first Nuremberg Law, the "Law for the Protection of German Blood and Honor", forbade marriage and extramarital intercourse between Jews and Germans. The second Nuremberg law, "The Reich Citizenship Law", stripped Jews of their German citizenship. On 26 November 1935, Germany expanded the Nuremberg laws to also apply to the Roma. Romani, like Jews, lost their right to vote on 7 March 1936.

== Genocide ==
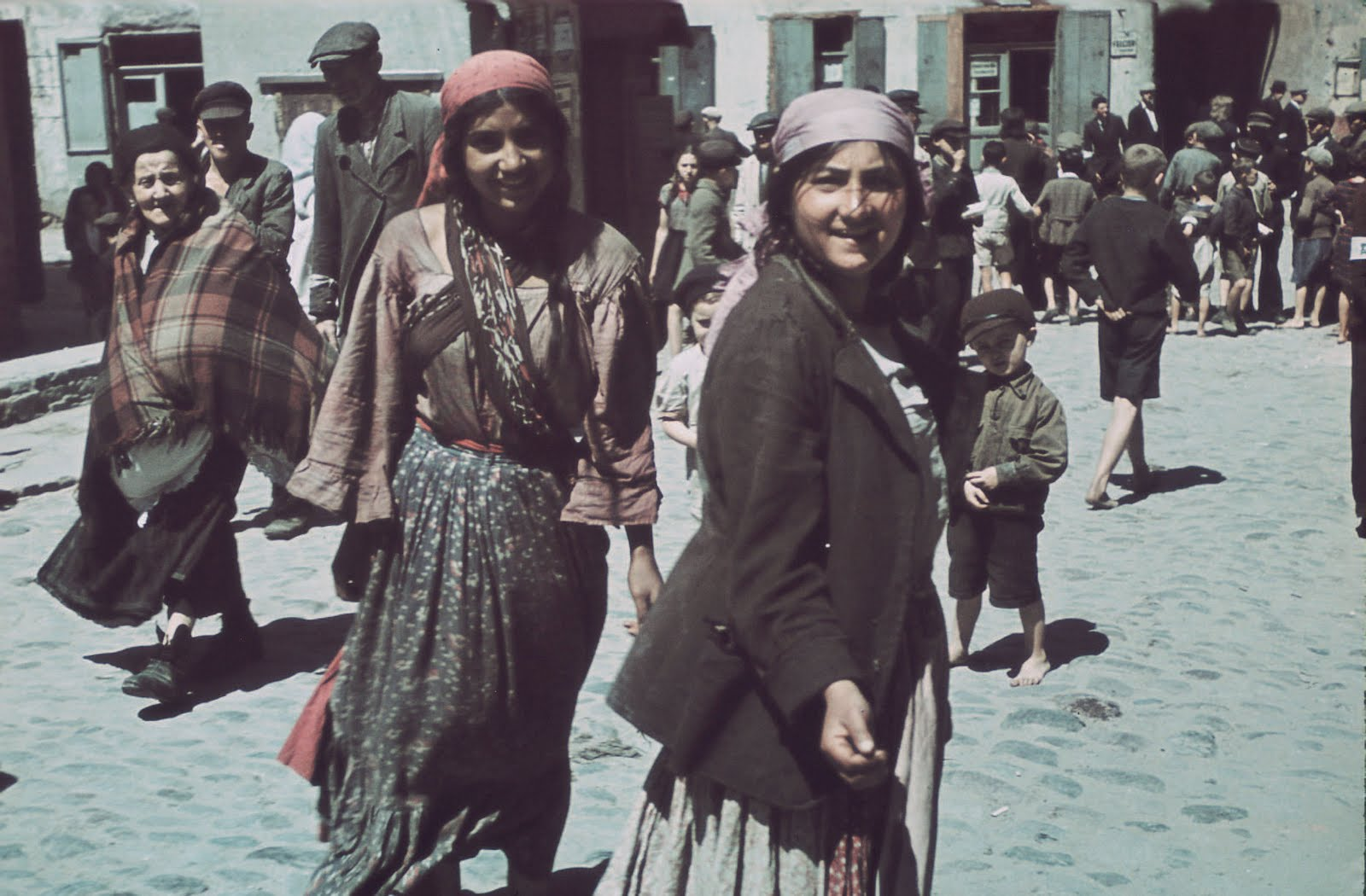
Romani women at Lublin Ghetto, 1941

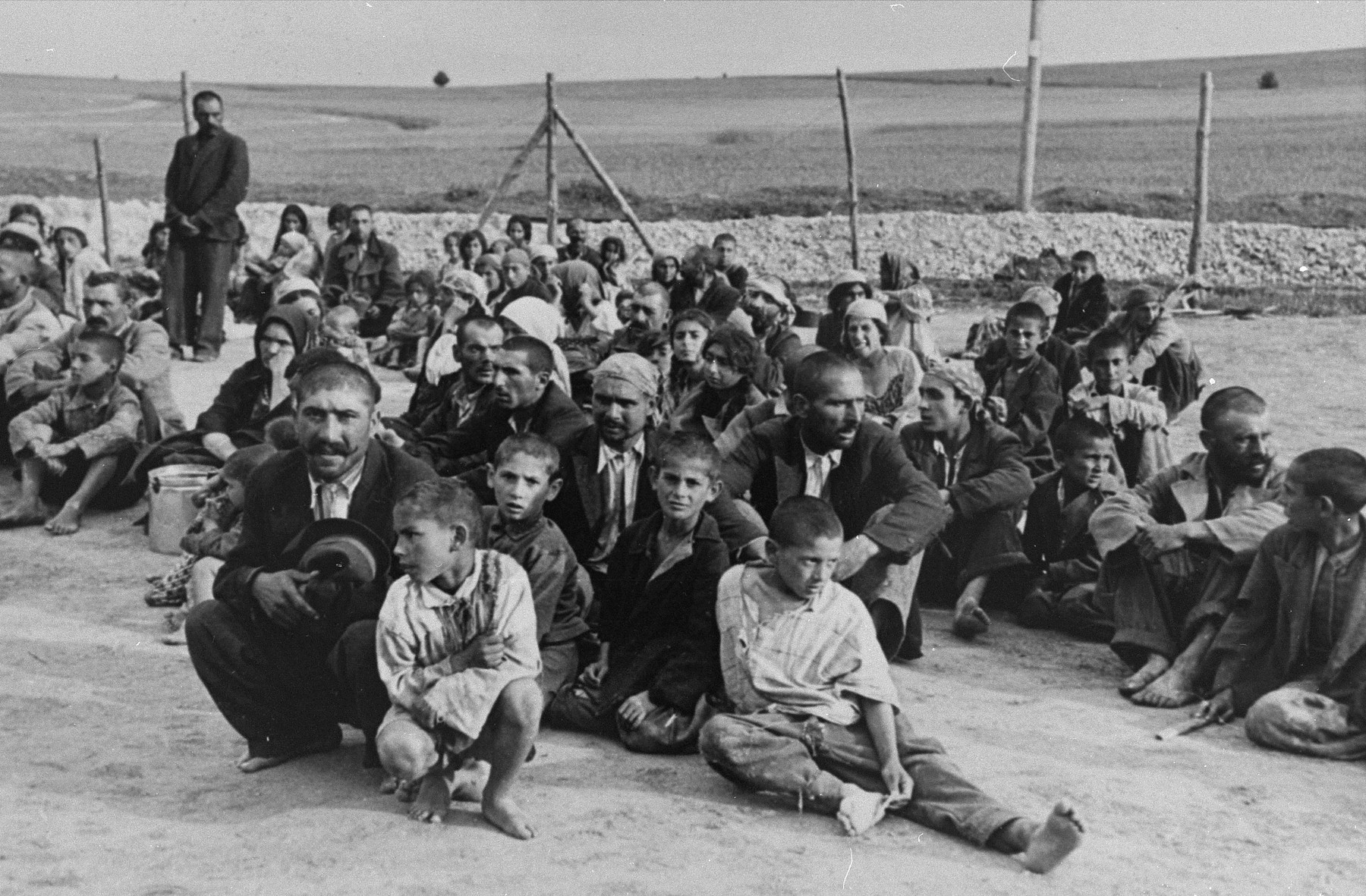
Romani prisoners at Belzec extermination camp, 1940

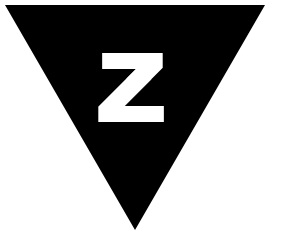
Black triangle with Z for Zigeuner ('gypsy').

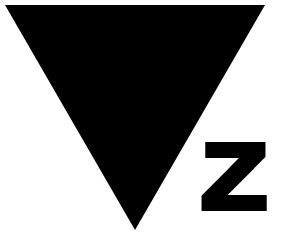
Variant of the black triangle with Z.

Brown triangle issued to Roma men in some camps.

Concentration camp badges issued to Romani prisoners.

The Third Reich's government began persecuting the Romani as early as 1935 when they started to transfer the people to municipal internment camps (Zigeunerlager) on the outskirts of cities, a prelude to their deportation to concentration camps. A December 1937 decree on "crime prevention" provided the pretext for major roundups of Roma. Nine representatives of the Romani community in Germany were asked to compile lists of "pure-blooded" Romanis to be saved from deportation. However, the Germans often ignored these lists, and some individuals identified on them were still sent to concentration camps. Notable internment and concentration camps include Dachau, Dieselstrasse, Marzahn (which evolved from a municipal internment camp) and Vennhausen.

Initially, Romani were herded into so-called ghettos, including the Warsaw Ghetto (April–June 1942), where they formed a distinct class in relation to the Jews. Ghetto diarist Emmanuel Ringelblum speculated that Romani were sent to the Warsaw Ghetto because the Germans wanted:

... to toss into the Ghetto everything that is characteristically dirty, shabby, bizarre, of which one ought to be frightened, and which anyway has to be destroyed.

Initially, there was disagreement within the Nazi circles about how to solve the "Gypsy Question". In late 1939 and early 1940, Hans Frank, the General Governor of occupied Poland, refused to accept the 30,000 German and Austrian Roma which were to be deported to his territory. Heinrich Himmler "lobbied to save a handful of pure-blooded Roma", whom he believed to be an ancient Aryan people for his "ethnic reservation", but was opposed by Martin Bormann, who favored deportation for all Roma. The debate ended in 1942 when Himmler signed the order to begin the mass deportations of Roma to Auschwitz concentration camp. During Operation Reinhard (1941–1943), an undetermined number of Roma were killed in the extermination camps, such as Treblinka. The Einsatzgruppen, mobile killing units of the SS, murdered tens of thousands of Roma in the German occupied Soviet territories.

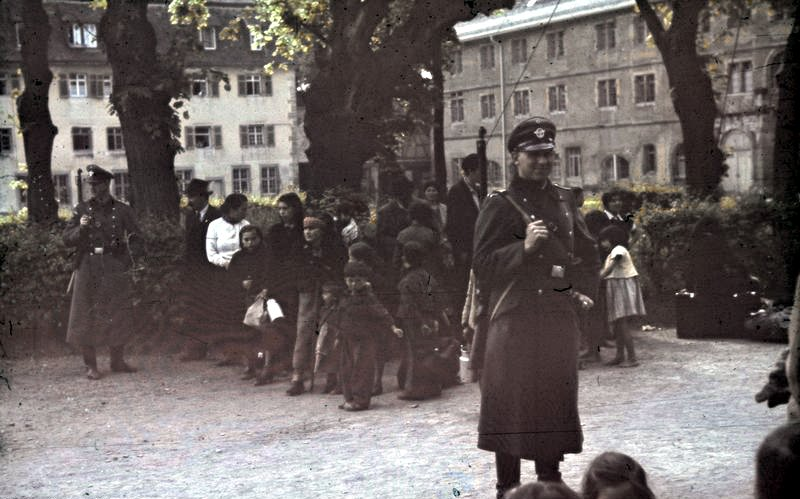
German troops round up Romani in Asperg, Germany, in May 1940

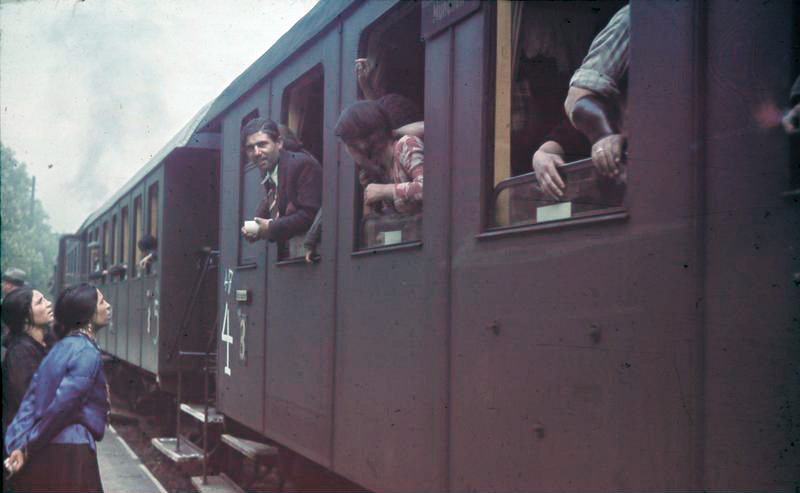
Deportation from Asperg

The Nazi persecution of Roma was not regionally consistent. In France, between 3,000 and 6,000 Roma were deported to German concentration camps as Dachau, Ravensbrück, Buchenwald, and other camps. Further east, in the Balkan states and the Soviet Union, the Einsatzgruppen, mobile killing squads, travelled from village to village massacring the inhabitants where they lived and typically leaving few to no records of the number of Roma killed in this way. In a few cases, significant documentary evidence of mass murder was generated. Timothy Snyder notes that in the Soviet Union alone there were 8,000 documented cases of Roma murdered by the Einsatzgruppen in their sweep east.

In return for immunity from prosecution for war crimes, Erich von dem Bach-Zelewski stated at the Einsatzgruppen Trial that "the principal task of the Einsatzgruppen of the S.D. was the annihilation of the Jews, Gypsies, and Political commissars". Roma in the Slovak Republic were killed by local collaborating auxiliaries. Notably, in Denmark and Greece, local populations did not participate in the hunt for Roma as they did elsewhere. Bulgaria and Finland, although allies of Germany, did not cooperate with the Porajmos, just as they did not cooperate with the anti-Jewish Shoah.

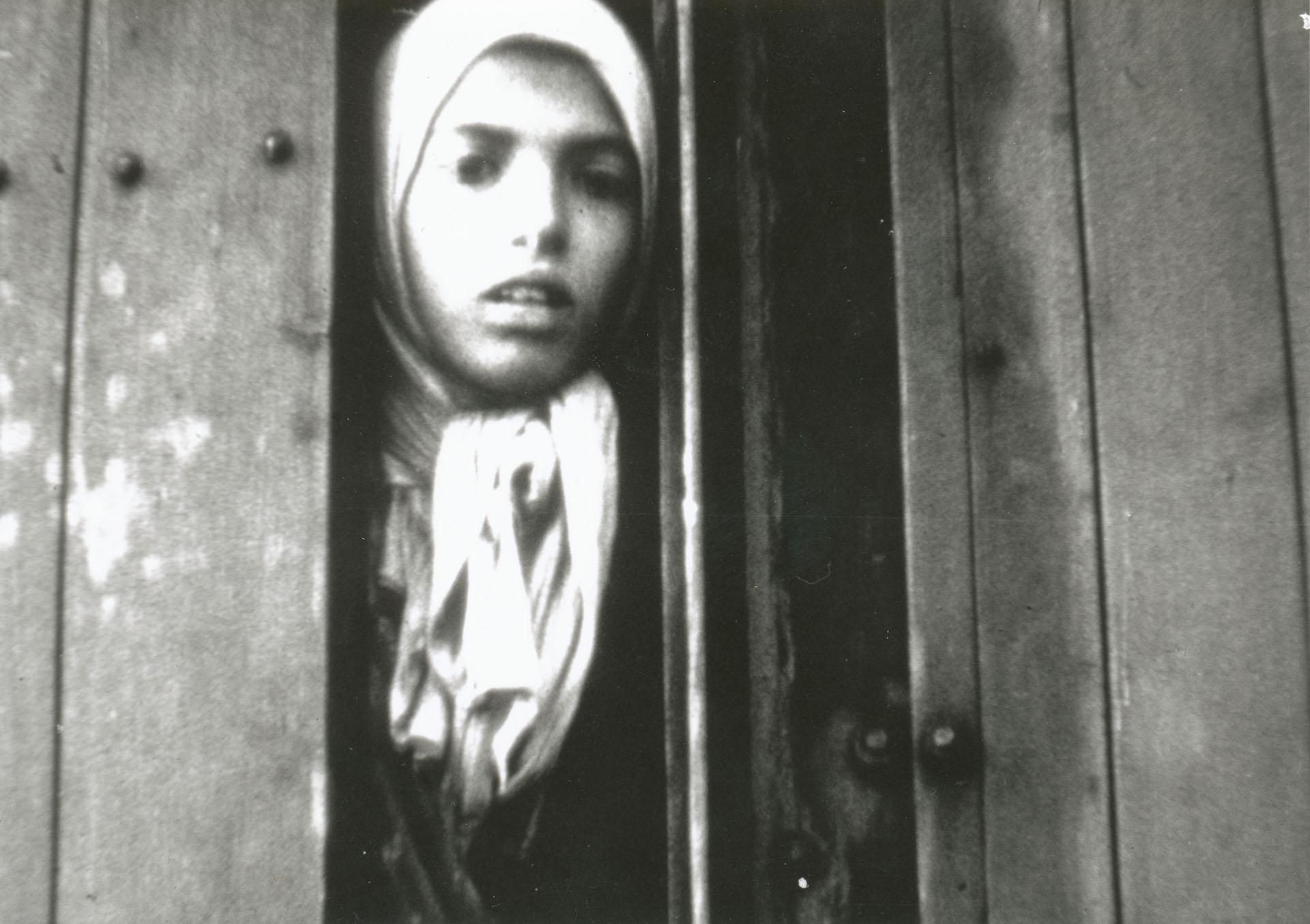
An image of 10-year-old Settela Steinbach, a Dutch Romani girl on a train to Auschwitz in 1944, became an icon of children in the Holocaust.

On 16 December 1942, Himmler ordered that the Romani candidates for extermination should be transferred from ghettos to the extermination facilities of Auschwitz-Birkenau. On 15 November 1943, Himmler ordered that Romani and "part-Romanies" were to be put "on the same level as Jews and placed in concentration camps". The camp authorities housed Roma in a special compound that was called the "Gypsy family camp". Some 23,000 Roma, Sinti, and Lalleri were deported to Auschwitz altogether. In concentration camps such as Auschwitz, Roma wore brown or black triangular patches, the symbol for "asocials", or green ones, the symbol for professional criminals, and less frequently the letter "Z" (meaning Zigeuner, German word for gypsy).

Sybil Milton, a scholar of Nazi Germany and the Holocaust, has speculated that Hitler was involved in the decision to deport all Romani to Auschwitz, as Himmler gave the order six days after meeting with Hitler. For that meeting, Himmler had prepared a report on the subject Führer: Aufstellung wer sind Zigeuner.

On some occasions, the Roma attempted to resist the Nazis' extermination. In May 1944 at Auschwitz, SS guards tried to liquidate the Gypsy family camp and were "met with unexpected resistance". When ordered to come out, they refused, having been warned and arming themselves with crude weapons: iron pipes, shovels and other tools. The SS chose not to confront the Roma directly and withdrew for several months. After transferring as many as 3,000 Roma who were capable of forced labor to Auschwitz I and other concentration camps, the SS moved against the remaining 2,898 inmates on 2 August. The SS murdered nearly all of the remaining inmates, most of them ill, elderly men, women and children, in the gas chambers of Birkenau. At least 19,000 of the 23,000 Roma sent to Auschwitz were murdered there.

Romani women were subjected to rape and sexual abuse by Nazi guards and officials.

The Romani population was subjected to exploitation and enslavement by the Nazis, who forced them to provide slave labor in German factories and workshops.

=== Estimated number of victims ===
According to historian Anton Weiss-Wendt, "due to the lack of reliable statistics on the size of prewar Romani population for each country and Europe as a whole, the estimates of the death toll vary greatly, from 96,000 to 500,000, with the likely figure in excess of 200,000".

The United States Holocaust Memorial Museum cites scholars who estimate the number of Sinti and Roma murdered as between 220,000 and 500,000. The Columbia Guide to the Holocaust estimates that between 135,000 to 285,000 Roma people were killed by the Nazis in Germany, Axis countries and occupied territories. Political scientist and statistician Rudolph Rummel estimated that 258,000 were killed by the Nazi regime in Europe, 36,000 in Romania under Ion Antonescu and 27,000 in Ustaše-controlled Croatia.

The Society for Threatened Peoples estimates the Romani deaths at 277,100. Martin Gilbert estimates that more than 220,000 of Europe's 700,000 Romani population were murdered, including 15,000 (mainly from the Soviet Union) at Mauthausen in January–May 1945.

Ian Hancock, Romani political advocate and researcher has controversially argued that as many as 1.5 million Romani died in the holocaust. Hancock contends that the entire Romani population was killed in Croatia, Estonia, Lithuania, Luxembourg, and the Netherlands. In a 2010 publication, Hancock believes that Nazi's grouped Romani victims under headings such as "remainder to be liquidated", "hangers-on", and "partisans", resulting in an underestimated death toll. He cites the previously obscure Lety concentration camp in the Czech Republic, and Ackovic's revised estimates of Romani killed by the Ustaše as high as 80,000–100,000.

German historian Karola Fings has described the 1.5 million estimate as "untenable". Historian David Gaunt described Hancock's estimate as "not supported up by any documentation", and notes that the pre-war Romani population was approximately 1 million. According to Guant, "in general, historians use the figure of just above 200,000, while most activists have settled on the figure of 500,000". Historian Zoltan Barany states that estimates between 200,000 and 275,000 are "more credible" than higher estimates, writing "most importantly, it is clear that tens of thousands of human beings were murdered for no other reason than being Gypsies".

According to Fings, "Today, the figure of 200,000 is mostly taken as a reference point, even though the empirical basis remains incomplete and further research could result in an upward revision".

== Persecution in other Axis and occupied countries ==
The governments of some Nazi German allies, namely Slovakia, Finland, Italy, Vichy France, and Romania, also contributed to the Nazi plan to exterminate the Romani, but most of the Romani who resided in these countries survived, unlike those Romani who resided in Ustaše Croatia or those Romani who resided in areas which were directly ruled by Nazi Germany (such as occupied Poland). The Hungarian Arrow Cross government deported between 28,000 and 33,000 Romani out of a population that was estimated to be around 70,000.

=== Independent State of Croatia ===
The Romani people were also persecuted by the puppet regimes that cooperated with the Third Reich during the war, especially by the notorious Ustaše regime in the Independent State of Croatia. Tens of thousands of Romani people were killed in the Jasenovac concentration camp, along with Serbs, Jews, Bosniaks and Croats. Yad Vashem estimates that the Porajmos was most intense in Yugoslavia, where around 90,000 Romani were killed. The Ustaše government virtually annihilated the country's Romani population, killing an estimated 25,000 and also deporting around 26,000.

In May 1942, an Ustaše order was issued proclaiming that the deportation of Muslim Roma who were residing in Bosnia and Herzegovina was to stop.

On 24 April 1945, Ustaše soldiers brutally murdered between 43 and 47 Sinti and Roma members of a traveling circus named "Braća Winter" as they temporarily settled in Kraj Donji on their way to Slovenia. The atrocity is known as the Hrastina Massacre and is perhaps the last mass murder of Sinti and Roma in Europe during World War II. In 1977, a statue was erected in the local cemetery, Marija Gorica, to honor the victims.

=== Serbia ===
In the Territory of the Military Commander in Serbia, the German occupiers and the Serbian collaborationist puppet government killed thousands of Romani in the Banjica concentration camp, Crveni Krst concentration camp and Topovske Šupe concentration camp along with Jews. In August 1942, Harald Turner reported to his superiors that "Serbia is the only country in which the Jewish question and the Gypsy question have been solved."

Serbian Romani were parties to the unsuccessful class action suit against the Vatican Bank and others in the U.S. federal court in which they sought the return of wartime loot.

=== Romania ===
The Romanian government of Ion Antonescu did not systematically annihilate Roma who resided on its territory. Some resident Roma were deported to occupied Transnistria. Of the estimated 25,000 Romani inmates of these camps, around 11,000 (44%, or almost half) died.

=== Italy ===
In Fascist Italy, as well as in Slovenia and Montenegro, territories which were under Italian occupation, the majority of the Roma were forcibly rounded up and incarcerated in concentration camps, Many of them were deported to Sardinia, with many of them being given Italian identity cards that put them out of reach of extermination by the Nazis and the Ustaše. As a result, the vast majority of the Roma who resided in Italy and its occupied territories managed to survive the war.

=== Protectorate of Bohemia and Moravia ===
In the Protectorate of Bohemia and Moravia, Romani internees were sent to the Lety and Hodonín concentration camps before they were transferred to Auschwitz-Birkenau for mass murder – by poison gas. What makes the Lety camp unique is the fact that it was staffed by Czech guards, who could be even more brutal than the Germans, as testified to in Paul Polansky's book Black Silence. The genocide was so thorough, that the vast majority of Romani who currently reside in the Czech Republic are actually the descendants of migrants who moved from Slovakia to what was then Czechoslovakia and would become the Czech Republic during the post-war years.

Approximately 90% of Romani in the protectorate were murdered during the Holocaust. The population reduction was so great that Bohemian Romani, the dialect of Romani spoken by the Romani people of Bohemia, went extinct after the war.

=== France ===
Between 16,000 and 18,000 Romani from Nazi-occupied France were killed in German camps.

=== Denmark ===
The small Romani population in Denmark was not subjected to mass killings by the Nazi occupiers; instead, it was simply classified as "asocial". Angus Fraser attributes this to "doubts over ethnic demarcations within the travelling population".

=== Greece ===
The Romanis of Greece were taken hostage and prepared for deportation to Auschwitz, but they were saved by appeals from the Archbishop of Athens and the Greek Prime Minister.

=== Norway ===
In 1934, 68 Romani, most of them Norwegian citizens, were denied entry into Norway, and they were also denied transit through Sweden and Denmark when they wanted to leave Germany. In the winter of 1943–1944, 66 members of the Josef, Karoli, and Modis families were interned in Belgium and deported to the gypsy department in Auschwitz. Only four members of this group survived.

=== Crimea ===
In Crimea, the Muslim Roma were protected by the Crimean Tatars from assassination. However, it later served Stalin to deport the Crimean Muslim Romani along with the Crimean Tatars to Siberia, since they were registered as Tatars.

== Medical experiments ==
Another distinctive feature of both the Porajmos and the Holocaust was the extensive use of human subjects in medical experiments. The most notorious of these physicians was Josef Mengele, who worked in the Auschwitz concentration camp. The full extent of his work will never be known because the truckload of records which he sent to Otmar von Verschuer at the Kaiser Wilhelm Institute was destroyed by von Verschuer. Subjects who survived Mengele's experiments were almost always murdered and dissected shortly afterwards. One Roma survivor of medical experimentation was Margarethe Kraus.

== Recognition and remembrance ==
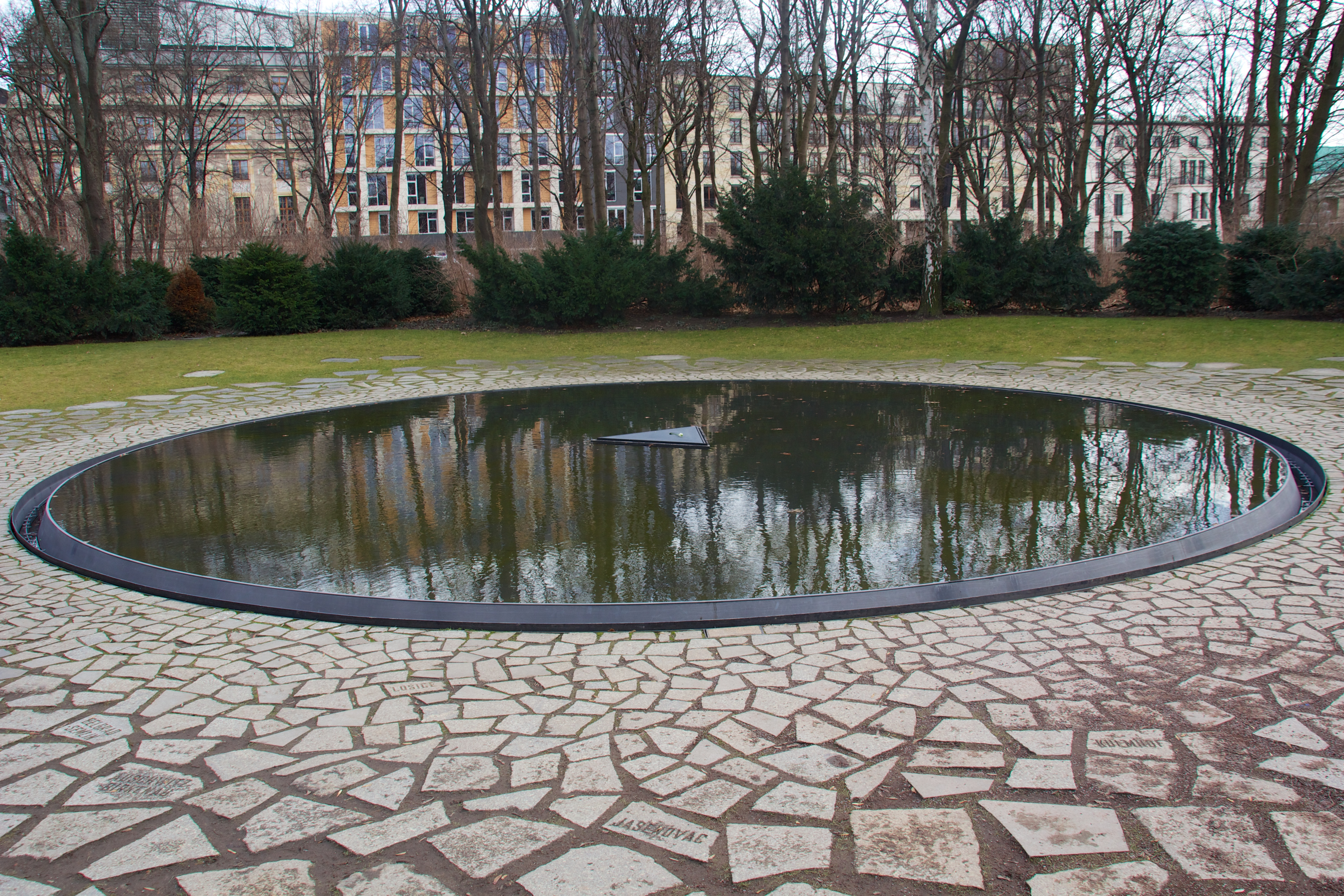
Memorial to the Sinti and Roma Victims of the Nazis in Berlin, Germany

The German government paid war reparations to Jewish survivors of the Holocaust, but not to the Romani. There were "never any consultations at Nuremberg or any other international conference as to whether the Sinti and Roma were entitled like the Jews to reparations." The Interior Ministry of Wuerttemberg argued that "Gypsies [were] persecuted under the Nazis not for any racial reason but because of an asocial and criminal record". When on trial for his leadership of Einsatzgruppen in the USSR, Otto Ohlendorf cited the massacres of Roma people during the Thirty Years' War as a historical precedent.

The European Roma Rights Centre in 2017 gave more details of the chronology of recognition and reparations:

After World War II Roma were also excluded from the right to restitution, because Federal German authorities denied that Roma were persecued due to racist reasons. After a small step in this direction in 1963, restitutions became possible in small amounts only in 1979, when the West German Federal Parliament declared that the Nazi persecution of Roma was based on racial grounds and Roma survivors were allowed to claim for restitution in a form of a onetime payment. The official acceptance of the Porajmos as genocide by the Federal Republic of Germany followed only in 1982 with a speech by Chancelor Helmut Schmidt. In August 2016, an agreement between the German Ministry for Finance and the Foreign Ministry of the Czech Republic decided on compensation for survivors of the Porajmos in the Czech Republic. This agreement, which will give 2,500 EUR to each of the handful of survivors, was greeted as a symbolic acknowledgment, but also criticised for its delay and the low amount awarded. However, this agreement has already led to renewed claims from Romani victims from the former Yugoslavia and other regions of 'romocide'.

In the historiography of East Germany (GDR), the persecution of Sinti and Roma under National Socialism was largely taboo. The German historian Anne-Kathleen Tillack-Graf states that in the GDR, Sinti and Roma were not mentioned as concentration camp prisoners during the official commemorations of the liberation at the three national memorial sites Buchenwald, Sachsenhausen, and Ravensbrück, just like homosexuals, Jehovah's Witnesses and asocial detainees. West Germany recognised the genocide of the Roma in 1982, and since then the Porajmos has been increasingly recognized as a genocide committed simultaneously with the Shoah. The American historian Sybil Milton wrote several articles arguing that the Porajmos deserved recognition as part of the Holocaust. In Switzerland, a committee of experts investigated the policy of the Swiss government during the Porajmos.

Nico Fortuna, a sociologist and Roma activist, explained the distinction between Jewish collective memory of the Holocaust and the Roma experience:

There is a difference between the Jewish and Roma deportees ... The Jews were shocked and can remember the year, date and time it happened. The Roma shrugged it off. They said, "Of course I was deported. I'm Roma; these things happen to a Roma." The Roma mentality is different from the Jewish mentality. For example, a Roma came to me and asked, "Why do you care so much about these deportations? Your family was not deported." I went, "I care as a Roma" and the guy said back, "I do not care because my family were brave, proud Roma that were not deported."
For the Jews it was total and everyone knew this—from bankers to pawnbrokers. For the Roma it was selective and not comprehensive. The Roma were only exterminated in a few parts of Europe such as Poland, the Netherlands, Germany and France. In Romania and much of the Balkans, only nomadic Roma and social outcast Roma were deported. This matters and influences the Roma mentality.

Ian Hancock has also observed a reluctance among Roma to acknowledge their victimization by the Third Reich. The Roma "are traditionally not disposed to keeping alive the terrible memories from their history—nostalgia is a luxury for others". The effects of the illiteracy, the lack of social institutions, and the rampant discrimination faced by Roma in Europe today have produced a people who, according to Fortuna, lack a "national consciousness ... and historical memory of the Holocaust because there is no Roma elite."

=== Acts of commemoration ===
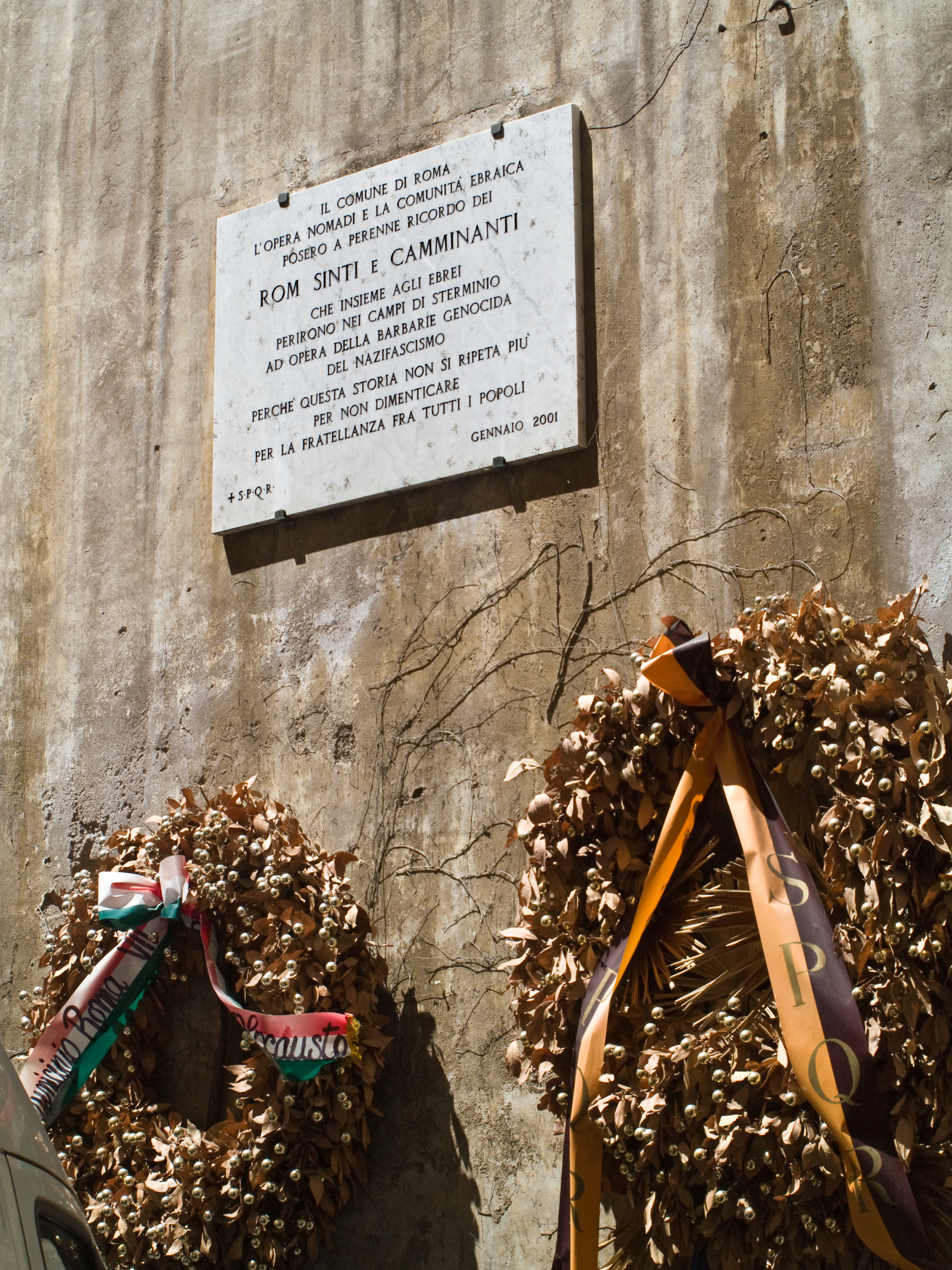
Plaque in Rome, Italy, in memory of Romani people murdered in extermination camps

Holocaust by bullet, Yahad-In Unum documentary

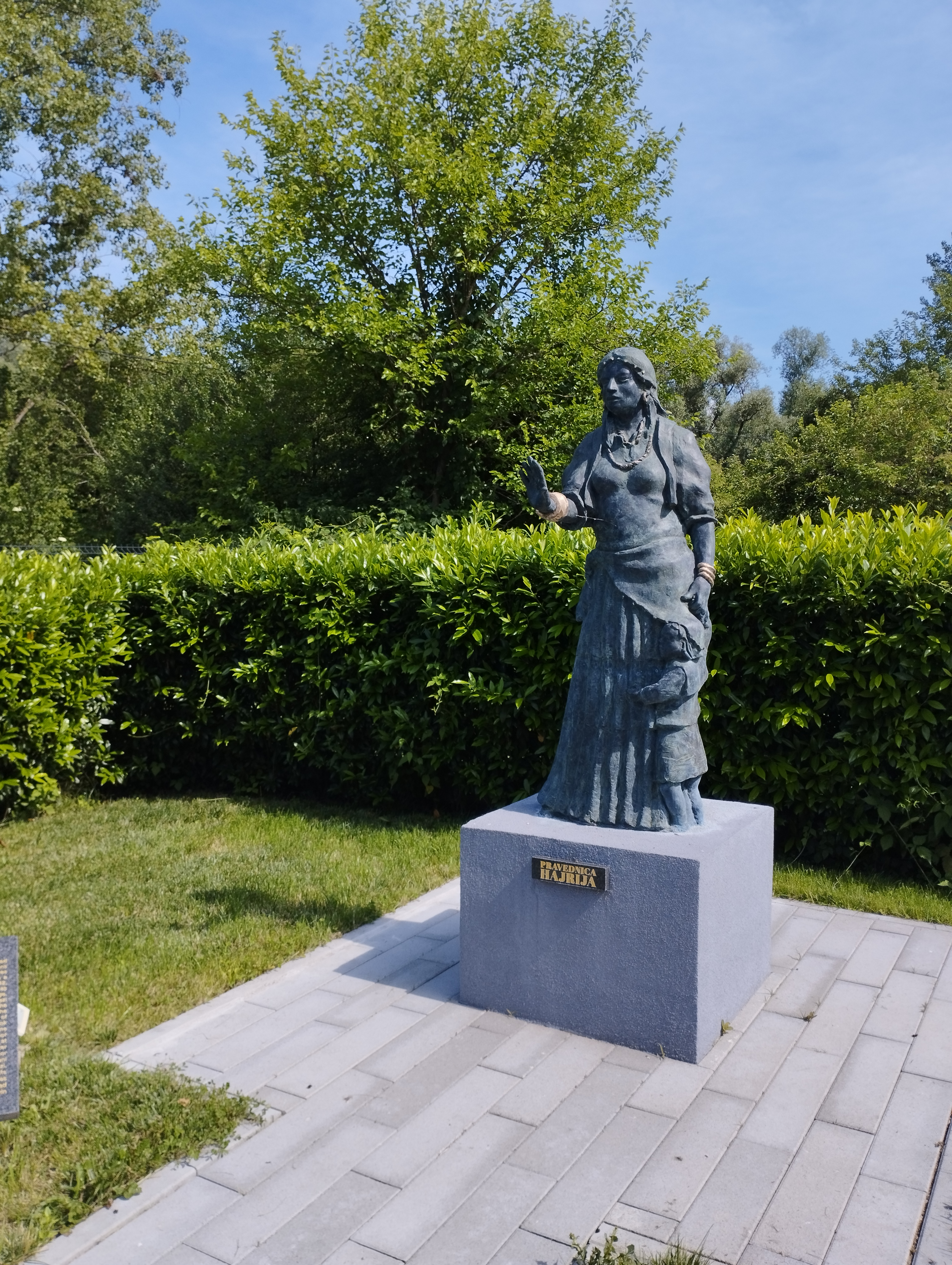
Memorial to Righteous Among the Nations Hajrija Imeri Mihaljić at the Roma Memorial Center Uštica

The first memorial which commemorates victims of the Romani Holocaust was erected on 8 May 1956, in the Polish village of Szczurowa commemorating the Szczurowa massacre. Since 1996, a Gypsy Caravan Memorial has been traveling among the main remembrance sites in Poland, from Tarnów via Auschwitz, Szczurowa and Borzęcin Dolny, gathering the Romani and well-wishers in the remembrance of the Porajmos. Several museums dedicate a part of their permanent exhibition to documenting that history, such as the Museum of Romani Culture in Czech Republic and the Ethnographic Museum in Tarnów in Poland. Some political organisations have tried to block the installation of Romani memorials near former concentration camps, as shown by the debate over Lety and Hodonin in the Czech Republic.

On 23 October 2007, President Traian Băsescu publicly apologized for his nation's role in the Porajmos, the first time a Romanian leader has done so. He called for the Porajmos to be taught in schools, stating that, "We must tell our children that six decades ago children like them were sent by the Romanian state to die of hunger and cold". Part of his apology was expressed in the Romani language. Băsescu awarded three Porajmos survivors with an Order for Faithful Service. Before recognizing Romania's role in the Porajmos, Traian Băsescu was widely quoted after an incident on 19 May 2007, in which he insulted a journalist by calling her a "stinky gypsy". The president subsequently apologized.

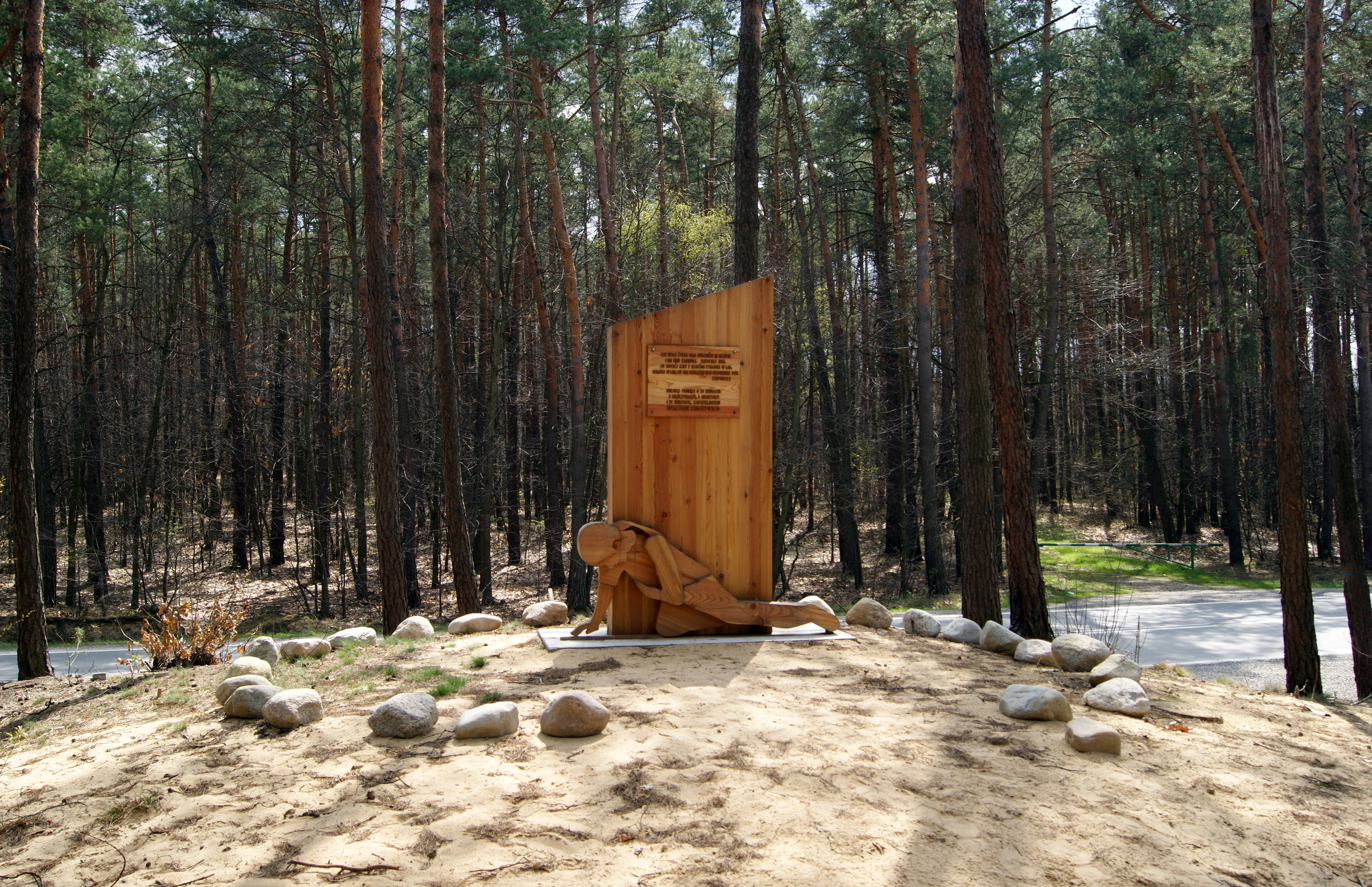
Monument to the memory of the Romani Holocaust in the site of German crime in 1943, in the Polish village of Borzęcin.

On 27 January 2011, Zoni Weisz became the first Roma guest of honour at Germany's official Holocaust Memorial Day ceremony. Dutch-born Weisz escaped death during a Nazi round-up when a policeman allowed him to escape. Nazi injustices against the Roma were recalled at the ceremony, including that directed at Sinto boxer Johann Trollmann.

In July 2011, the Polish Parliament passed a resolution for the official recognition of 2 August as a day of commemoration of the genocide.

On 5 May 2012, the world premiere of the Requiem for Auschwitz, by composer Roger Moreno Rathgeb, was performed at the Nieuwe Kerk in Amsterdam by The Roma and Sinti Philharmoniker directed by Riccardo M Sahiti. The Philharmoniker is a pan-European orchestra of Roma and Sinto musicians generally employed by other classical orchestras; it is focused on the contribution of Roma culture to classical music. Dutch-Swiss Sinto Moreno Rathgeb wrote his requiem for all victims of Auschwitz and Nazi terror. The occasion of the premiere was coupled to a conference, Roma between Past and Future. The requiem has since been performed in Tilburg, Prague, Budapest, Frankfurt, Kraków, and Berlin.

On 24 October 2012, the Memorial to the Sinti and Roma Victims of National Socialism was unveiled in Berlin. Since 2010, ternYpe – International Roma Youth Network has organized a commemoration week called "Dikh he na bister" (look and don't forget) about 2 August in Kraków and Auschwitz-Birkenau. In 2014 they organised the largest Youth Commemoration Ceremony in history, attracting more than 1000 young Roma and non-Roma from 25 countries. This initiative of ternYpe Network was held under the European Parliament's High Patronage granted by President Martin Schulz.

Roma Resistance Day is observed on 16 May to commemorate the 1944 uprising of Romani prisoners at the Auschwitz-Birkenau concentration camp against their Nazi oppressors. This day pays tribute to the Roma's struggle for survival and dignity during the Holocaust.

On August 2, 2020 Roma Memorial Center Uštica, located near Jasenovac concentration camp memorial area in Croatia, was opened as a memorial site for thousands of Roma executed by the Ustaše regime.

=== In popular culture ===
- In the 2011 documentary film, A People Uncounted: The Untold Story of the Roma, filmmaker Aaron Yeger chronicles the rich, yet difficult history of the Romani people, from ancient times to the Romani genocide which was perpetrated by the Nazis during WWII, and then, it chronicles the history of the Romani people from the end of World War II to the present day. Romani Holocaust survivors share their raw, authentic stories of life in the concentration camps, providing first-hand accounts of this minority group's experience, a subject which the public does not know about.
- In 2009, Tony Gatlif, a French Romani film director, directed the film Korkoro, which portrays the Romani Taloche's escape from the Nazis, with help from a French notary, Justes, and his difficulty in trying to lead a sedentary life. The film's other main character, Mademoiselle Lise Lundi, is inspired by Yvette Lundy, a teacher who worked in Gionges and was active in the French Resistance.
- The 1988 Polish film, And the Violins Stopped Playing, also has the Porajmos as its subject. It was criticized for showing the killing of Roma as a method of removing witnesses of the killing of Jews.
- A scene in the French-language film Train de Vie (Train of Life), directed by Radu Mihaileanu, depicts a group of Romani singing and dancing with Jews at a stop en route to a concentration camp.
- In the graphic X-Men novel The Magneto Testament, Max Eisenhardt, who would later become Magneto, has a crush on a Romani girl who is named Magda. He later meets her again in Auschwitz, where she is in the Gypsy Camp and together, they plan their escape. The Porajmos is described in detail.
- In 2019, Roz Mortimer directed The Deathless Woman, a 'hybrid-documentary' film which is both a ghost story and a record of first person testimonies about historical crimes which were committed against the Roma during WWII (and contemporary crimes). The ghostly narrator, voiced in Romani by Iveta Kokyová, questions the absence of her history in archives and museums.

=== Literature ===
Several survivors of the Romani Holocaust wrote about their experiences. They include: Philomena Franz, Otto Rosenberg, Ceija Stojka, Walter Winter, Alfred Lessing, and others. The first of these works appeared in the 1980s as silence over the impact of the holocaust on Romani communities began to be discussed.

== Alternate terms ==
The term porajmos (also porrajmos or pharrajimos—literally, "devouring" or "destruction" in some dialects of the Romani language) was introduced by Ian Hancock in the early 1990s. Hancock chose to use the term, coined by a Kalderash Rom, from a number of suggestions which were given during an "informal conversation in 1993".

The term is mostly used by activists and as a result, its usage is unknown to most Roma, including relatives of victims and survivors. Some Russian and Balkan Romani activists protest against the use of the word porajmos. In various dialects, porajmos is synonymous with poravipe which means "violation" and "rape", a term which some Roma consider offensive. János Bársony and Ágnes Daróczi, pioneering organisers of the Romani civil rights movement in Hungary, prefer to use the term Pharrajimos, a Romani word which means "cutting up", "fragmentation", "destruction". They argue against the use of the term porrajmos, saying that it is marhime (unclean, untouchable): "[p]orrajmos is unpronounceable in the Roma community, and thus, it is incapable of conveying the sufferings of the Roma". Indologist Franz-Elias Schneck argues that "por-" might be related to the Sanskrit word वार (vāra), meaning "blow" or "assault". Even within the Roma community, the word either does not exist or is a distortion of the usage of "blow", which undermines the remembrance of the Roma Holocaust.

Balkan Romani activists prefer to use the term samudaripen ("mass killing"), first introduced by linguist Marcel Courthiade in the 1970s in Yugoslavia in the context of Auschwitz and Jasenovac. It is a neologism of sa (Romani for 'all') and mudaripen (murder). It can be translated as 'murder of all' or 'mass murder'. The International Romani Union now uses this term. Ian Hancock dismisses this word, arguing that it does not conform to Romani language morphology. Some Ruska Roma activists offer to use the term Kali Traš ("Black Fear"). Another alternative that has been used is Berša Bibahtale ("The Unhappy Years").

Linguistically, the term porajmos is composed of the verb root porrav- and the abstract-forming nominal ending -imos. This ending is of the Vlax Romani dialect, whereas other varieties generally use -ibe(n) or -ipe(n). For the verb itself, the most commonly given meaning is "to open/stretch wide" or "to rip open", whereas the meaning "to open up the mouth, devour" occurs in fewer dialects.

== See also ==
- Rescue of Roma during the Porajmos
- Roma Holocaust Memorial Day
- Gypsy family camp (Auschwitz)
- Anti-Romani sentiment
- Persecution of Dalits
- Romani studies
- Romani people
- Great Gypsy Round-up
