= Deportations of Romani people to Transnistria =

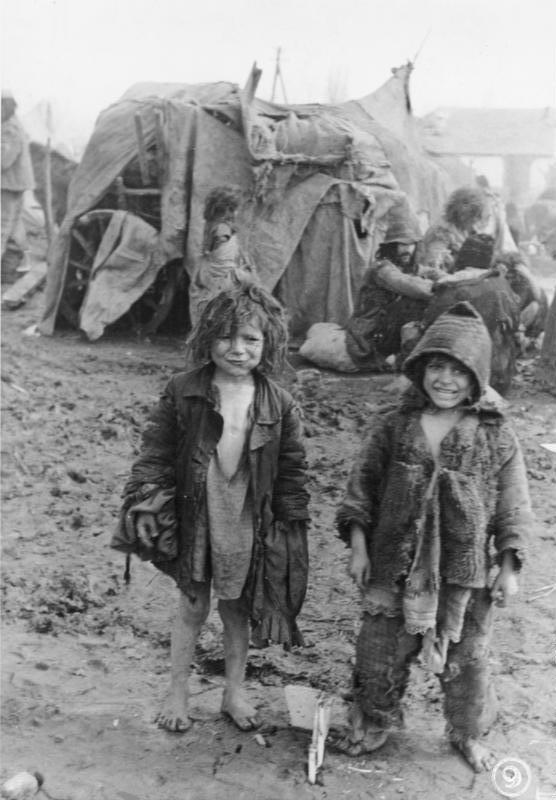
Romani children in Tiraspol in April 1944, shortly after the returning of Transnistria to the Soviet Union

During the Ion Antonescu regime, in the context of the Romani genocide, more than 25,000 Romani people from the Kingdom of Romania were deported to concentration camps in the Transnistria Governorate. The regime deemed Romani people "a burden and a danger to public order". In the camps the imprisoned people were used as slave labour, and witnesses described the conditions as abysmal, with many dying from exposure and starvation.

== Preparations ==
One year after the starting of The Holocaust in Romania, Ion Antonescu ordered surveys to assess the Romani population in Romania. The results estimated 208,700 people of Romani ethnicity, out of whom the ones without fixed residence and those deemed "dangerous" - for example those who had previous criminal convictions or even those who were jobless - fell under the criteria for deportation. More than 30,000 people met the criteria. According to researcher Shannon Woodcock the vague labelling of "nomadic" and "non-nomadic dangerous Țigani" by the authorities created confusion in the ranks of Romanian police, some of whom miss-identified travelling Kaldarari, Fierari (iron smiths) and other Romani subgroups as nomadic, even though they were only itinerant in summer in order to sell their goods. Most gendarmerie branches refused to declare any "nomadic or dangerous" Romani in their jurisdiction, prompting the central authorities to call them and insist on providing numbers. Other gendarmeries used the opportunity to abuse the Romani communities, for example the case of Râmnicu Sărat's chief of gendarmes who deported Romani women who were not legally married with their partner.

== Deportation ==
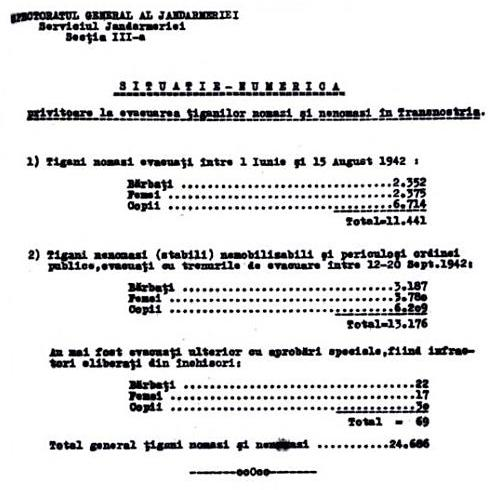
1942 report through which the Romanian Gendarmerie communicates the total number of Romani people deported into Transnistria by the Antonescu regime.

Starting from September 1942, 3 months after the deportation of Jews to Transnistria, more than 13,000 sedentary Romani people were transported by train to the same region, while the remaining - almost equal number - of travellers had to use their own wagons. According to contemporary documents the authorities' original plan was for them to be sent away by water: from the Danube to the Black Sea and up to Odesa Harbor.

The main destinations in the Governorate of Transnistria were Golta, Oceacov, and Berezovca counties. Once they reached their destination the deportees were deprived of food, clothing, and shelter. In those conditions and lacking medical facilities many died in the following winter, mainly of typhus. Estimates are that between 12,000 and 20,000 deportees died in the Romani concentration camps.

== See also ==
- Romani Holocaust
