= Przyborów, Lesser Poland Voivodeship =

Przyborów
- Village
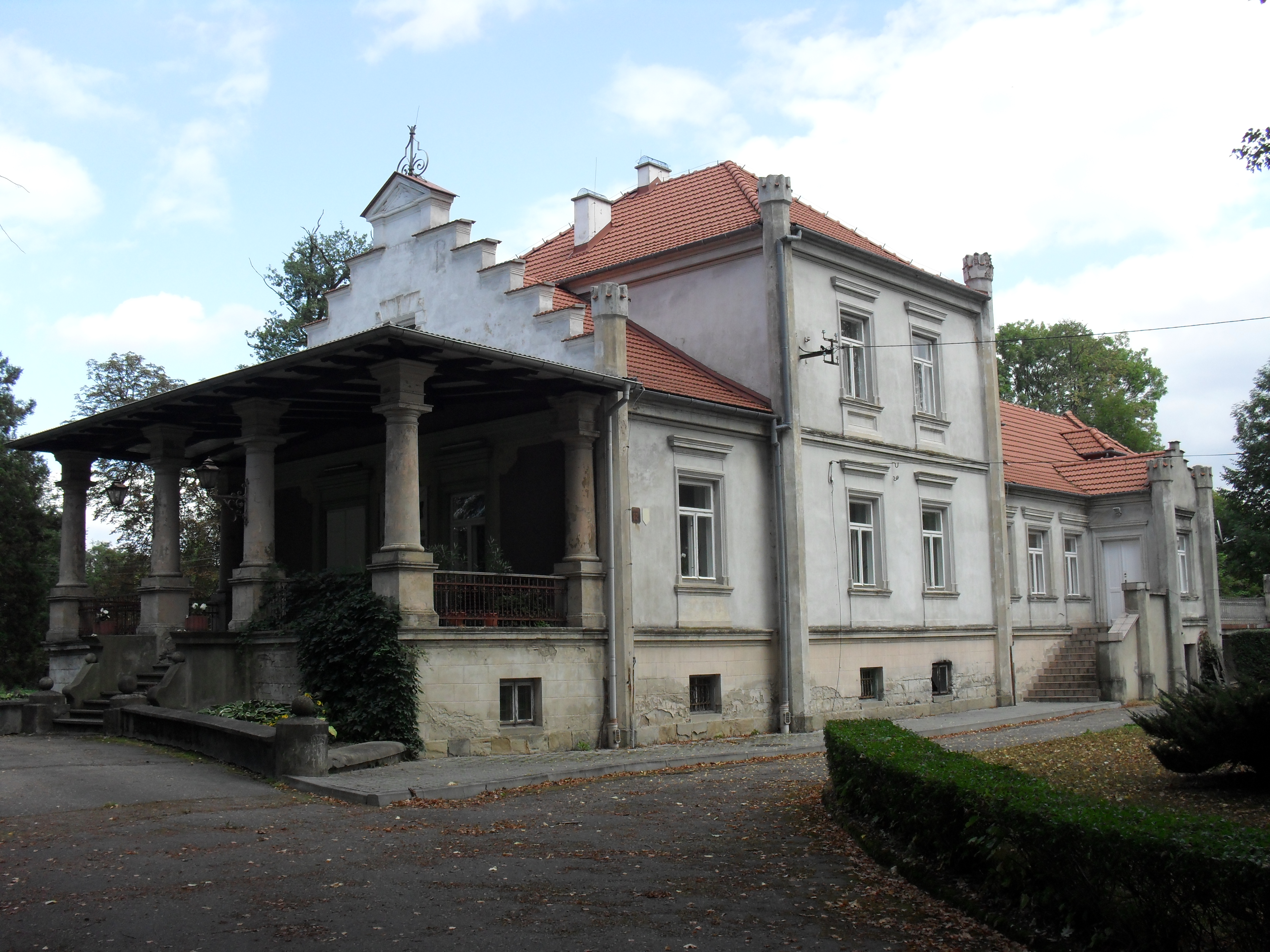
- Manor house

- Location within Poland
- Coordinates: 50°1′48″N 20°39′48″E
- Country: Poland
- Voivodeship: Lesser Poland
- County: Brzesko
- Gmina: Borzęcin
- Population: 1,700

Przyborów [pʂɨˈbɔruf] is a village in the administrative district of Gmina Borzęcin, within Brzesko County, Lesser Poland Voivodeship, in southern Poland.
