= The Deathless Woman =

- Directed by: Roz Mortimer
- Written by: Roz Mortimer
- Produced by: Roz Mortimer
- Starring: Iveta Kokyová; Loren O’Dair; Oliver Malik
- Release date: October 6, 2019
- Running time: 89 minutes
- Country: United Kingdom
- Languages: Romani; English; Hungarian; Polish

The Deathless Woman is a 2019 film by Roz Mortimer which is both a ghost story and a documentary, and which investigates historic and contemporary crimes against the Roma people.

== Plot ==
The Deathless Woman, voiced by Iveta Kokyová in Romani (Lovari dialect), is the ghost of a Roma matriarch who has returned to tell of what she witnessed during World War II and to question the absence of her history in archives and museums. She watches the non-Roma Seeker (Loren O’Dair) investigate her story and more. We also hear first person testimony accounts from real-life witnesses and see fantastic recreations of some scenes, as tableaux vivants.

== Background ==
In an online discussion with Roma Holocaust historian and activist Ágnes Daróczi and Professor of Media at Eötvös Loránd University, András Müllner, Roz Mortimer discusses how discovering Daróczi's book Pharrajimos: The Fate of the Roma During the Holocaust was an important factor in developing the film. She also describes her work with Roma language expert Juice Vamosi who was a consultant and the Romani translator on the film .

== Cast ==
- Iveta Kokyová as the voice of the Deathless Woman
- Loren O’Dair as the Seeker
- Oliver Malik as Boy

== Release ==
The Deathless Woman played at the London Film Festival in 2019. Since then it has screened at various festivals including: Ji.hlava International Documentary Film Festival in Czechia, Borderlines Film Festival in the UK, EBS International Documentary Festival (EIDF) in Korea, B3 Biennial of the Moving Image in Frankfurt, Aesthetica Short Film Festival in the UK, Ake Dikhea? Festival of Romani Film, Rolling Film Festival in Kosovo, Human. It has also streamed online at True Story.

== Reception ==
The Deathless Woman won the Special Jury Award at the Ake Dikhea? Festival of Romani Film. Jury member Lisa Smith described it as “A film with a lot of weight, being both politically and artistically moving." She said "It highlights the need for commemoration and remembrance of the Romani Holocaust victims. It also has a lot of strength in connecting the historical persecution of Romani people with the current day situation.”
