= Waryś =

- Village
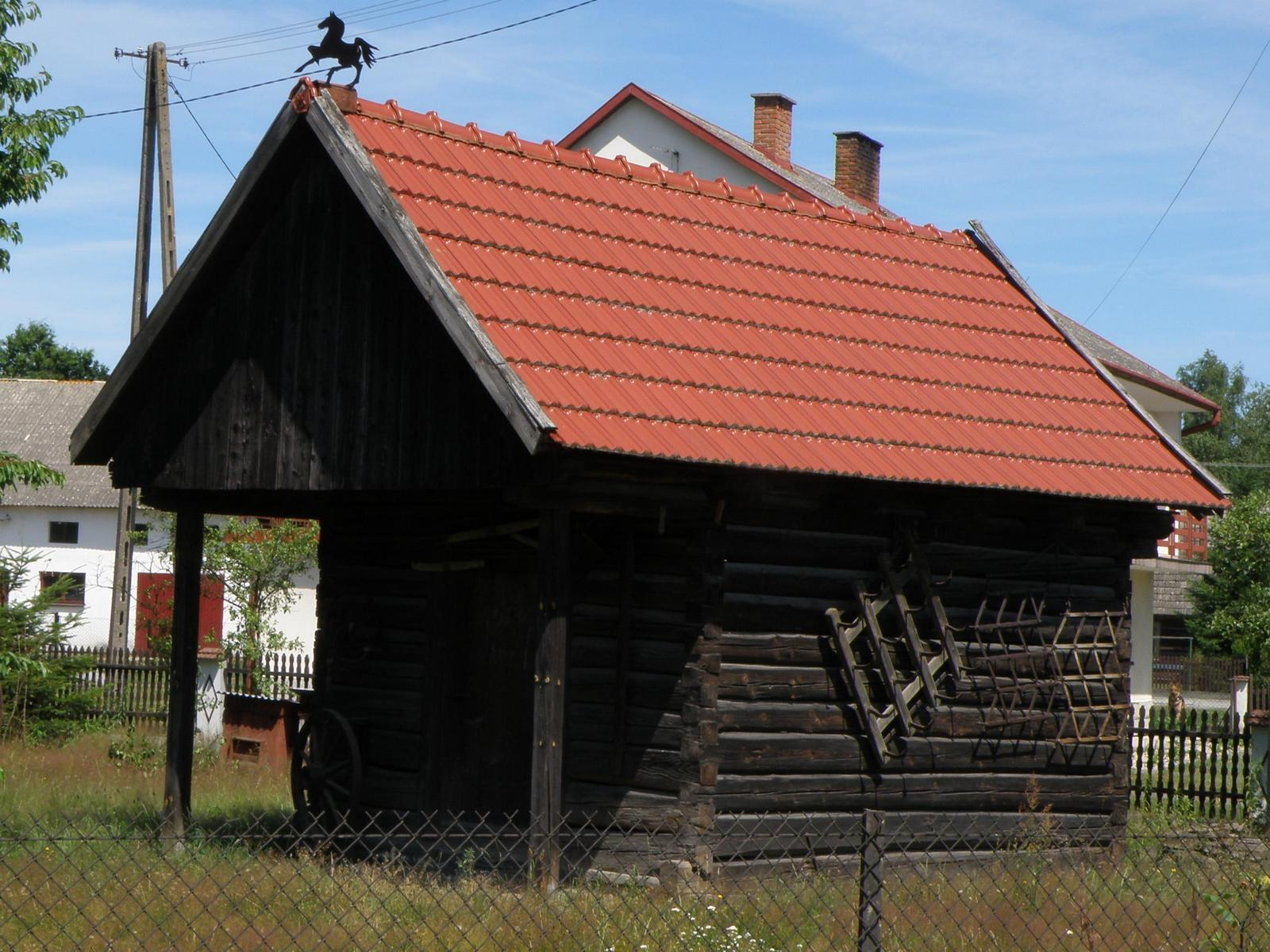

- Location within Poland
- Coordinates: 50°3′N 20°45′E
- Country: Poland
- Voivodeship: Lesser Poland
- County: Brzesko
- Gmina: Borzęcin

Waryś [ˈvarɨɕ] is a village in the administrative district of Gmina Borzęcin, within Brzesko County, Lesser Poland Voivodeship, in southern Poland.
