= Gmina Borzęcin =

Gmina Borzęcin Borzęcin Commune
- Gmina
- Flag Coat of arms
- Interactive map of Gmina Borzęcin
- Coordinates (Borzęcin): 50°4′33″N 20°42′20″E
- Country: Poland
- Voivodeship: Lesser Poland
- County: Brzesko
- Seat: Borzęcin

Area
  - Total: 102.73 km^{2} (39.66 sq mi)

Population (2006)
  - Total: 8,373
  - Density: 81.50/km^{2} (211.1/sq mi)
- Website: http://www.borzecin.pl/

Gmina Borzęcin is a rural gmina (administrative district) in Brzesko County, Lesser Poland Voivodeship, in southern Poland. Its seat is the village of Borzęcin, which lies approximately 14 kilometres (9 mi) north-east of Brzesko and 55 km (34 mi) east of the regional capital Kraków.

The gmina covers an area of 102.73 square kilometres (39.7 sq mi), and as of 2006 its total population is 8,373.

== Villages ==
Gmina Borzęcin contains the villages and settlements of Bielcza, Borzęcin, Jagniówka, Łęki, Przyborów and Waryś.

== Neighbouring gminas ==
Gmina Borzęcin is bordered by the gminas of Brzesko, Dębno, Radłów, Szczurowa, Wierzchosławice and Wojnicz.
