= Bielcza =

- Village
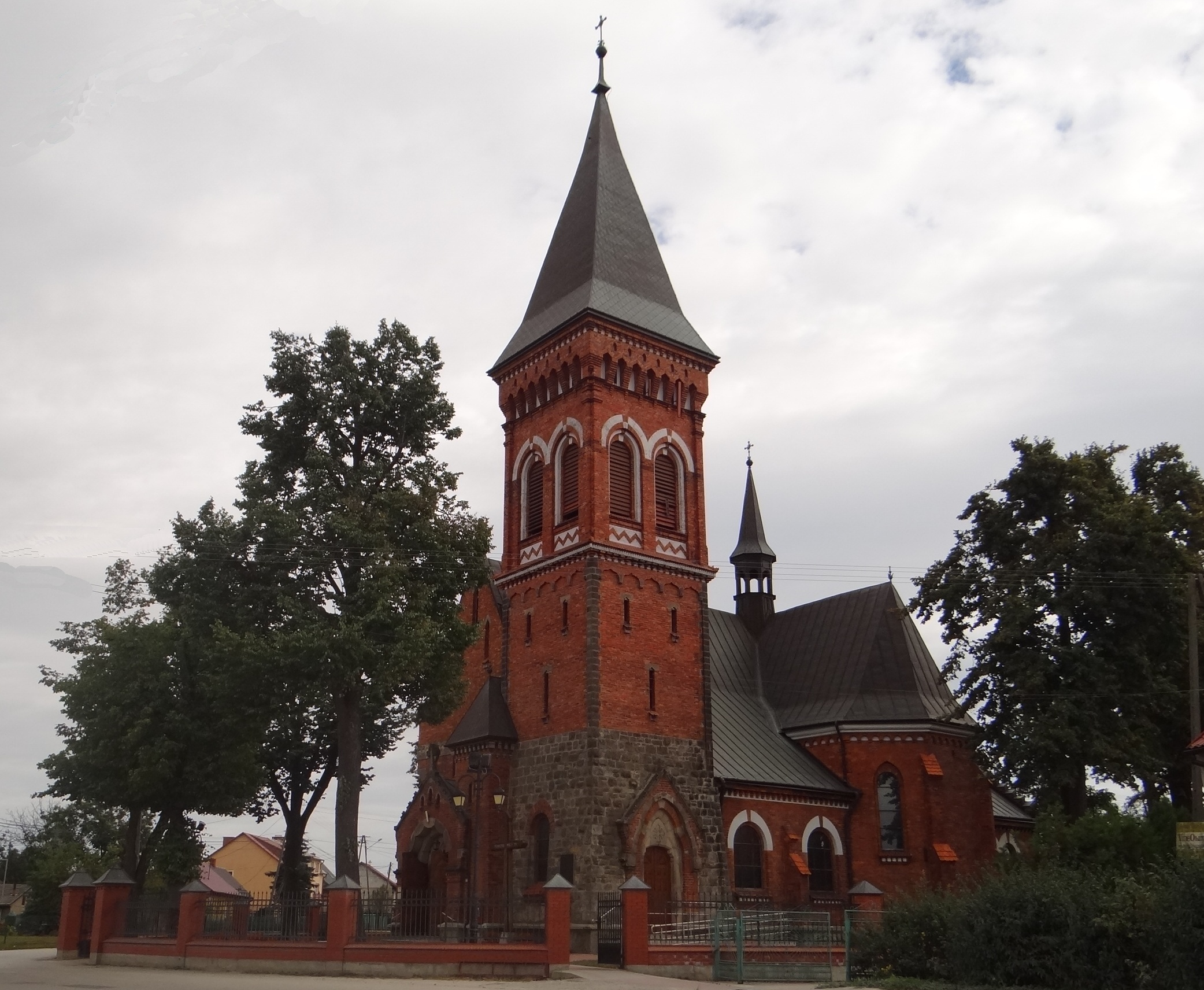
- Catholic church

- Location within Poland
- Coordinates: 50°1′N 20°43′E
- Country: Poland
- Voivodeship: Lesser Poland
- County: Brzesko
- Gmina: Borzęcin
- Population: 1,600

Bielcza [ˈbjɛlt͡ʂa] is a village in the administrative district of Gmina Borzęcin, within Brzesko County, Lesser Poland Voivodeship, in southern Poland.
