= Gypsy family camp (Auschwitz) =

Part of the Auschwitz II-Birkenau concentration camp

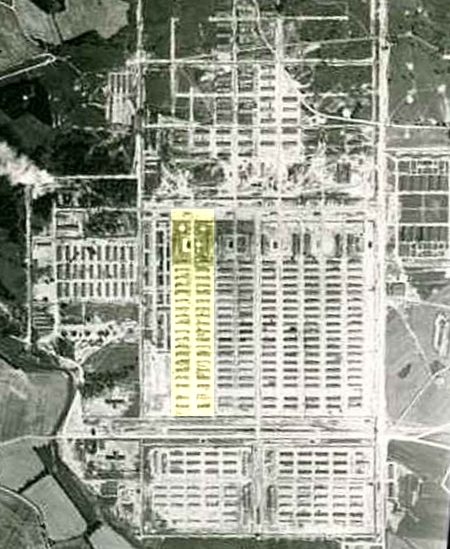
Section B-IIe of Auschwitz highlighted in yellow

The Gypsy family camp (German: Zigeunerfamilienlager) was Section B-IIe of the Auschwitz II-Birkenau concentration camp, where Romani families deported to the camp were held together, instead of being separated as was typical at Auschwitz.

== History ==
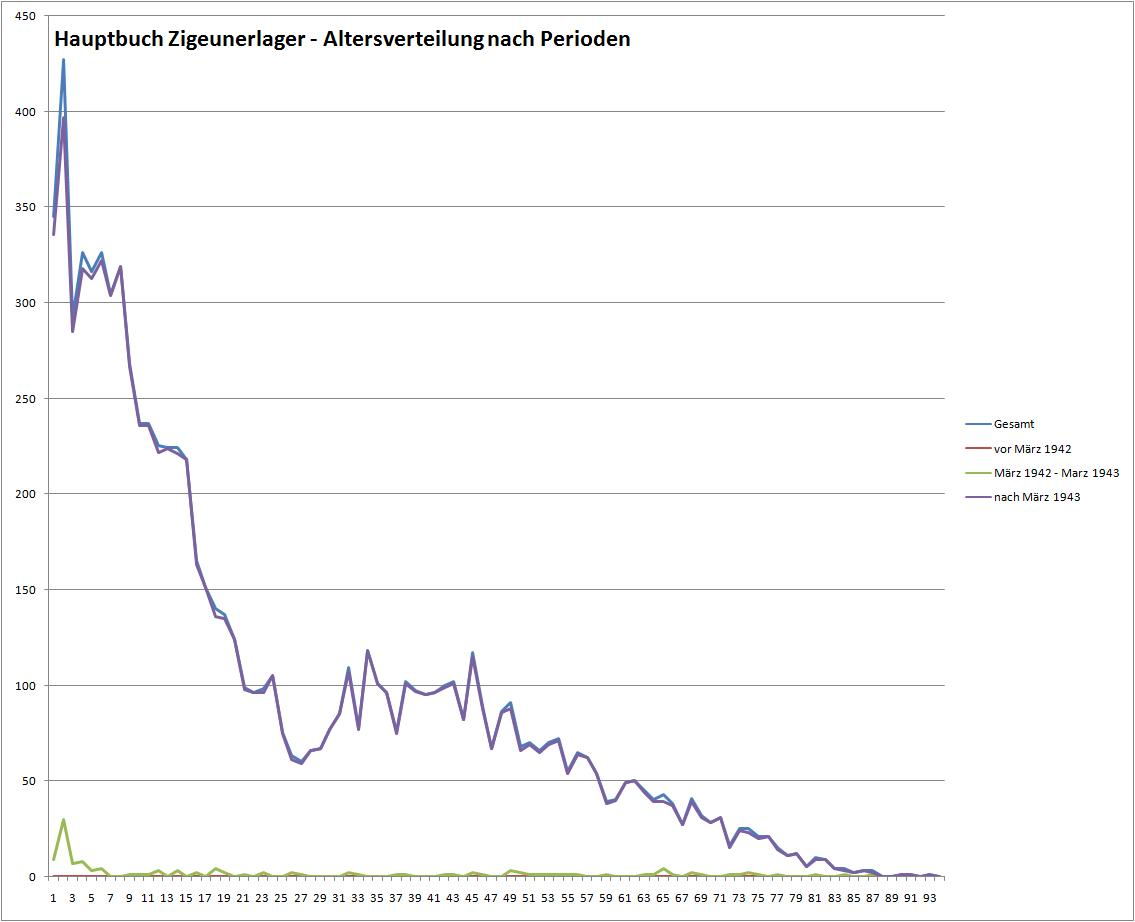
Chart of prisoners' ages

On 10 December 1942, Heinrich Himmler issued an order to send all Romani (German: Zigeuner, "Gypsies") to concentration camps, including Auschwitz. A separate camp was set up at Auschwitz II-Birkenau, classed as Section B-IIe and known as the Zigeunerfamilienlager ("Gypsy family camp"). The first transport of German Roma arrived on 26 February 1943, and was housed in Section B-IIe. Approximately 23,000 Roma had been brought to Auschwitz by 1944, of whom 20,000 died there. One transport of 1,700 Polish Sinti and Roma were killed in the gas chambers upon arrival, as they were suspected to be ill with spotted fever.

Roma and Sinti prisoners were used primarily for construction work. Thousands died of typhus and noma due to overcrowding, poor sanitary conditions, and malnutrition. Anywhere from 1,400 to 3,000 prisoners were transferred to other concentration camps before the murder of the remaining population. (Note: Steinbacher gives a figure of "about 3,000"; Rees states that 1,400 were transferred.)

On 2 August 1944, the SS cleared the camp. A witness in another part of the camp later told of the inmates unsuccessfully battling the SS with improvised weapons before being loaded into trucks. The surviving population (estimated at 2,897 to 5,600) was then killed en masse in the gas chambers.

One of the few survivors was Margarethe Kraus, who was subjected to medical experimentation and whose parents were murdered. She was subsequently moved to Ravensbrück.

The Romani Holocaust, murder of the Romani people by the Nazis during World War II, is sometimes known by the Romani language word Porajmos (devouring).
