= Borzęcin, Lesser Poland Voivodeship =

Borzęcin
- Village
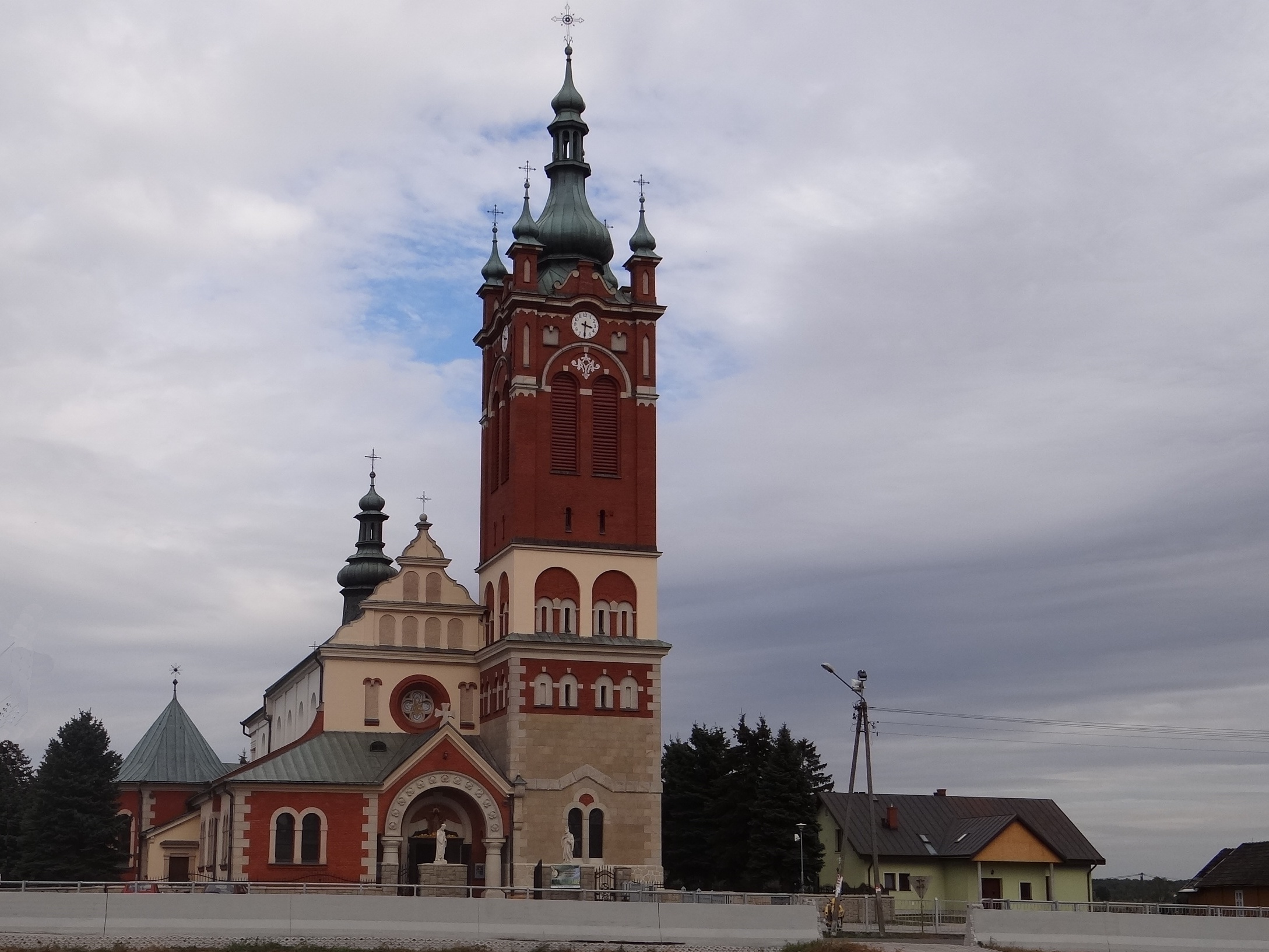
- Church in Upper Borzęcin

- Coat of arms

- Location within Poland
- Coordinates: 50°4′33″N 20°42′20″E
- Country: Poland
- Voivodeship: Lesser Poland
- County: Brzesko
- Gmina: Borzęcin
- Population: 2,900

Borzęcin [bɔˈʐɛnt͡ɕin] is a village in Brzesko County, Lesser Poland Voivodeship, in southern Poland. It is the seat of the gmina (administrative district) called Gmina Borzęcin. It is located on the Uszwica river and divided into two sołectwos, Upper Borzęcin and Lower Borzęcin. Currently it has a population of about 3,700 inhabitants.

== History ==
The village is mentioned in historical documents for the first time in 1475 by the Polish chronicler Jan Długosz in his Liber beneficiorum, a register of church property for tax purposes. Długosz states that the village was founded on unpopulated land in 1364 by the Bishop of Kraków, Bodzanta Jankowski, and named after him as "Bodzantin". This later turned into its current name when Austrian authorities recorded the village as "Borzecin" during the partitions of Poland. The founding of the village was based on Magdeburg law, and all the settlers where Slavs. Each one was given one łan, or about 25 hectares of land. Later settlers arrived from Germany and Silesia. Tax records from 1536 list 87 male peasants, and records attest to the existence of a local church school by 1596. Until 1782 the village was the property of the bishops of Kraków.

Borzęcin was pillaged by Swedish and Transylvanian forces during the period of Polish history known as the "Deluge". After the First partition of Poland in 1772 it became part of the Austrian partition. In the 1830s the village lost one sixth of its population due to a cholera epidemic, a destructive flood and a local famine. The last serfs were manumissioned in 1848.

Polish dramatist and author Sławomir Mrożek was born in Borzęcin in 1930.

During World War II, 143 inhabitants of the village were killed, including 64 in Nazi concentration camps. Of those 43 were Jews. Additionally the Germans murdered 28 Roma from a nearby community in Lower Borzęcin itself, and several hundred more in the nearby village of Szczurowa in the Szczurowa massacre.
