= Jan Albin Goetz-Okocimski =

Polish businessman and politician

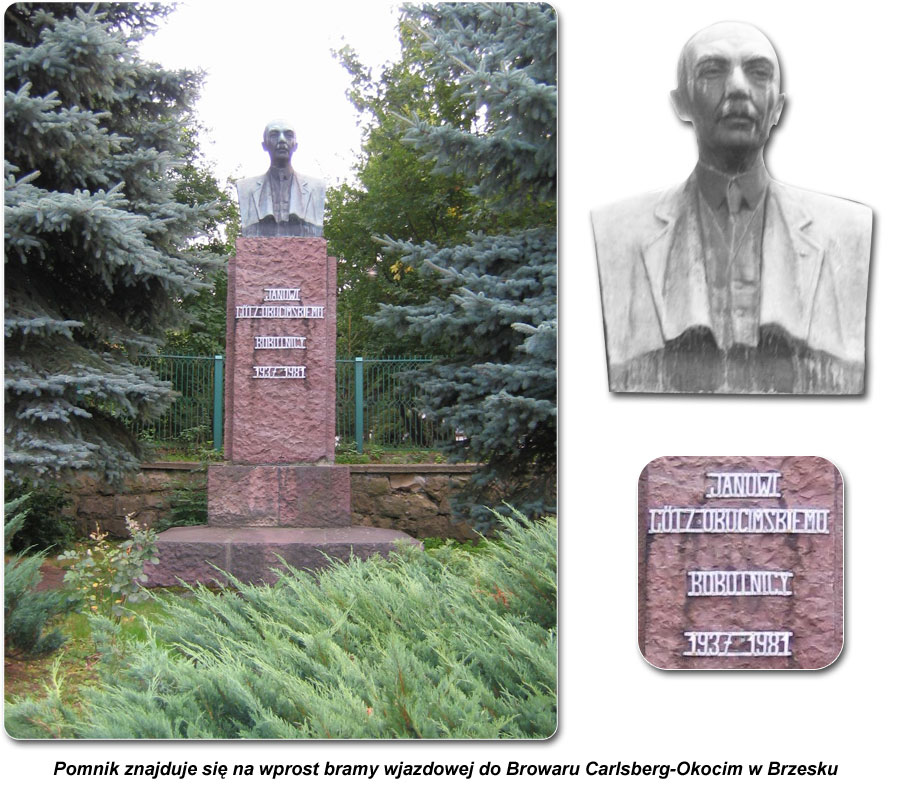
Statue of Jan Albin Goetz in Brzesko, Poland.

Baron, Jan Albin Goetz-Okocimski (né Jan Albin Götz; born 18 July 1864, Okocim, Galicia – died 24 April 1931, Okocim, Poland) was a Polish brewer of German ancestry, head of Okocim Brewery, a philanthropist and patron of the arts, a "Freiherr" (baron) of the Habsburg Empire, a conservative politician, activist and a member of the Austrian parliament and Polish sejm.

Born to Johann Evangelist Götz and Albina Götz in 1864, in 1911 he polonized his name to "Goetz-Okocimski". At the end of the 19th century, together with his wife, baroness Zofia née Sumińska, he built a palace in Brzesko, in Austrian architectural style, surrounded by an English garden. From 1904 until his death he was the sole owner of Okocim brewery. In 1925 for his social activism, as well as business and agricultural contributions to the industry of newly independent Poland he was awarded the Commander's Cross of Order of Polonia Restituta. He was the father of Antoni Jan Goetz.
