= Antoni Jan Goetz =

Polish industrialist and activist

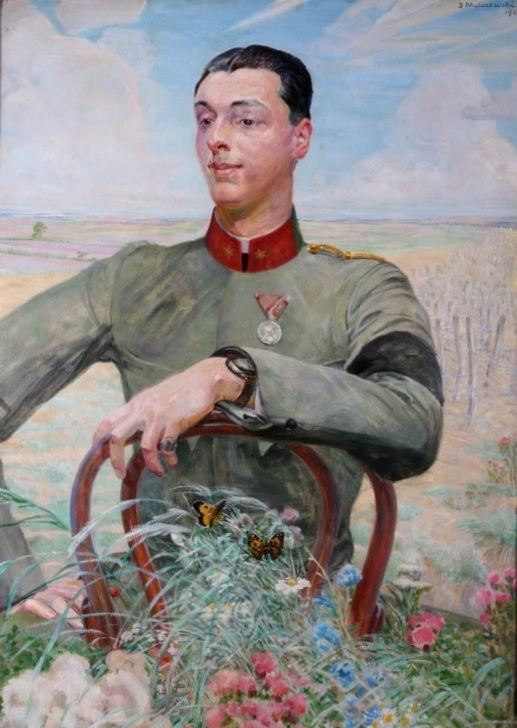
Portrait of Goetz by Jacek Malczewski

Antoni Jan Goetz (also Antoni Jan Goetz-Okocimski; 17 December 1895 – 31 October 1962) was a Polish industrialist, politician and activist. In the 1930s he was the sole owner of the Okocim Brewery in Brzesko, Poland, which had been founded by his grandfather, Johann Evangelist Götz, and a delegate to the Sejm (parliament) of the Second Polish Republic.

== Biography ==
Antoni Jan Goetz was born in Kraków. He was the son of Jan Albin Goetz-Okocimski, a baron of the Hapsburg Empire, which had acquired Galicia in the first partition of Poland, and the grandson of Johann Evangelist Götz. He grew up in a neo-baroque palace built by his father, commissioned from the eminent Austrian architects Hermann Helmer and Ferdinand Fellner, surrounded by an English garden. Viennese architect Leopold Simony added an east wing about 1909 and another Viennese architect, Carl Gustav Swensson, added a greenhouse-orangerie, described as "an important example of European garden architecture of the beginnings of 20th century."

He died in 1962 from a tropical disease in Nairobi, where he had been running a teahouse.

Efforts in 2017 to bring Antoni Goetz-Okocimski's ashes back to Poland from Kenya were successful. On 21 October 2017 a large funeral ceremony, which included events at the Goetz family palace, was held in Okocim, according to his wish to be buried alongside his family. The event was attended by family, politicians, historians, members of the Polish armed forces, executives of Okocim and Carlsberg breweries, and citizens of Brzesko.

An exhibition was also organized about Antoni and his family at the museum in Brzesko. It was entitled "A return from emigration".

== Political activity ==
Goetz was a delegate to the Polish Sejm between 1935 and 1938, when Józef Piłsudski and Polish president Ignacy Mościcki dissolved the Sejm and called for new elections. After the German invasion of Poland on 1 September 1939, Goetz and his family fled Poland on 5 September, the day the Germans arrived in Brzesko, correctly anticipating repression from the Nazis, who also took over Okocim Brewery. He made his way to France where he served as an adjutant at the Polish "Centrum Wyszkolenia Artylerii" (Center for Artillery Studies) in Brittany at Camp Coëtquidan.
