= Bucze, Lesser Poland Voivodeship =

Bucze
- Village
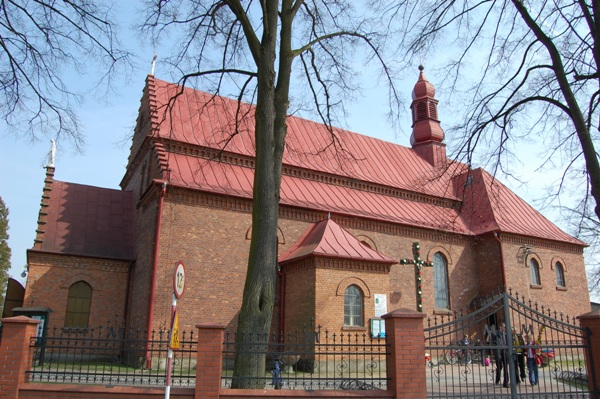
- Church of Our Lady of Perpetual Help

- Location within Poland
- Coordinates: 50°02′02.5″N 20°36′43″E
- Country: Poland
- Voivodeship: Lesser Poland
- County: Brzesko
- Gmina: Brzesko

Government
  - Wójt: Maciej Klimek (Ind.)

Population
  - Total: 1,327
- Website: http://bucze.malopolska.pl

Bucze [ˈbut͡ʂɛ] is a village in the administrative district of Gmina Brzesko, within Brzesko County, Lesser Poland Voivodeship, in southern Poland.

== History ==
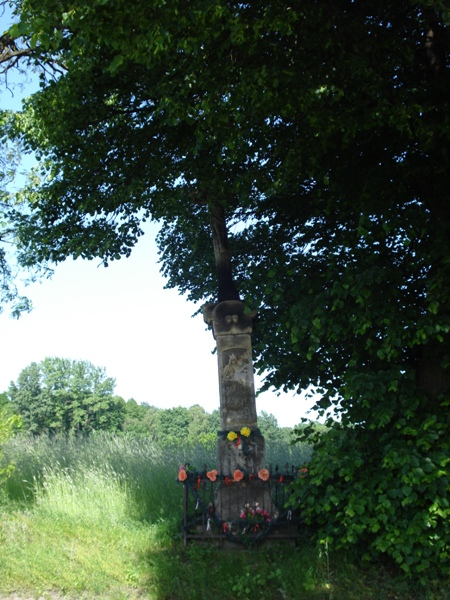
The chapel at the entrance to Bucze

The first mention of Bucze supposedly derived from the twelfth century as a village belonging to the parish in Szczepanów. The first recorded date is 1596 years, as a community of Mokrzyska. In 1932 the village became a separate village communities as a result of administrative reform. The year 1951 is to create an independent parish, which established the then Bishop of Tarnow Jan Stepa. Previously, Bucze was part of the parish of Szczepanów. It happened four years after construction of the magnificent church in Bucze dedicated Our Lady of Perpetual Help. In Bucze can see more than a dozen old wooden houses and farm buildings present the type of rural construction in Kraków from the late nineteenth and early twentieth century. Within the parish there are several roadside shrines and statues dating from the late nineteenth century and recently built. The oldest is the (formerly wooden) chapel standing in a grove on the site of the former pond in front of the cemetery. According to local tradition, was issued about the eighteenth century with the foundation Marcinkowskich, then owners of the village. Inside it is a popular figure of St. John of Nepomuk.

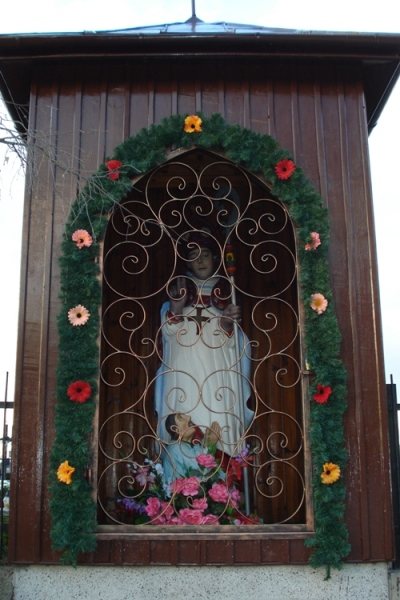
Chapel St. Stanislaus in Bucze

In the cemetery gate is a wooden chapel with an image of St. Stanislaus of Szczepanów. Folk sculptor Stanislaw Zachara in 1884 from the trunk of lime carved figure of St. Stanislaus. In 1900, people just built this chapel, which in later years was several times renewed. In 2008, the chapel has gained a new grid input. Opposite the chapel is the Well of Saint Stanislaus. According to local legend, the well stands in the place where the holy while on his way to Kraków, he felt thirsty. He hit so the ground with his cane, and after a while the water flowed from it. The well for many years was set low on the ground. In 2009, the well raised and fenced.

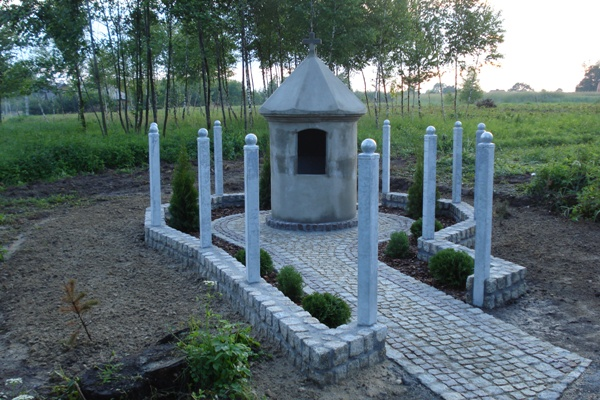
The Well St. Stanislaus

The school building is a brick bungalow that resembles the classic gentry house. It was built in 1929 from the residents of Bucze, which provides financial support for John Albin Goetz (the owner of Brewery Okocimski, but also enlightened social worker). In 1997, the modern wing was added.

In the village center is a modern playground for children. It also stands were elm - a natural monument. Also in the nearby Bratucicki forest, centuries-old oak tree grows Onufry of him hung on the shrine of St. Onufry.

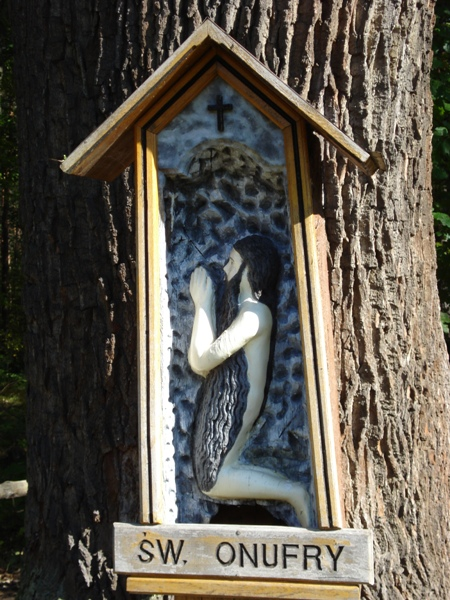
Oak Onufry with the image of St. near Bucze

In Buczu several years motocross events are held "White Mountain". There is also a free hotspot in the project "Brzeskie hotspots". From 2011, a village has names street and neighborhoods. Unfortunately the village has no sewage system.

In 2011 a group of residents formed the Association For Development of Village Bucze (Stowarzyszenie Na Rzecz Rozwoju Wsi Bucze) .

The village has a population of 1,327.

== Education ==
- Public Primary School, ul. Okulicka 6, 32-800 Bucze
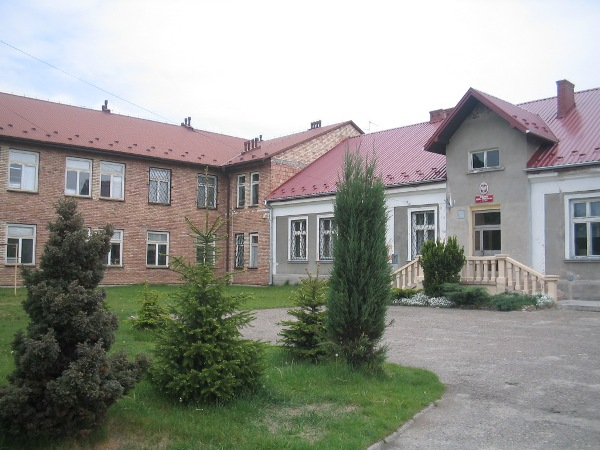
  Public Primary School in Bucze

== Churches ==
Parish Church of Our Lady of Perpetual Help was built in 1946–1947. The designer of this temple is the Adolf Szyszko-Bohusz (1883–1948), one of the greatest Polish architect of the first half of the twentieth century and the chief restorer of the Royal Castle on the Wawel

Brick building, reminiscent in form and design to Gothic Revival architecture, supplemented with elements from the Baroque period. Body nave, chancel closed on three sides, the sides of which are the chapel and the sacristy with a gallery at the second floor up the interior of the building. The high roof unit with crow-stepped gable on the west and "Baroque" turret crowned with a temple-bell. Covered with a coffered ceiling, the interior is decorated with polychrome figural in the form of large, painted on plaster of scenes from the lives of the saints. The north wall of the chancel shows the Assumption of the Blessed Virgin Mary. The paintings made in 1958 by the artist and the Kraków art conservator Paul Mitka. In the temple there are three Neo-Baroque altars constructed in 1955 by Wojciech Adamek and neo-rococo organ. The main altar is the crowned image of Our Lady of Perpetual Help. A small stone stoup adorned with cherubs heads and Gothic tracery is located in the vestibule of the church.

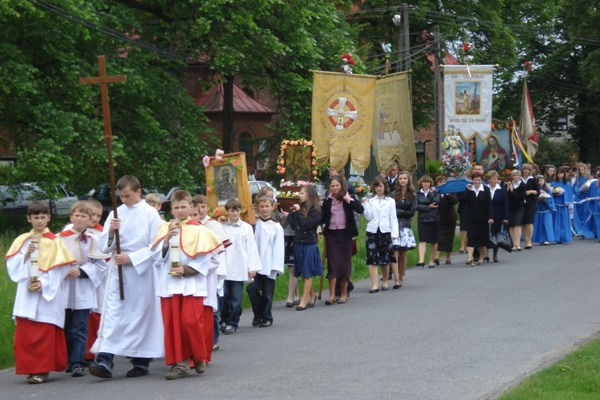
Corpus Christi procession in Bucze, 2008 year

== Culture and Sports ==
In October 2013, the Association For the Development of Village Bucze cast to use built in the center of the square and the obelisk in honor and memory of the victims First and Second World War residents Bucze.

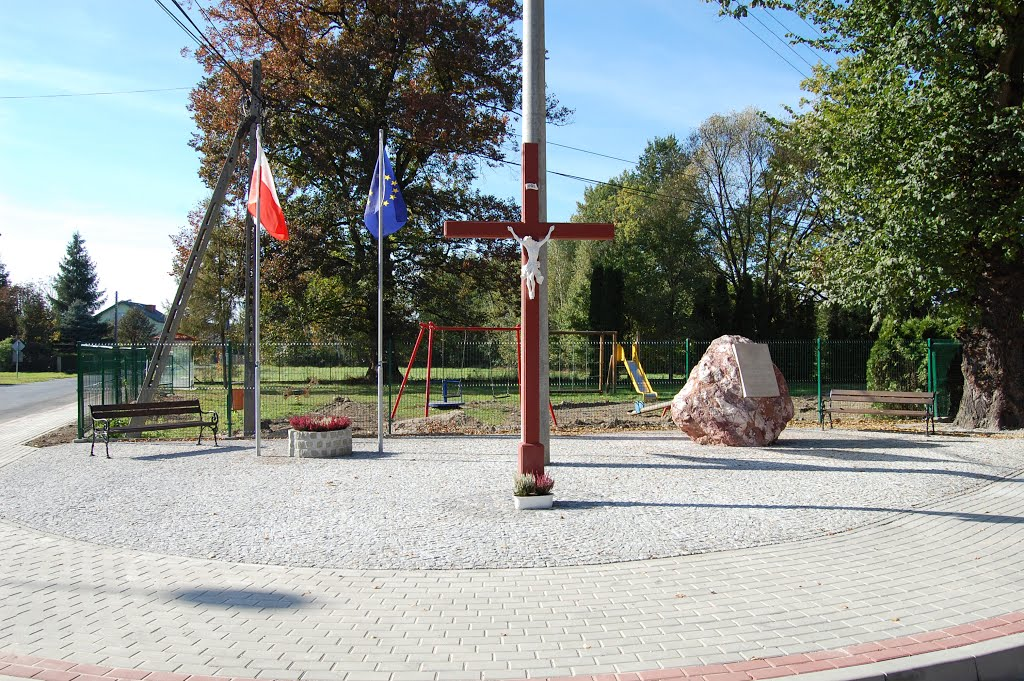
The square and the obelisk in honor and memory of the victims First and Second World War residents Bucze

- The People's Sports Club OLIMPIA Bucze

== Other objects ==
- Fire Station in Bucze
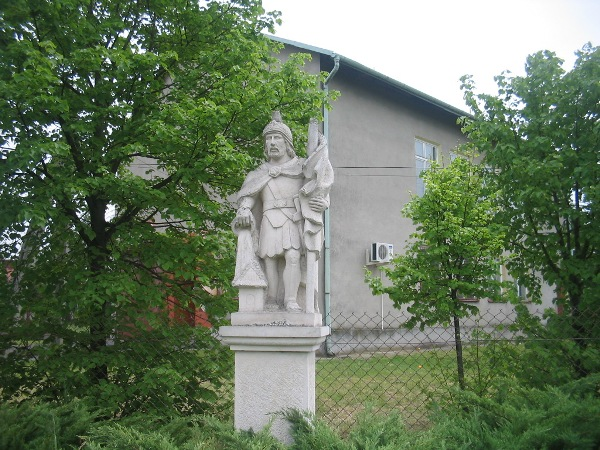
  St. Florian at firehouse OSP Bucze
- Cafeteria

=== Bibliography ===
- Andrew B. Krzypiński, Historical-artistic guide Brzesko and the surrounding area, Brzesko 2003.
