= Johann Evangelist Götz =

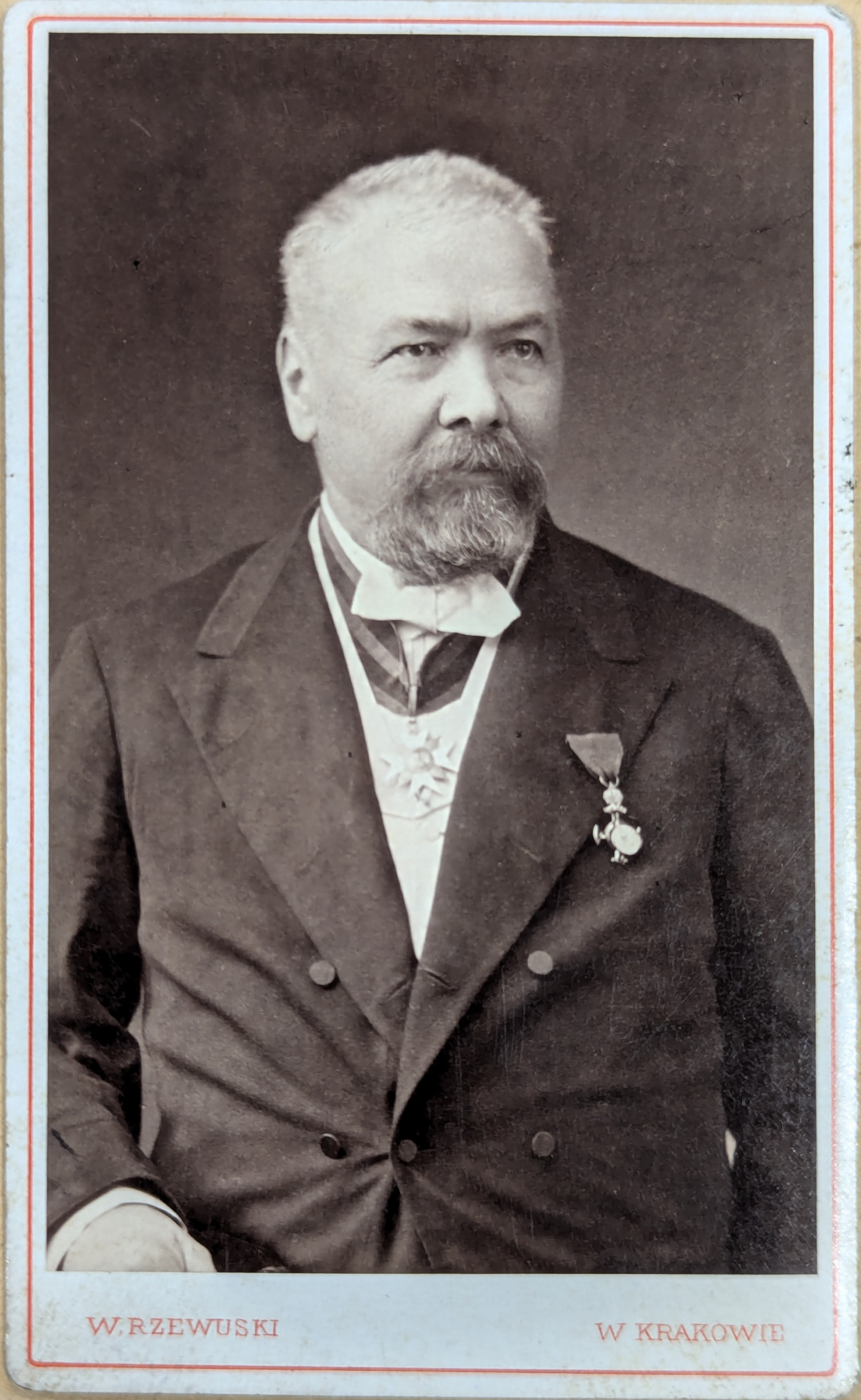
- Born: November 16, 1815; Langenenslingen
- Died: March 14, 1893 (aged 77); Okocim
- Occupation: Brewer
- Known for: Founder of the Okocim Brewery

Johann Evangelist Götz (Polish: Jan Ewangelista Goetz; born 16 November 1815, Langenenslingen, County of Hohenzollern-Sigmaringen – died 14 March 1893, Brzesko, Poland) was a German-Polish brewer, the founder of the Okocim Brewery and father of Jan Albin Goetz (also known as Jan Albin Goetz-Okocimski) and the grandfather of Antoni Jan Goetz (Antoni Jan Goetz-Okocimski). He was one of the first brewers to introduce modern bottom fermentation methods in the Austrian Empire (in Schwechat) and partitioned Poland (in Brzesko).

== Early life ==
Johann Evangelist Götz was born to Anton and Josephine Götz. He attended the village school in his native Langenenslingen and middle school in Wilfigen, which he completed in 1830. He then worked in his father's brewery and on the family's farm. At the age of 18, as a journeyman brewer, he was employed in his cousin's brewery in Hitzhofen. Subsequently, as a member of the brewer's guild, he was obliged to travel away from his home region and establish himself as a brewer elsewhere.

He left Bavaria in 1834 and traveled around Germany and Austria, working in various breweries. He finally settled in Klein-Schwechat, near Vienna, where he obtained a position of "Cellarer" in a brewery of another cousin, Anton. After a year and a half, he was promoted. As an assistant to his cousin over the course of six years, he improved and modernized the brewery so that eventually it became one of the best-run brewing enterprises in Austria-Hungary. It was during that time that Götz introduced the then-new technique of bottom fermentation, which he would later utilize in his Okocim Brewery in Poland.

== Okocim Brewery ==
Early in 1845, Götz responded to an advertisement in the Viennese press of a local merchant, Joseph Neumann, and a Polish landowner, Julian Kodrębski, who were looking for a partner in a brewing enterprise to be set up in Brzesko (then part of the Austrian partition of Poland). Götz arrived in Brzesko in April 1845 and signed an eight-year contract.

== See also ==
- Okocim Brewery
