= Jadowniki, Lesser Poland Voivodeship =

Jadowniki
- Village
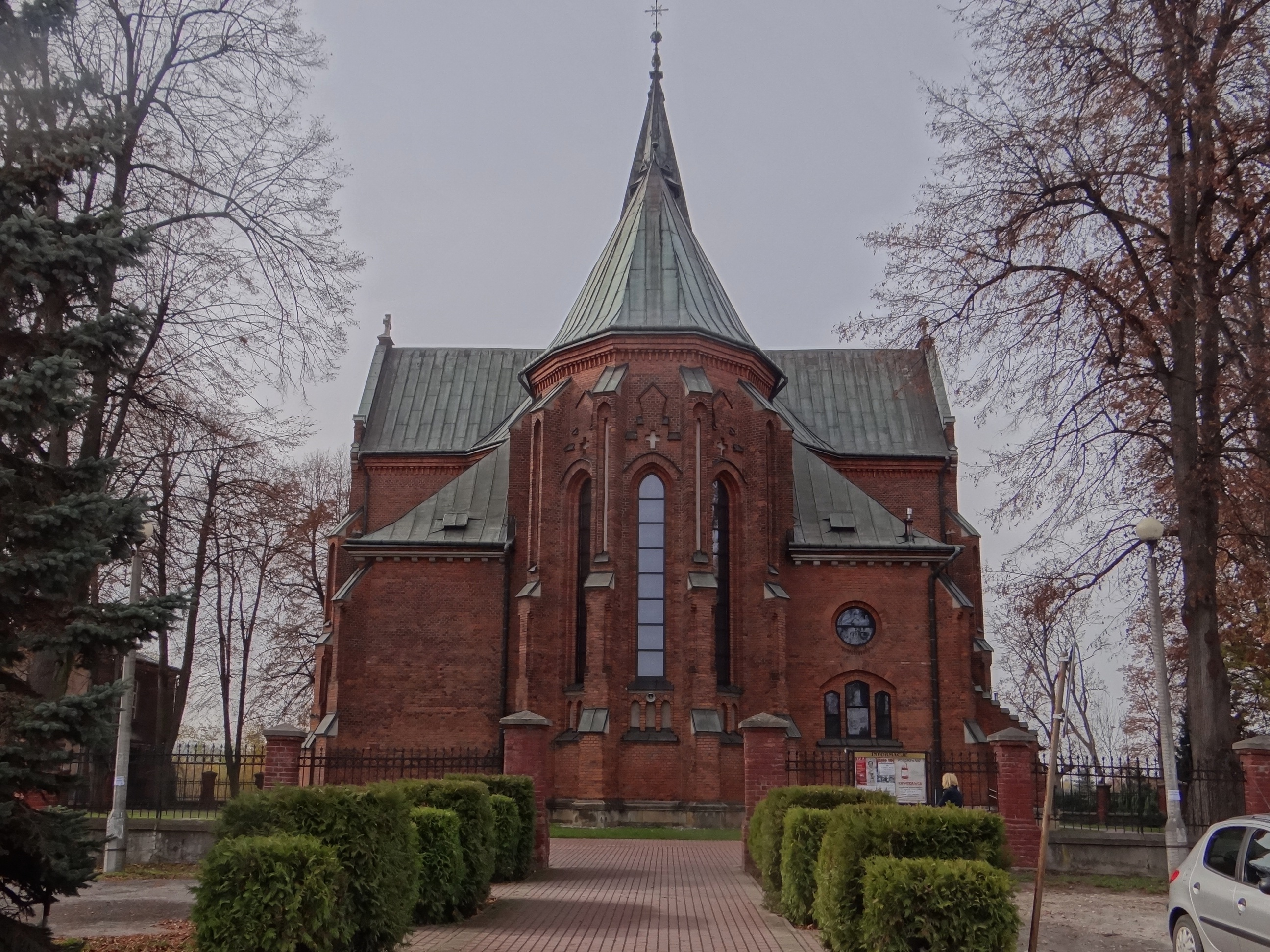
- Parish church

- Location within Poland
- Coordinates: 49°57′49″N 20°38′49″E
- Country: Poland
- Voivodeship: Lesser Poland
- County: Brzesko
- Gmina: Brzesko
- Population: 5,014
- Website: http://www.jadowniki.pl

Jadowniki [jadɔvˈniki] is a village in the administrative district of Gmina Brzesko, within Brzesko County, Lesser Poland Voivodeship, in southern Poland.
