= Gmina Brzesko =

Gmina Brzesko Brzesko Commune
- Gmina
- Flag Coat of arms
- Interactive map of Gmina Brzesko
- Coordinates (Brzesko): 49°58′N 20°37′E
- Country: Poland
- Voivodeship: Lesser Poland
- County: Brzesko
- Seat: Brzesko

Government
  - Mayor: Witold Piróg

Area
  - Total: 102.57 km^{2} (39.60 sq mi)

Population (2006)
  - Total: 35,438
  - Density: 345.50/km^{2} (894.84/sq mi)
  - Urban: 16,827
  - Rural: 18,611
- Website: http://www.brzesko.pl/

Gmina Brzesko is an urban-rural gmina (administrative district) in Brzesko County, Lesser Poland Voivodeship, in southern Poland. Its seat is the town of Brzesko, located approximately 50 kilometres (31 mi) east of the regional capital, Kraków.

The gmina covers an area of 102.57 square kilometres (39.6 sq mi). As of 2006, its total population is 35,438—of which the 16,827 lived in the town of Brzesko is and 18,611 in the rural areas of the gmina.

== Villages ==
Apart from the town of Brzesko, Gmina Brzesko contains the villages and settlements of Bucze, Jadowniki, Jasień, Mokrzyska, Okocim, Poręba Spytkowska, Sterkowiec, Szczepanów and Wokowice.

== Neighbouring gminas ==
Gmina Brzesko is bordered by the gminas of Bochnia, Borzęcin, Dębno, Gnojnik, Nowy Wiśnicz, Rzezawa and Szczurowa.
