= Sabina Jakubowska =

Polish writer and midwife

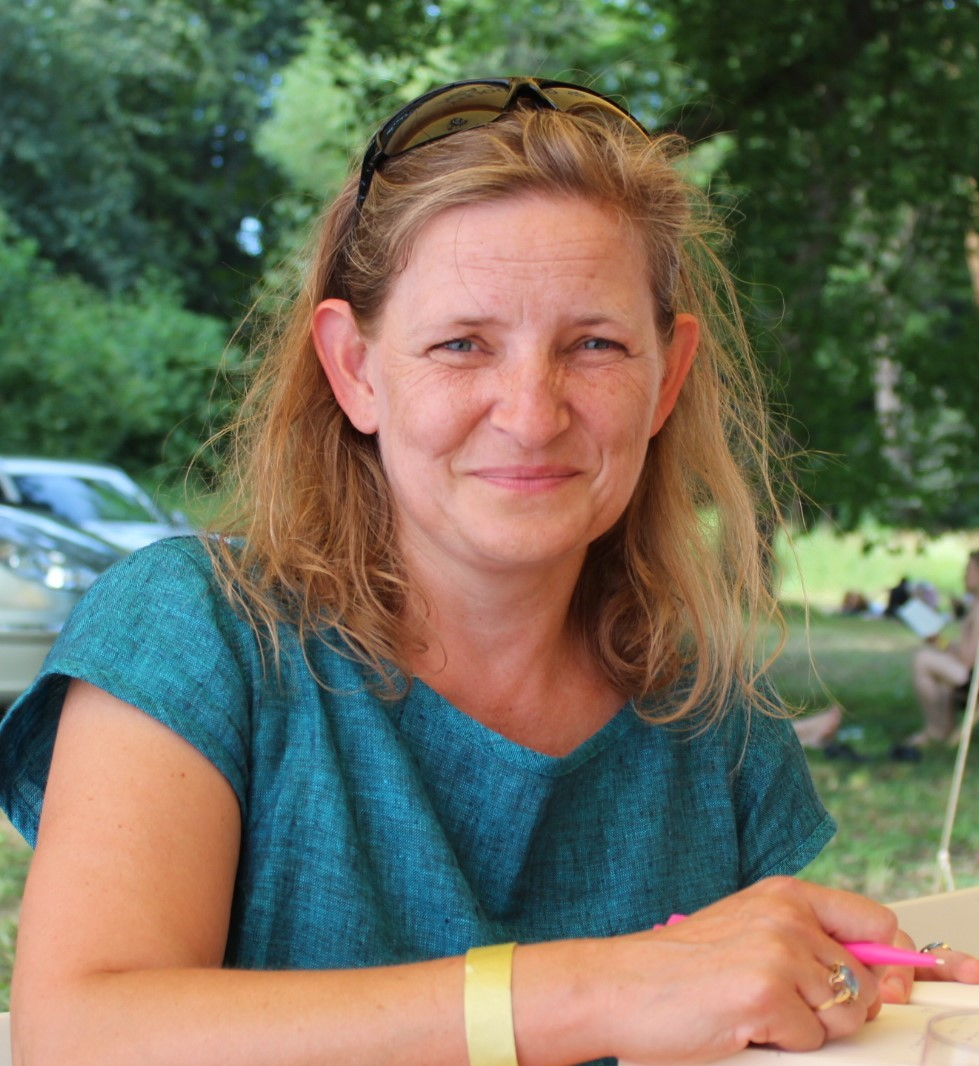
- Jakubowska in 2024
- Born: July 26, 1974 (age 52); Brzesko, Poland
- Education: Jagiellonian University (PhD)
- Occupations: Writer, archaeologist, doula

Sabina Jakubowska (born July 26, 1974) is a Polish writer, archaeologist and doula. She was born in Brzesko, and has a PhD in humanities from Jagiellonian University. Her books have been widely acclaimed, among them the young adult novel Dom na Wschodniej and her debut novel for adults Akuszerki (The Midwives). The latter, which draws on her long family history of midwifery, was nominated for the 2023 EU Prize for Literature.
