= Brzesko Ghetto =

Nazi ghetto in German-occupied Brzesko, Poland

- Location of Brzesko Ghetto within Poland
- Location: German-occupied Poland; 49°58′00″N 20°37′00″E
- Date: fall 1941 (open ghetto)/ mid July 1942 (closed ghetto) to 17 September 1942
- Participants: blue police
- Organizations: Nazi SS
- Camp: Belzec extermination camp, Auschwitz concentration camp
- Victims: 6000
- Survivors: 200
- Witnesses: Dov Landau

Brzesko Ghetto was a Nazi ghetto during World War II in occupied Poland. The ghetto was created by the Third Reich in 1941 in the Polish town of Brzesko located in the Kraków District about 40 miles from Kraków. The ghetto was open when it was first created. In 1942, walls were put up and the ghetto became a closed ghetto. An estimated 4,000 Jewish people lived there but another 2,000 moved there by 1942, many arriving from Kraków and the surrounding area. The Jewish people living within Brzesko were sent to the Bełżec extermination camp and Auschwitz extermination camp. After the exterminations, the camp was closed end of 1942.

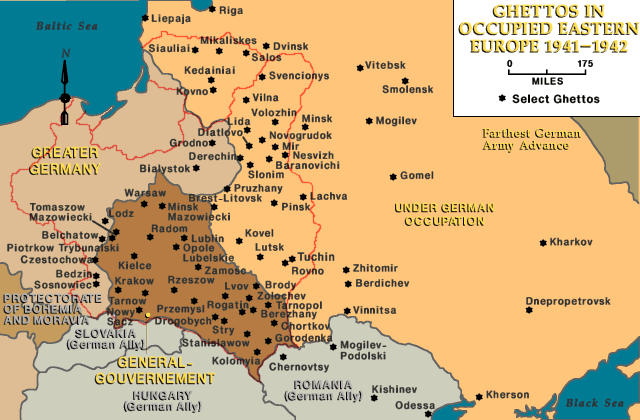
Main ghettos in Poland and Eastern Europe (1941–1942). Brzesko is located between Krakow and Tarnow

== Background ==
Before the town of Brzesko became a ghetto, about half of the population (2,119) was Jewish. When the Wehrmacht arrived on 5 September 1939, they took Jewish hostages and demanded money from the town. The synagogue was burned down the same month. Businesses owned by Jews were forced to put signs up announcing that they were owned by Jews, which discouraged new business. Many Jews were forced to leave their line of work and do work given to them by the Germans forces, mostly cleaning. forced labor was demanded of men between the ages of 15 and 60. Jews were outfitted with armbands displaying the Star of David on their right arm. After the armbands, exclusion from many businesses and activities followed including from restaurants, parks, and stores.

Burglaries were a problem in and around Brzesko before it became a ghetto.

After the occupation of the town, the Germans would come to the town and shoot citizens. These citizens were both random and targeted by the Order Police. Some of the police involved included Wilhelm Rommelmann, Lapsch, and Beck. German gendarmerie from Brzesko also murdered Jews from Brzesko and region and ethnic Poles.

Some Jews from Kraków Ghetto were resettled in Brzesko in March 1941.

== Ghetto history ==
When the ghetto was first created in the fall of 1941 it was an open ghetto. It was marked by signs, but had no barriers to keep the Jewish people inside. Jews were not allowed to leave and any movement in or out of the city was monitored. Having the ghetto open allowed for smuggling of food in by nearby Aryan community. After it was closed, this responsibility fell on the Jewish Police. This section of Jewish Police was led by Diestler, an ex-soldier of the Austrian army. Trades between the Jewish residents and the Jewish Police occurred at night. The Jewish people living in the ghetto were also low on winter apparel and supplies because the German troops seized them to support the invasion of Russia. In June 1942, 180 Jews were shot in the streets and 560 Jews sent to the Belzec extermination camp.

In mid-July 1942, the open ghetto became a closed ghetto surrounded by a fence. It spread across three areas: Berka Joselewicza Street, all the buildings north of the Market Square up to the Rynek Sienny (known today as Sobieskiego Street and Frédéric Chopin Street), and finally Głowackiego Street up to Trzcianka and the Kazimierz Wielki Square. Initially 3,000 Jews lived there. However, 6,000 Jews had to live in this small part of the town by summer 1942. Overpopulation became a problem when the ghetto was fenced off. The camp had about ten people per window which decreased sanitation throughout the camp. This led to an outbreak of typhoid, one of the major causes of death within the ghetto along with starvation. One of the doctors treating those with typhoid fever was Maurycy Gross. Even with the outbreak of typhoid. the main cause of death within the ghetto was Germans. When a Jew was shot by someone in the Nazi party, they would force other Jews within the community to sign a document stating the person had died from natural causes. In addition, the Jews had to pay for any ammunition used to shoot other Jewish people in Brzesko. During 1942, three Aktions took place in the Brzesko ghetto and were conducted by the Order Police which included people such as Lapsch, Wagner, and Mikler. On 18 June 1942, 180 Jews were killed in the streets and 560 deported to the Belzec extermination camp for the third Aktion. In December 1942, fifteen Jews were brought from Zakliczyn and shot at the cemetery.

== Deportation to extermination camps ==
On 17 September 1942 (or on the 12th), the Nazis liquidated the ghetto. About 2,000 Jewish people were sent to the Belzec extermination camp, about 150 miles from Brzesko. Another 4,000 Jewish people were sent to Auschwitz that year. In order to accomplish the deportation, all the Jews living in Brzesko were gathered in the square of the town. Throughout the process of deportation to the death camps, any citizens considered too weak to travel were shot in the town square. This could be due to illness, age, or injury. Those left behind after the deportation were sent to Tarnów Ghetto or killed. Kirkut cemetery was the site of many executions from the Brzesko ghetto.

Throughout the lifespan of the ghetto Jews within the ghetto worked to escape. Some of the Jews escaped into the nearby woods where they hid until they could escape or were caught. Other Jews tried to escape by using fake Aryan documents forged for them. Paulina Tider and her family were part of the group that got Aryan papers to escape Brzesko. Dov Landau managed to escape with his father in June 1942. Anyone who was caught outside the ghetto by the Blue Police guarding the ghetto was turned over to the Gestapo. During the deportation, Dr. Jan Brzeski helped some of the Jews who had escaped by keeping them healthy until they could come out of hiding.

An estimated 200 Jews from Brzesko survived.

== Jewish Council (Judenrat) of Brzesko ==
The Judenrat was formed to meet the demands of the Germans for forced labor. Though the council was made up of Jews who believed they were making a difference, they served German needs. This included taking a census of Brzesko which showed that 3,270 Jews lived in Brzesko on 31 May 1941. The division of the Jewish Council was led by Jakub Hendler who also oversaw the counties of Szczurowa and Borzecin.

Additional groups within Brzesko included the Central Organization for Orphan Care (CENTOS, Centralne Towarzystwo Opieki nad Sierotami), Jewish Social Self-Help (JSS, Jüdische Soziale Selbsthilfe), and Committee for the Aid to Refugees and the Poor.

== Post war ==
The Jewish cemetery still contains the graves of those who died during WWII. In 1947, a monument to remember the mass grave of the 200 Jews who died in Brzesko on 18 June 1942 was built in the Jewish cemetery. A commemorative plaque is also displayed on a wall of the town library which is located on the previous site of the synagogue of Brzesko.
