= Carlsberg Polska =

Danish-owned Polish brewing company

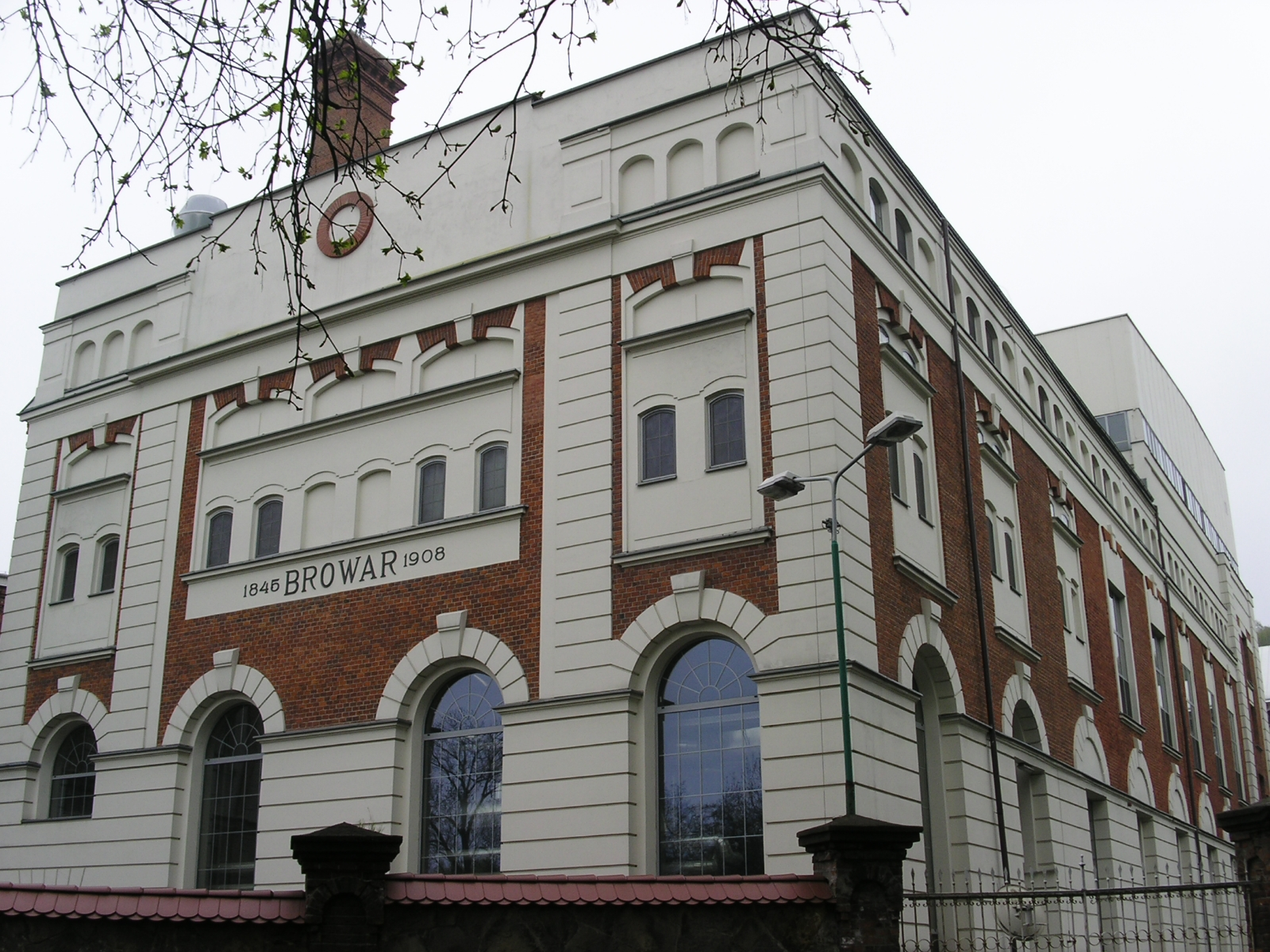
- The main Carlsberg Polska brewery, Okocim
- Location: Poland
- Owned by: Carlsberg Group
- Employees: 1,250

Carlsberg Polska is the Polish subsidiary of the Danish multinational brewing company Carlsberg. Carlsberg has 1/3 control of the Okocim Group, which included the Okocim Brewery, in 2004.

The subsidiary owns four brewing plants and employs 1,250 staff. It is the third largest brewing company in Poland with a 14.4% market share.

== History ==
The Okocim Brewery was founded in 1845. Carlsberg beer was imported into Poland until Carlsberg acquired a stake in the Okocim Brewery in 1997 in exchange for giving Okocim a license to produce Carlsberg.

Carlsberg expanded its presence in Poland in 2001 by becoming a majority shareholder of Okocim and purchasing the Bosman, Kasztelan and Piast breweries; the operation was named the Carlsberg Okocim Group. The Carlsberg brand was re-launched that year and became the fastest growing international brand in Poland, with a sales increase of 671%.

In 2004 Carlsberg purchased the remaining shares of Okocim and renamed the group, Carlsberg Polska. Carlsberg Polska is a 100% owned subsidiary of the Carlsberg Group and is the third largest brewing company in the Polish beer market, which is one of the world's top 10 by volume.

== Brewing plants ==
=== Okocim Brewery ===
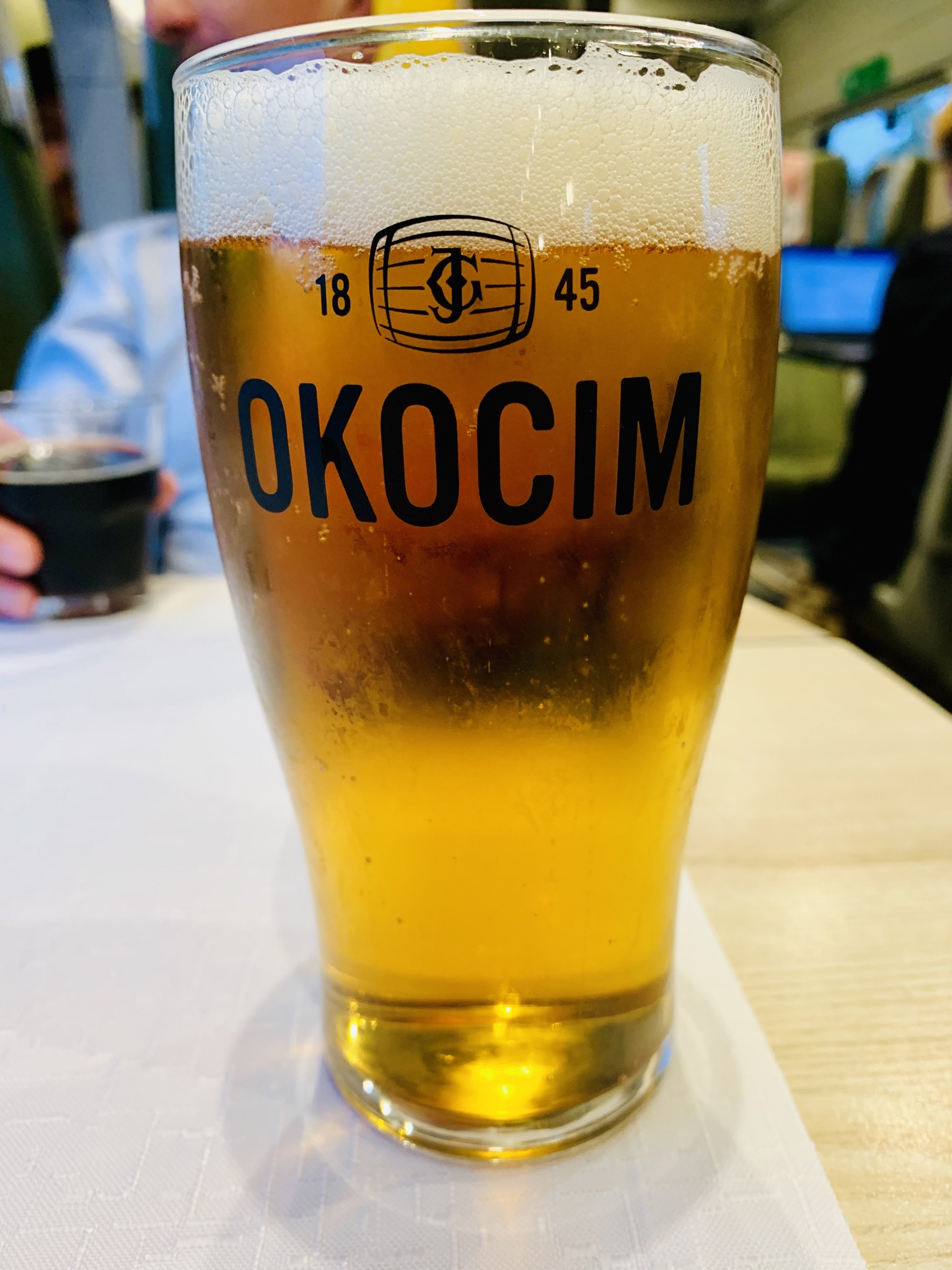
Okocim beer

Okocim Brewery was established in 1845 by Johann Evangelist Götz, who was born in Wirtemberg in 1815. His son Jan Albin expanded the family business, married a Polish aristocrat, and changed his name to Goetz-Okocimski. In 1945 the brewery was nationalised, then reprivatised in the 1990s. Carlsberg first acquired an interest in 1996, eventually acquiring 1/3 control.

Brands produced are mainly pale lagers of varying strengths ranging from 0.5% abv to 7% and include Carlsberg, O.K. Beer, Signature, Mocne, and Karmi. The brewery produces two dark lagers, Palone (5.5%) and Porter (8.3%).

== See also ==
- Polish beer
- Carlsberg
