= Wokowice =

- Village
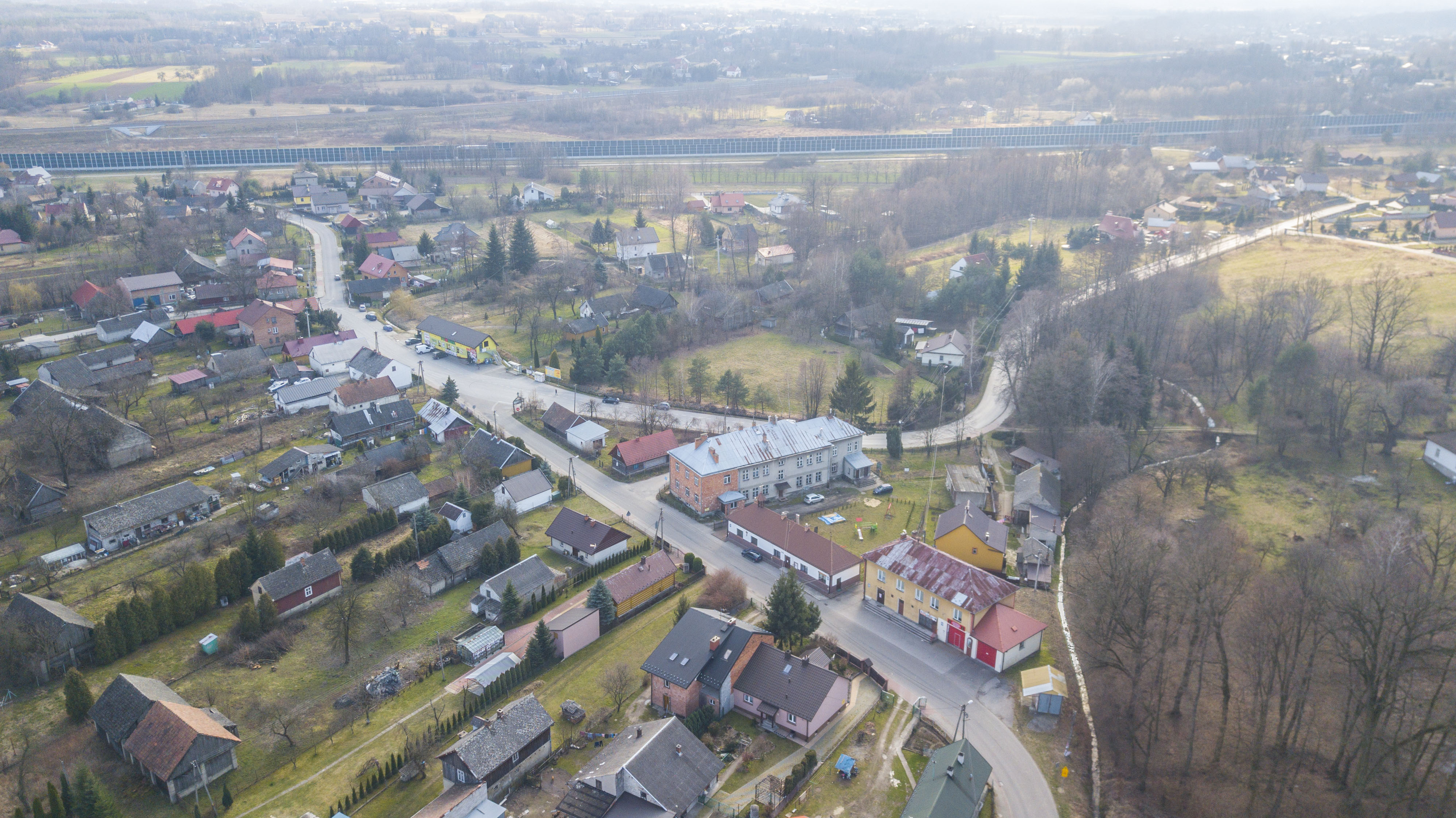
- Aerial view

- Location within Poland
- Coordinates: 50°0′26″N 20°42′1″E
- Country: Poland
- Voivodeship: Lesser Poland
- County: Brzesko
- Gmina: Brzesko

Population
  - Total: 513

Wokowice [vɔkɔˈvit͡sɛ] is a village in the administrative district of Gmina Brzesko, within Brzesko County, Lesser Poland Voivodeship, in southern Poland.
