= Poręba Spytkowska =

- Village
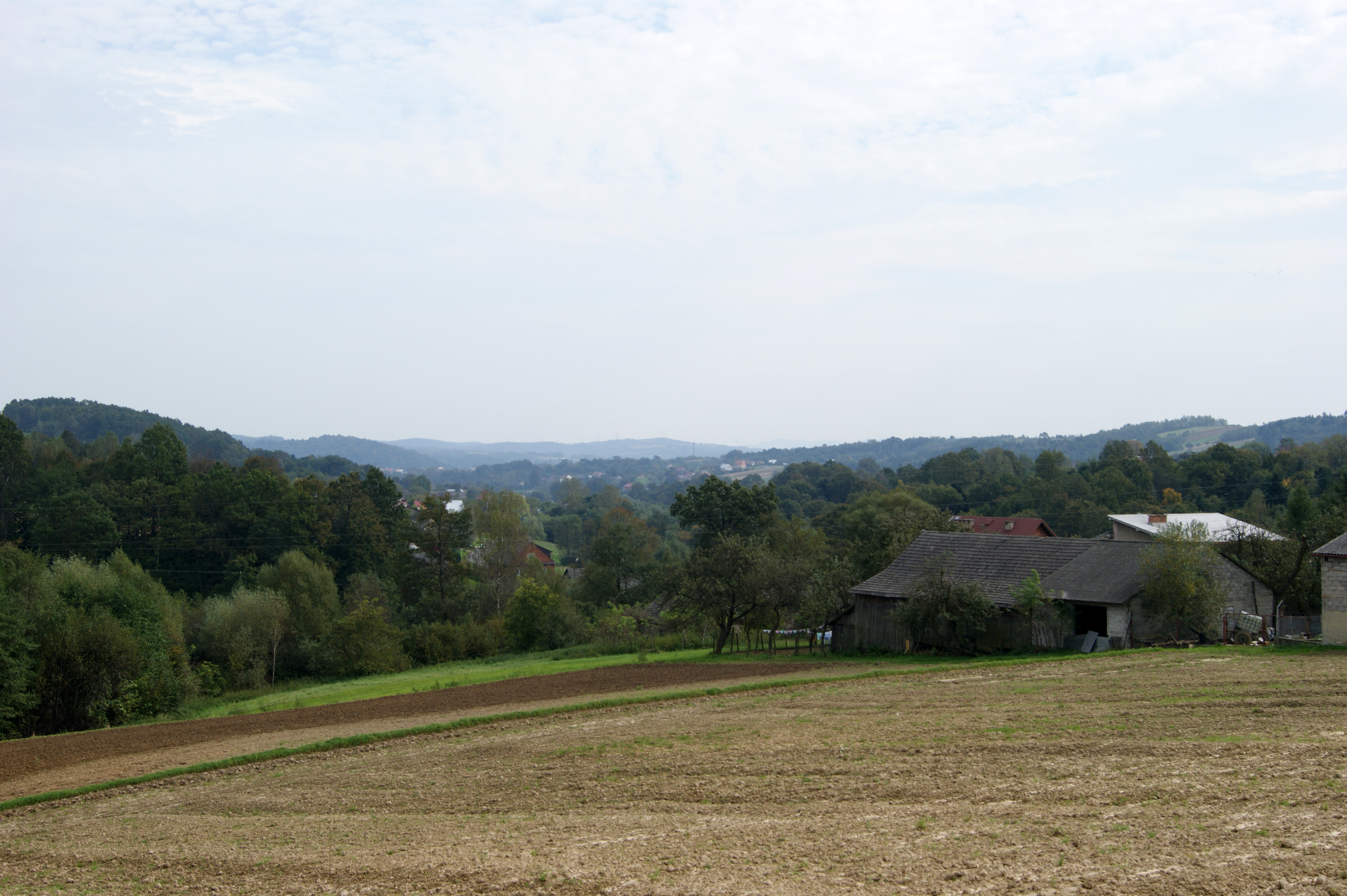

- Location within Poland
- Coordinates: 49°56′31″N 20°32′52″E
- Country: Poland
- Voivodeship: Lesser Poland
- County: Brzesko
- Gmina: Brzesko
- Elevation: 260 m (850 ft)
- Population: 2,500

Poręba Spytkowska [pɔˈrɛmba spɨtˈkɔfska] is a village in the administrative district of Gmina Brzesko, within Brzesko County, Lesser Poland Voivodeship, in southern Poland.
