= Sterkowiec =

- Village
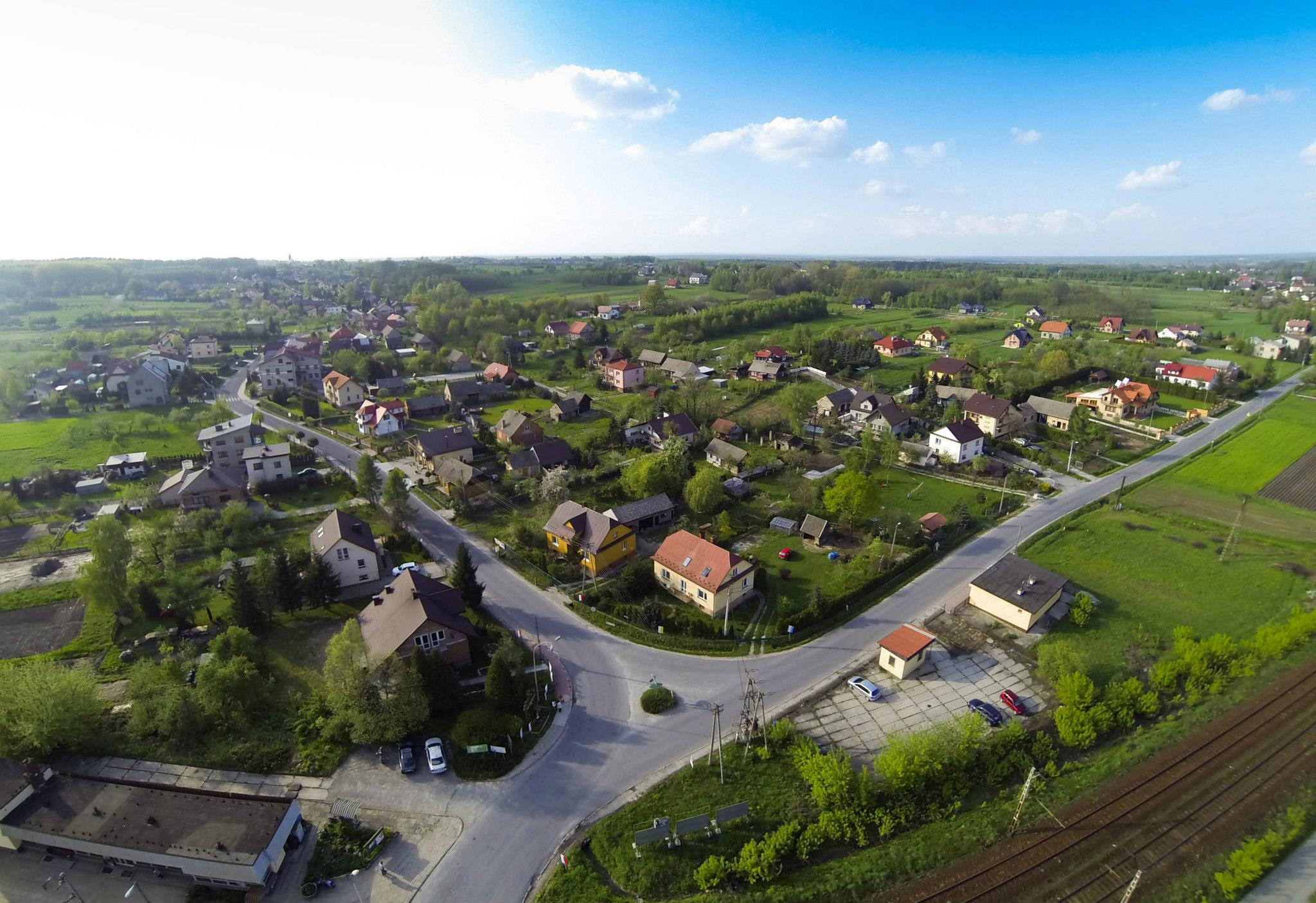

- Location within Poland
- Coordinates: 49°59′42″N 20°40′46″E
- Country: Poland
- Voivodeship: Lesser Poland
- County: Brzesko
- Gmina: Brzesko
- Population: 840
- Website: http://www.sterkowiec.pl

Sterkowiec [stɛrˈkɔvjɛt͡s] is a village in the administrative district of Gmina Brzesko, within Brzesko County, Lesser Poland Voivodeship, in southern Poland.
