= Mokrzyska =

- Village
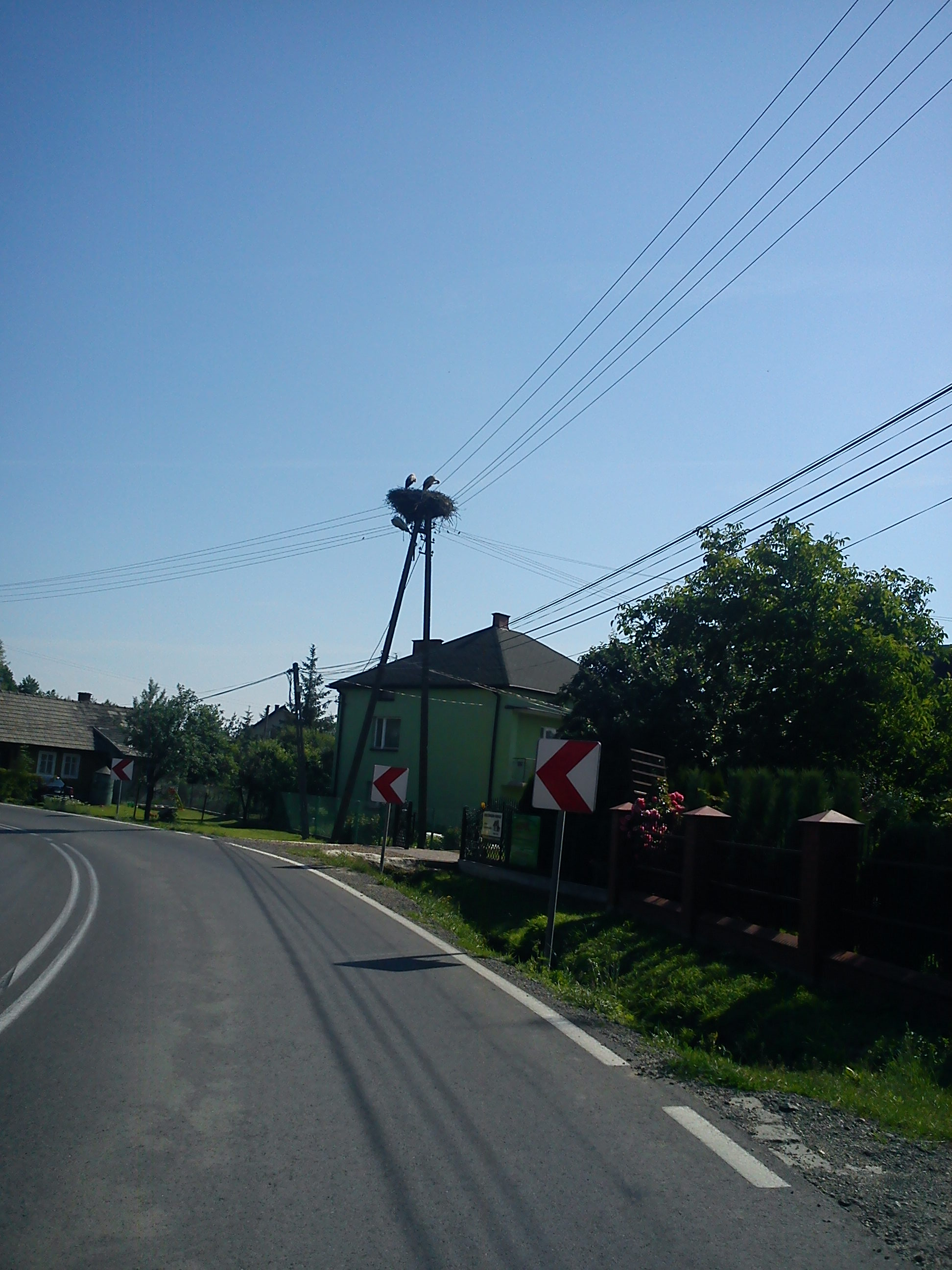

- Location within Poland
- Coordinates: 50°0′20″N 20°37′17″E
- Country: Poland
- Voivodeship: Lesser Poland
- County: Brzesko
- Gmina: Brzesko

Government
  - Mayor: Maciej Porwisz (PB)
- Population: 2,700
- Website: http://mokrzyska.pl/

Mokrzyska [mɔˈkʂɨska] is a village in the administrative district of Gmina Brzesko, within Brzesko County, Lesser Poland Voivodeship, in southern Poland.
