= Okocim Brewery =

Polish brewery

Coordinates: 49.9595°N 20.6028°E

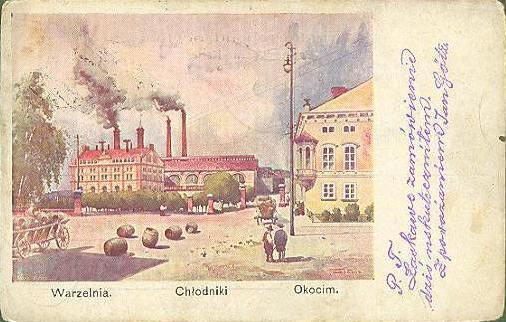
Okocim brewery on a postcard from 1900. The caption lists, from left to right "Brewery. Cooling. Okocim".

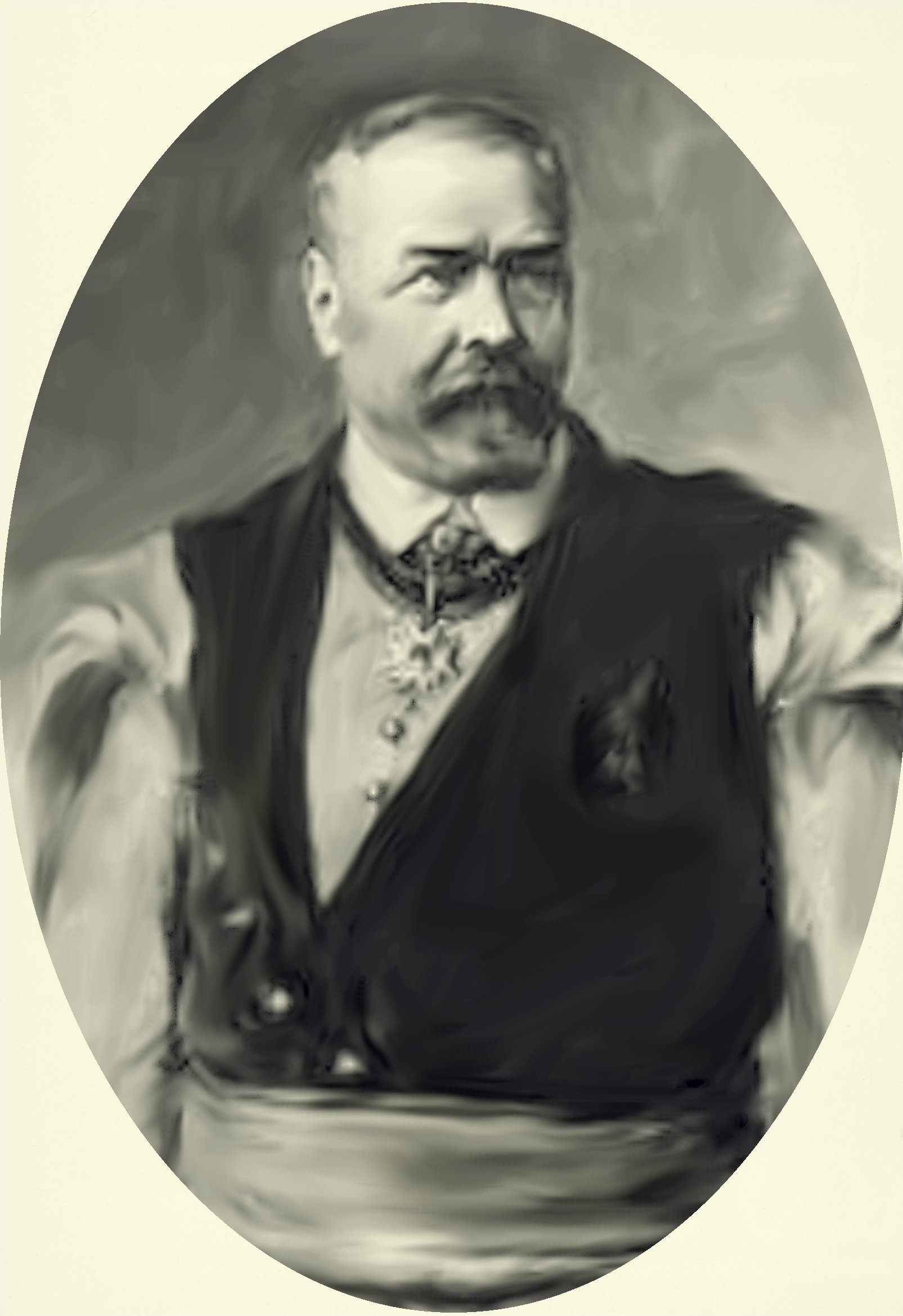
Johann Evangelist Götz, the founder of the brewery.

Okocim Brewery /əˈkɒtʃɪm/ (Polish pronunciation: [ɔˈkɔt͡ɕim]), in Brzesko in southeastern Poland, is a brewery founded in 1845.

== History ==
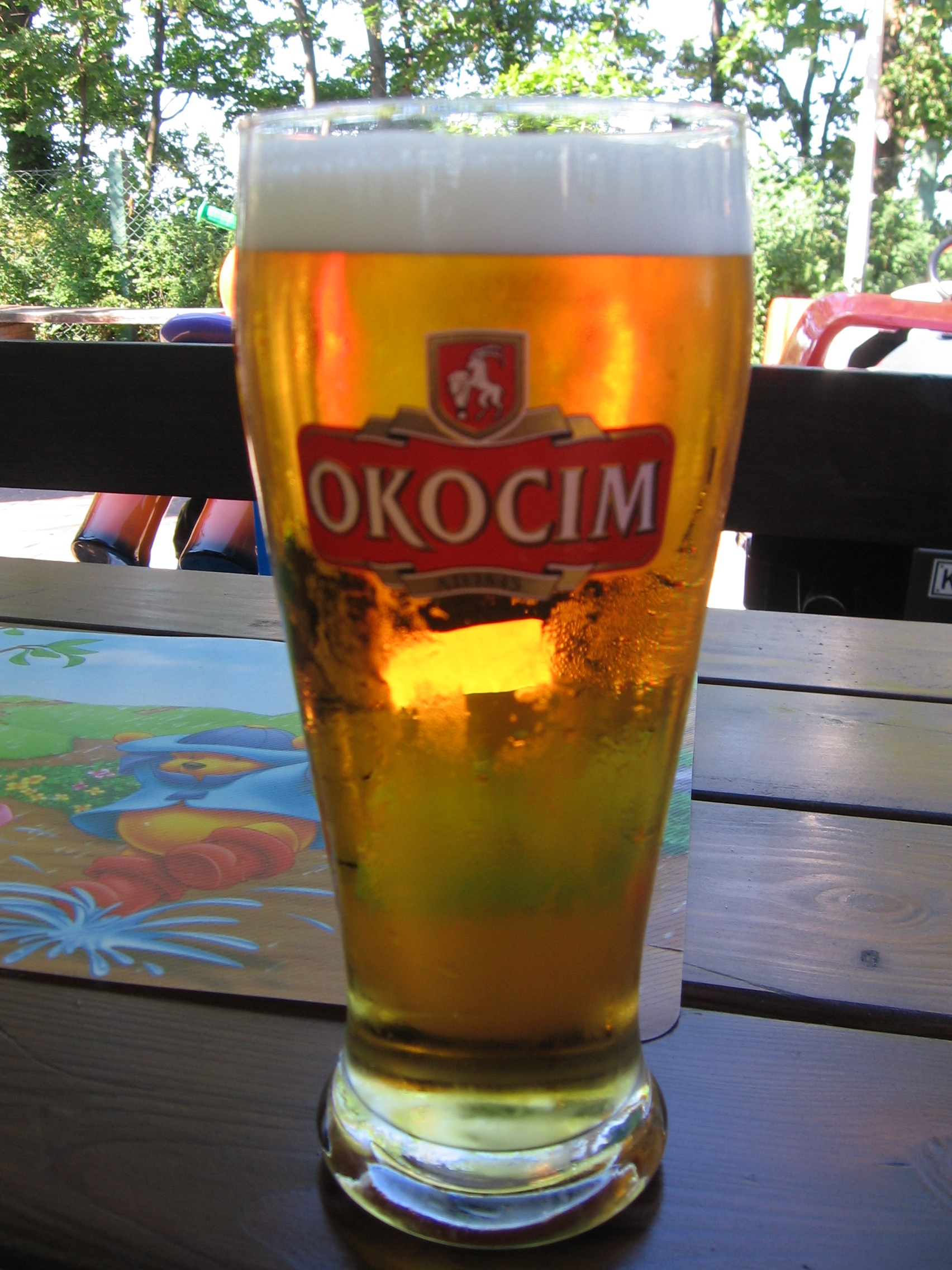
Okocim beer.

The brewery was established in 1845 by Johann Evangelist Götz (1815-1893), a German beer maker born in Wirtemberg, Joseph Neumann from Austria-Hungary, and local Polish noble Julian Kodrębski. The first batch of beer was brewed on February 23, 1846. During the "Rabacja", a Polish-inspired peasant uprising in Galicia in 1846, directed at Polish nobility and affluent merchants complicate to Austrian partitioners of Poland, Götz barely escaped with his life. He survived thanks to help from local friends and the fact that the workers of his brewery stood up in his defense, certifying that his business provided good pay and decent working conditions. In turn, Götz helped to save the life of Julian Kodrębski, who had partly funded his brewery, by hiding him in woods on the banks of the Uszwica river in Brzesko, and providing him with food which was delivered over the course of ten days by workers from the brewery.

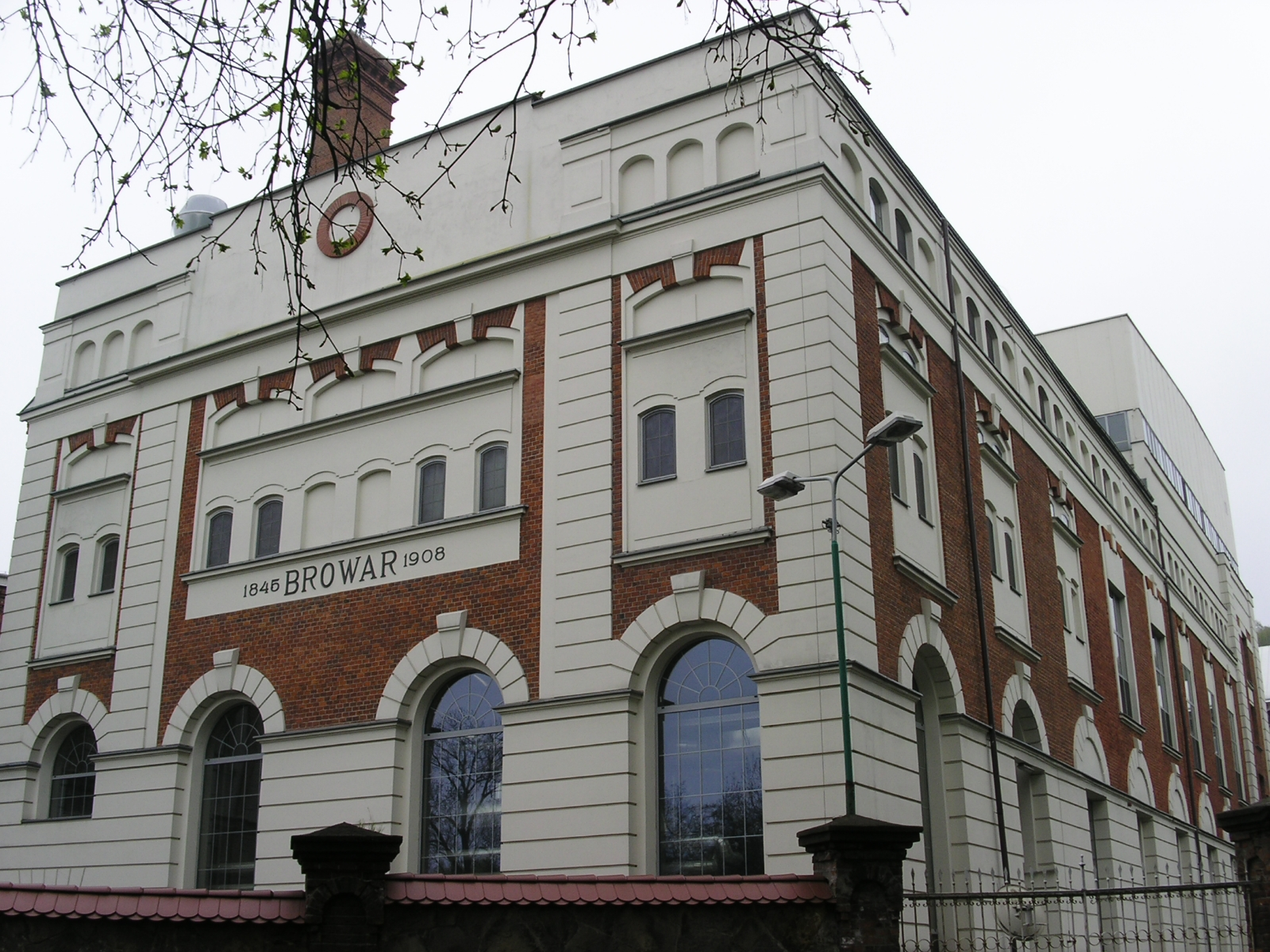
The brewery building

After the death of Neumann, Götz became the sole owner of the brewery. He modernized the enterprise and expanded it, adding a malthouse in 1875. In 1884 the brewery was visited by J. C. Jacobsen, the founder of Carlsberg brewery in Denmark.

After the death of Johann Evangelist Götz in 1893, his son, Jan Albin Goetz, took over. Jan Albin further expanded the family business, married a Polish aristocrat, and changed his name to Goetz-Okocimski. The Götz family quickly assimilated into Polish culture, became Polish patriots and engaged in Polish politics. Among other endeavors they funded a statue of Adam Mickiewicz, a gallery and the Juliusz Słowacki Theatre in Kraków, and contributed money to buy the Wawel Castle from the Austrian authorities. Jan Albin was also the president of the Koło Polskie ("Polish Circle") in the Austrian parliament, and after Poland regained its independence a senator to the Polish Sejm. He built a private rail link between the brewery and the Brzesko rail station. As the richest person in Lesser Poland at the time, he was also a philanthropist and a patron of the arts; his portrait was painted by Stanisław Wyspiański and Jacek Malczewski.

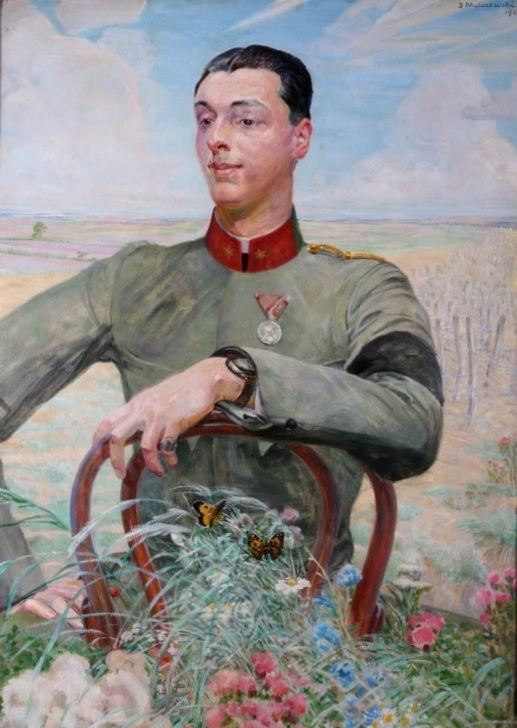
Portrait of Antoni Jan Goetz-Okocimiski by Jacek Malczewski.

At the turn of the 20th century, the Okocim brewery was the largest brewery in the former Polish–Lithuanian Commonwealth (which had been partitioned by Russia, Austria and Prussia at the end of the 18th century), and the sixth largest of roughly 1600 breweries in all territories of the Habsburg Empire. By 1911 it was the fifth largest, with annual production reaching 380 thousand hectolitres.

In the 1930s, in newly independent Poland, the brewery was run by Jan Albin's son, Antoni Jan Goetz, who took over in 1931. However, after the German invasion of Poland, the family fled Poland and made its way to France, and the brewery was taken over by the Nazis. Antoni Jan Goetz died in Nairobi in 1962.

At the end of the war, in 1945 the brewery was nationalised by the communist authorities of the People's Republic of Poland and reorganized as the "Okocimskie Zakłady Piwowarskie" (Okocim Beer Factories). During the communist period, along with the Żywiec Brewery. Okocim was one of only two beer makers allowed to sell its products outside its region and abroad.

After the fall of communism in 1990, it was transformed into a government-run business enterprise and subsequently auctioned off, reprivatised and listed on the Warsaw Stock Exchange. Since 1996 the brewery has been a part of Carlsberg Polska, Carlsberg Breweries A/S.

The palace of the Goetz-Okocimiski family, which was also taken over by the Nazis and then nationalized by the communists, was also reprivatized and sold to the descendants of the family in 2007. In 2008 the palace was resold to a private couple who plan to transform it into a five star hotel and modern spa, which would include the opportunity to bathe in the beer produced by the brewery.

Today, there are at least three brewhouses in use. The brewery is well preserved and a classic site in the modern history of beer-making, though recent additions have expanded it and seen the introduction of a few modern pieces of equipment.

== See also ==
- Dębowe Mocne
- Polish beer
- Carlsberg Polska
