= Brzesko =

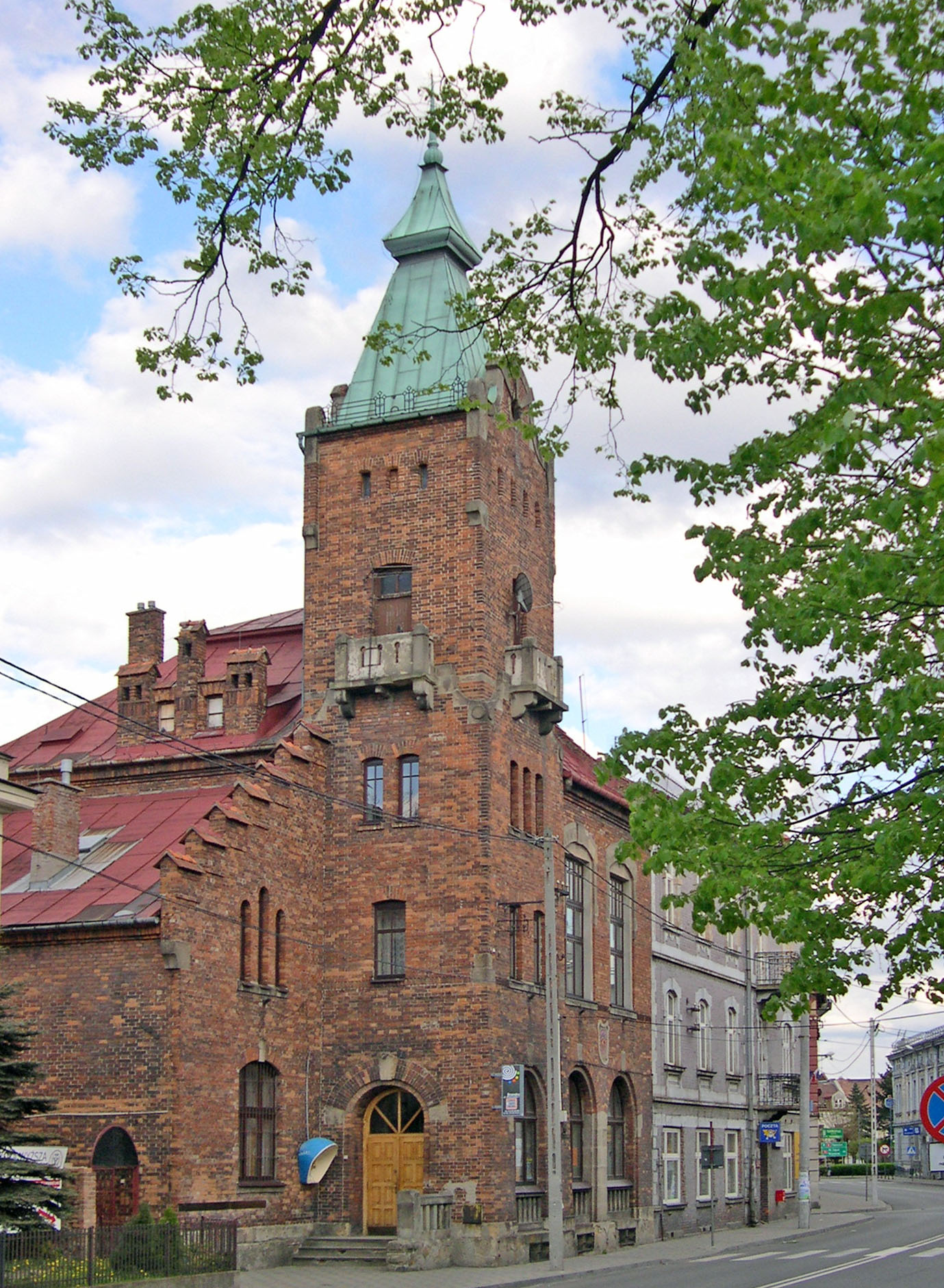
- Town Hall

- Flag Coat of arms

- Location within Poland
- Coordinates: 49°58′04″N 20°36′25″E
- Country: Poland
- Voivodeship: Lesser Poland
- County: Brzesko
- Gmina: Brzesko

Government
  - Burmistrz: Tomasz Latocha (PB)

Area
  - Total: 11.73 km^{2} (4.53 sq mi)

Population (31 December 2021)
  - Total: 16,665
  - Density: 1,421/km^{2} (3,680/sq mi)
- Time zone: UTC+1 (CET)
  - Summer (DST): UTC+2 (CEST)
- Postal code: 32-800
- Car plates: KBR
- Website: http://www.brzesko.pl

Brzesko ([ˈbʐɛskɔ]; Yiddish: בריגעל, Brigel) is a town in southern Poland, in Lesser Poland Voivodeship. Since Polish administrative reorganization (in 1999), Brzesko has been the administrative capital of Brzesko County in Lesser Poland Voivodeship. Before reorganization it was part of Tarnów Voivodeship (1975–1998).

As of December 2021, the town has a population of 16,665. Historically, the town was subject of various ownerships since its 1385 founding. Okocim Brewery, founded by Jan Goetz in 1845, is located in nearby Okocim.

Brzesko lies on the Uszwica river, along the important rail route from Kraków to Przemyśl, and along the European route E40. The town has a 14th-century church of St. Jacob, and the 19th-century palace of the Goetz family (founders of the Okocim Brewery). Other historic buildings were either destroyed in numerous wars, or burned in fires, such as the great fire of 1904. The name Brzesko probably comes from the word brzeg (shore), as the town is located on the shore of a river.

== History ==
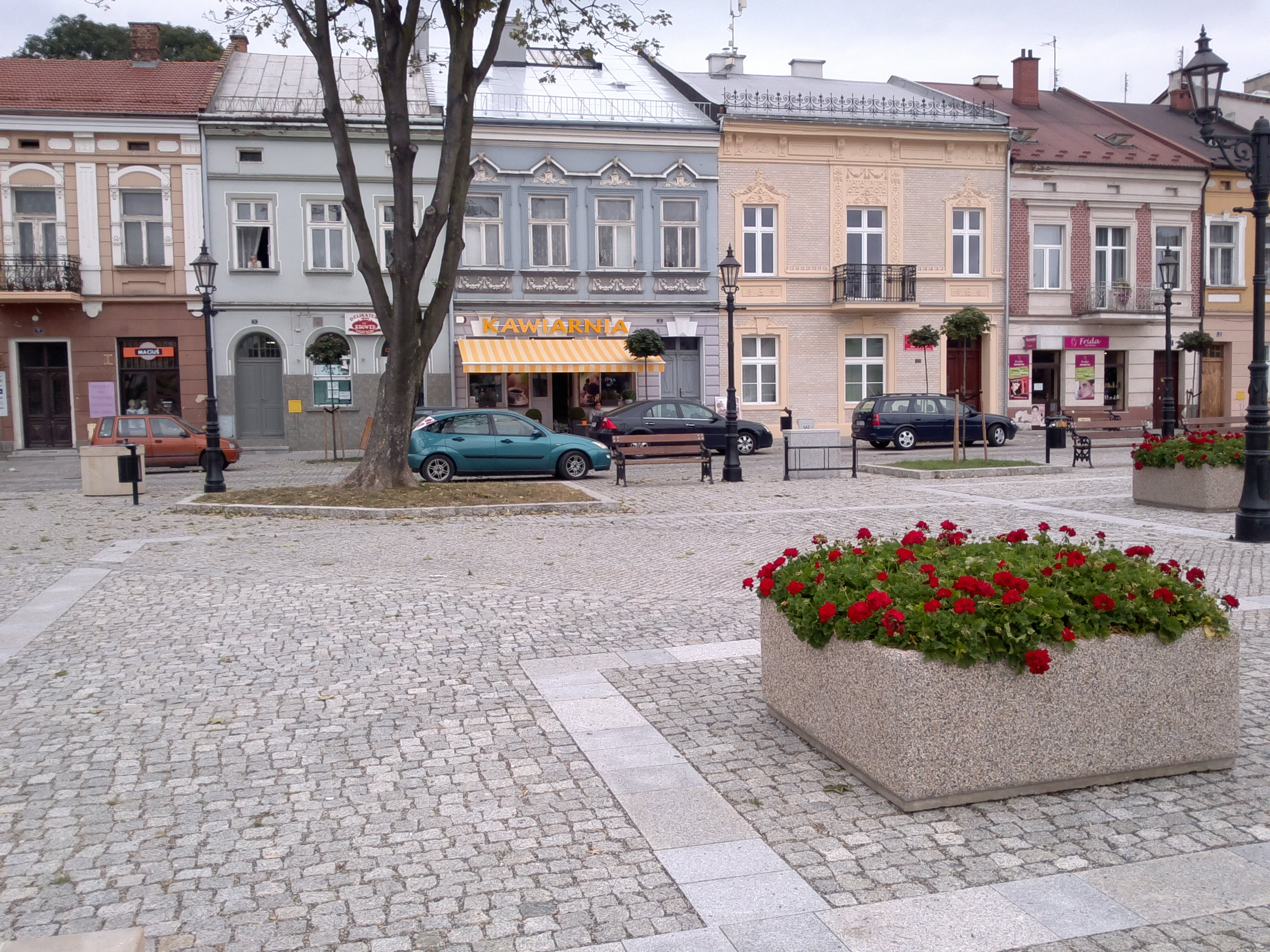
Rynek (Market Square)

The town was founded in 1385 by Spytko II of Melsztyn, the castellan of Biecz, with permission of Queen Jadwiga of Poland. Brzesko still retains the medieval shape of its town center, with a market square and the Gothic church of St. Jacob (1447).

In 1440, the town built a hospital for the poor, funded by Gregory of Sanok. Brzesko was administratively located in the Kraków Voivodeship in the Lesser Poland Province of the Polish Crown until 1772, when it was annexed by Austria in the First Partition of Poland. Then it became part of Galicia (Austrian Partition of Poland), to which it belonged until Poland regained independence in 1918. Before that, in 1856, Brzesko got a railway station, along a line from Kraków to Lwów.

During the German invasion of Poland, which started World War II, the Wehrmacht arrived in Brzesko on 5 September 1939. Soon afterwards, the Einsatzgruppe I entered the town to commit various atrocities against the populace. Under German occupation, the town became part of the kreis (county) Tarnów in the Kraków District of the General Government, a separate administrative region of the Third Reich. 44 people were killed and about 200 were injured as they were waiting for the evacuation trains from Silesia. Several Poles from Brzesko were murdered by the Russians in the large Katyn massacre carried out in April–May 1940. A closed Jewish ghetto existed between spring 1941 and September 1942. It spread across 3 areas: Berka Joselewicza Street, then all the buildings north of the Market Square up to the Rynek Sienny (known today as Sobieskiego Street and Chopina Street), and finally Głowackiego Street up to Trzcianka and the Kazimierza Wielkiego Square. Several Poles were imprisoned by the Germans in the local prison and then deported to concentration camps for rescuing Jews. The Red Army arrived in Brzesko on 19 January 1945, and then the town was restored to Poland.

=== Historical cemeteries ===
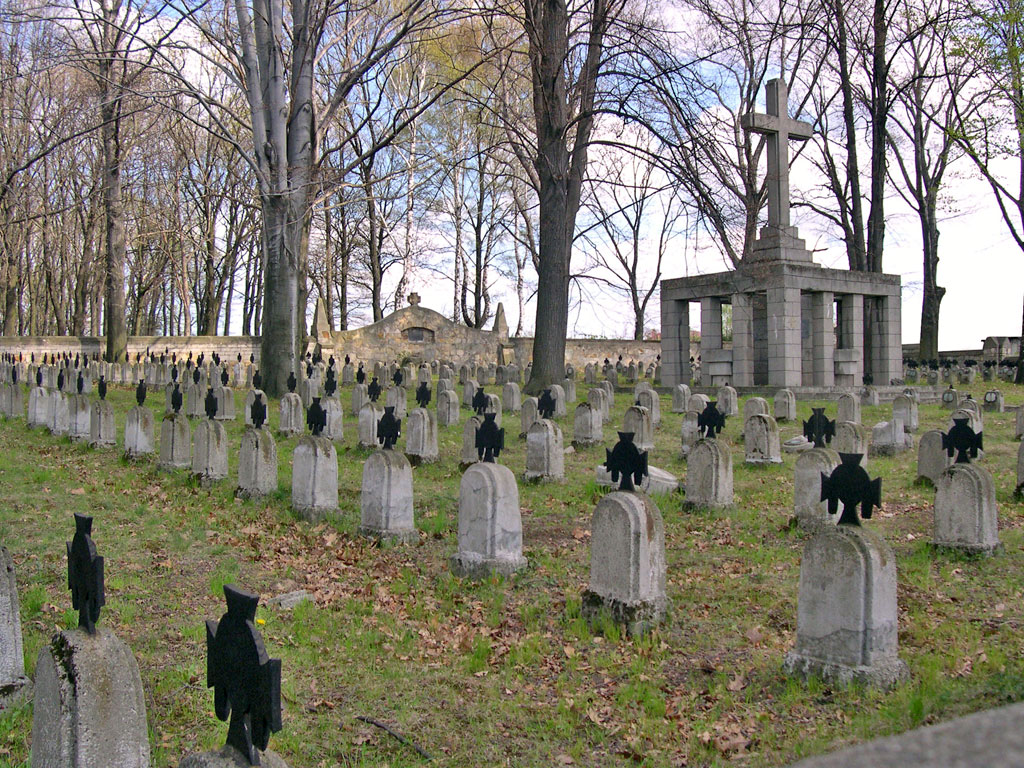
Military cemetery no. 276 in Brzesko, with graves of fallen soldiers of World War I.

The town has several cemeteries of historical significance. There are three military cemeteries dating from World War I and a kirkut dating back to at least 1847.

The three military cemeteries were all commissioned by the Austro-Hungarian Ministry of War between 1914-1915 and designed by the architect Robert Motka. Cemetery no. 277, in Brzesko-Okocim, is the smallest of the three, with 9 Austro-Hungarian soldiers buried there. No. 276 is the largest, with graves of 441 Austro-Hungarian, 9 German, and 63 Russian soldiers. It borders the kirkut known as "New Jewish Cemetery" (Nowy cmentarz żydowski), which also contains within its historical area military cemetery no. 275, where 21 Jewish Austro-Hungarian soldiers are buried.

The "New Jewish Cemetery" was originally thought to have been built and replaced the "Old Jewish Cemetery" in 1846, when the latter became full. However, more recent research carried out by the Museum of Bochnia found gravestones dating back to 1823 or 1824. It presently contains about a thousand tombstones, with the last burial having taken place in 1950. It is the burial place of at least two Tzadiks ("righteous" in Hasidic tradition) and has been a destination of pilgrimages in the past. During World War II the German occupation authorities used the kirkut as an execution site. Around 200 Jews were killed by the Nazis at the cemetery on 18 April 1942 and additional persons from the area who had been murdered were buried there as well. During and after the war the condition of the cemetery deteriorated but renovation efforts were begun in 1960s. These, thanks to the funding from abroad, as well as the work of the Brzesko city council and the Museum of Bochnia, have continued into the twenty-first century.

== Sports ==
Brzesko is home to Okocimski Klub Sportowy Brzesko (Okocim Brzesko Sports Club), which from its beginnings in 1933 has been associated with the Okocim Brewery.

== Points of interest ==
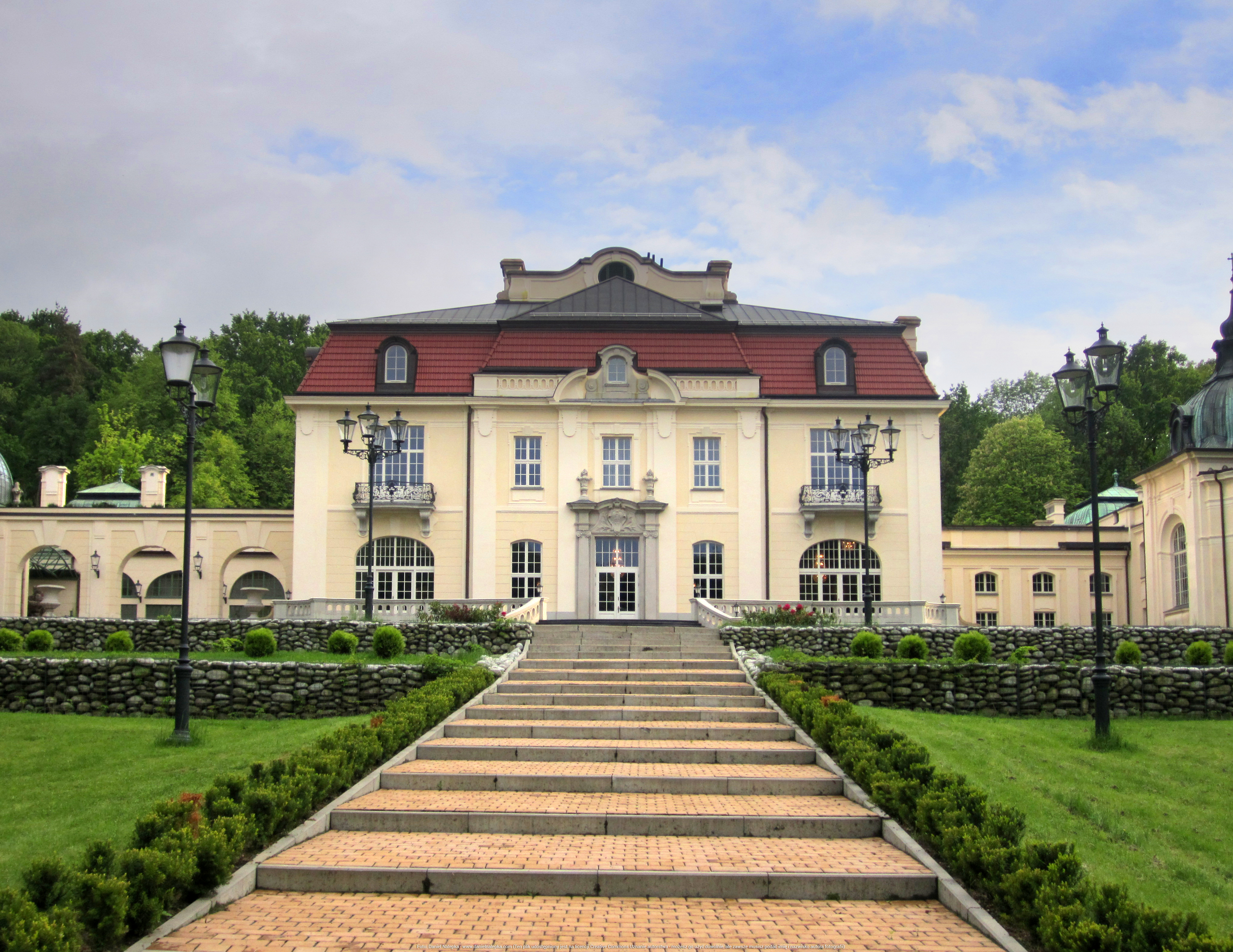
Goetz palace

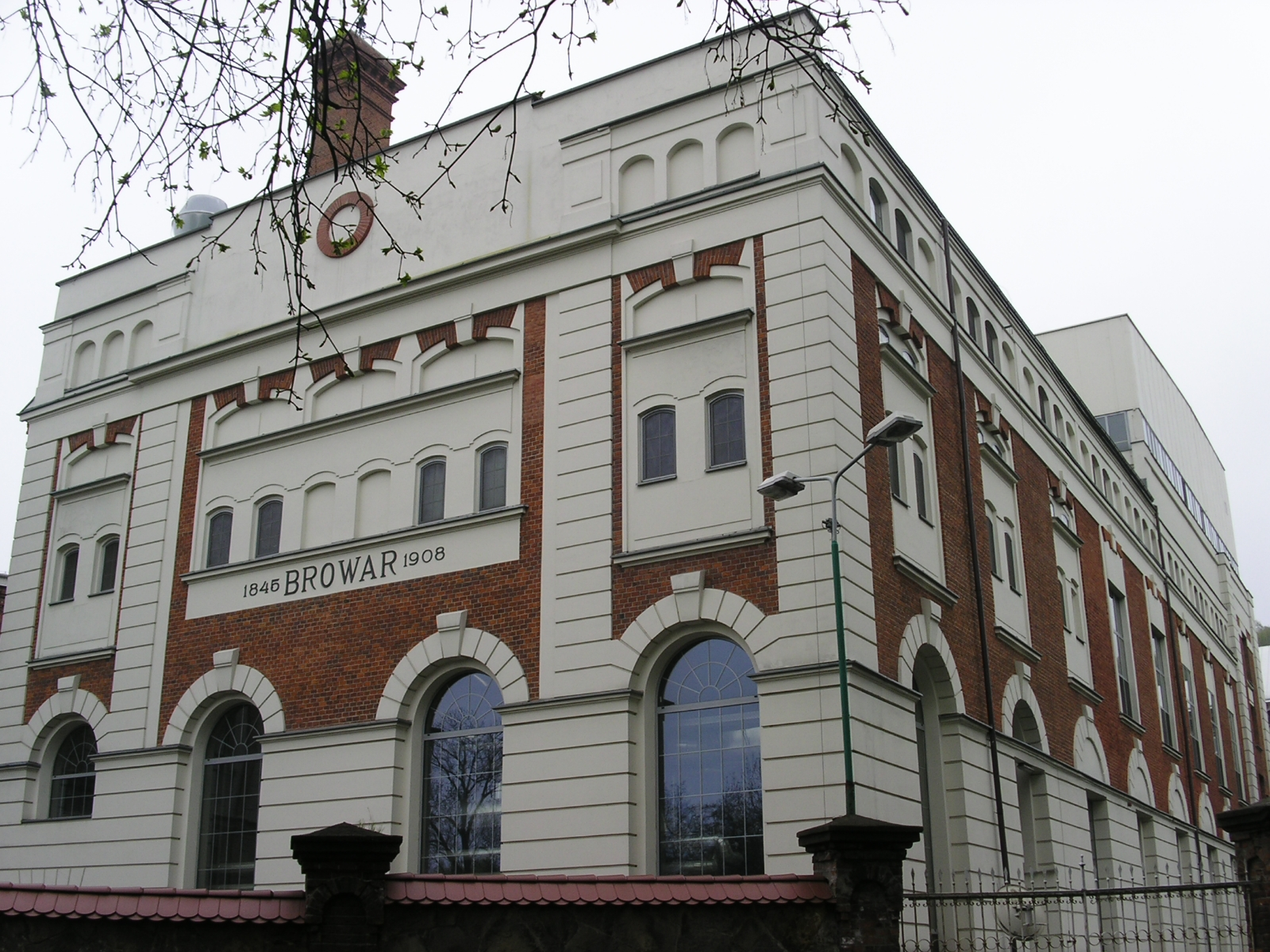
Okocim Brewery

In addition to its historical cemeteries points of cultural interest in Brzesko include the Goetz palace, built at the end of the 19th century by the Goetz family, and the adjoining English garden, a statue of Saint Florian, the city's patron originally erected in 1731 and restored after a city fire in 1904, a monument to the unknown soldier of World War I and the historic city hall (Ratusz) located in the city center.

== People ==
- Sabina Jakubowska (b. 1974), novelist and midwife
- Leszek Lubicz-Nycz (1899-1939), fencer
- Jolanta Ogar-Hill (b. 1982), sailor
- Mala Zimetbaum (1918-1944), Resistance fighter in World War II

== See also ==
- Brzesko Ghetto
- List of cities and towns in Poland
