= Okocim =

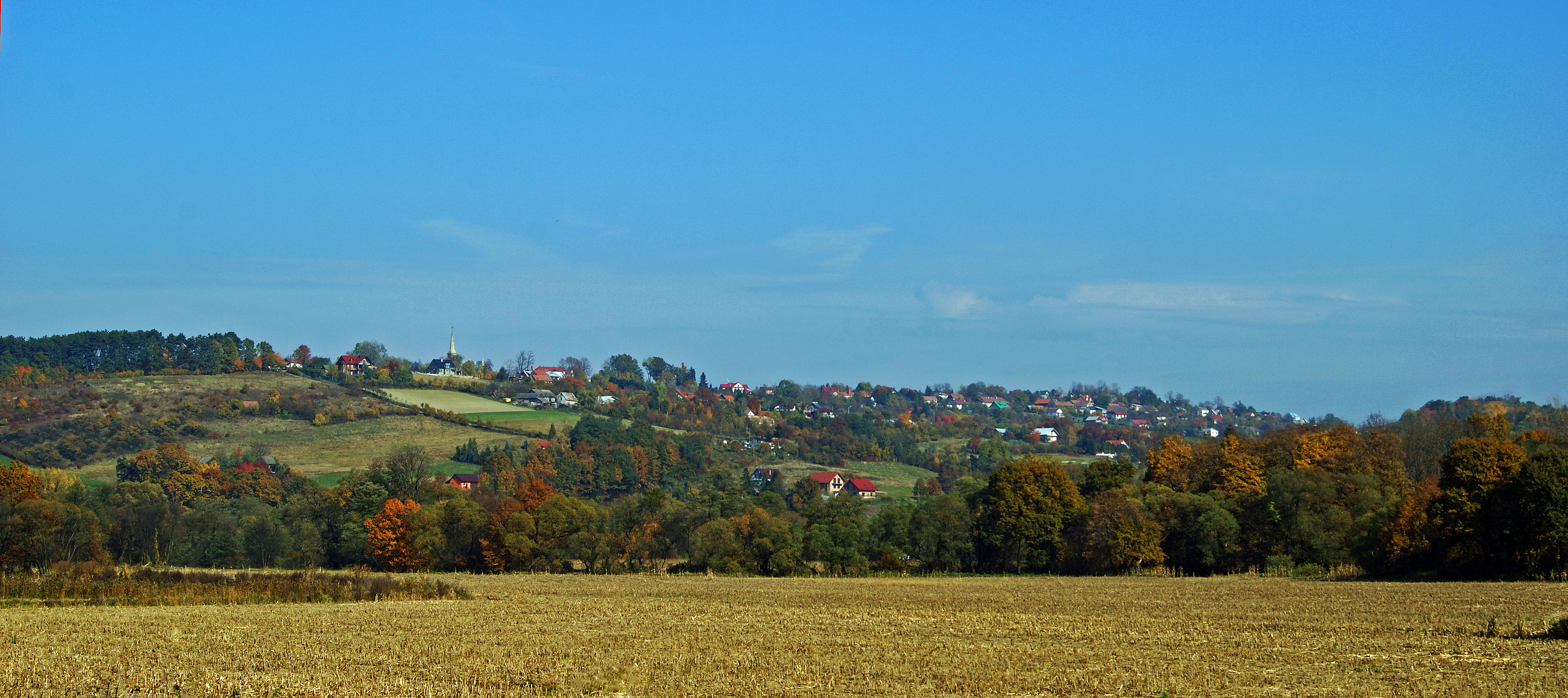
- Okocim seen from the southwest

- Location within Poland
- Coordinates: 49°56′51″N 20°36′28″E
- Country: Poland
- Voivodeship: Lesser Poland
- County: Brzesko
- Gmina: Brzesko

Population (2006)
  - Total: 1,900
- Time zone: UTC+1 (CET)
  - Summer (DST): UTC+2 (CEST)
- Postal code: 32-800
- Area code: +48 14
- Car plates: KBR

Okocim [ɔˈkɔt͡ɕim] is a village in Brzesko County, Lesser Poland Voivodeship, Poland. Less than 3 kilometres (2 mi) away from the village is Brzesko town. Okocim lies approximately 27 km (17 mi) south-west of Tarnów and 57 km (35 mi) east of the regional capital Kraków.

Since Polish administrative reorganization in 1999, Okocim is a part of Lesser Poland Voivodeship. Before the reorganization it was part of Tarnów Voivodeship (1975–1998).

The village is the birthpalce of Polish mathematician Władysław Orlicz (1903–1990).

== See also ==
- Okocim Brewery
