= Kisielina =

- Location within Poland

Location
- Country: Poland

Physical characteristics
- Source
  - location: near Łysa Góra, Lesser Poland Voivodeship
- Mouth
  - location: north of Nowopole, Lesser Poland Voivodeship
  - coordinates: 50°13′46″N 20°43′35″E
  - elevation: 171.1 m (561 ft)
- Length: 41.37 km (25.71 mi)
- Basin size: 166.2 km^{2} (64.2 sq mi)

Basin features
- Progression: Vistula→ Baltic Sea

Kisielina is a river in Poland. It flows for 41,37 km (25,7 mi) and feeds off a catchment area of 166,2 km² (64,2 sq mi) before feeding itself into the Vistula, being its right bank tributary.

The Kisielina starts on the northern slopes of the Dąbrowa hill in the vicinity of the village Łysa Góra in the Wiśnicz Foothills. It is joined by its tributaries: Pokrzywka, Upust (Ulga, right) and Zabawski Ditch (right).

The partial regulation of riverbed from Sufczyn to Biadoliny Szlacheckie took place from 2002 to 2005.

== See also ==
- List of rivers of Poland
