= Franciszek Bujak =

Polish academic and historian

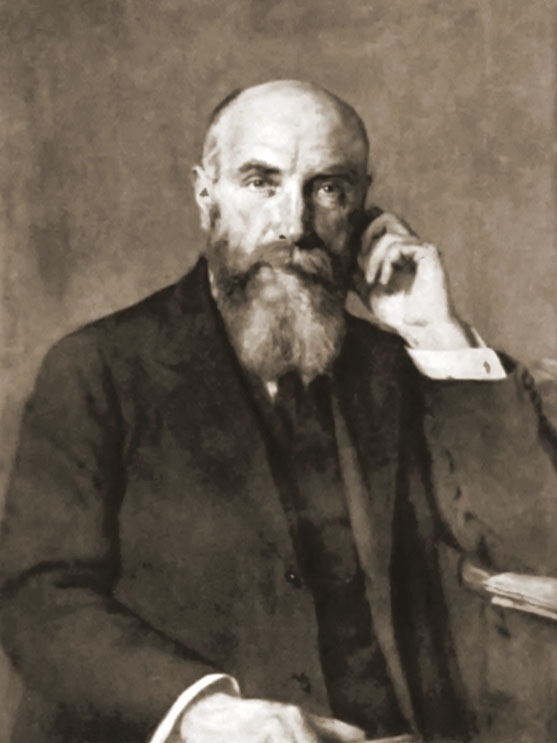
- Franciszek Bujak at the Jagiellonian University
- Born: 16 August 1875; Maszkienice near Brzesko, Poland
- Died: 21 March 1953 (aged 77); Kraków, Poland
- Occupations: Academic, Historian
- Years active: 1909–1952
- Employer: Jagiellonian University
- Known for: Research in economic, political, and social history of Poland
- Notable work: Badania Dziejów Społecznych i Gospodarczych
- Political party: Polish People's Party "Piast" (PSL), Stronnictwo Ludowe

Franciszek Bujak (16 August 1875, in Maszkienice near Brzesko - 21 March 1953, in Kraków) was a Polish academic and historian of economic, political and social history of Poland.

== Academic career ==
Bujak served as professor of the Jagiellonian University twice, from 1909 til 1918 before the re-emergence of Second Polish Republic, and after World War II from 1946 til 1952.

In the interwar Poland, Bujak was a professor of the Warsaw University from 1919 til 1921, and the John Casimir University in Lwów from 1921 until the outbreak of Operation Barbarossa in 1941.

Bujak was a member of the Polish Academy of Sciences since 1952, and president of the Polish Historical Society twice from 1932 til 1933 and from 1936 til 1937.

== Party-political activity ==
Bujak was active politically in the Polish People's Party "Piast" (PSL) and the Stronnictwo Ludowe.

== Ministerial post ==
Bujak briefly serving as minister of agriculture under Władysław Grabski.

== Academic research and publications ==
Bujak was the founder of an original research school of Poland's rural economic history. He published a series of scientific monographs on the history of Poland called Badania Dziejów Społecznych i Gospodarczych (1931–1950), and founded the academic journal Roczniki Dziejów Społecznych i Gospodarczych. He is the author of numerous dissertations on rural economics in Poland.

=== Before World War I ===
Bujak first groundbreaking analysis of the economic development generated by a village during the Partitions of Poland was published under the title Żmiąca wieś powiatu limanowskiego. Stosunki gospodarcze i społeczne in 1903. Wieś zachodniogalicyjska u schyłku XIX w was published in 1904. Studia nad osadnictwem Małopolski was published in 1905.

Prior to World War I, and shortly thereafter, Polish émigrés sent back remittance. American money accelerated the parceling of rural land in Poland, and manorial farms. The influx of money also triggered an increase in real estate prices and wages. In Polish villages, the number of small and large properties declined, while the number of medium sized properties increased. Bujak described the economic development of Ropczyce County in detail, here only 1,595 of 9,088 manorial farms survived. The remaining land was parceled, as at least 80 percent of families in Ropczyce County were sent remittance from America prior to World War I. Bujak called this economic process "a victory of smallholders", crediting American émigrés and their money. Polish smallholders in Ropczyce County could at the time only go to Prussia or Moravia to work in the seasonal industry, therefore their monetary contribution was insignificant.
