= Gmina Dębno =

Gmina Dębno may refer to either of the following administrative districts in Poland:

- Gmina Dębno, Lesser Poland Voivodeship
- Gmina Dębno, West Pomeranian Voivodeship
