= Cepelia Pavilion =

Modernist pavilion store in Warsaw, Poland

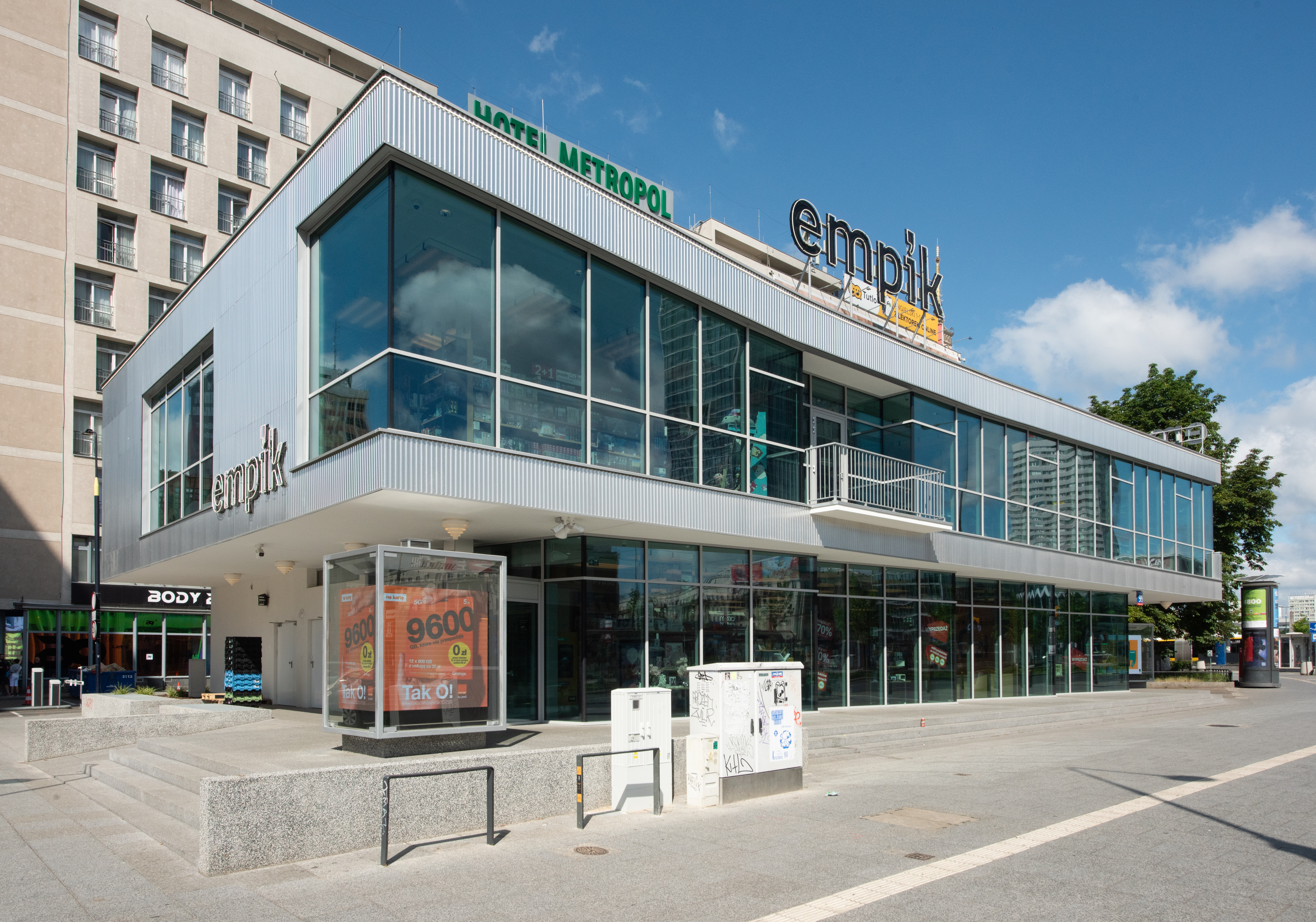
- The building in 2025

General information
- Type: Pavilion
- Architectural style: Modernist
- Location: 99/101 Marszałkowska Street; 28/34 Nowogrodzka Street; Downtown, Warsaw, Masovian Voivodeship, Poland
- Coordinates: 52°13′44.5″N 21°00′42.0″E
- Completed: 1966
- Renovated: 2024
- Owner: Sienna 111

Technical details
- Floor count: 2 (+1 underground)

Design and construction
- Architecture firm: Zygmunt Stępiński
- Developer: Cepelia

The Cepelia Pavilion (Polish: [t͡sɛˈpɛ.lia]; Polish: Pawilon Cepelii, Pawilon Cepelia) is a modernist store pavilion in the city of Warsaw in Masovian Voivodeship, Poland, within the neighbourhood of South Downtown. It is located at the corner of 99 and 101 Marszałkowska Street and 28 and 34 Nowogrodzka Street, next to Dmowski Roundabout. It was opened in 1966, as a store of Cepelia, an association of needlework artists. Following renovations in 2024, it currently operates as a store of Empik, a chain selling books, international press and media products. The building is included on the national heritage list.

== History ==
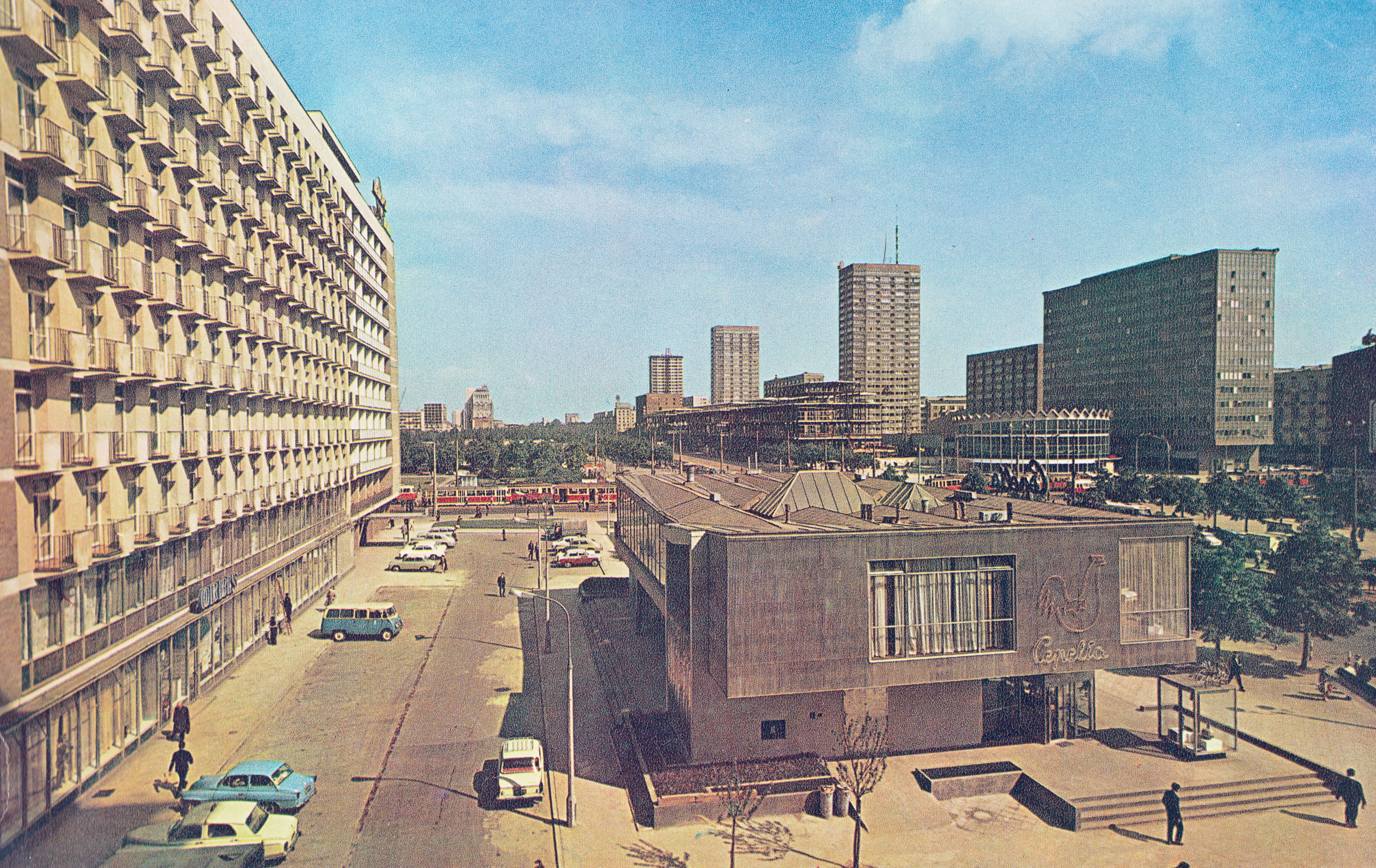
The Cepelia Pavilion around 1966.

The pavilion was designed by Zygmunt Stępiński, in cooperation with Andrzej Milewski and Aleksander Haweman. It was constructed in 1966, next to the Metropol Hotel, opened a year prior, as part of the development of shopping and residential buildings alongside Marszałkowska Street. Its façade, aside from windows, was originally covered in turquoise ceramic tiles, each decorated with unique geometrical patterns, designed by Stanisław Kucharski, and manufactured by the company Spółdzielnia Pracy Przemysłu Ludowego i Artystycznego Kamionka based in Łysa Góra. Its construction was halted a few times, among other reasons, because of the issues with the developers, as well as the difficulties with selecting and sourcing appropriate steel, aluminum and large pieces of glass. The building was finished on 30 March 1966, and was ceremonially opened on 15 April of the same year. The next day, a store of Cepelia, an association of needlework artists, was opened inside. A neon sign with a logo of Cepelia, depicting a rooster, and the name of the company, was placed on the building's façade. The building featured 1,200 m^{2} (12,916.69 sq ft) commercial and exhibition floor area. The artworks were also displayed in glass display cases outside the building.

In the 1990s, the pavilion fell into decline. Several large advertisement billboards and digital displays were installed on its sides and roof, and its basement housed a night club. In 2017, the building was entered onto the municipal heritage list of the city of Warsaw, and in 2019, on the voivodeship harimanage list. In 2017, the building was entered into the municipal heritage list of Warsaw, and in 2018, it was entered into the national heritage list.

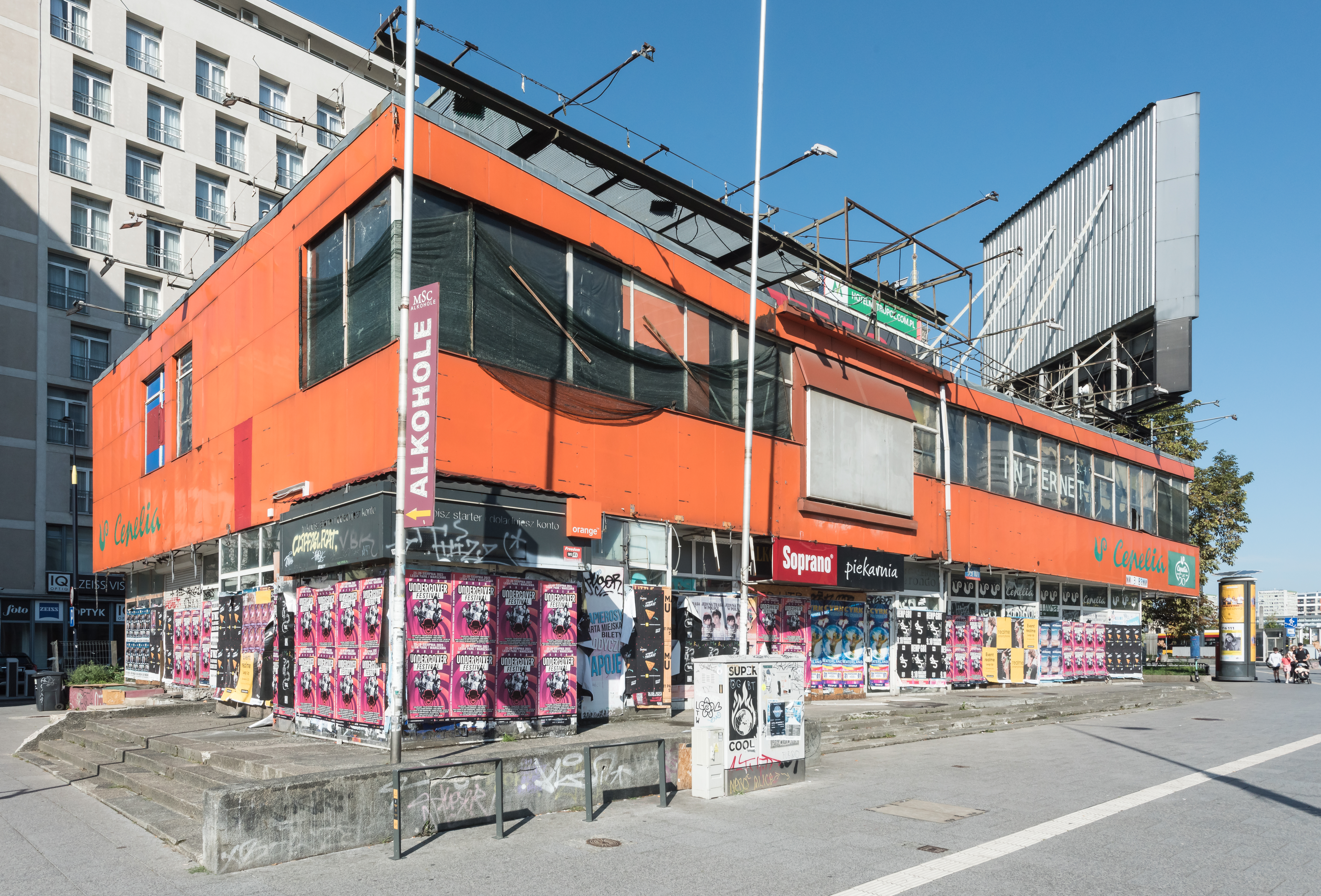
The building in 2023, prior to the renovation.

The building was eventually sold by Cepelia to the company Sienna 111. Originally, it was planned for the building to become a McDonald’s restaurant, following a renovation and modernisation. In 2019, the voivodeship conservator-restorer rejected the project, arguing with it being too large of an interference with the heritage of the building. The developer made an appeal to the Ministry of Culture and National Heritage, which repealed said decision, and ordered for the matter to be reevaluated. McDonald's eventually backed out from opening its restaurant, and in 2022, the Office for Heritage Protection Office gave an evaluation, allowing for development, remodelling and renovation on the building, allowing for a department store to take its place.

In 2023, due to danger of further damage of the deteriorated building, the conservator-restorer issued a decision, with orders for imminent execution, to begin renovations of the pavilion, and for the removal of the advertisement billboards. The restoration project was designed by Andrzej M. Chołdzyński. The renovations begun in February 2024. The restorations included installing metal panels on the façade, ceramic tiles on the ground floor, and billboards next to the pavilion. A fragment of the original façade, made from waved aluminium sheet metal, alongside with a neon of the logo of Cepelia, were preserved on the southern wall, on the side of Nowogrodzka Street. A flagpole was placed next to the building, being inspired by the original design by Stępiński, which envisioned and but never utilised this featutre. The pavilion was reopened on 13 December 2024, as a store of Empik, a chain selling books, international press and media products. In 2025, the building received the Architectural Award of the Mayor of the Capital City of Warsaw, in the category The New Life of Buildings.

== Architecture ==
The two-storey pavilion with streel and aluminium construction with facade covered in large windows and white waved metal sheets. From the side of Nowogrodzka Street, is installed a neon of a rooster, a logo of the building's original owener, Cepelia. The pavilion has a one additional underground floor. Next to the building stands a flag pole.

== Awards ==
- 2024 Architectural Award of the Mayor of the Capital City of Warsaw, in the category The New Life of Buildings (2025)
