= Sufczyn, Lesser Poland Voivodeship =

Sufczyn
- Village
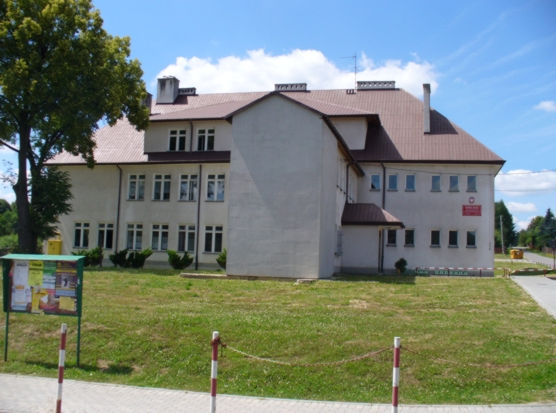
- School

- Location within Poland
- Coordinates: 49°56′N 20°45′E
- Country: Poland
- Voivodeship: Lesser Poland
- County: Brzesko
- Gmina: Dębno
- Population (approx.): 2,000

Sufczyn [ˈsuft͡ʂɨn] is a village in the administrative district of Gmina Dębno, within Brzesko County, Lesser Poland Voivodeship, in southern Poland.

The village has an approximate population of 2,000.
