= Jaworsko =

- Village
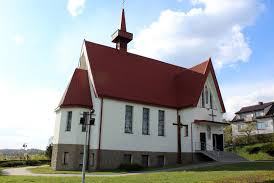
- Catholic church

- Location within Poland
- Coordinates: 49°54′N 20°45′E
- Country: Poland
- Voivodeship: Lesser Poland
- County: Brzesko
- Gmina: Dębno

Jaworsko [jaˈvɔrskɔ] is a village in the administrative district of Gmina Dębno, in Brzesko County, Lesser Poland Voivodeship, in southern Poland.
