= Biadoliny Szlacheckie =

- Village
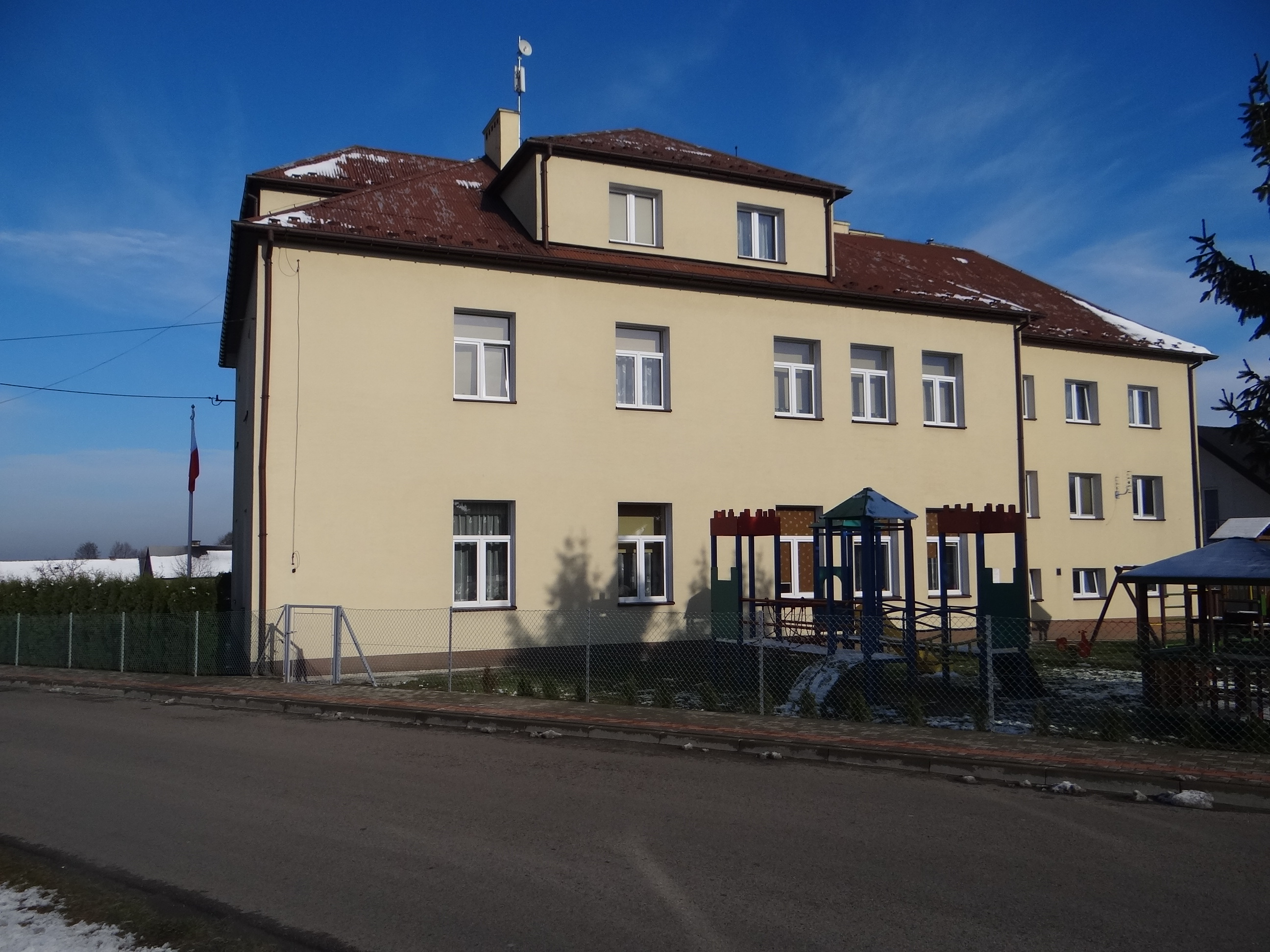

- Location within Poland
- Coordinates: 49°59′54″N 20°45′2″E
- Country: Poland
- Voivodeship: Lesser Poland
- County: Brzesko
- Gmina: Dębno

Biadoliny Szlacheckie [bjadɔˈlinɨ ʂlaˈxɛt͡skʲɛ] is a village in the administrative district of Gmina Dębno, within Brzesko County, Lesser Poland Voivodeship, in southern Poland.

There is a railway station in the village.
