= Dębno, Brzesko County =

Dębno
- Village
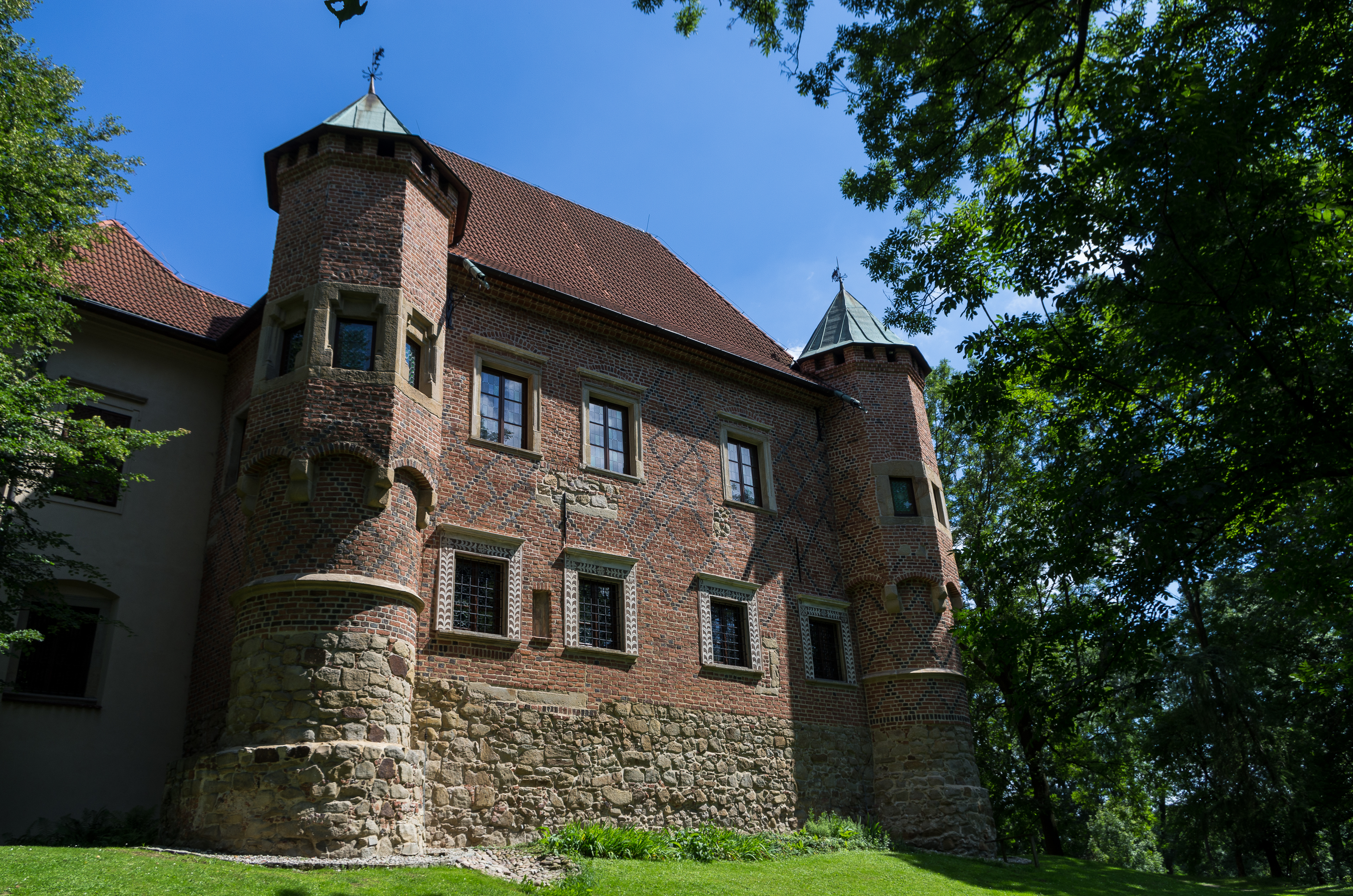
- Dębno Castle

- Location within Poland
- Coordinates: 49°57′7″N 20°42′50″E
- Country: Poland
- Voivodeship: Lesser Poland
- County: Brzesko
- Gmina: Dębno
- Population: 1,400
- Website: http://www.gminadebno.pl

Dębno [ˈdɛmbnɔ] is a village in Brzesko County, Lesser Poland Voivodeship, in southern Poland. It is the seat of the gmina (administrative district) called Gmina Dębno.
