= Porąbka Uszewska =

- Village
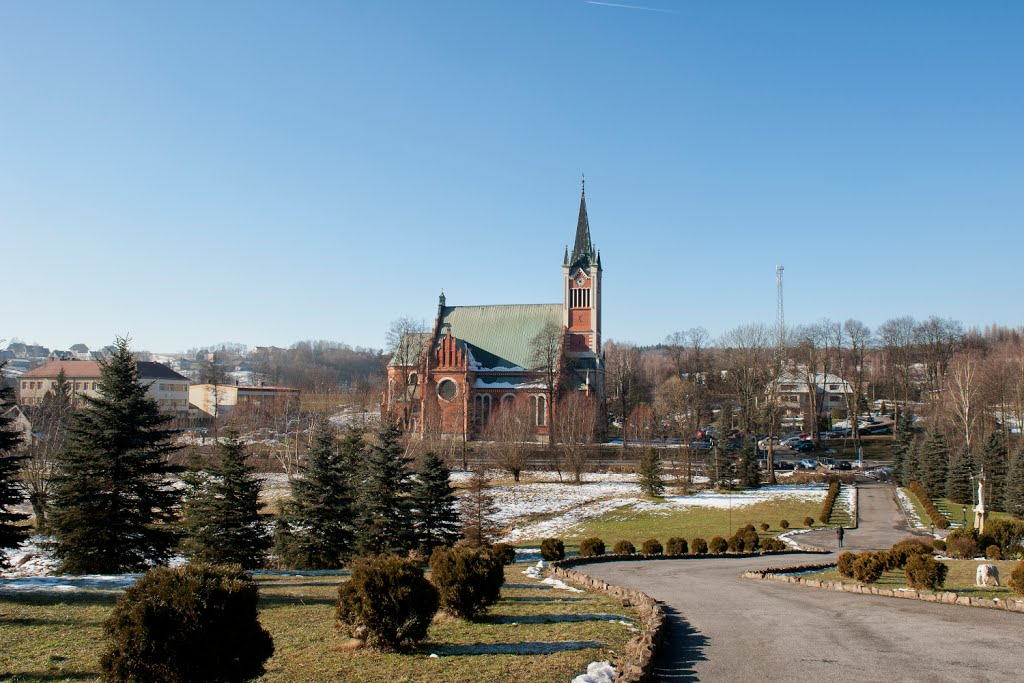

- Location within Poland
- Coordinates: 49°57′N 20°43′E
- Country: Poland
- Voivodeship: Lesser Poland
- County: Brzesko
- Gmina: Dębno
- Population: 1,300

Porąbka Uszewska [pɔˈrɔmpka uˈʂɛfska] is a village in the administrative district of Gmina Dębno, within Brzesko County, Lesser Poland Voivodeship, in southern Poland.
