= Jastew =

- Village
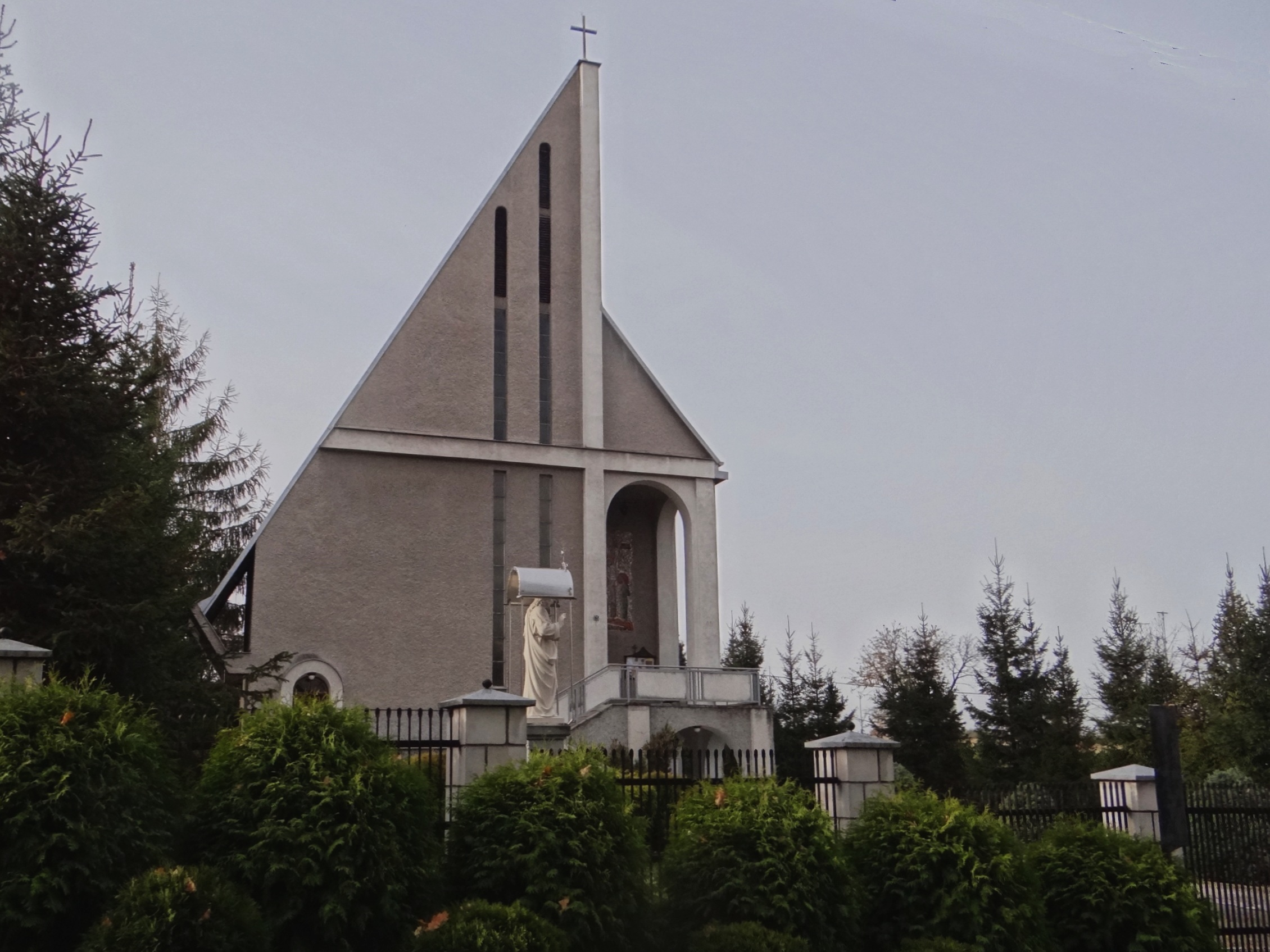
- Catholic church

- Location within Poland
- Coordinates: 49°58′N 20°40′E
- Country: Poland
- Voivodeship: Lesser Poland
- County: Brzesko
- Gmina: Dębno
- Population: 550

Jastew [ˈjastɛf] is a village in the administrative district of Gmina Dębno, within Brzesko County, Lesser Poland Voivodeship, in southern Poland.
