= Dębno Castle =

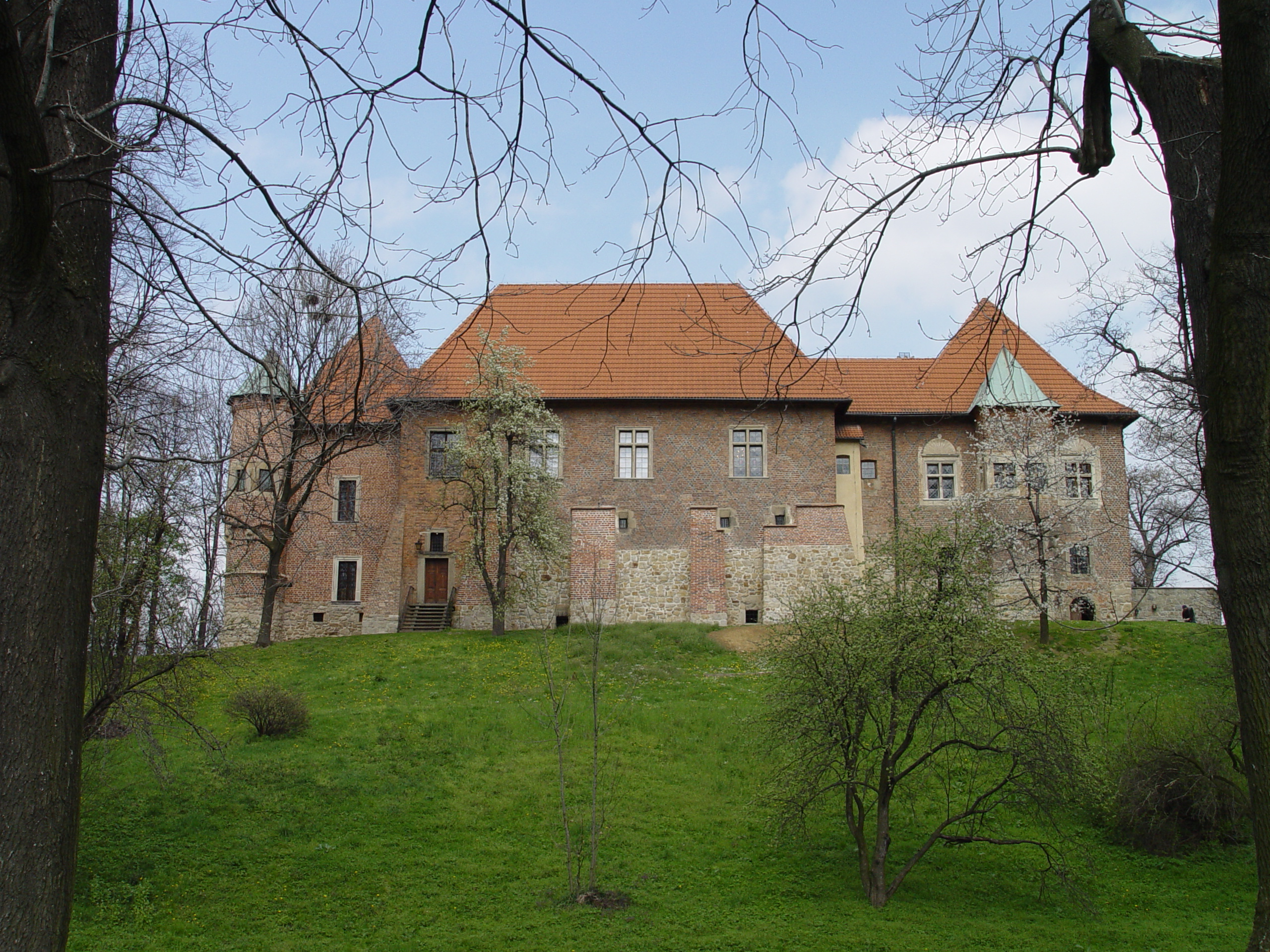
- Interactive map of the Dębno Castle area

General information
- Architectural style: Polish Gothic
- Location: Dębno., Poland
- Coordinates: 49°57′51.26″N 20°42′56.09″E
- Construction started: 1470
- Completed: 1480

Dębno Castle is a late Gothic complex, built in 1470 to 1480 by Chancellor of the Crown and Kasztelan of Kraków, Jakub Dębiński (also known as Jakub z Dębna), in the southern Polish village of Dębno. It is located a few hundred meters south of the international European route E40.

== History ==
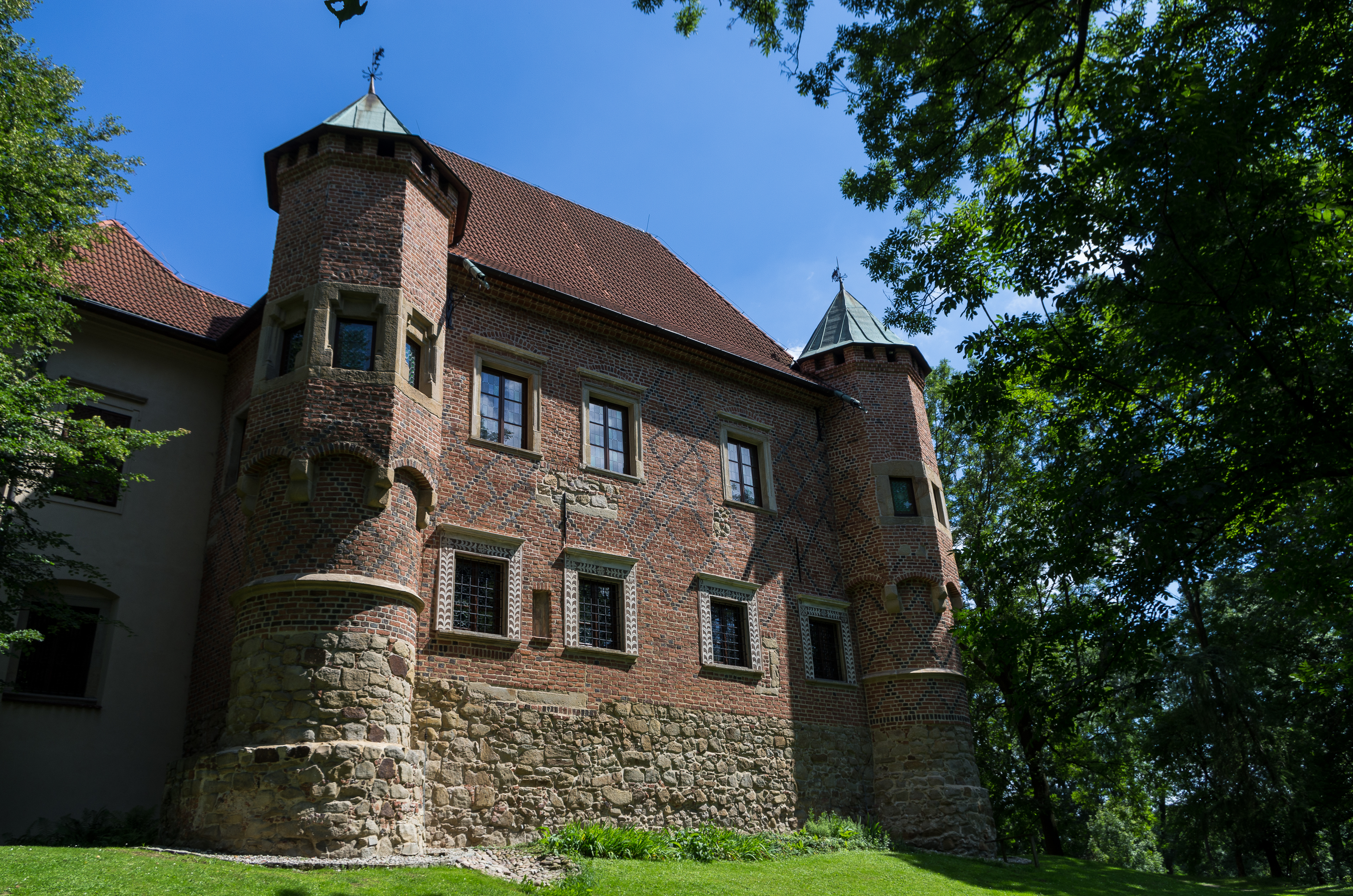
Dębno castle, view of the southern wing

Before the stone castle was built, a complex made of wood and earth had existed on the location. It probably belonged to komes Świętoslaw of the noble Gryfita family, Kasztelan of Wiślica. Sometime in the mid-14th century, Dębno passed into the hands of the influential Odrowąż family, to which Jakub z Dębna, founder of the castle, belonged. In 1586 the castle was rebuilt in a Renaissance style. At that time it belonged to a Hungarian nobleman Ferenc Wesselini, secretary of King Stephen Báthory. In the late 18th century, another remodeling took place, ordered by the Tarło family, who were then-owners of the castle. The Tarło coat of arms and the date 1772 can still be seen on the baroque portal. Also, at that time, a part of the northern wing of the castle was added.

Throughout the years, Dębno castle changed hands several times. It belonged to a number of noble Polish families - Lanckoroński, Rogowski, Rudnicki, Spławski (who in 1831 hosted there refugees of the November Uprising), Jastrzębski. Even though owners carried out numerous remodeling projects, the castle did not change its original look. Today it consists of four rectangular segments, which make an internal, rectangular courtyard with a well. The gate goes through a Baroque portal. Lavlishly furnished rooms on upper floors were occupied by owners, while domestic workers lived on the ground floor. The castle used to be surrounded by a moat; at present, there is a permanent wooden bridge leading to the gate.

In 1945, the castle was taken over by the government of Poland, and between 1970 and 1978, it was renovated. Since 1978, Dębno castle has been home to a branch of the Tarnów Regional Museum.

== See also ==
- Castles in Poland
