= Wola Dębińska =

- Village
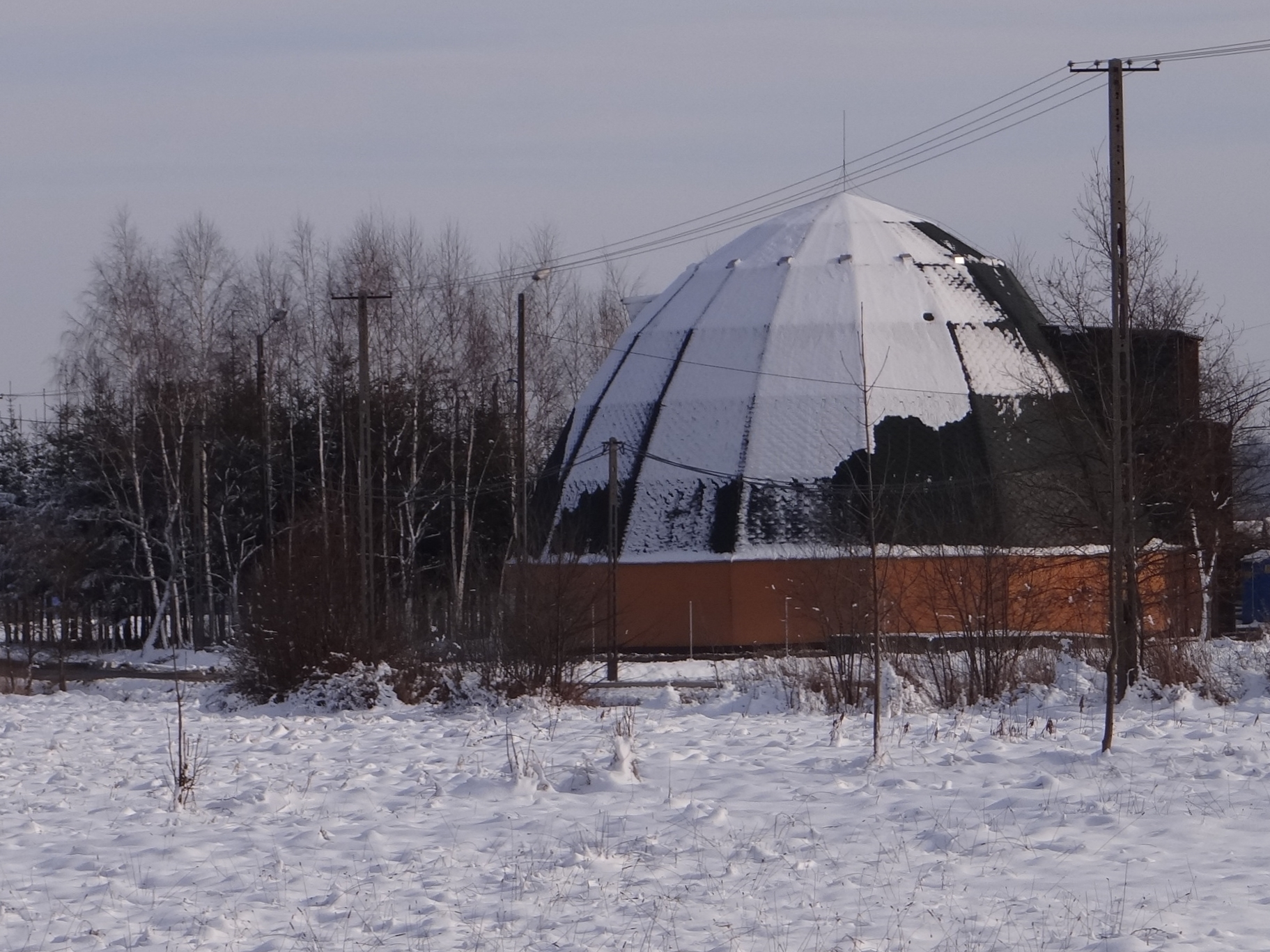

- Location within Poland
- Coordinates: 49°59′N 20°43′E
- Country: Poland
- Voivodeship: Lesser Poland
- County: Brzesko
- Gmina: Dębno

Wola Dębińska [ˈvɔla dɛmˈbiɲska] is a village in the administrative district of Gmina Dębno, within Brzesko County, Lesser Poland Voivodeship, in southern Poland.
