= Doły, Lesser Poland Voivodeship =

Doły
- Village
- Location within Poland
- Coordinates: 49°55′N 20°41′E
- Country: Poland
- Voivodeship: Lesser Poland
- County: Brzesko
- Gmina: Dębno

Doły [ˈdɔwɨ] is a village in the administrative district of Gmina Dębno, within Brzesko County, Lesser Poland Voivodeship, in southern Poland.
