= Gmina Dębno, Lesser Poland Voivodeship =

Gmina Dębno Dębno Commune
- Gmina
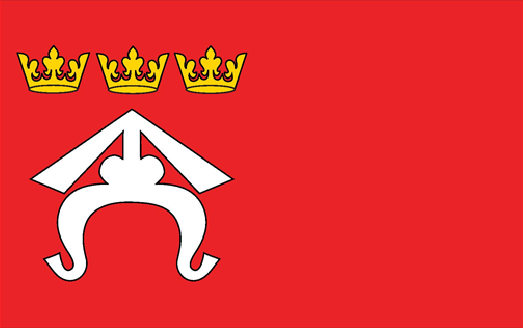
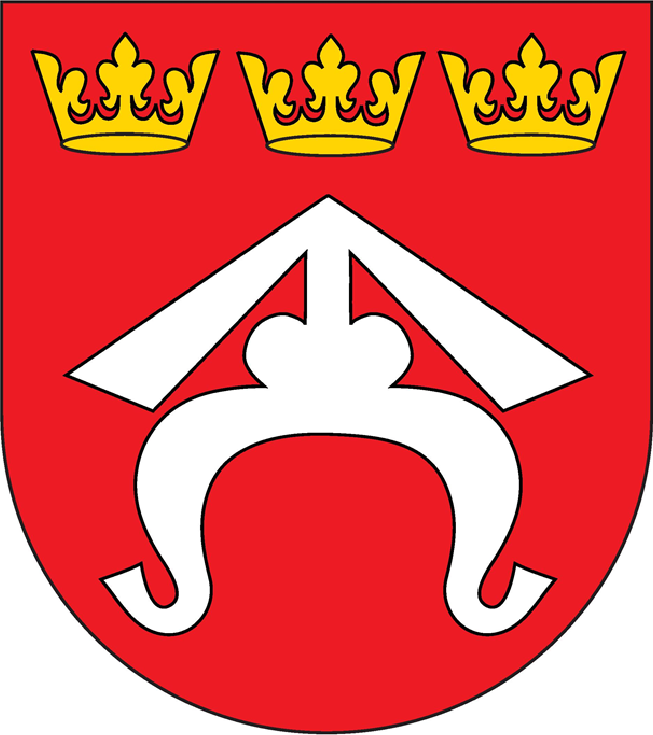
- Flag Coat of arms
- Interactive map of Gmina Dębno
- Coordinates (Dębno): 49°57′7″N 20°42′50″E
- Country: Poland
- Voivodeship: Lesser Poland
- County: Brzesko
- Seat: Dębno

Area
  - Total: 81.51 km^{2} (31.47 sq mi)

Population (2006)
  - Total: 13,965
  - Density: 171.3/km^{2} (443.7/sq mi)
- Website: http://www.gminadebno.pl/

Gmina Dębno is a rural gmina (administrative district) in Brzesko County, Lesser Poland Voivodeship, in southern Poland. Its seat is the village of Dębno, which lies approximately 8 kilometres (5 mi) east of Brzesko and 57 km (35 mi) east of the regional capital Kraków.

The gmina covers an area of 81.51 square kilometres (31.5 sq mi), and as of 2006 its total population is 13,965.

== Villages ==
Gmina Dębno contains the villages and settlements of Biadoliny Szlacheckie, Dębno, Doły, Jastew, Jaworsko, Łoniowa, Łysa Góra, Maszkienice, Niedźwiedza, Perła, Porąbka Uszewska, Sufczyn and Wola Dębińska.

== Neighbouring gminas ==
Gmina Dębno is bordered by the gminas of Borzęcin, Brzesko, Czchów, Gnojnik, Wojnicz and Zakliczyn.
