= Maszkienice =

- Village
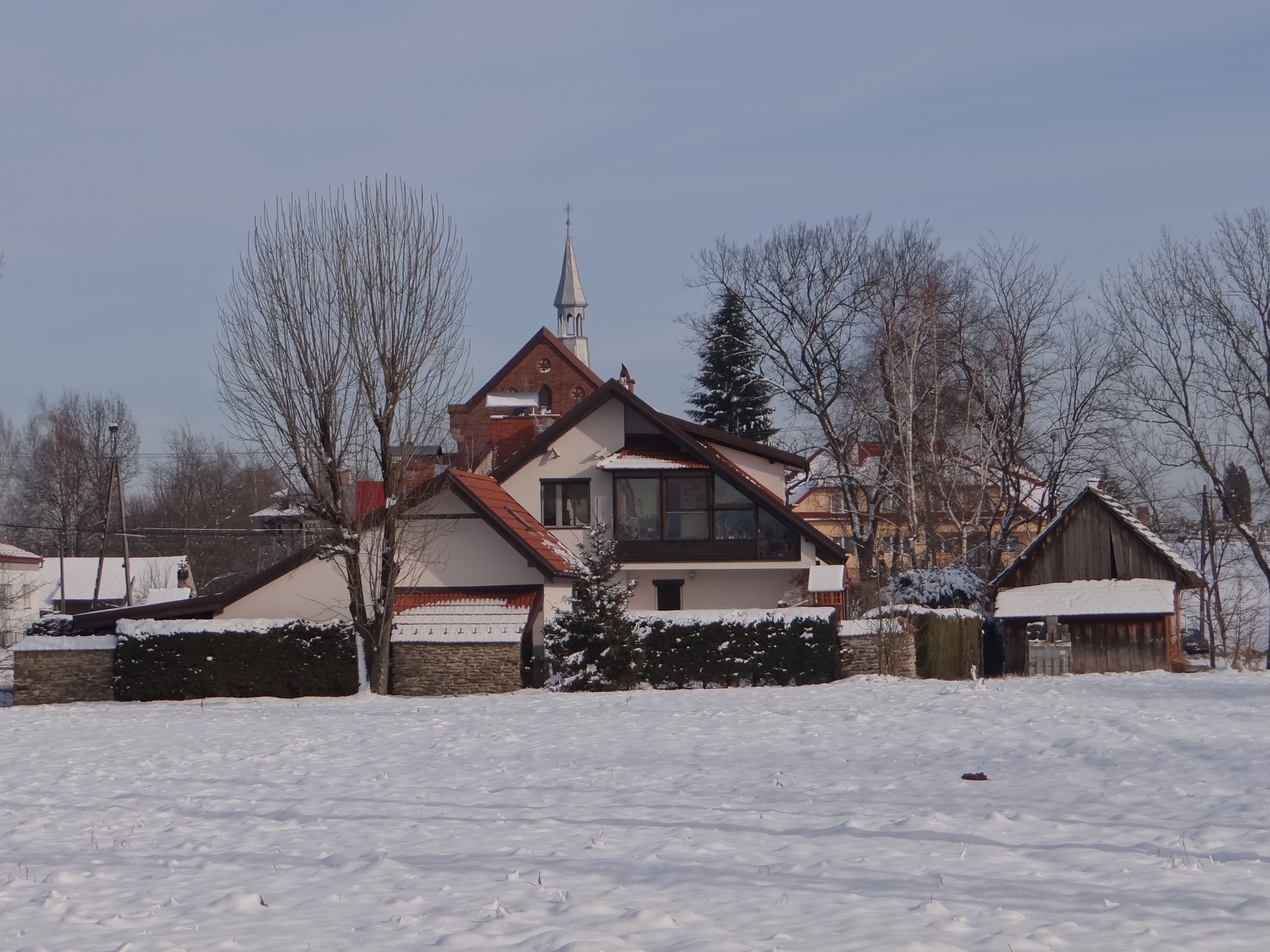

- Location within Poland
- Coordinates: 49°59′N 20°41′E
- Country: Poland
- Voivodeship: Lesser Poland
- County: Brzesko
- Gmina: Dębno

Maszkienice [maʂkʲɛˈnit͡sɛ] (Polish pronunciation) is a village in the administrative district of Gmina Dębno, within Brzesko County, Lesser Poland Voivodeship, in southern Poland.

The history of Maszkienice dates back to letters of King Casimir the Great in 1336.

The village of Maszkienice is served by the Roman Catholic Parish of Saint Joseph the Craftsman, located in the center of the village.

The village is home to amateur football club LKS Sokół Maszkienice. The club was founded in 1948 and is currently playing in the Polish Liga Okręgowa, the 6th tier of Polish football. The club offers a senior side, junior side, and youth division. The club grounds and offices are located on Ul. Podlesie.

Maszkienice is accessible by railway via the station in nearby Sterkowiec, with regular service connecting Kraków, Tarnów and Krynica-Zdrój.

Recently, a new supermarket, Delikatesy Centrum, was opened next to the Sterkowiec train station, allowing residents of Maszkienice to travel shorter distances for meat, vegetables and other items.

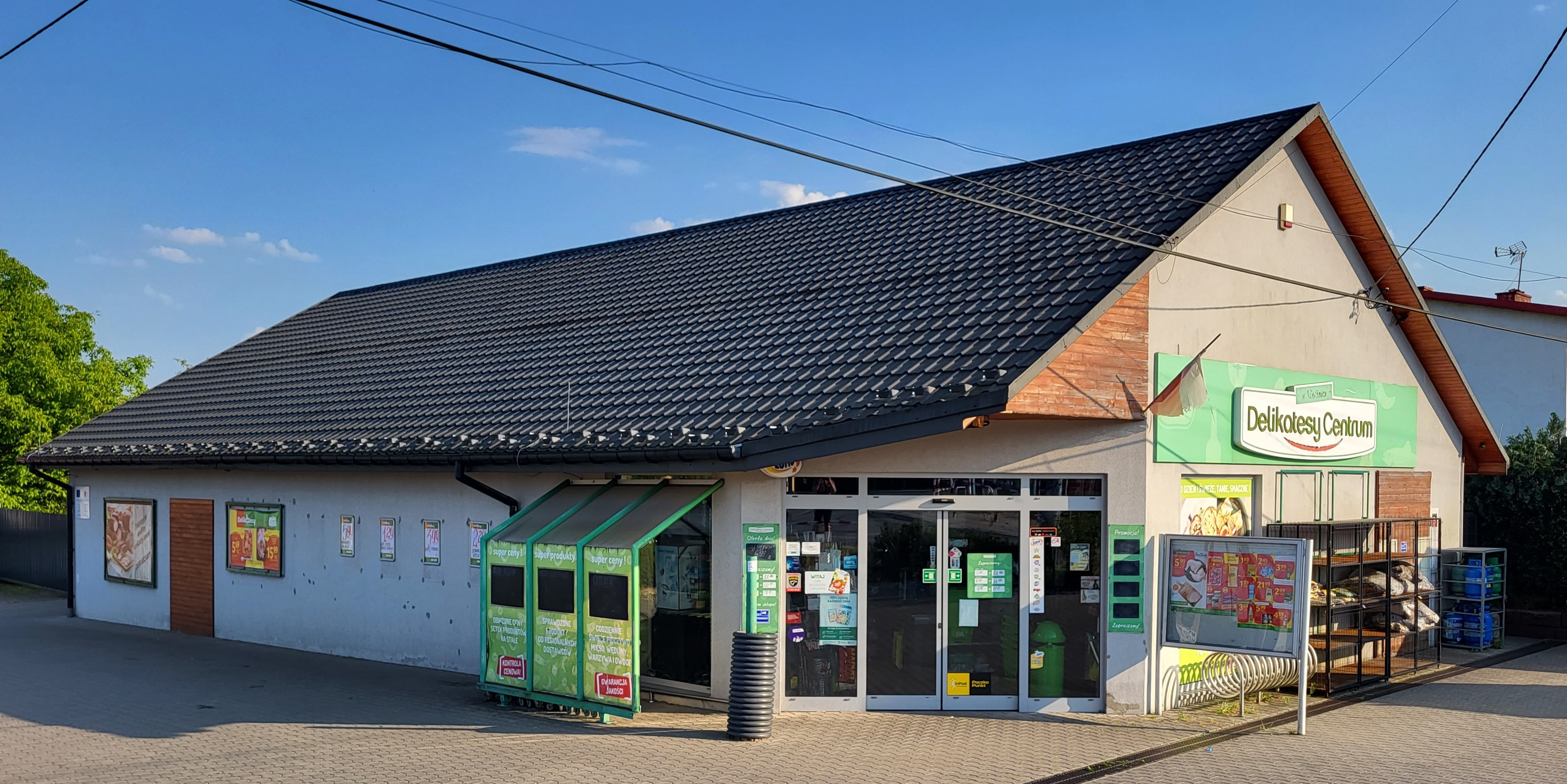
Delikatesy Centrum in Maszkienice
