= Łysa Góra, Lesser Poland Voivodeship =

Łysa Góra
- Village
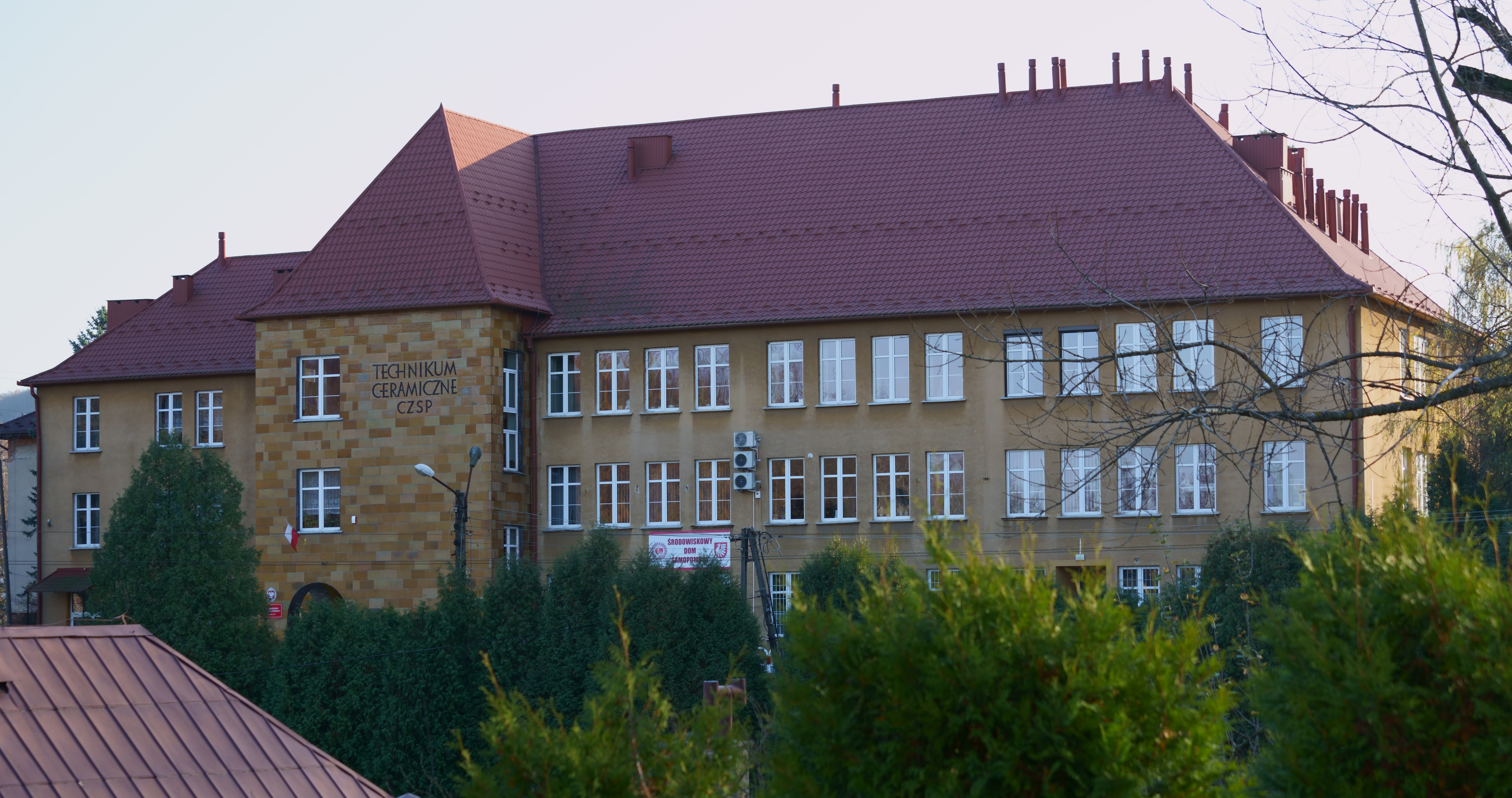
- Secondary school

- Location within Poland
- Coordinates: 49°55′N 20°44′E
- Country: Poland
- Voivodeship: Lesser Poland
- County: Brzesko
- Gmina: Dębno
- Population: 1,600

Łysa Góra [ˈwɨsa ˈɡura] is a village in the administrative district of Gmina Dębno, within Brzesko County, Lesser Poland Voivodeship, in southern Poland.
