= Zawierzbie =

Zawierzbie may refer to the following places:

- Zawierzbie, Lesser Poland Voivodeship (south Poland)
- Zawierzbie, Subcarpathian Voivodeship (south-east Poland)
- Zawierzbie, Świętokrzyskie Voivodeship (south-central Poland)
