= Żelichowska =

Żelichowska may refer to:

People

- Aleksandra Żelichowska (born 1984), Polish figure skater

Geography

- Kuźnica Żelichowska, village in Czarnków-Trzcianka County, Greater Poland Voivodeship, in west-central Poland
- Pilcza Żelichowska, village in Dąbrowa County, Lesser Poland Voivodeship, in southern Poland
- Wola Żelichowska, village in Dąbrowa County, Lesser Poland Voivodeship, in southern Poland

== See also ==
- Żelechowa
- Żelichów (disambiguation)
