= Kobierniki, Świętokrzyskie Voivodeship =

Kobierniki
- Village
- Location within Poland
- Coordinates: 50°40′57″N 21°42′50″E
- Country: Poland
- Voivodeship: Świętokrzyskie
- County: Sandomierz
- Gmina: Samborzec

Kobierniki [kɔbjɛrˈniki] is a village in the administrative district of Gmina Samborzec, within Sandomierz County, Świętokrzyskie Voivodeship, in south-central Poland. It lies approximately 6 km (4 mi) north-east of Samborzec, 3 km (2 mi) west of Sandomierz, and 81 km (50 mi) east of the regional capital Kielce.

== See also ==
- The Lesser Polish Way
