= Wielogóra =

Wielogóra may refer to the following places in Poland:

- Wielogóra, Świętokrzyskie Voivodeship (south-central Poland)
- Wielogóra, Masovian Voivodeship (east-central Poland)
