= Ostrołęka (disambiguation) =

Ostrołęka may refer to the following places:

- Ostrołęka, Pajęczno County in Łódź Voivodeship (central Poland)
- Ostrołęka, Zgierz County in Łódź Voivodeship (central Poland)
- Ostrołęka in Masovian Voivodeship (east-central Poland)
- Ostrołęka, Świętokrzyskie Voivodeship (south-central Poland)
- Ostrołęka, Grójec County in Masovian Voivodeship (east-central Poland)
- Ostrołęka, Radom County in Masovian Voivodeship (east-central Poland)
