= Śmiechowice =

Śmiechowice may refer to:

- Śmiechowice, Opole Voivodeship, Poland
- Śmiechowice, Świętokrzyskie Voivodeship, Poland
