= Zawisełcze =

- Village
- Location within Poland
- Coordinates: 50°39′50″N 21°43′18″E
- Country: Poland
- Voivodeship: Świętokrzyskie
- County: Sandomierz
- Gmina: Samborzec
- Population: 250

Zawisełcze [zaviˈsɛu̯t͡ʂɛ] is a village in the administrative district of Gmina Samborzec, within Sandomierz County, Świętokrzyskie Voivodeship, in south-central Poland. It lies approximately 5 km (3 mi) east of Samborzec, 3 km (2 mi) south-west of Sandomierz, and 82 km (51 mi) east of the regional capital Kielce.
