= Bystrojowice =

- Village
- Location within Poland
- Coordinates: 50°39′N 21°36′E
- Country: Poland
- Voivodeship: Świętokrzyskie
- County: Sandomierz
- Gmina: Samborzec

Bystrojowice [bɨstrɔjɔˈvit͡sɛ] is a village in the administrative district of Gmina Samborzec, within Sandomierz County, Świętokrzyskie Voivodeship, in south-central Poland. It lies approximately 5 km (3 mi) west of Samborzec, 12 km (7 mi) west of Sandomierz, and 74 km (46 mi) east of the regional capital Kielce.
