= Ryłowice =

- Village
- Location within Poland
- Coordinates: 50°38′N 21°33′E
- Country: Poland
- Voivodeship: Świętokrzyskie
- County: Sandomierz
- Gmina: Samborzec

Ryłowice [rɨwɔˈvit͡sɛ] is a village in the administrative district of Gmina Samborzec, within Sandomierz County, Świętokrzyskie Voivodeship, in south-central Poland. It lies approximately 8 km (5 mi) west of Samborzec, 16 km (10 mi) west of Sandomierz, and 72 km (45 mi) south-east of the regional capital Kielce.
