= Andruszkowice =

- Village
- Location within Poland
- Coordinates: 50°40′5″N 21°41′56″E
- Country: Poland
- Voivodeship: Świętokrzyskie
- County: Sandomierz
- Gmina: Samborzec
- Population: 210

Andruszkowice [andruʂkɔˈvit͡sɛ] is a village in the administrative district of Gmina Samborzec, within Sandomierz County, Świętokrzyskie Voivodeship, in south-central Poland. It lies approximately 4 km (2 mi) north-east of Samborzec, 4 km (2 mi) south-west of Sandomierz, and 80 km (50 mi) east of the regional capital Kielce.

In August 2024, a study of the Andruszkowice population found an exceptionally small amount of genetic diversity, with up to 50% of the population displaying a low degree of genetic distance in both the X and Y chromosome.

== See also ==
- The Lesser Polish Way
