= Szewce, Sandomierz County =

Szewce
- Village
- Location within Poland
- Coordinates: 50°37′50″N 21°38′20″E
- Country: Poland
- Voivodeship: Świętokrzyskie
- County: Sandomierz
- Gmina: Samborzec

Government
  - Mayor: Tomasz Kwiecień
- Population: 234
- Vehicle registration: TSA

Szewce [ˈʂɛft͡sɛ] is a village in the administrative district of Gmina Samborzec, within Sandomierz County, Świętokrzyskie Voivodeship, in south-central Poland. It lies approximately 3 km (2 mi) south-west of Samborzec, 10 km (6 mi) south-west of Sandomierz, and 78 km (48 mi) east of the regional capital Kielce.

== Demographics ==
The village is wholly Polish in population and entirely Roman Catholic. Almost all of the inhabitants farm, with common crops being apples, cucumbers, tomatoes and a token amount of livestock including chicken, duck and swine. The town lacks churches, schools, stores, or any sort of municipal building but does have a volunteer fire brigade.

Szewce features only one paved road (79) which runs to Sandomierz and one unpaved road with no signage which runs to Skotniki.
