= Gorzyczany =

- Village
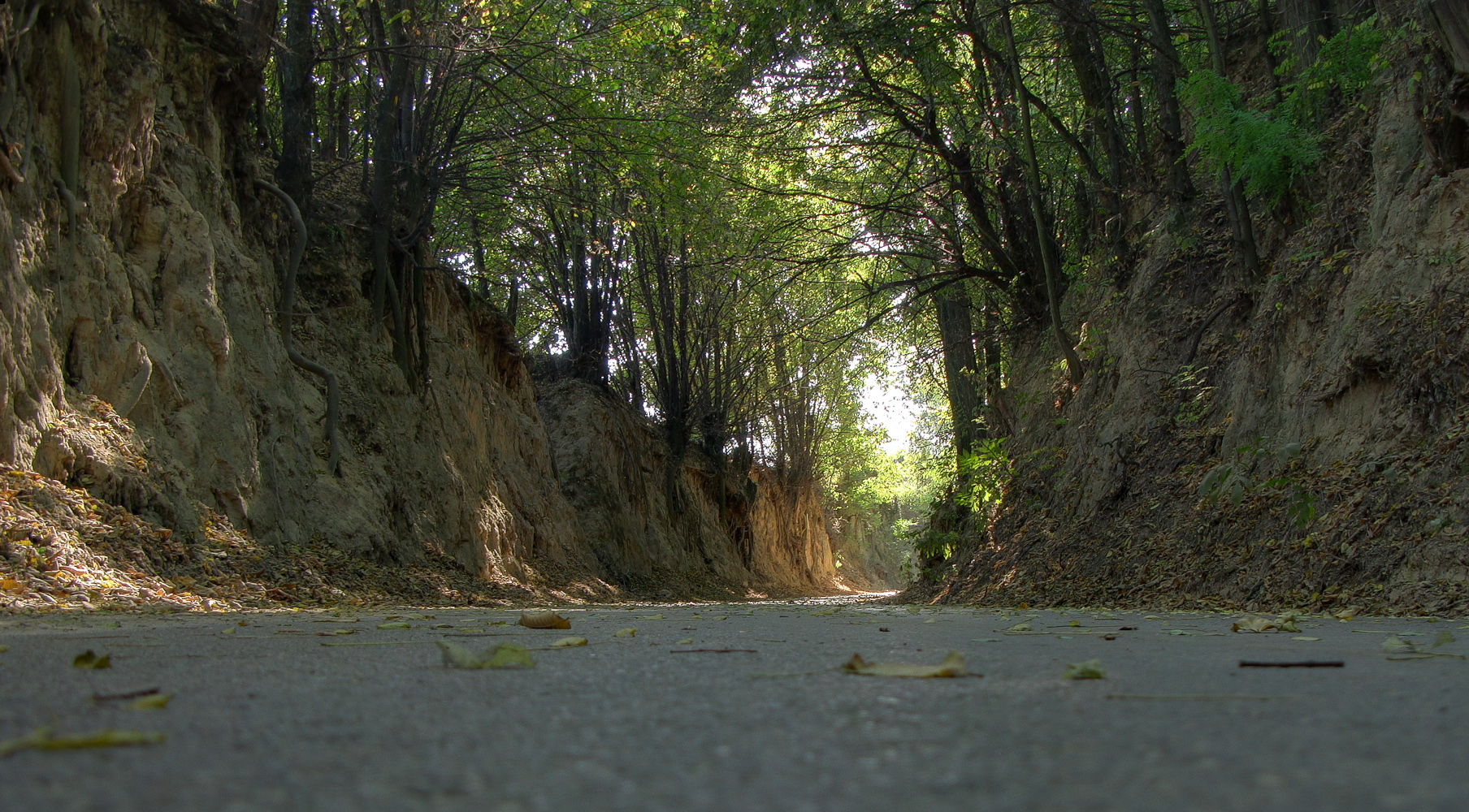
- Gully

- Location within Poland
- Coordinates: 50°38′13″N 21°36′30″E
- Country: Poland
- Voivodeship: Świętokrzyskie
- County: Sandomierz
- Gmina: Samborzec
- Population: 590

Gorzyczany [ɡɔʐɨˈt͡ʂanɨ] is a village in the administrative district of Gmina Samborzec, within Sandomierz County, Świętokrzyskie Voivodeship, in south-central Poland. It lies approximately 4 km (2 mi) west of Samborzec, 12 km (7 mi) south-west of Sandomierz, and 75 km (47 mi) east of the regional capital Kielce.
