= Milczany, Świętokrzyskie Voivodeship =

Milczany
- Village
- Location within Poland
- Coordinates: 50°41′10″N 21°41′57″E
- Country: Poland
- Voivodeship: Świętokrzyskie
- County: Sandomierz
- Gmina: Samborzec
- Population (2011): 456
- Time zone: UTC+1 (CET)
  - Summer (DST): UTC+2 (CEST)
- Postal code: 27-650
- Area code: +48 15
- Vehicle registration: TSA

Milczany [milˈt͡ʂanɨ] is a village in the administrative district of Gmina Samborzec, within Sandomierz County, Świętokrzyskie Voivodeship, in south-central Poland. It lies approximately 6 km (4 mi) north-east of Samborzec, 4 km (2 mi) west of Sandomierz, and 80 km (50 mi) east of the regional capital Kielce.

Milczany is located on the Lesser Polish Way, one of the Polish routes of the Way of St. James.
