= Złota, Sandomierz County =

Złota
- Village
- Location within Poland
- Coordinates: 50°39′31″N 21°40′46″E
- Country: Poland
- Voivodeship: Świętokrzyskie
- County: Sandomierz
- Gmina: Samborzec
- Population: 990

Złota [ˈzwɔta] is a village in the administrative district of Gmina Samborzec, within Sandomierz County, Świętokrzyskie Voivodeship, in south-central Poland. It lies approximately 2 km (1 mi) north-east of Samborzec, 6 km (4 mi) south-west of Sandomierz, and 79 km (49 mi) east of the regional capital Kielce.
