= Zajeziorze =

Zajeziorze may refer to the following places:

- Zajeziorze, Gmina Kikół in Kuyavian-Pomeranian Voivodeship (north-central Poland)
- Zajeziorze, Gmina Skępe in Kuyavian-Pomeranian Voivodeship (north-central Poland)
- Zajeziorze, Świętokrzyskie Voivodeship (south-central Poland)
- Zajeziorze, Subcarpathian Voivodeship (south-east Poland)
