= Jachimowice =

- Village
- Location within Poland
- Coordinates: 50°37′40″N 21°32′48″E
- Country: Poland
- Voivodeship: Świętokrzyskie
- County: Sandomierz
- Gmina: Samborzec

Jachimowice [jaximɔˈvit͡sɛ] is a village in the administrative district of Gmina Samborzec, within Sandomierz County, Świętokrzyskie Voivodeship, in south-central Poland. It lies approximately 9 km (6 mi) west of Samborzec, 16 km (10 mi) south-west of Sandomierz, and 72 km (45 mi) south-east of the regional capital Kielce.
