= Łojowice =

Łojowice may refer to the following places in Poland:

- Łojowice, Lower Silesian Voivodeship (south-west Poland)
- Łojowice, Świętokrzyskie Voivodeship (south-central Poland)
