= Karsy, Lesser Poland Voivodeship =

Karsy
- Village
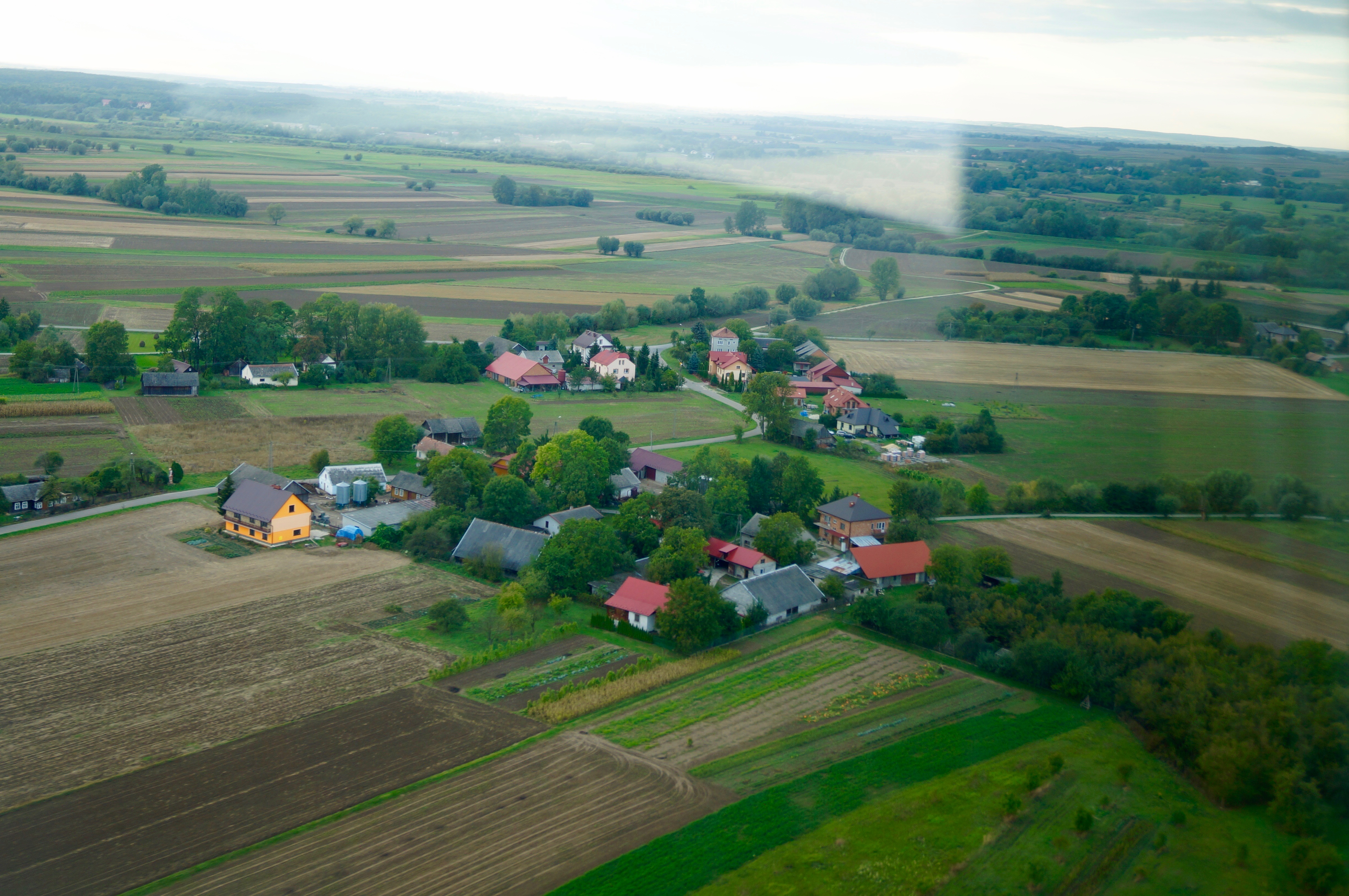

- Location within Poland
- Coordinates: 50°15′49″N 20°46′31″E
- Country: Poland
- Voivodeship: Lesser Poland
- County: Dąbrowa
- Gmina: Gręboszów
- Boroughs: Bugaj
- Area: 24,174 ha (59,740 acres)
- Elevation: 175 m (574 ft)
- Population: 197
- Time zone: CEST
- Postal code: 33-260
- Area code: 14
- Vehicle registration: KDA
- Website: http://greboszow.pl/solectwa/karsy.html

Karsy [ˈkarsɨ] is a village in the administrative district of Gmina Gręboszów, within Dąbrowa County, Lesser Poland Voivodeship, in southern Poland. It lies on the Vistula River, a few kilometers north of the commune's capital, Gręboszów. The area of Karsy is 241.74 ha.

The village has tourist attractions, such as the proximity of the Vistula River, breeding places of water birds, fishing places, and roads for cycling (the Vistula Cycling Route and the Amber Trail Greenways run through Karsy). There are several historic statues and crosses in the village (including the statue of Sorrowful Jesus from 1860).

In Karsy there is Sports Team "Strażak", founded in 1995, whose matches take place on the local football pitch.

Program I of the Polish Radio broadcasts daily the water level on the Vistula in Karsy, it is also available on the website of IMGW "Pogodynka”.

Bugaj is an integral part of the village.
