= Chobrzany =

- Village
- Location within Poland
- Coordinates: 50°38′40″N 21°34′26″E
- Country: Poland
- Voivodeship: Świętokrzyskie
- County: Sandomierz
- Gmina: Samborzec

Chobrzany [xɔˈbʐanɨ] is a village in the administrative district of Gmina Samborzec, within Sandomierz County, Świętokrzyskie Voivodeship, in south-central Poland. It lies approximately 6 km (4 mi) west of Samborzec, 14 km (9 mi) west of Sandomierz, and 73 km (45 mi) east of the regional capital Kielce.
