= Skotniki, Świętokrzyskie Voivodeship =

Skotniki
- Village
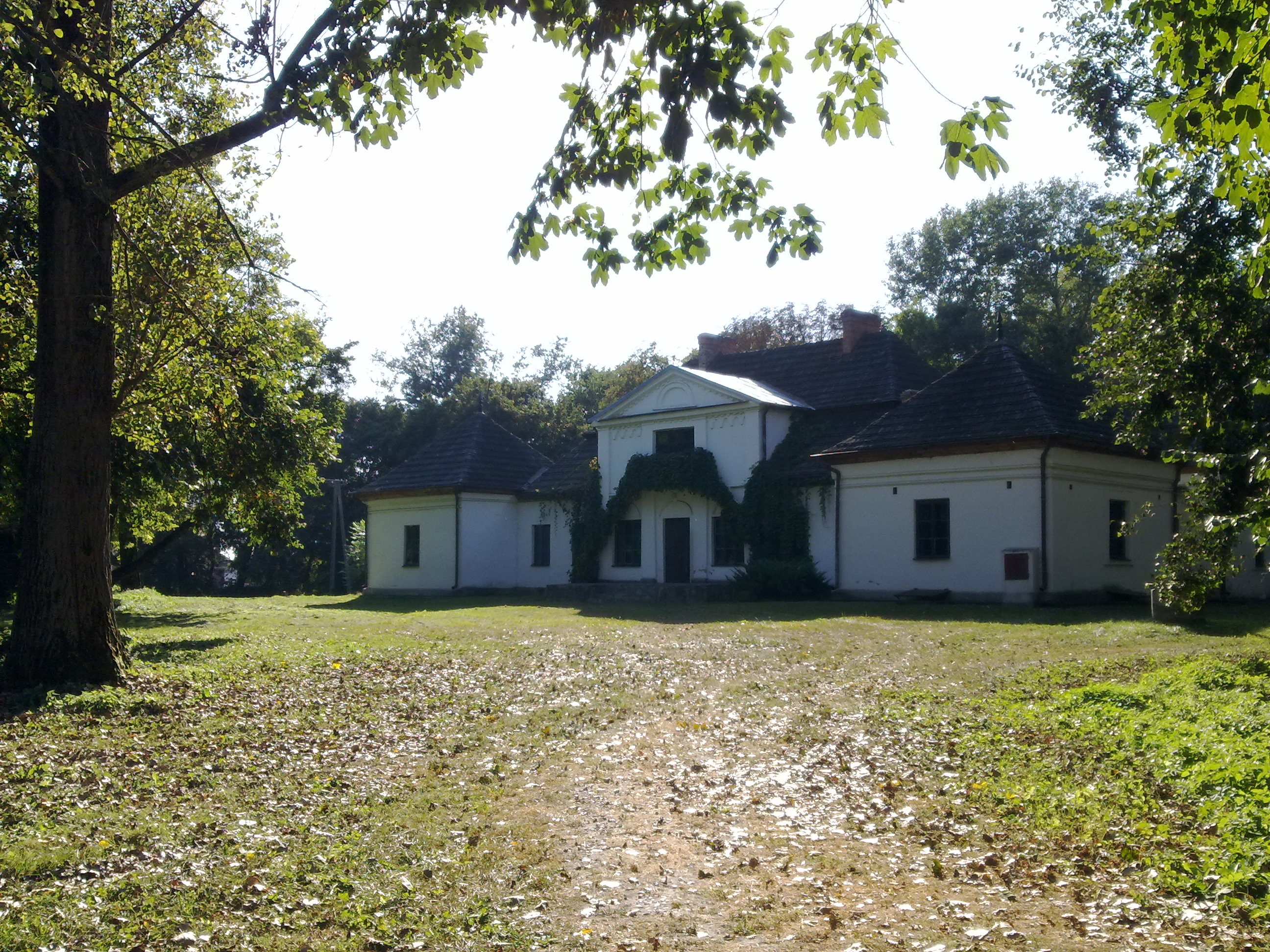
- Manor house

- Location within Poland
- Coordinates: 50°37′8″N 21°38′28″E
- Country: Poland
- Voivodeship: Świętokrzyskie
- County: Sandomierz
- Gmina: Samborzec
- Population: 260

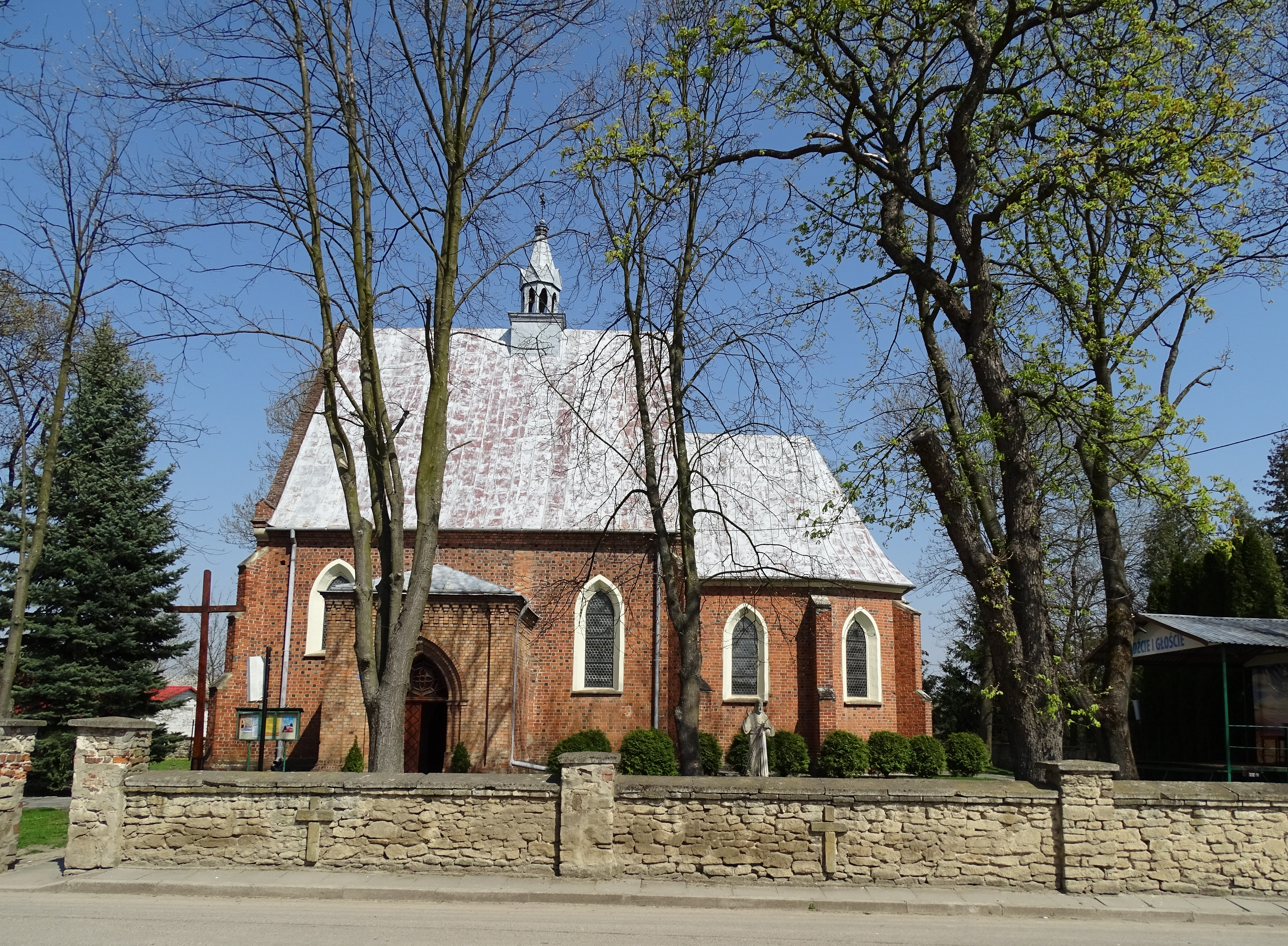
Parish church of Saint John the Baptist from the 14th century.

Skotniki [skɔtˈniki] is a village in the administrative district of Gmina Samborzec, within Sandomierz County, Świętokrzyskie Voivodeship, in south-central Poland. It lies approximately 4 km (2 mi) south of Samborzec, 11 km (7 mi) south-west of Sandomierz, and 78 km (48 mi) east of the regional capital Kielce.
