= Bogoria Skotnicka =

- Village
- Location within Poland
- Coordinates: 50°37′N 21°40′E
- Country: Poland
- Voivodeship: Świętokrzyskie
- County: Sandomierz
- Gmina: Samborzec

Bogoria Skotnicka [bɔˈɡɔrja skɔtˈnit͡ska] is a village in the administrative district of Gmina Samborzec, within Sandomierz County, Świętokrzyskie Voivodeship, in south-central Poland. It lies approximately 4 km (2 mi) south of Samborzec, 10 km (6 mi) south-west of Sandomierz, and 80 km (50 mi) east of the regional capital Kielce.
