= Polanów, Świętokrzyskie Voivodeship =

Polanów
- Village
- Location within Poland
- Coordinates: 50°39′43″N 21°39′21″E
- Country: Poland
- Voivodeship: Świętokrzyskie
- County: Sandomierz
- Gmina: Samborzec
- Population (2011): 334
- Time zone: UTC+1 (CET)
  - Summer (DST): UTC+2 (CEST)
- Postal code: 27-650
- Area code: +48 15
- Vehicle registration: TSA

Polanów [pɔˈlanuf] is a village in the administrative district of Gmina Samborzec, within Sandomierz County, Świętokrzyskie Voivodeship, in south-central Poland. It lies approximately 2 km (1 mi) north of Samborzec, 8 km (5 mi) west of Sandomierz, and 78 km (48 mi) east of the regional capital Kielce.

The village dates back to the Middle Ages, it was first mentioned in old Polish chronicles in the 13th century.
