= Krzeczkowice =

- Village
- Location within Poland
- Coordinates: 50°39′N 21°32′E
- Country: Poland
- Voivodeship: Świętokrzyskie
- County: Sandomierz
- Gmina: Samborzec

Krzeczkowice [kʂɛt͡ʂkɔˈvit͡sɛ] is a village in the administrative district of Gmina Samborzec, within Sandomierz County, Świętokrzyskie Voivodeship, in south-central Poland. It lies approximately 9 km (6 mi) west of Samborzec, 16 km (10 mi) west of Sandomierz, and 70 km (43 mi) east of the regional capital Kielce.
