= Gmina Samborzec =

Gmina Samborzec Samborzec Commune
- Gmina
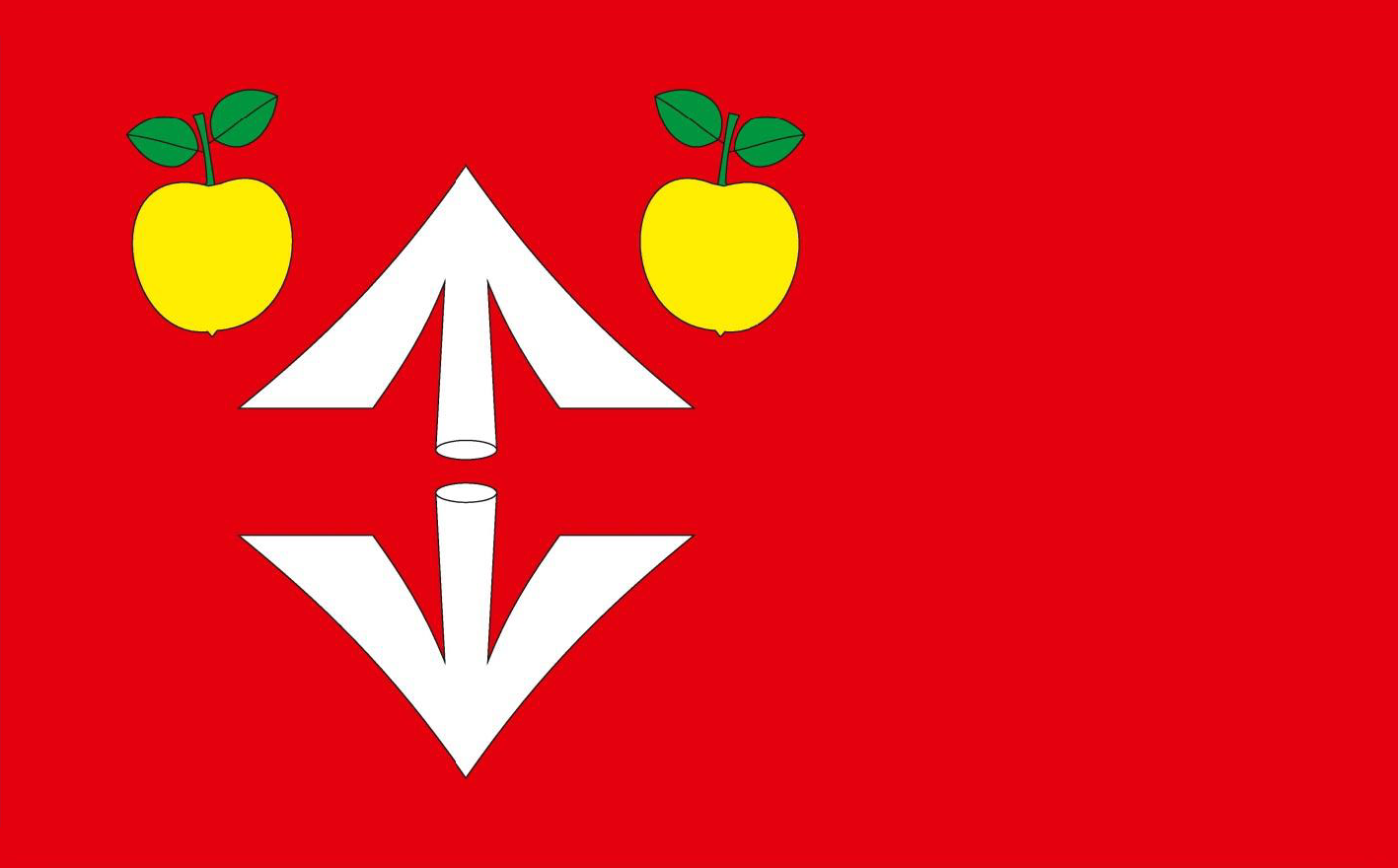
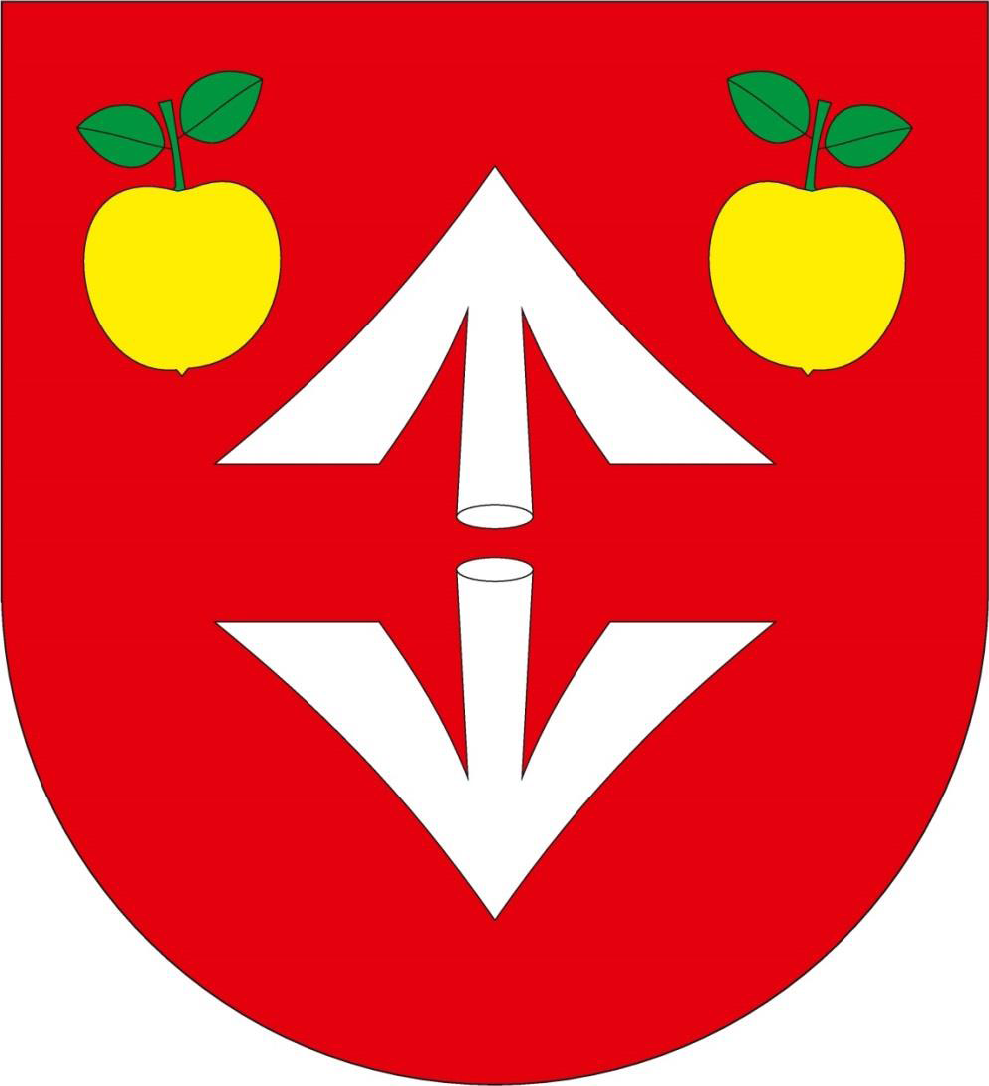
- Flag Coat of arms

- Location within Poland
- Coordinates (Samborzec): 50°38′58″N 21°39′25″E
- Country: Poland
- Voivodeship: Świętokrzyskie
- County: Sandomierz
- Seat: Samborzec

Area
  - Total: 85.37 km^{2} (32.96 sq mi)

Population (2013)
  - Total: 8,657
  - Density: 101.4/km^{2} (262.6/sq mi)
- Website: http://www.samborzec.eu

Gmina Samborzec is a rural gmina (administrative district) in Sandomierz County, Świętokrzyskie Voivodeship, in south-central Poland. Its seat is the village of Samborzec, which lies approximately 8 kilometres (5 mi) south-west of Sandomierz and 78 km (48 mi) east of the regional capital Kielce.

The gmina covers an area of 85.37 square kilometres (33.0 sq mi), and as of 2006 its total population is 9,007 (8,657 in 2013).

== Villages ==
Gmina Samborzec contains the villages and settlements of Andruszkowice, Bogoria Skotnicka, Bystrojowice, Chobrzany, Faliszowice, Gorzyczany, Jachimowice, Janowice, Kobierniki, Koćmierzów, Krzeczkowice, Łojowice, Milczany, Ostrołęka, Polanów, Ryłowice, Samborzec, Skotniki, Śmiechowice, Strączków, Strochcice, Szewce, Wielogóra, Zajeziorze, Zawierzbie, Zawisełcze and Złota.

== Neighbouring gminas ==
Gmina Samborzec is bordered by the towns of Sandomierz and Tarnobrzeg, and by the gminas of Klimontów, Koprzywnica and Obrazów.
