= Wola Gręboszowska =

- Village
- Location within Poland
- Coordinates: 50°15′N 20°48′E
- Country: Poland
- Voivodeship: Lesser Poland
- County: Dąbrowa
- Gmina: Gręboszów

Wola Gręboszowska [ˈvɔla ɡrɛmbɔˈʂɔfska] is a village in the administrative district of Gmina Gręboszów, within Dąbrowa County, Lesser Poland Voivodeship, in southern Poland.
