= Borusowa =

- Village
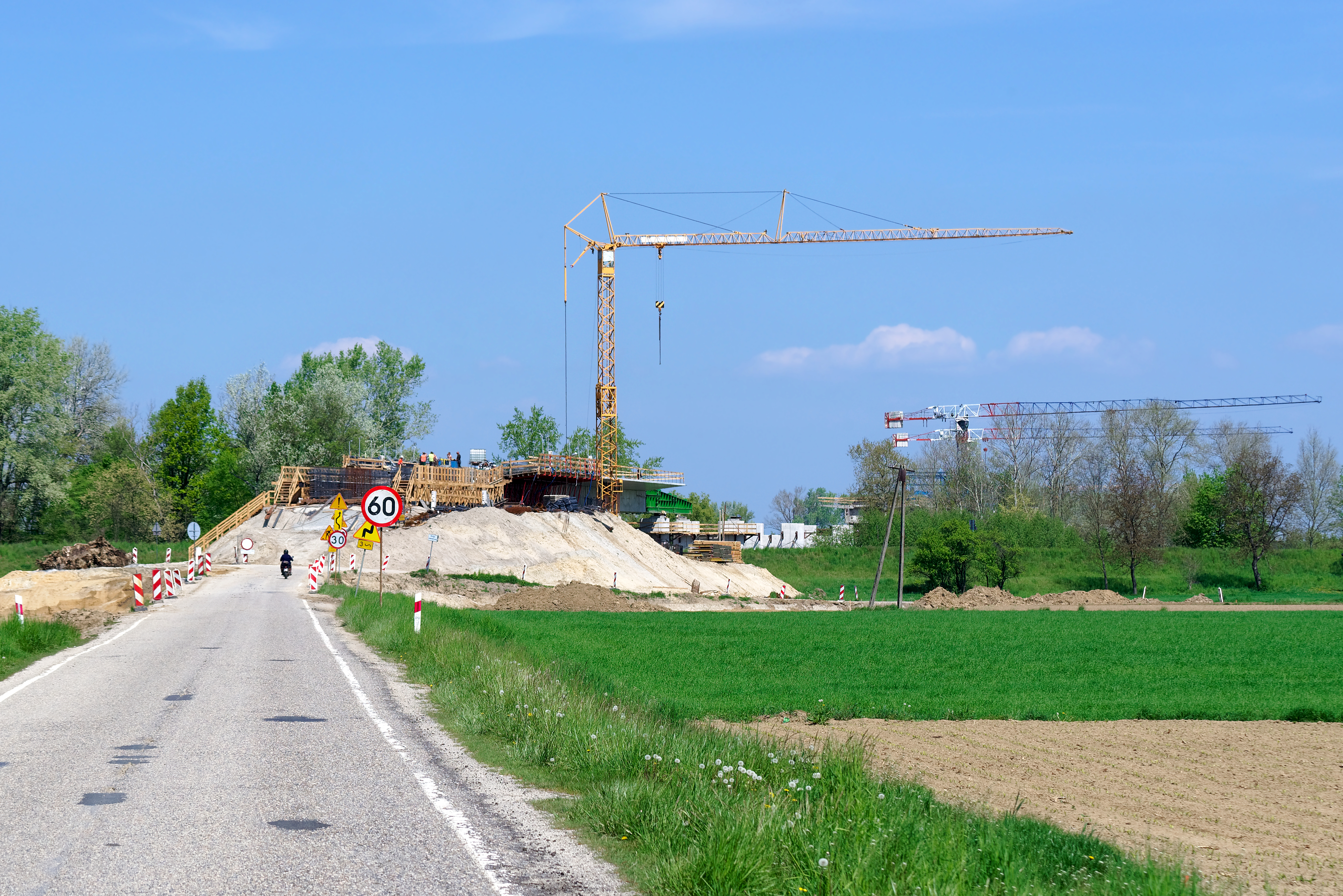
- Cross from 1761 at a village crossroads.

- Location within Poland
- Coordinates: 50°17′N 20°48′E
- Country: Poland
- Voivodeship: Lesser Poland
- County: Dąbrowa
- Gmina: Gręboszów

Borusowa [bɔruˈsɔva] is a village in the administrative district of Gmina Gręboszów, within Dąbrowa County, Lesser Poland Voivodeship, in southern Poland.

The Borusowa Ferry, a cable ferry, crosses the River Vistula between Borusowa and Nowy Korczyn.
