= Biskupice, Dąbrowa County =

Biskupice
- Village
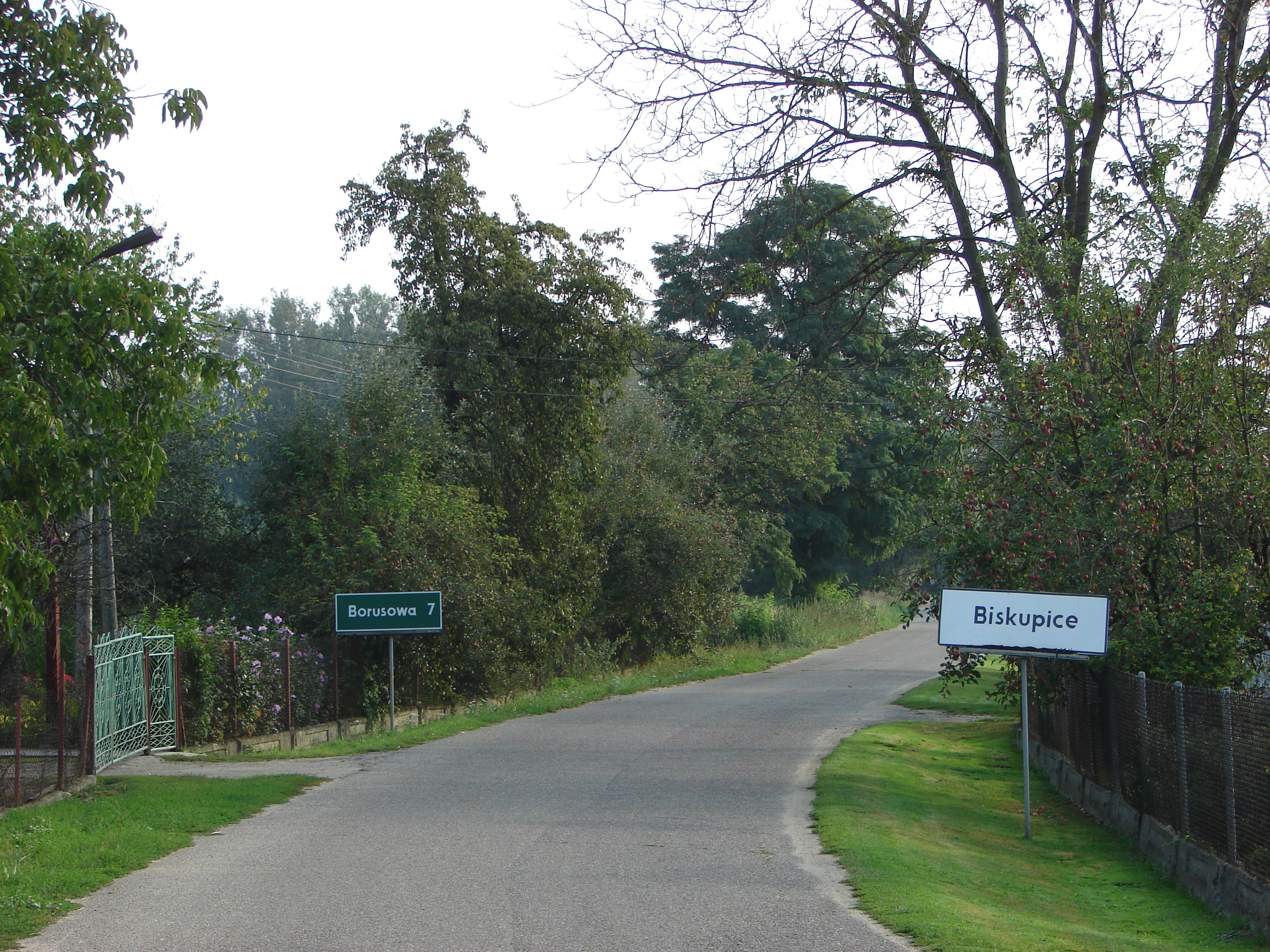

- Location within Poland
- Coordinates: 50°15′N 20°46′E
- Country: Poland
- Voivodeship: Lesser Poland
- County: Dąbrowa
- Gmina: Gręboszów

Biskupice [biskuˈpit͡sɛ] is a village in the administrative district of Gmina Gręboszów, within Dąbrowa County, Lesser Poland Voivodeship, in southern Poland.
