= Ostrołęka, Świętokrzyskie Voivodeship =

Ostrołęka
- Village
- Location within Poland
- Coordinates: 50°37′39″N 21°41′47″E
- Country: Poland
- Voivodeship: Świętokrzyskie
- County: Sandomierz
- Gmina: Samborzec
- Population (2011): 252
- Time zone: UTC+1 (CET)
  - Summer (DST): UTC+2 (CEST)
- Postal code: 27-650
- Area code: +48 15
- Vehicle registration: TSA

Ostrołęka [ɔstrɔˈwɛŋka] is a village in the administrative district of Gmina Samborzec, within Sandomierz County, Świętokrzyskie Voivodeship, in south-central Poland. It lies approximately 4 km (2 mi) south-east of Samborzec, 8 km (5 mi) south-west of Sandomierz, and 82 km (51 mi) east of the regional capital Kielce.
