= Hubenice =

- Village
- Location within Poland
- Coordinates: 50°16′N 20°50′E
- Country: Poland
- Voivodeship: Lesser Poland
- County: Dąbrowa
- Gmina: Gręboszów

Hubenice [xubɛˈnit͡sɛ] is a village in the administrative district of Gmina Gręboszów, within Dąbrowa County, Lesser Poland Voivodeship, in southern Poland.
