= Zawierzbie, Świętokrzyskie Voivodeship =

Zawierzbie
- Village
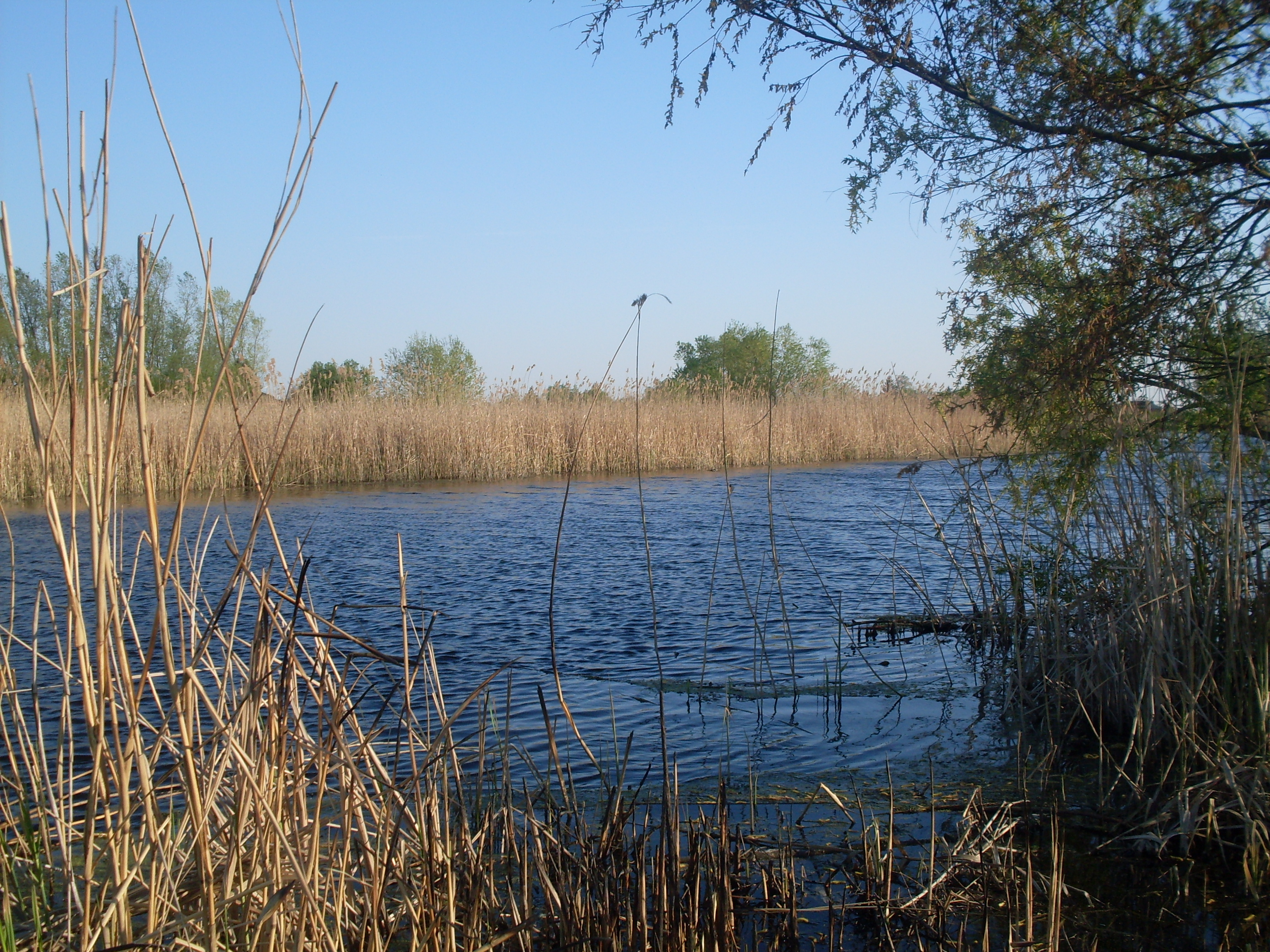
- Lake

- Location within Poland
- Coordinates: 50°38′39″N 21°42′29″E
- Country: Poland
- Voivodeship: Świętokrzyskie
- County: Sandomierz
- Gmina: Samborzec

Zawierzbie [zaˈvjɛʐbjɛ] is a village in the administrative district of Gmina Samborzec, within Sandomierz County, Świętokrzyskie Voivodeship, in south-central Poland. It lies approximately 4 km (2 mi) east of Samborzec, 6 km (4 mi) south-west of Sandomierz, and 82 km (51 mi) east of the regional capital Kielce.
