= Śmiechowice, Świętokrzyskie Voivodeship =

Śmiechowice
- Village
- Location within Poland
- Coordinates: 50°39′36″N 21°36′58″E
- Country: Poland
- Voivodeship: Świętokrzyskie
- County: Sandomierz
- Gmina: Samborzec

Śmiechowice [ɕmjɛxɔˈvit͡sɛ] is a village in the administrative district of Gmina Samborzec, within Sandomierz County, Świętokrzyskie Voivodeship, in south-central Poland. It lies approximately 4 km (2 mi) west of Samborzec, 10 km (6 mi) west of Sandomierz, and 75 km (47 mi) east of the regional capital Kielce.
