= Łojowice, Świętokrzyskie Voivodeship =

Łojowice
- Village
- Location within Poland
- Coordinates: 50°40′21″N 21°40′0″E
- Country: Poland
- Voivodeship: Świętokrzyskie
- County: Sandomierz
- Gmina: Samborzec
- Population: 230

Łojowice [wɔjɔˈvit͡sɛ] is a village in the administrative district of Gmina Samborzec, within Sandomierz County, Świętokrzyskie Voivodeship, in south-central Poland. It lies approximately 3 km (2 mi) north of Samborzec, 6 km (4 mi) west of Sandomierz, and 78 km (48 mi) east of the regional capital Kielce.
