= Ujście Jezuickie =

- Village
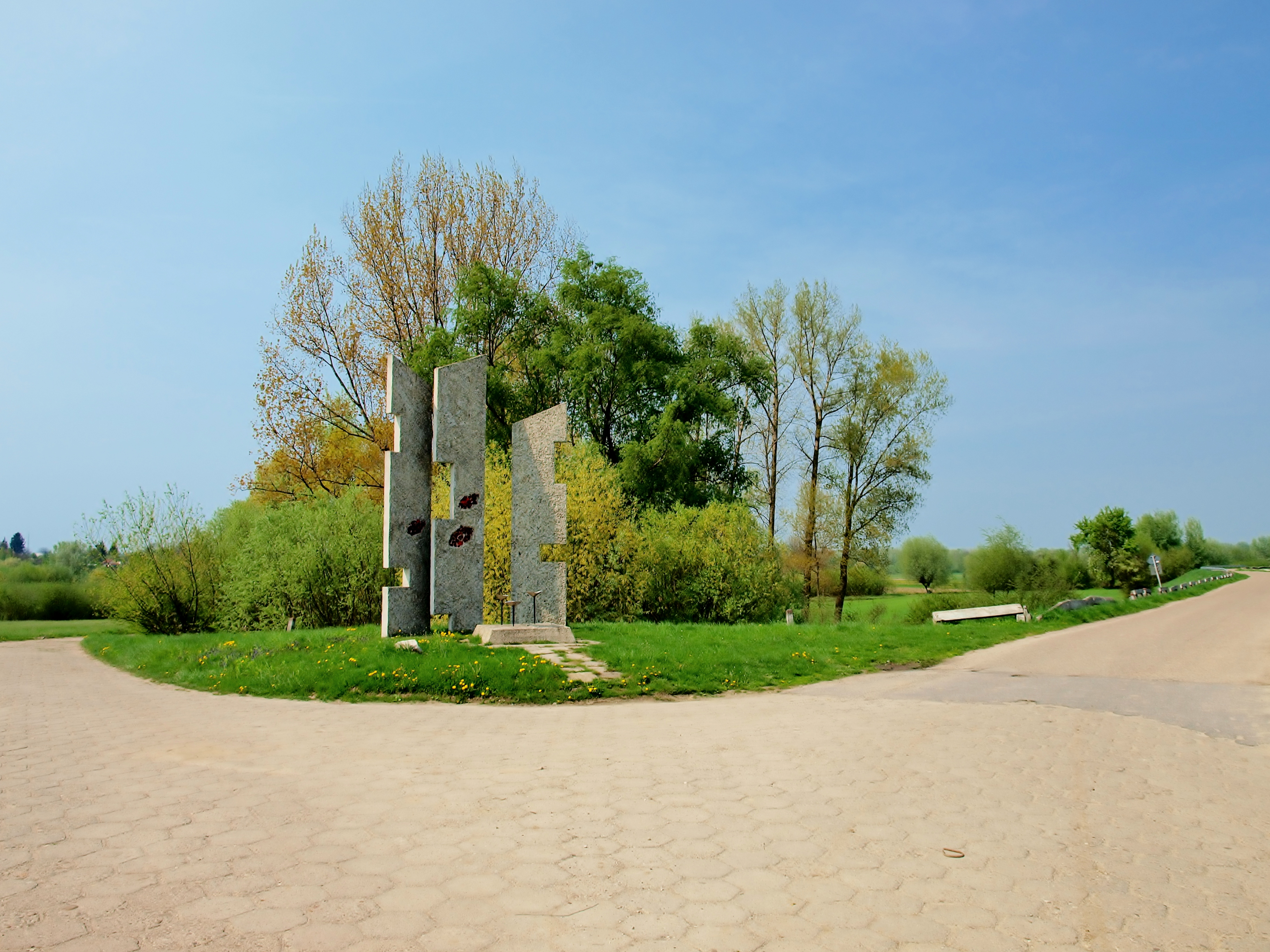
- World War II monument

- Location within Poland
- Coordinates: 50°15′N 20°45′E
- Country: Poland
- Voivodeship: Lesser Poland
- County: Dąbrowa
- Gmina: Gręboszów

Ujście Jezuickie [ˈui̯ɕt͡ɕɛ jɛzuˈit͡skʲɛ] is a village in the administrative district of Gmina Gręboszów, within Dąbrowa County, Lesser Poland Voivodeship, in southern Poland.
