= Zapasternicze =

Zapasternicze, Poland
- Village
- Location within Poland
- Coordinates: 50°13′55″N 20°50′14″E
- Country: Poland
- Voivodeship: Lesser Poland
- County: Dąbrowa
- Gmina: Gręboszów
- Population: 110

Zapasternicze [zapastɛrˈnit͡ʂɛ] is a village in the administrative district of Gmina Gręboszów, within Dąbrowa County, Lesser Poland Voivodeship, in southern Poland.
