= Zajeziorze, Świętokrzyskie Voivodeship =

Zajeziorze
- Village
- Location within Poland
- Coordinates: 50°38′N 21°40′E
- Country: Poland
- Voivodeship: Świętokrzyskie
- County: Sandomierz
- Gmina: Samborzec
- Population: 556

Zajeziorze [zajɛˈʑɔʐɛ] is a village in the administrative district of Gmina Samborzec, within Sandomierz County, Świętokrzyskie Voivodeship, in south-central Poland. It lies approximately 2 km (1 mi) south of Samborzec, 9 km (6 mi) south-west of Sandomierz, and 79 km (49 mi) east of the regional capital Kielce.
