= Gręboszów, Lesser Poland Voivodeship =

Gręboszów
- Village
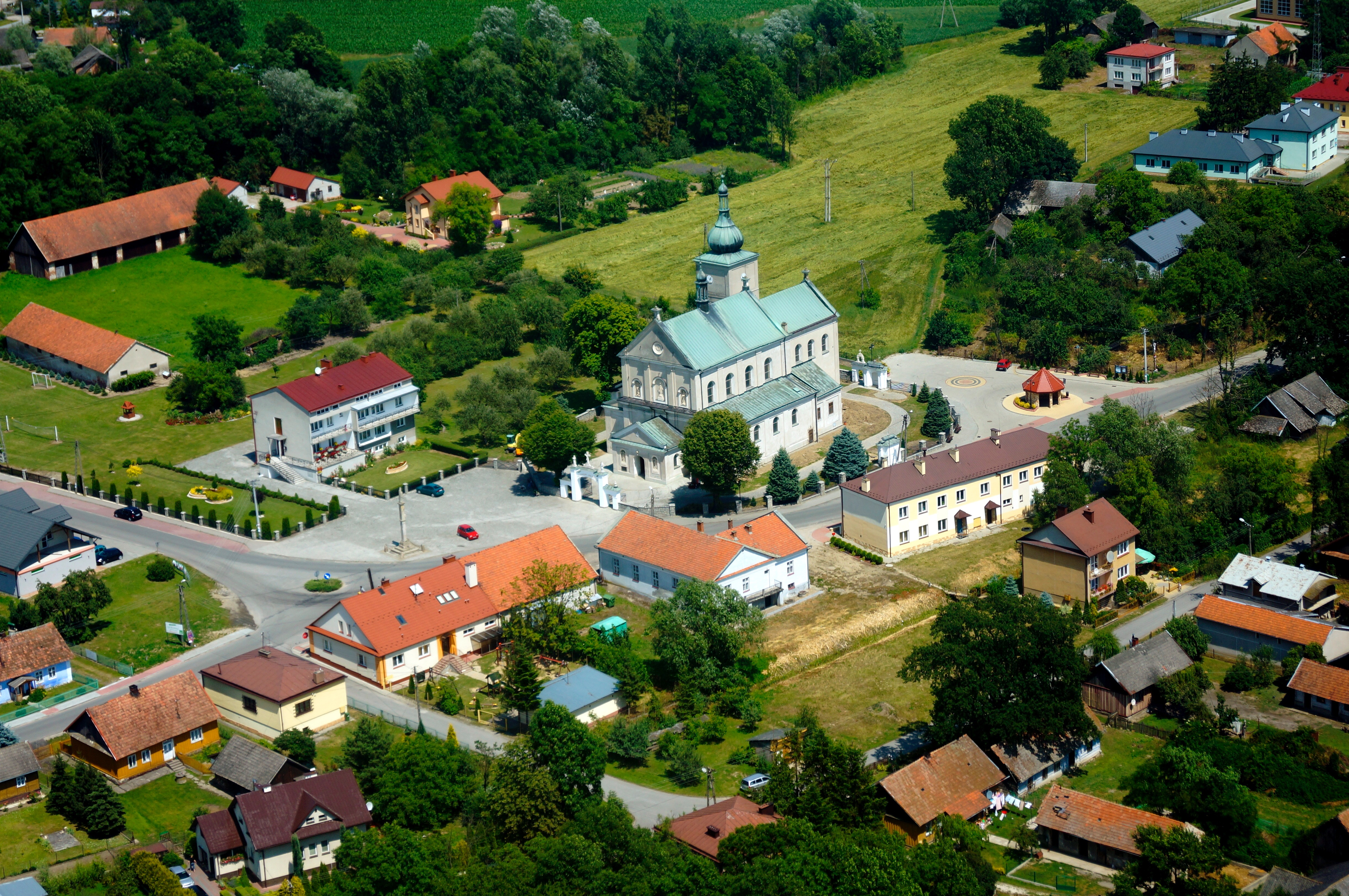
- Town view and parish church built in 1650.

- Location within Poland
- Coordinates: 50°14′40″N 20°46′32″E
- Country: Poland
- Voivodeship: Lesser Poland
- County: Dąbrowa
- Gmina: Gręboszów
- Website: www.greboszow.okay.pl

Gręboszów [ɡrɛmˈbɔʂuf] is a village in Dąbrowa County, Lesser Poland Voivodeship, in southern Poland. It is the seat of the gmina (administrative district) called Gmina Gręboszów.
