= Żelichów =

Żelichów may refer to the following places:

- Żelichów, Lesser Poland Voivodeship (south Poland)
- Żelichów, Łódź Voivodeship (central Poland)
- Żelichów, West Pomeranian Voivodeship (north-west Poland)
