= Gmina Gręboszów =

Gmina Gręboszów Gręboszów Commune
- Gmina
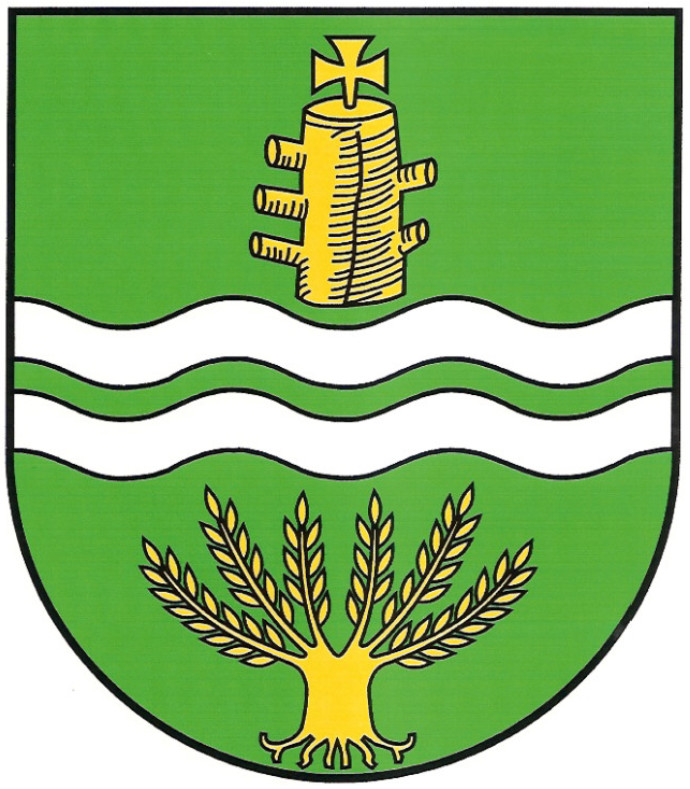
- Coat of arms
- Interactive map of Gmina Gręboszów
- Coordinates (Gręboszów): 50°14′40″N 20°46′32″E
- Country: Poland
- Voivodeship: Lesser Poland
- County: Dąbrowa
- Seat: Gręboszów

Area
  - Total: 48.63 km^{2} (18.78 sq mi)

Population (2006)
  - Total: 3,599
  - Density: 74.01/km^{2} (191.7/sq mi)
- Website: http://www.greboszow.intarnet.pl/

Gmina Gręboszów is a rural gmina (administrative district) in Dąbrowa County, Lesser Poland Voivodeship, in southern Poland. Its seat is the village of Gręboszów, which lies approximately 18 kilometres (11 mi) north-west of Dąbrowa Tarnowska and 64 km (40 mi) east of the regional capital Kraków.

The gmina covers an area of 48.63 square kilometres (18.8 sq mi), and as of 2006 its total population is 3,599.

== Villages ==
Gmina Gręboszów contains the villages and settlements of Bieniaszowice, Biskupice, Borusowa, Gręboszów, Hubenice, Karsy, Kozłów, Lubiczko, Okręg, Ujście Jezuickie, Wola Gręboszowska, Wola Żelichowska, Zapasternicze, Zawierzbie and Żelichów.

== Neighbouring gminas ==
Gmina Gręboszów is bordered by the gminas of Bolesław, Nowy Korczyn, Olesno, Opatowiec, Wietrzychowice and Żabno.
