= Żelichów, Lesser Poland Voivodeship =

Żelichów
- Village
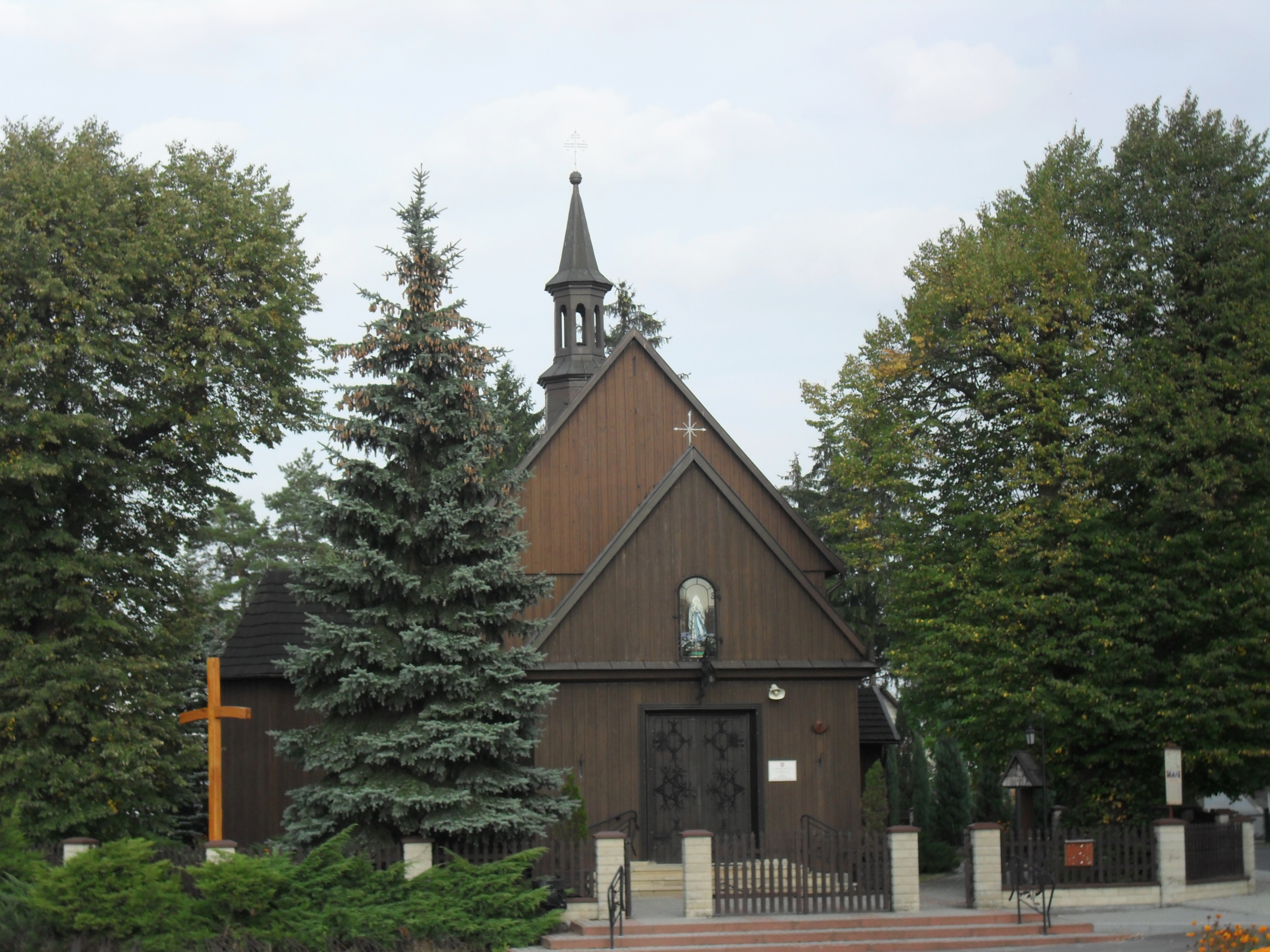
- Saint Sigismund church in Żelichów

- Location within Poland
- Coordinates: 50°13′35″N 20°49′4″E
- Country: Poland
- Voivodeship: Lesser Poland
- County: Dąbrowa
- Gmina: Gręboszów

Żelichów [ʐɛˈlixuf] is a village in the administrative district of Gmina Gręboszów, within Dąbrowa County, Lesser Poland Voivodeship, in southern Poland.
