= Zawierzbie, Lesser Poland Voivodeship =

Zawierzbie
- Village
- Location within Poland
- Coordinates: 50°05′09″N 20°45′59″E
- Country: Poland
- Voivodeship: Lesser Poland
- County: Dąbrowa
- Gmina: Gręboszów

Zawierzbie [zaˈvjɛʐbjɛ] is a village in the administrative district of Gmina Gręboszów, within Dąbrowa County, Lesser Poland Voivodeship, in southern Poland.
