= Vistula Cycle Route =

Planned long-distance cycle route along the Vistula in Poland

Wiślana Trasa Rowerowa
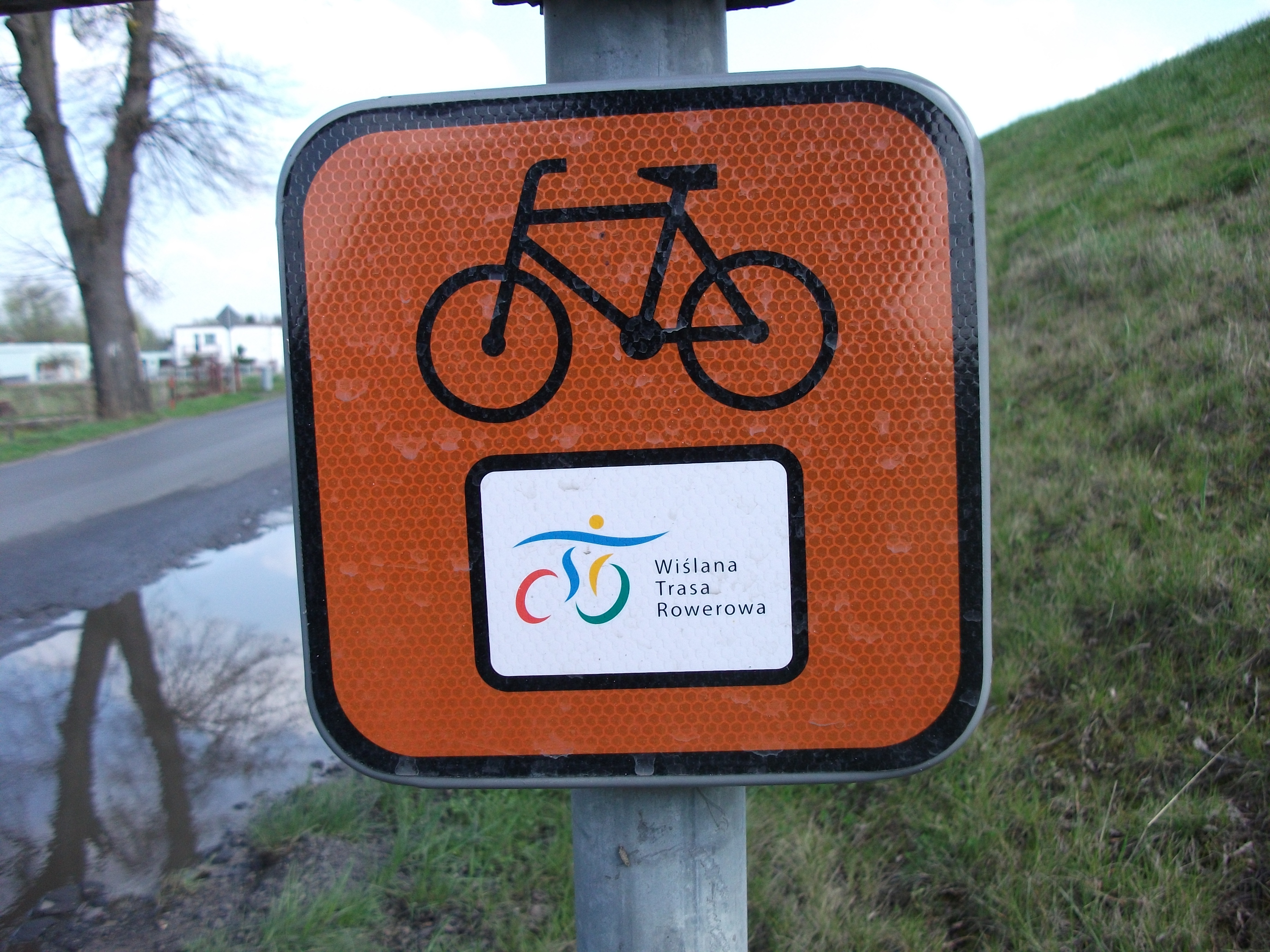
- Waymark of the Wiślana Trasa Rowerowa
- Length: 1,200 km (750 mi) planned
- Location: Poland
- Trailheads: Wisła Uzdrowisko railway station – Baltic Sea / Sobieszewo Island (planned)
- Use: Cycling
- Season: Year-round
- Waymark: R4 signs and WTR logo; in Pomerania also EV9/WTR
- Surface: Asphalt cycleways, local roads, flood embankments, gravel and unpaved sections

Trail map
- WTR in the Silesian Voivodeship

Wiślana Trasa Rowerowa (WTR; English: Vistula Cycle Route or Vistula Cycling Route) is a partly completed long-distance cycle route in Poland, planned to run along the Vistula, the country's longest river. The route is intended to connect the Silesian Beskids and the upper Vistula valley with the Baltic Sea, with a planned length of about 1,200 km (750 mi).

The route passes through or is planned to pass through the Silesian Voivodeship, Lesser Poland Voivodeship, Świętokrzyskie Voivodeship, Podkarpackie Voivodeship, Lublin Voivodeship, Masovian Voivodeship, Kuyavian-Pomeranian Voivodeship and Pomeranian Voivodeship. Its state of completion differs substantially between regions. Marked or usable sections exist in Silesia, Lesser Poland, Kuyavia-Pomerania and Pomerania, while parts of the middle Vistula corridor remain at the planning, concept or design stage.

The route is intended to use roads and paths separated from motor traffic where possible, including the crests of flood embankments. In other places it uses local roads with low traffic, existing cycleways, gravel roads and unpaved rural or forest tracks.

== History ==
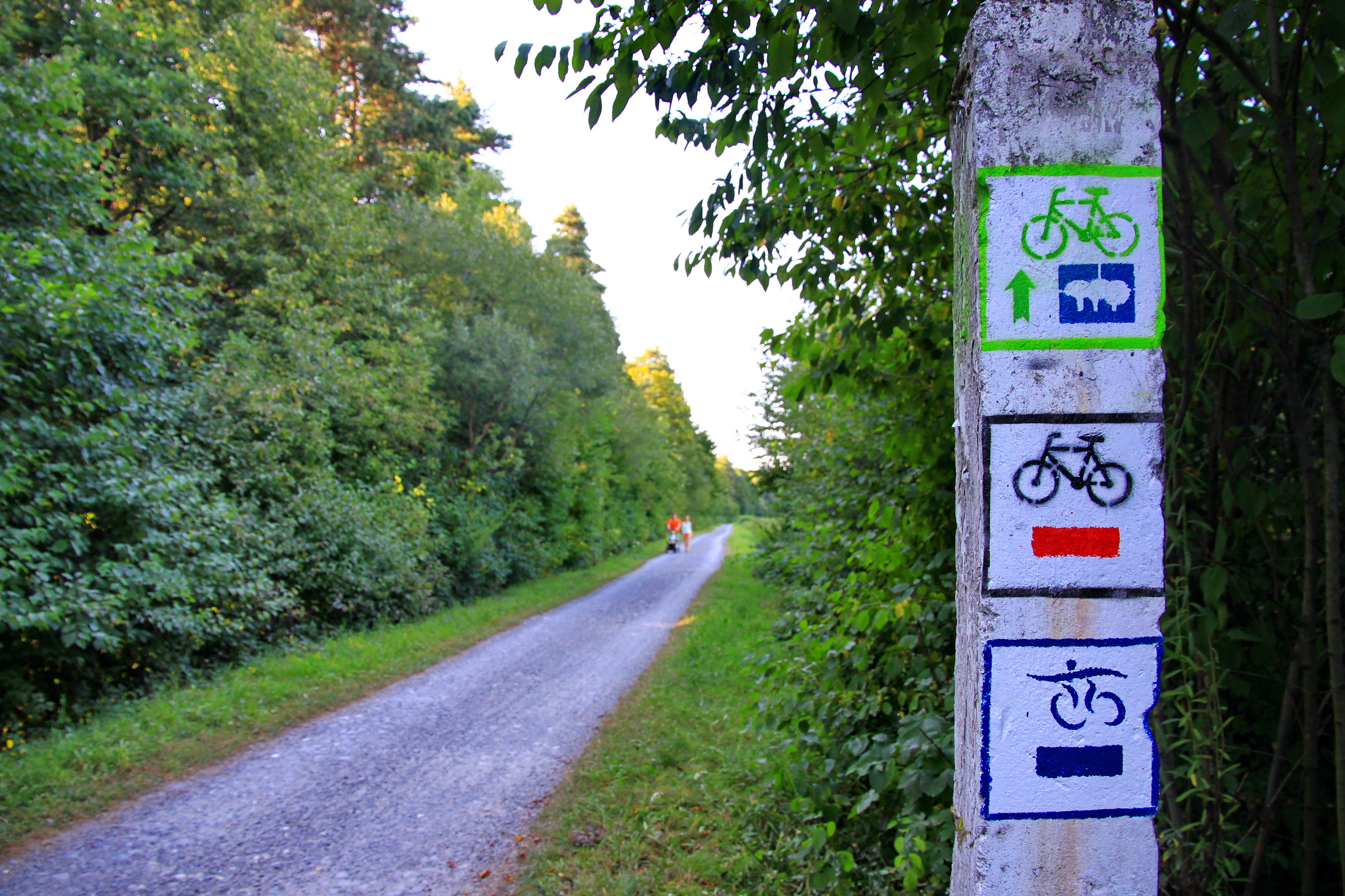
WTR in Ustroń-Nierodzim

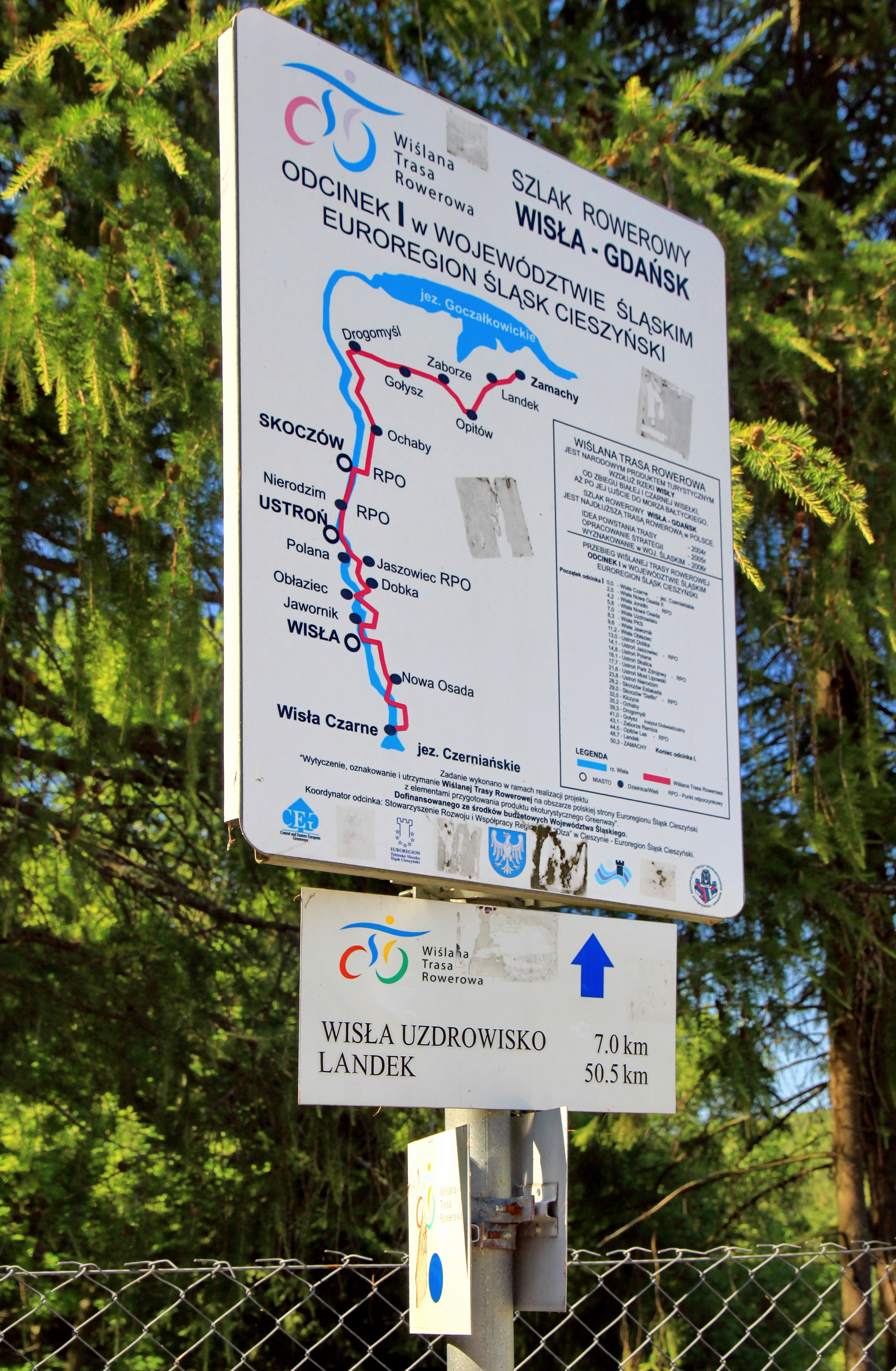
Beginning of the route near Lake Czerniańskie in Wisła-Czarne

The idea of creating a cycle route along the Vistula appeared around 1995. The project was initiated by Polish politician Grażyna Staniszewska.

In 2005, at the request of the Silesian Voivodeship, a tourism audit, product development strategy and visual identity catalogue for WTR were prepared. In April 2006, the Silesian regional government and the municipalities through which the route was to pass signed an agreement on joint construction of the Silesian section. The first Silesian section was completed in spring 2007.

On 20 May 2009 a letter of intent was signed for the national tourism product under the name Wiślana Trasa Rowerowa Beskidy – Morze Bałtyckie. Signatories included representatives of the Polish parliament, government, the European Commission, the Polish Tourist Organisation and local government organisations.

On 10 May 2014 the Kuyavian-Pomeranian section was officially opened. It consisted of 238 km (148 mi) on the left bank and 212 km (132 mi) on the right bank of the Vistula. The route was marked by the Society of Friends of the Lower Vistula on behalf of the Marshal's Office in Toruń, with funding from the European Regional Development Fund and the regional budget.

In June 2014 Polish law was amended to allow cycle routes to be designated along flood embankments and to remove penalties for cycling on such embankments.

In 2015 and 2016 major contracts were signed for the construction of the Lesser Poland section, including the Drwinia–Szczucin and Brzeszcze–Skawina sections. Most works were completed in 2016, apart from some later sections and structures.

In 2017 work began on the Pomeranian part of WTR within the Pomorskie Trasy Rowerowe programme, which includes sections of the EuroVelo 9 route and links to railway stations and tourist destinations. In 2018 the Silesian section was corrected and its signage renewed. In October 2021 the WTR section on Sobieszewo Island in Gdańsk was completed.

In 2024 the Road Authority of the Lublin Voivodeship prepared documentation for the future Lublin section of WTR. The commission was divided into four tasks covering areas of the municipalities of Annopol and Józefów nad Wisłą, Łaziska and Wilków, Kazimierz Dolny and Puławy, and Dęblin and Stężyca.

In 2025 contracts were signed for new WTR sections in the municipalities of Wietrzychowice and Wieliczka in Lesser Poland. In April 2026 regional funding was awarded for two further WTR tasks: about 1.7 km (1.1 mi) in Wietrzychowice on the flood embankments of the Dunajec and about 6.25 km (3.88 mi) in Wieliczka on the embankments of the Vistula, Serafa and Podłężanka, including two cycle bridges.

In October 2025 the Pomeranian Voivodeship began the second stage of the Pomorskie Trasy Rowerowe programme, including the completion of missing sections of EuroVelo 9 / WTR. In February 2026 more than 30 km (19 mi) of new or upgraded routes were announced, including sections in the municipalities of Suchy Dąb, Stegna, Miłoradz and Lichnowy. In May 2026 further contracts were announced for Pomerania, including 7.6 km (4.7 mi) of sections in the municipality of Miłoradz and a route on the Vistula embankment in the municipality of Stegna.

== Route and status ==
WTR in the Silesian Voivodeship

The route is not implemented as one single centrally managed investment. In southern and northern Poland it has functioning marked sections, while in the middle part of the Vistula corridor several sections remain planned or under design.

=== Silesian Voivodeship ===
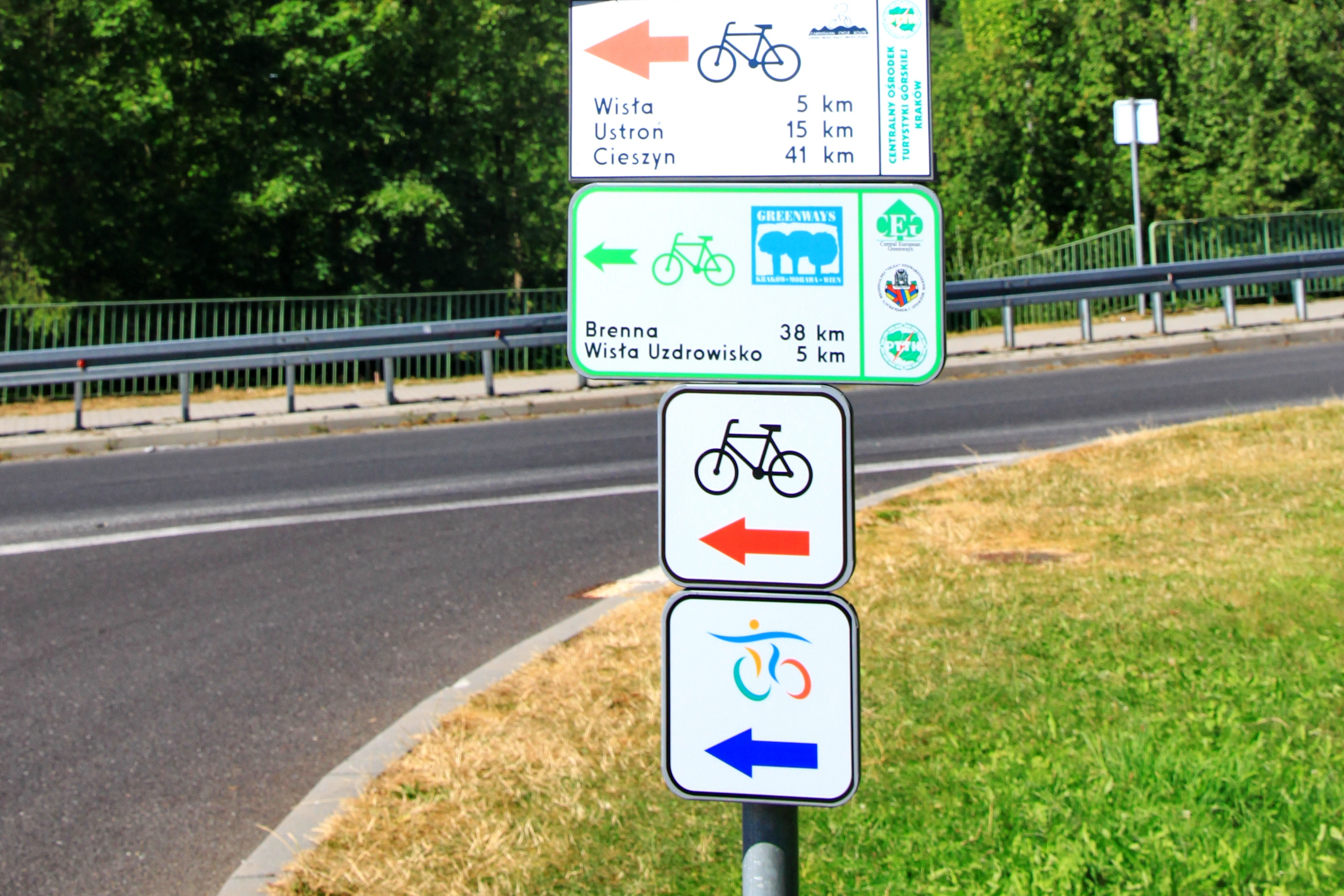
Cycle route signs in Wisła-Głębce, including WTR

In the Silesian Voivodeship, WTR runs from Wisła Uzdrowisko railway station through Wisła, Ustroń, Skoczów, Ochaby, Drogomyśl, Zabłocie, Chybie, Zabrzeg, the area of Goczałkowice Reservoir, Czechowice-Dziedzice and Kaniów to Dankowice near the border with the Lesser Poland Voivodeship. The regional tourism portal gives the length of the section as 79 km (49 mi). It is marked with R4-type signs with the WTR logo.

According to the Silesian tourism description, cycleways make up 31% of the section, asphalt public roads 53%, and unpaved or off-road sections 16%. From Wisła through Ustroń and Skoczów to Ochaby Wielkie the route mostly follows the Vistula on cycleways or roads with limited motor traffic; farther north it uses mainly local roads with low traffic.

=== Lesser Poland Voivodeship ===
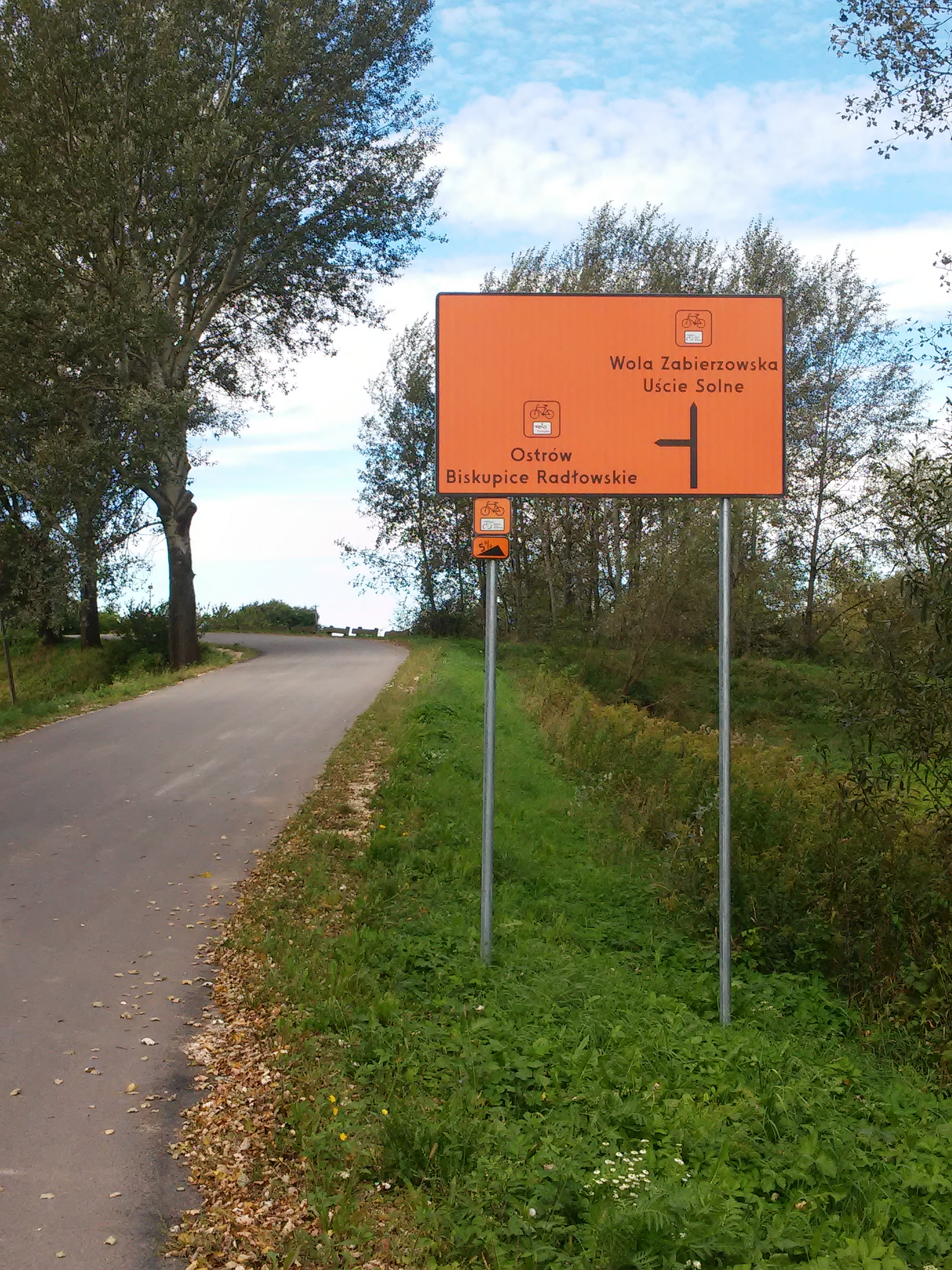
Junction of WTR and VeloDunajec

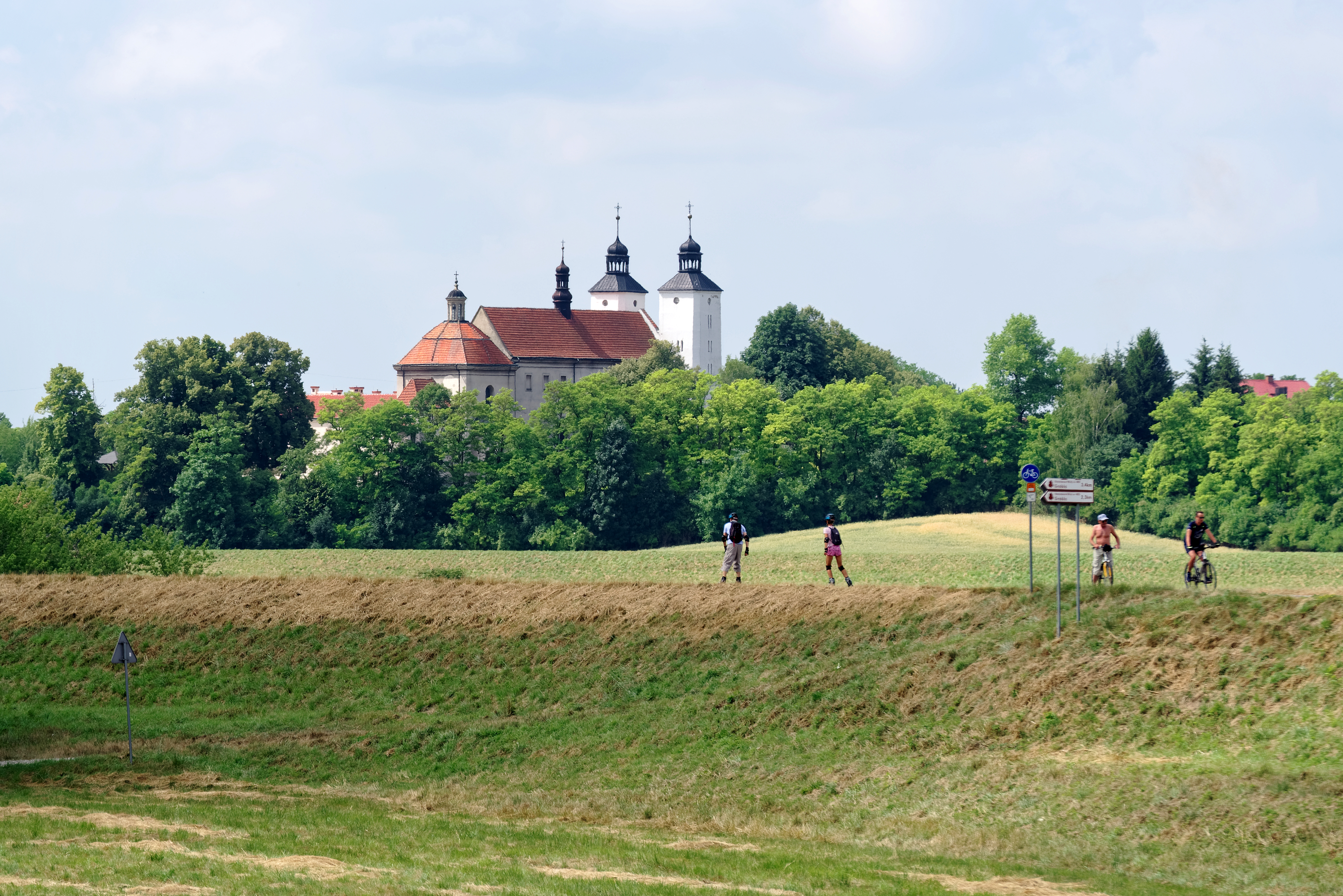
View from the Lesser Poland section near Hebdów

In the Lesser Poland Voivodeship, WTR starts in Jawiszowice at the border with Silesia and runs through the areas of Oświęcim, Skawina, Kraków, Niepołomice, Wietrzychowice and Ujście Jezuickie to Szczucin at the border with the Świętokrzyskie Voivodeship. VeloMałopolska describes the Lesser Poland section as largely completed, with 215 km (134 mi) out of more than 230 km (140 mi) ready for riding.

The section is part of the VeloMałopolska network and forms its principal east–west axis along the Vistula. It connects with VeloMetropolis / EuroVelo 4, VeloDunajec, VeloRaba, VeloSkawa and local routes branching away from the river.

In 2026, funding was awarded for additional missing sections in Wietrzychowice and Wieliczka. The Wietrzychowice section is planned to run for about 1.7 km (1.1 mi) on the embankments of the Dunajec, while the Wieliczka section is planned to run for about 6.25 km (3.88 mi) on the embankments of the Vistula, Serafa and Podłężanka, with two cycle bridges.

=== Middle Vistula voivodeships ===
In the Świętokrzyskie, Podkarpackie, Lublin and Masovian voivodeships, WTR is not a continuous completed and marked route comparable with the Silesian, Lesser Poland or Kuyavian-Pomeranian sections. Several parts are planned under the concept known as Blue Valley – Wiślanym Szlakiem.

In the Świętokrzyskie Voivodeship, project sources describe two planned sections: Szczucin–Połaniec and Ciszyca–Sandomierz, with a large share to be routed on flood embankments. In the Podkarpackie Voivodeship, the concept includes Połaniec–Sandomierz and Sandomierz–Zawichost sections, following the Vistula and the valleys of its tributaries where possible. In the Lublin Voivodeship, the preliminary concept proposes a route along the Vistula corridor, largely on flood embankments, through municipalities including Annopol, Józefów nad Wisłą, Łaziska, Wilków, Kazimierz Dolny, Puławy, Dęblin and Stężyca.

=== Kuyavian-Pomeranian Voivodeship ===
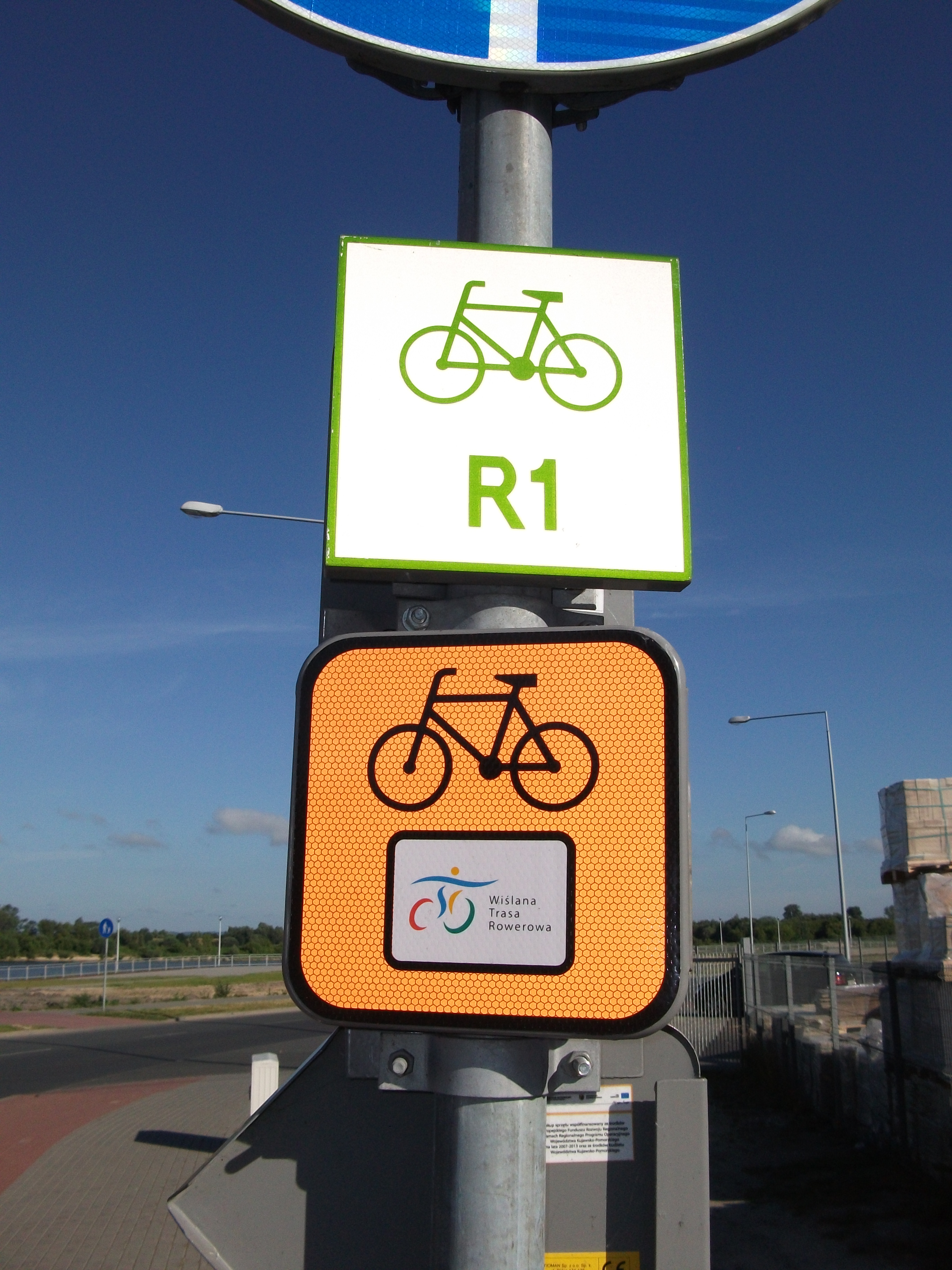
Signage of WTR and the international R-1 cycle route in Grudziądz

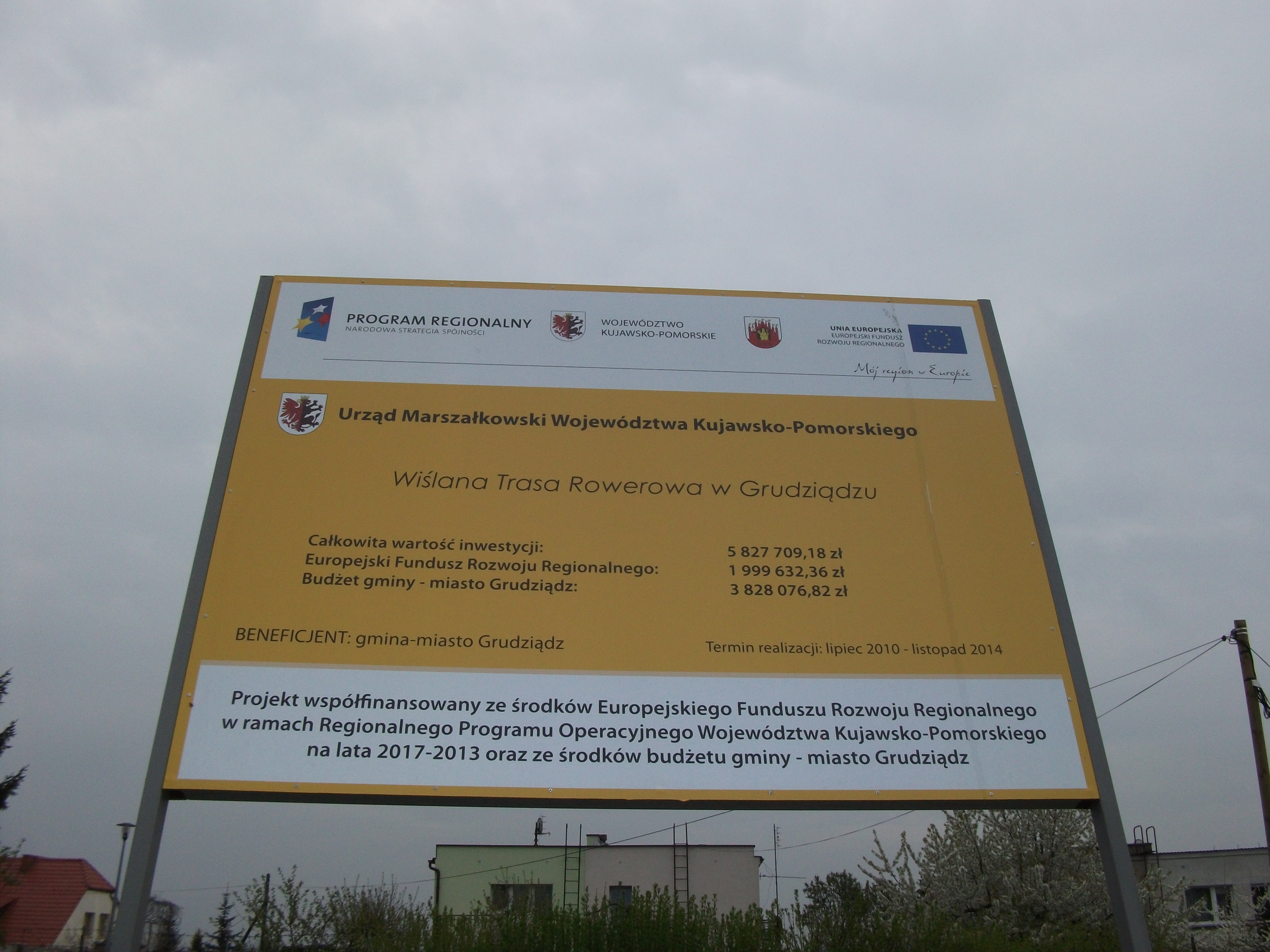
Information board for WTR in Grudziądz

In the Kuyavian-Pomeranian Voivodeship, WTR is marked on both banks of the Vistula. The right-bank section is 212 km (132 mi) long and the left-bank section 238 km (148 mi), for a total of about 450 km (280 mi). It runs from the border with the Masovian Voivodeship near Włocławek and Dobrzyń nad Wisłą to the border with the Pomeranian Voivodeship near Grudziądz and Nowe.

The route passes through or near the region's major cities, including Bydgoszcz, Toruń, Włocławek and Grudziądz, as well as Chełmno and Świecie. It mostly uses local roads and has a touring character.

=== Pomeranian Voivodeship ===
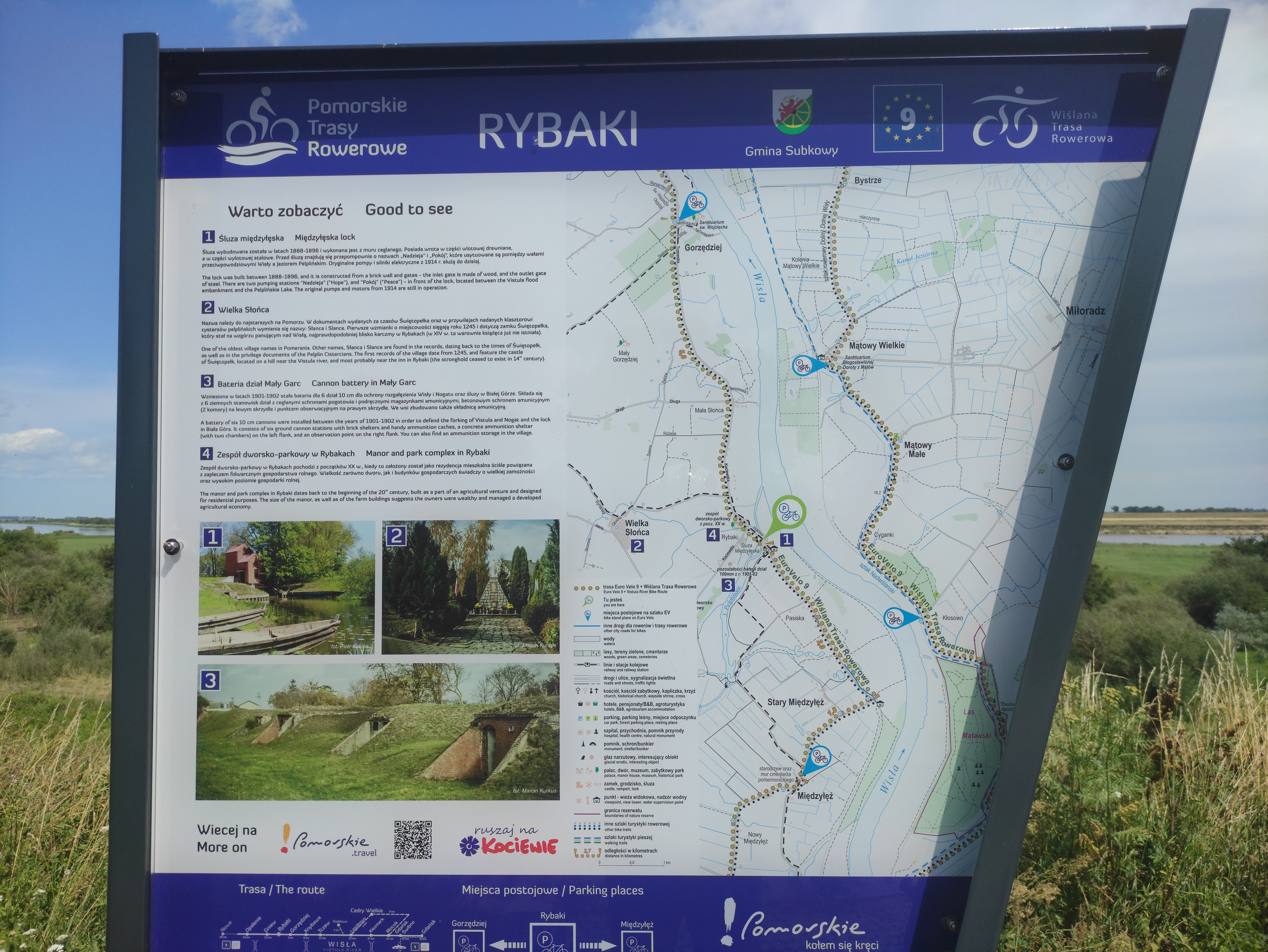
Information panel near the route in Rybaki, Subkowy municipality

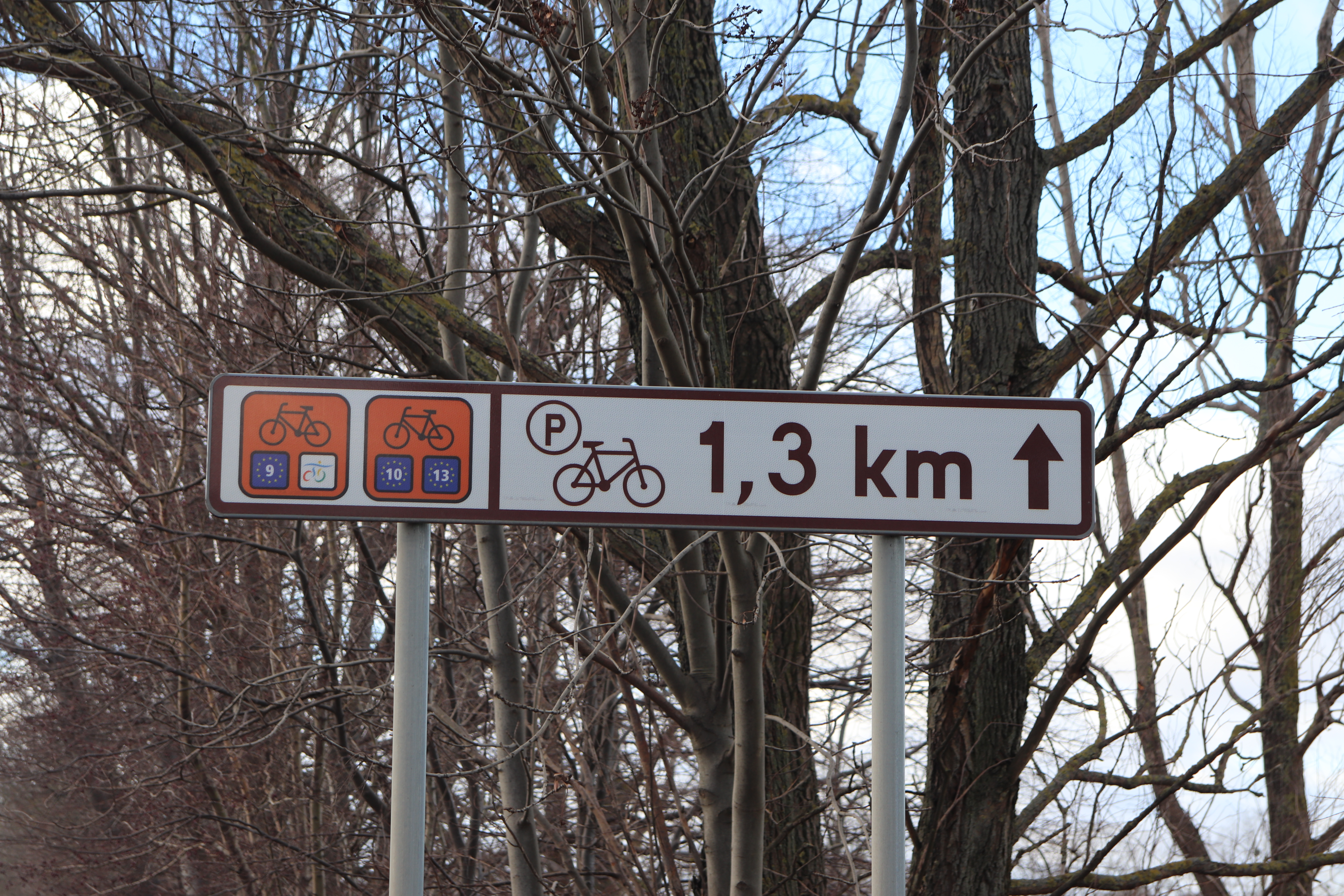
Cycle route near Bogatka in Pomerania

In the Pomeranian Voivodeship, WTR is implemented together with the international EuroVelo 9 route. Regional documents use the EV9/WTR designation for the main route and R9 for selected links, including connections to railway stations and tourist attractions.

The route is planned on both sides of the Vistula. Regional materials describe a right-bank course from Gdańsk through Świbno, Mikoszewo, Drewnica, Lichnowy and Biała Góra to Kwidzyn, and a left-bank course from Gdańsk through Świbno, Tczew, Gniew and Opalenie.

The route remains under development, but several sections are already available. The Gdańsk–Tczew section runs largely along the crest of the Vistula embankment, partly on asphalt cycleways, while other parts use local roads and existing cycle infrastructure. Stage 2 of the Pomeranian cycling routes programme is intended to fill gaps in the EV9/WTR route, including sections in Suchy Dąb, Stegna, Miłoradz and Lichnowy.

== Bicycle traffic ==
Selected automatic bicycle counters operate on or near WTR, including counters in Pomerania and Kraków. The Pomeranian figures below relate to counters on the Pomeranian cycling route network, including WTR-related locations, while the Kraków figures relate to counters on routes along the Vistula corridor.

Bicycle counts at selected locations
Location	2020	2021	2022	2023	2024	2025
Kwidzyn	37,700	44,400	38,600	48,400	48,700	44,700
Tczew	20,100	30,600	30,000	36,000	41,100	34,000
Kiezmark	10,800	10,900	12,600	16,800	20,900	17,500
Kraków – Tyniecka	327,400	350,500	388,000	458,700	506,100	461,700
Kraków – Vistula boulevards	649,600	550,300	596,900	602,400	638,500	584,300
Kraków – Niepołomska		293,300	288,700	296,900	314,600	285,200

In Pomerania, the regional network of 11 bicycle counters recorded 1,471,066 bicycle passages in 2025. This total covers the measured Pomeranian cycling route network as a whole and not only WTR.

== Gallery ==
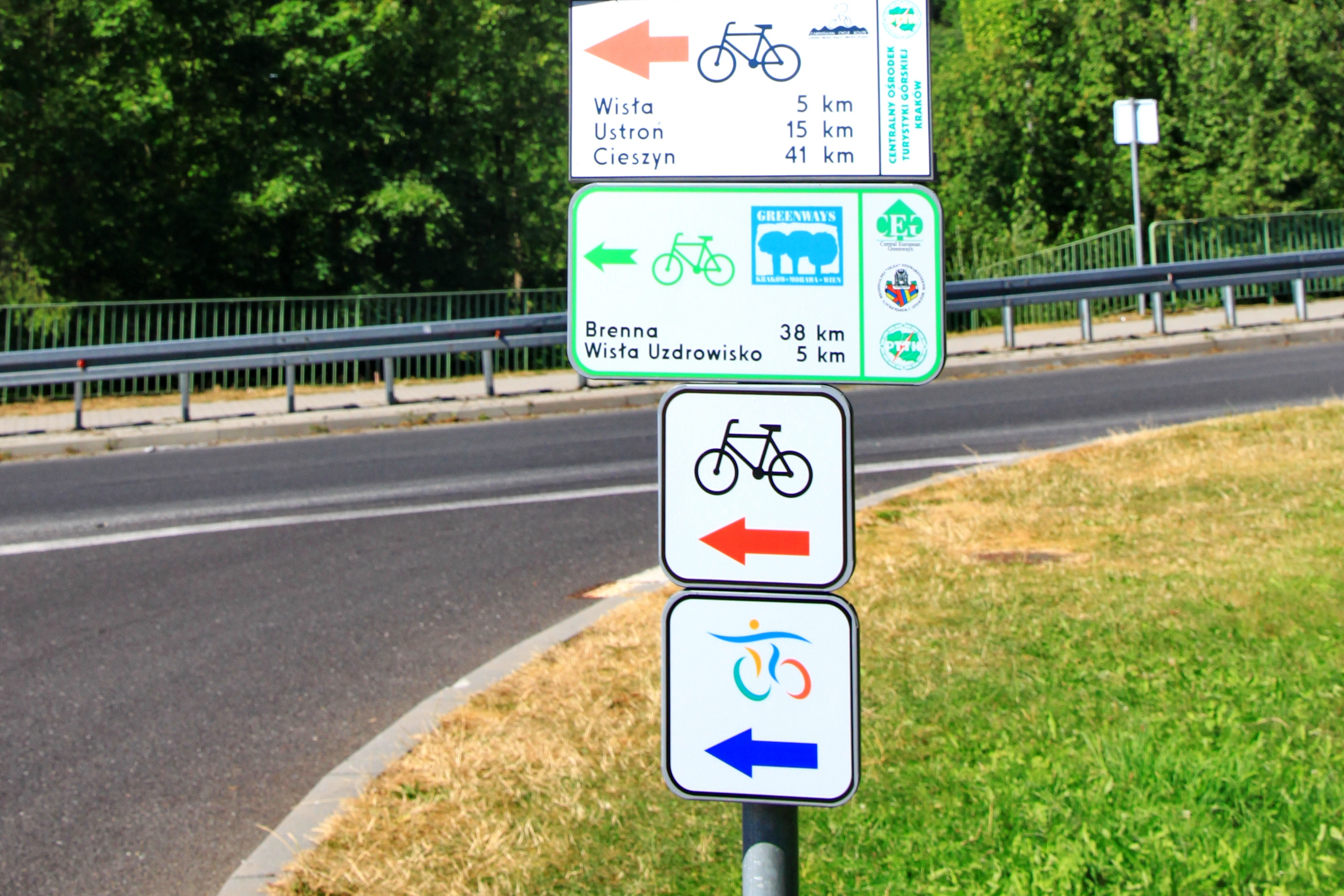
Cycle route signs in Wisła-Głębce

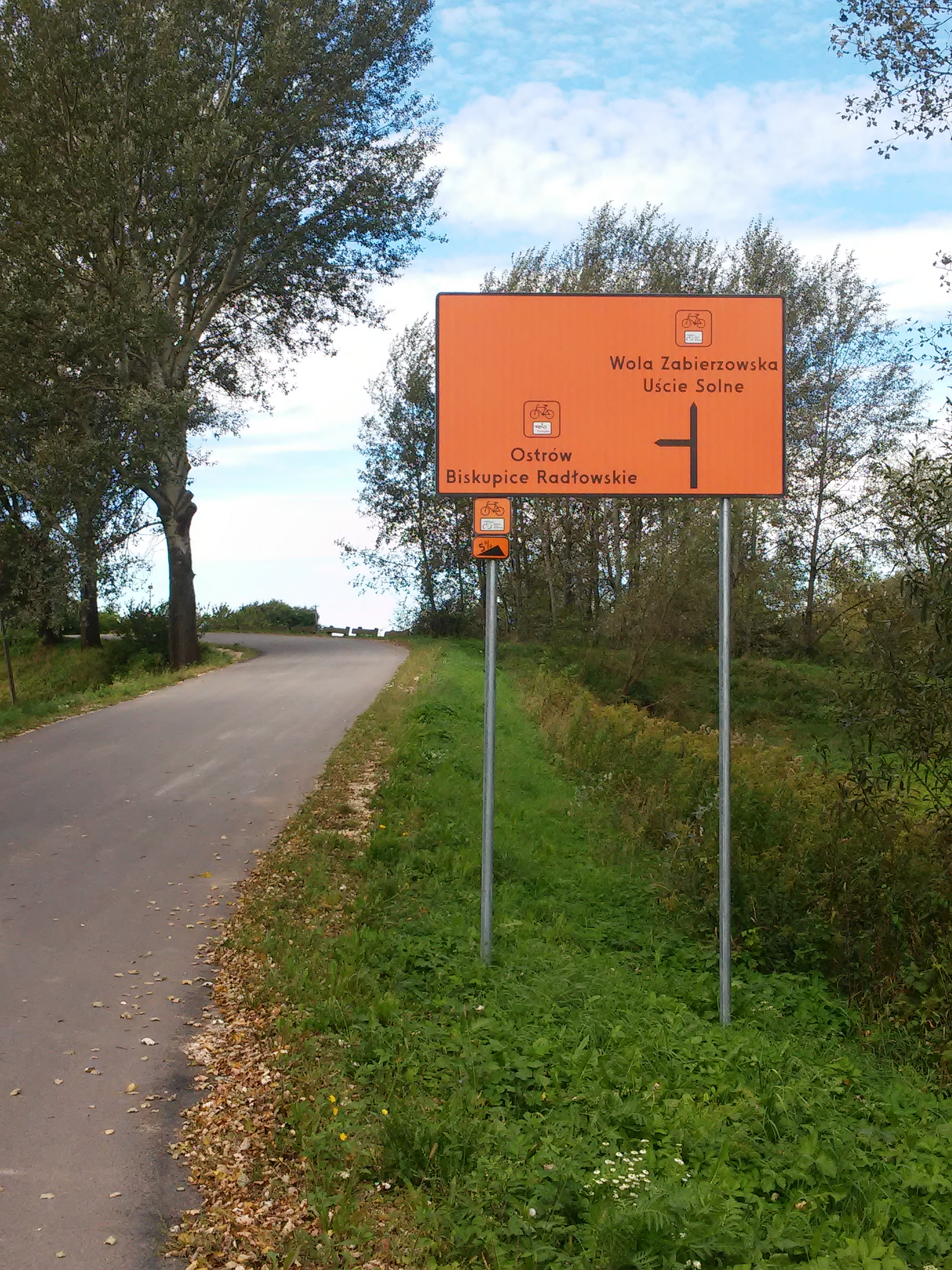
Junction of VeloDunajec and WTR

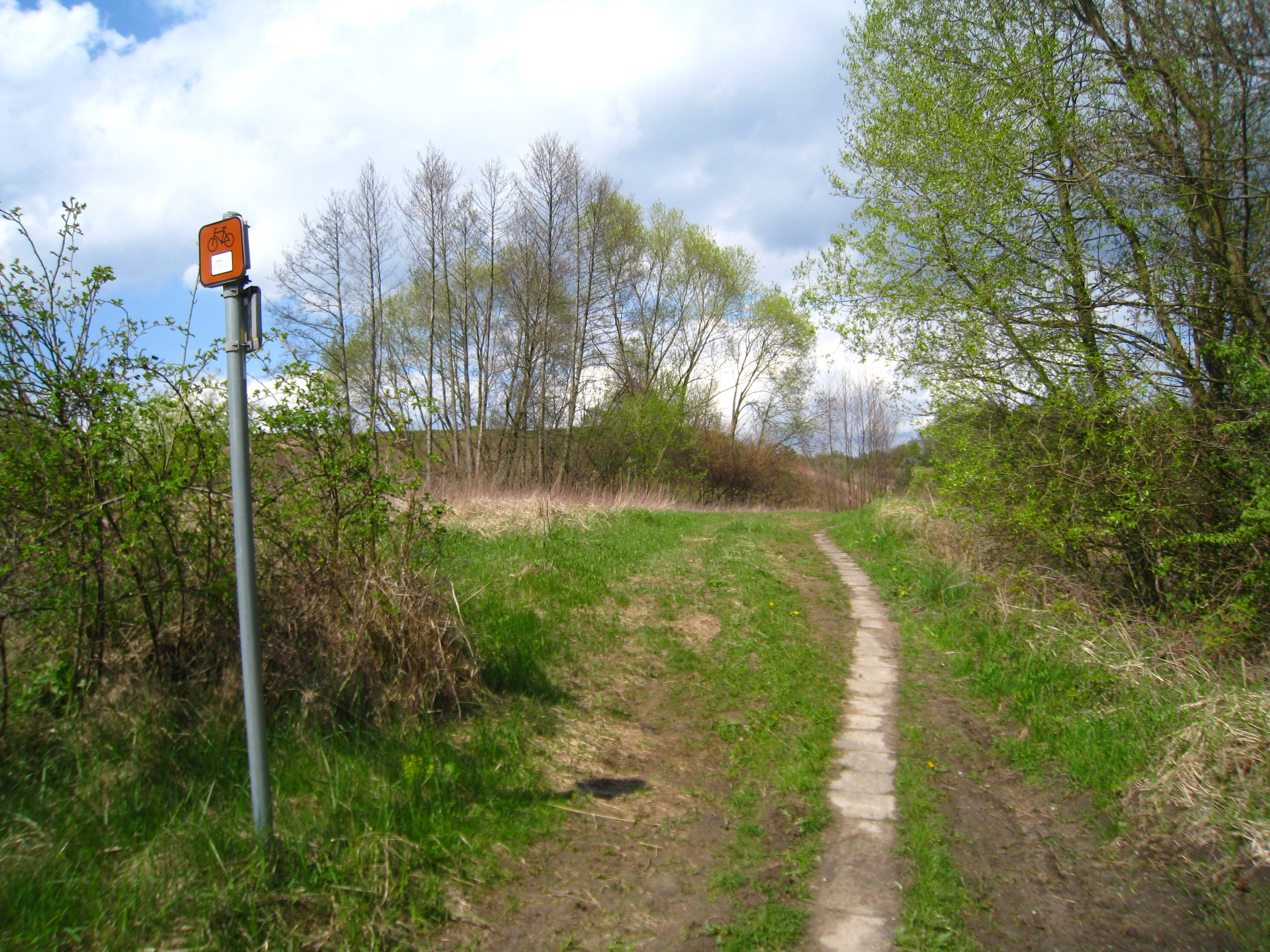
WTR near Włocławek

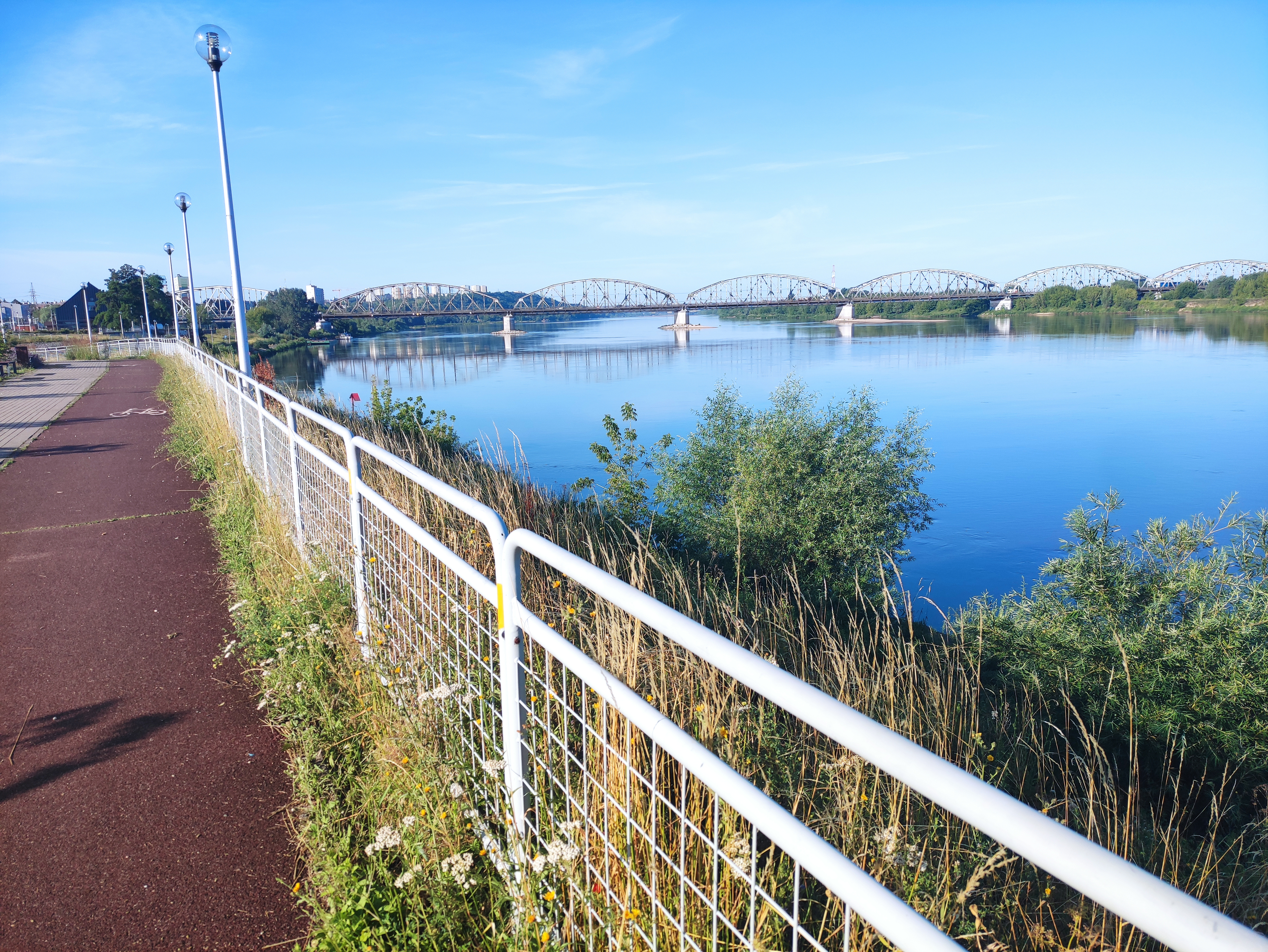
Vistula waterfront in Grudziądz

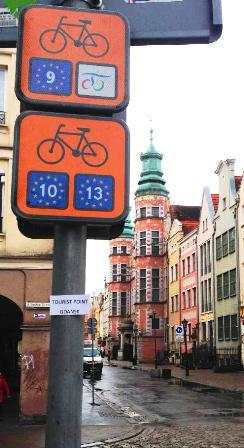
EuroVelo signage in Gdańsk

== See also ==
- EuroVelo
- EuroVelo 4
- EuroVelo 9
- Vistula
