= Wola Żelichowska =

- Village
- Location within Poland
- Coordinates: 50°14′18″N 20°49′02″E
- Country: Poland
- Voivodeship: Lesser Poland
- County: Dąbrowa
- Gmina: Gręboszów

Wola Żelichowska [ˈvɔla ʐɛliˈxɔfska] is a village in the administrative district of Gmina Gręboszów, within Dąbrowa County, Lesser Poland Voivodeship, in southern Poland.
