= Samborzec =

- Village
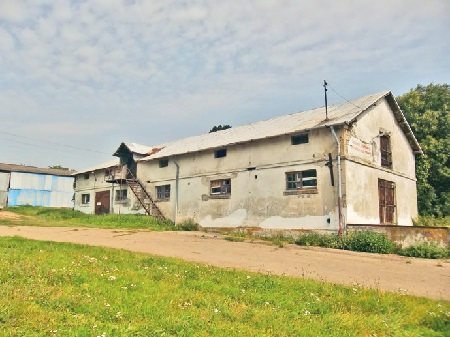

- Location within Poland
- Coordinates: 50°38′58″N 21°39′25″E
- Country: Poland
- Voivodeship: Świętokrzyskie
- County: Sandomierz
- Gmina: Samborzec
- Population: 500

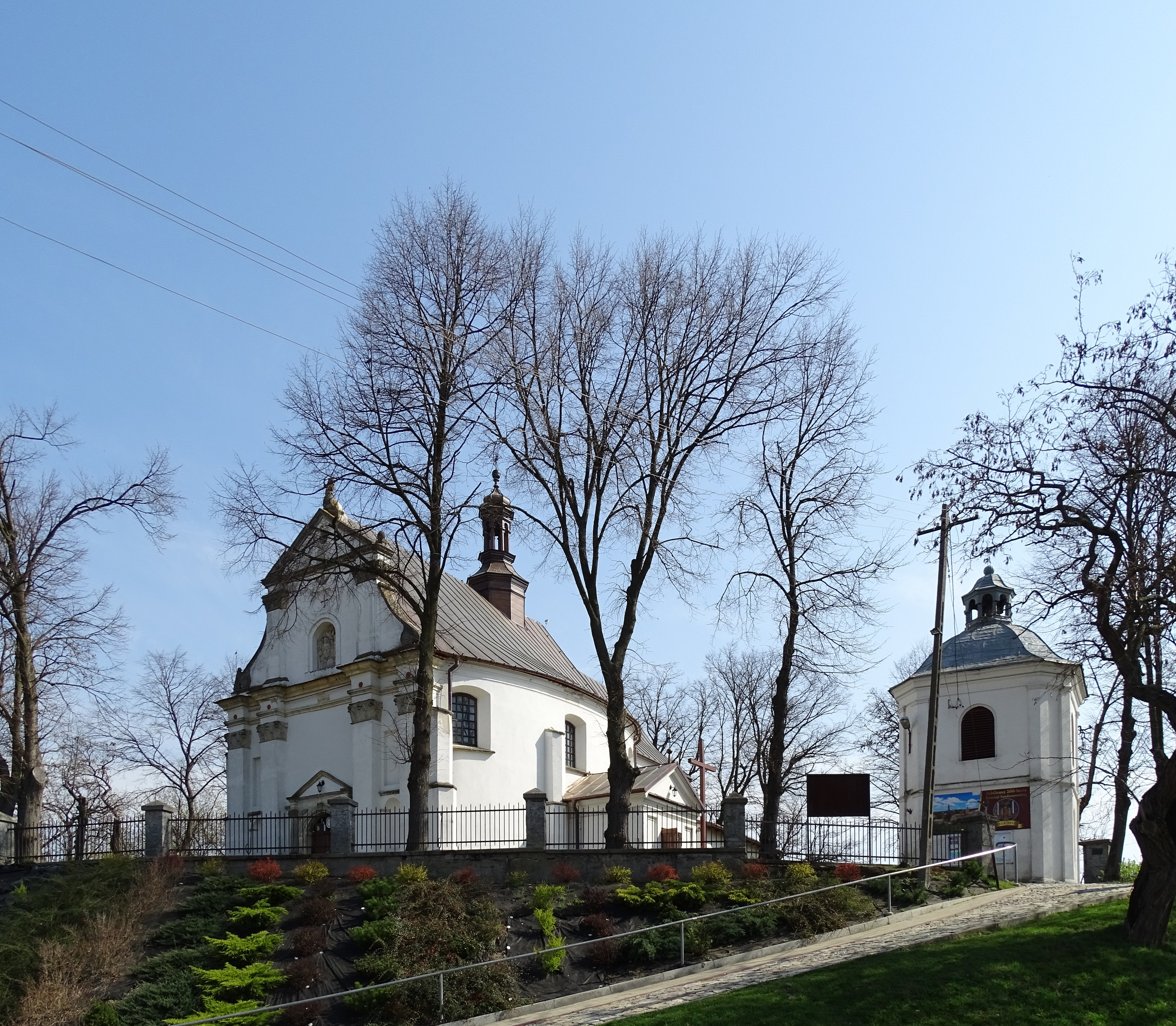
Church of the Holy Trinity, built in the XIII century, rebuilt in the XVII.

Samborzec [samˈbɔʐɛt͡s] is a village in Sandomierz County, Świętokrzyskie Voivodeship, in south-central Poland. It is the seat of the gmina (administrative district) called Gmina Samborzec. It lies approximately 8 km (5 mi) south-west of Sandomierz and 78 km (48 mi) east of the regional capital Kielce.
