= Chwałki, Świętokrzyskie Voivodeship =

Chwałki
- Village
- Location within Poland
- Coordinates: 50°42′39″N 21°42′43″E
- Country: Poland
- Voivodeship: Świętokrzyskie
- County: Sandomierz
- Gmina: Obrazów
- Population: 850

Chwałki [ˈxfau̯ki] is a village in the administrative district of Gmina Obrazów, within Sandomierz County, Świętokrzyskie Voivodeship, in south-central Poland. It lies approximately 6 km (4 mi) east of Obrazów, 5 km (3 mi) north-west of Sandomierz, and 80 km (50 mi) east of the regional capital Kielce.
