= Święcica, Sandomierz County =

Święcica
- Village
- Location within Poland
- Coordinates: 50°42′19″N 21°34′46″E
- Country: Poland
- Voivodeship: Świętokrzyskie
- County: Sandomierz
- Gmina: Obrazów
- Population: 410

Święcica (Polish pronunciation: [ɕfjɛɲˈt͡ɕit͡sa]) is a village in the administrative district of Gmina Obrazów, within Sandomierz County, Świętokrzyskie Voivodeship, in south-central Poland. It lies approximately 5 km (3 mi) west of Obrazów, 13 km (8 mi) west of Sandomierz, and 71 km (44 mi) east of the regional capital Kielce.
