= Piekary, Świętokrzyskie Voivodeship =

Piekary
- Village
- Location within Poland
- Coordinates: 50°41′11″N 21°35′13″E
- Country: Poland
- Voivodeship: Świętokrzyskie
- County: Sandomierz
- Gmina: Obrazów
- Population: 206

Piekary [pjɛˈkarɨ] is a village in the administrative district of Gmina Obrazów, within Sandomierz County, Świętokrzyskie Voivodeship, in south-central Poland. It lies approximately 4 km (2 mi) west of Obrazów, 12 km (7 mi) west of Sandomierz, and 72 km (45 mi) east of the regional capital Kielce.
