= Zdanów, Świętokrzyskie Voivodeship =

Zdanów
- Village
- Location within Poland
- Coordinates: 50°42′8″N 21°33′4″E
- Country: Poland
- Voivodeship: Świętokrzyskie
- County: Sandomierz
- Gmina: Obrazów
- Population: 300

Zdanów [ˈzdanuf] is a village in the administrative district of Gmina Obrazów, within Sandomierz County, Świętokrzyskie Voivodeship, in south-central Poland. It lies approximately 7 km (4 mi) west of Obrazów, 15 km (9 mi) west of Sandomierz, and 69 km (43 mi) east of the regional capital Kielce.
