= Konary-Kolonia =

- Village
- Location within Poland
- Coordinates: 50°40′59″N 21°21′59″E
- Country: Poland
- Voivodeship: Świętokrzyskie
- County: Sandomierz
- Gmina: Klimontów

Konary-Kolonia [kɔˈnarɨ kɔˈlɔɲa] is a village in the administrative district of Gmina Klimontów, within Sandomierz County, Świętokrzyskie Voivodeship, in south-central Poland. It lies approximately 7 km (4 mi) north-west of Klimontów, 28 km (17 mi) west of Sandomierz, and 58 km (36 mi) south-east of the regional capital Kielce.
