= Łukawa, Świętokrzyskie Voivodeship =

Łukawa
- Village
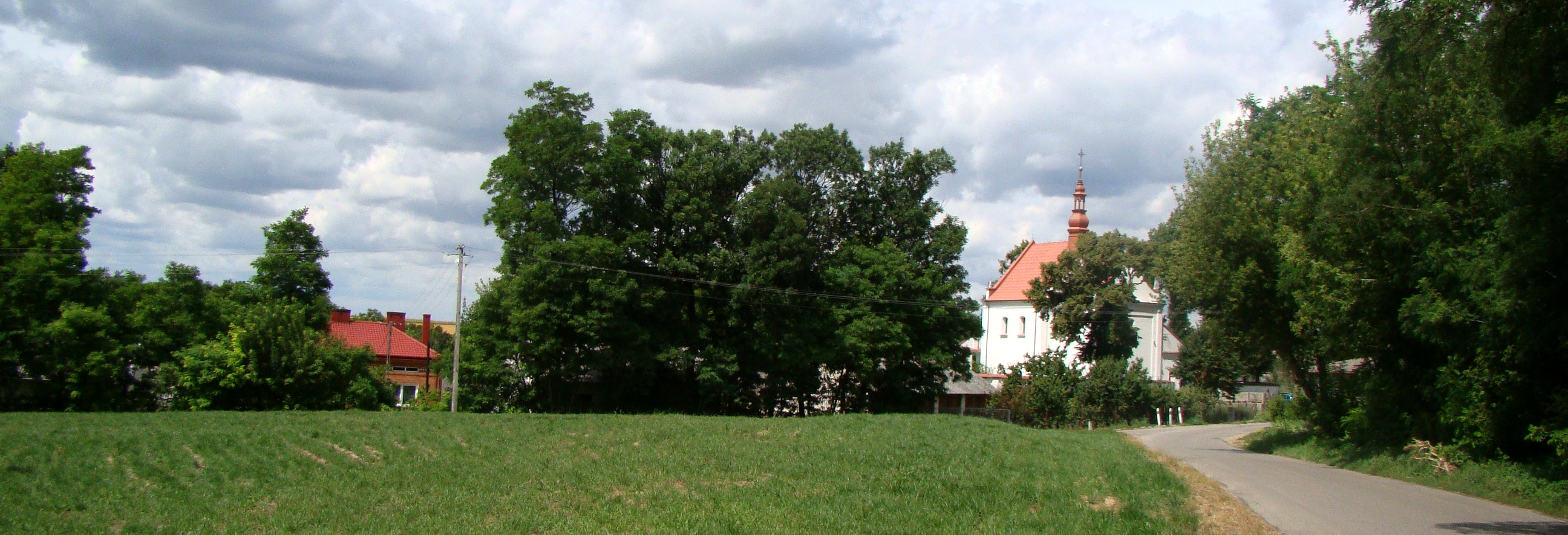
- Church in Łukawa

- Location within Poland
- Coordinates: 50°45′50″N 21°42′4″E
- Country: Poland
- Voivodeship: Świętokrzyskie
- County: Sandomierz
- Gmina: Wilczyce
- Population: 450

Łukawa [wuˈkava] is a village in the administrative district of Gmina Wilczyce, within Sandomierz County, Świętokrzyskie Voivodeship, in south-central Poland. It lies approximately 4 km (2 mi) north-east of Wilczyce, 10 km (6 mi) north of Sandomierz, and 78 km (48 mi) east of the regional capital Kielce.
