= Lenarczyce =

- Village
- Location within Poland
- Coordinates: 50°42′12″N 21°40′13″E
- Country: Poland
- Voivodeship: Świętokrzyskie
- County: Sandomierz
- Gmina: Obrazów
- Population: 480

Lenarczyce [lɛnarˈt͡ʂɨt͡sɛ] is a village in the administrative district of Gmina Obrazów, within Sandomierz County, Świętokrzyskie Voivodeship, in south-central Poland. It lies approximately 3 km (2 mi) north-east of Obrazów, 7 km (4 mi) west of Sandomierz, and 77 km (48 mi) east of the regional capital Kielce.
