= Węgrce Szlacheckie =

- Village
- Location within Poland
- Coordinates: 50°39′54″N 21°30′57″E
- Country: Poland
- Voivodeship: Świętokrzyskie
- County: Sandomierz
- Gmina: Klimontów

Węgrce Szlacheckie [ˈvɛŋɡrt͡sɛ ʂlaˈxɛt͡skʲɛ] is a village in the administrative district of Gmina Klimontów, within Sandomierz County, Świętokrzyskie Voivodeship, in south-central Poland. It lies approximately 5 km (3 mi) east of Klimontów, 17 km (11 mi) west of Sandomierz, and 68 km (42 mi) east of the regional capital Kielce.
