= Bilcza, Sandomierz County =

Bilcza
- Village
- Location within Poland
- Coordinates: 50°40′48″N 21°34′41″E
- Country: Poland
- Voivodeship: Świętokrzyskie
- County: Sandomierz
- Gmina: Obrazów

Bilcza [ˈbilt͡ʂa] is a village in the administrative district of Gmina Obrazów, within Sandomierz County, Świętokrzyskie Voivodeship, in south-central Poland. It lies approximately 5 km (3 mi) west of Obrazów, 13 km (8 mi) west of Sandomierz, and 72 km (45 mi) east of the regional capital Kielce.
