= Krobielice =

- Village
- Location within Poland
- Coordinates: 50°40′46″N 21°31′35″E
- Country: Poland
- Voivodeship: Świętokrzyskie
- County: Sandomierz
- Gmina: Klimontów
- Population: 220

Krobielice [krɔbjɛˈlit͡sɛ] is a village in the administrative district of Gmina Klimontów, within Sandomierz County, Świętokrzyskie Voivodeship, in south-central Poland. It lies approximately 6 km (4 mi) north-east of Klimontów, 16 km (10 mi) west of Sandomierz, and 68 km (42 mi) east of the regional capital Kielce.
