= Pielaszów =

- Village
- Location within Poland
- Coordinates: 50°45′33″N 21°34′11″E
- Country: Poland
- Voivodeship: Świętokrzyskie
- County: Sandomierz
- Gmina: Wilczyce
- Population: 200

Pielaszów [pjɛˈlaʂuf] is a village in the administrative district of Gmina Wilczyce, within Sandomierz County, Świętokrzyskie Voivodeship, in south-central Poland. It lies approximately 7 km (4 mi) west of Wilczyce, 16 km (10 mi) north-west of Sandomierz, and 69 km (43 mi) east of the regional capital Kielce.
