= Gałkowice-Ocin =

- Village
- Location within Poland
- Coordinates: 50°44′22″N 21°42′55″E
- Country: Poland
- Voivodeship: Świętokrzyskie
- County: Sandomierz
- Gmina: Wilczyce
- Population: 230

Gałkowice-Ocin [ɡau̯kɔˈvit͡sɛ ˈɔt͡ɕin] is a village in the administrative district of Gmina Wilczyce, within Sandomierz County, Świętokrzyskie Voivodeship, in south-central Poland. It lies approximately 5 km (3 mi) east of Wilczyce, 7 km (4 mi) north of Sandomierz, and 79 km (49 mi) east of the regional capital Kielce.
