= Pęchów =

- Village
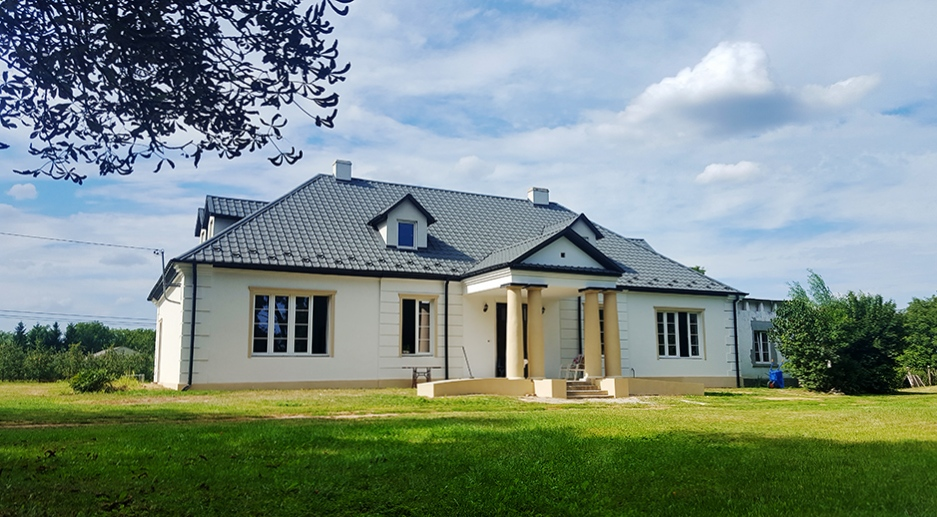
- Manor house

- Location within Poland
- Coordinates: 50°40′24″N 21°26′55″E
- Country: Poland
- Voivodeship: Świętokrzyskie
- County: Sandomierz
- Gmina: Klimontów
- Population: 450

Pęchów [ˈpɛ̃xuf] is a village in the administrative district of Gmina Klimontów, within Sandomierz County, Świętokrzyskie Voivodeship, in south-central Poland. It lies approximately 2 km (1 mi) north of Klimontów, 22 km (14 mi) west of Sandomierz, and 64 km (40 mi) east of the regional capital Kielce.
