= Dziewków =

- Village
- Location within Poland
- Coordinates: 50°39′50″N 21°30′0″E
- Country: Poland
- Voivodeship: Świętokrzyskie
- County: Sandomierz
- Gmina: Klimontów

Dziewków [ˈd͡ʑɛfkuf] is a village in the administrative district of Gmina Klimontów, within Sandomierz County, Świętokrzyskie Voivodeship, in south-central Poland. It lies approximately 4 km (2 mi) east of Klimontów, 18 km (11 mi) west of Sandomierz, and 67 km (42 mi) east of the regional capital Kielce.
