= Beradz =

- Village
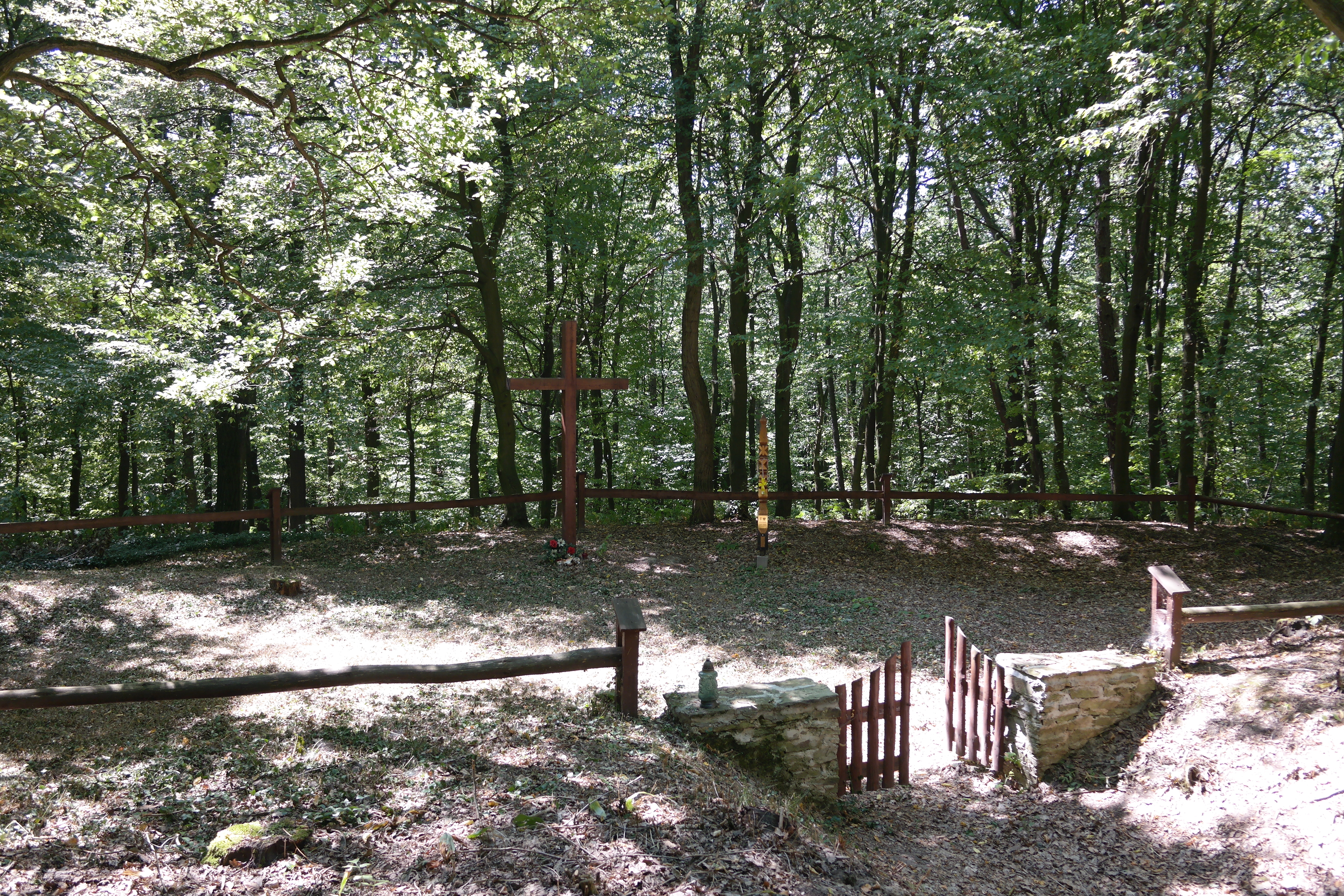
- Cemetery

- Location within Poland
- Coordinates: 50°41′48″N 21°25′9″E
- Country: Poland
- Voivodeship: Świętokrzyskie
- County: Sandomierz
- Gmina: Klimontów

Beradz [ˈbɛrat͡s] is a village in the administrative district of Gmina Klimontów, within Sandomierz County, Świętokrzyskie Voivodeship, in south-central Poland. It lies approximately 6 km (4 mi) north-west of Klimontów, 24 km (15 mi) west of Sandomierz, and 61 km (38 mi) east of the regional capital Kielce.
