= Daromin =

- Village
- Location within Poland
- Coordinates: 50°45′59″N 21°36′51″E
- Country: Poland
- Voivodeship: Świętokrzyskie
- County: Sandomierz
- Gmina: Wilczyce
- Population: 480

Daromin [daˈrɔmin] is a village in the administrative district of Gmina Wilczyce, located within Sandomierz County, Świętokrzyskie Voivodeship, in south-central Poland. It lies approximately 4 km (2 mi) north-west of Wilczyce, 14 km (9 mi) north-west of Sandomierz, and 72 km (45 mi) east of the regional capital Kielce.
