= Węgrce Panieńskie =

- Village
- Location within Poland
- Coordinates: 50°41′52″N 21°36′8″E
- Country: Poland
- Voivodeship: Świętokrzyskie
- County: Sandomierz
- Gmina: Obrazów
- Population: 360

Węgrce Panieńskie [ˈvɛŋɡrt͡sɛ paˈɲɛɲskʲɛ] is a village in the administrative district of Gmina Obrazów, within Sandomierz County, Świętokrzyskie Voivodeship, in south-central Poland. It lies approximately 3 km (2 mi) west of Obrazów, 11 km (7 mi) west of Sandomierz, and 73 km (45 mi) east of the regional capital Kielce.
