= Bugaj, Sandomierz County =

Bugaj
- Village
- Location within Poland
- Coordinates: 50°46′32″N 21°40′4″E
- Country: Poland
- Voivodeship: Świętokrzyskie
- County: Sandomierz
- Gmina: Wilczyce
- Population: 90

Bugaj [ˈbuɡai̯] is a village in the administrative district of Gmina Wilczyce, within Sandomierz County, Świętokrzyskie Voivodeship, in south-central Poland. It lies approximately 4 km (2 mi) north of Wilczyce, 12 km (7 mi) north-west of Sandomierz, and 75 km (47 mi) east of the regional capital Kielce.
