= Świątniki, Sandomierz County =

Świątniki
- Village
- Location within Poland
- Coordinates: 50°40′19″N 21°34′1″E
- Country: Poland
- Voivodeship: Świętokrzyskie
- County: Sandomierz
- Gmina: Obrazów
- Population: 470

Świątniki (Polish pronunciation: [ɕfjɔntˈɲikʲi]) is a village in the administrative district of Gmina Obrazów, within Sandomierz County, Świętokrzyskie Voivodeship, in south-central Poland. It lies approximately 6 km (4 mi) south-west of Obrazów, 13 km (8 mi) west of Sandomierz, and 71 km (44 mi) east of the regional capital Kielce.
