= Ocinek =

- Village
- Location within Poland
- Coordinates: 50°44′N 21°43′E
- Country: Poland
- Voivodeship: Świętokrzyskie
- County: Sandomierz
- Gmina: Wilczyce

Ocinek [ɔˈt͡ɕinɛk] is a village in the administrative district of Gmina Wilczyce, within Sandomierz County, Świętokrzyskie Voivodeship, in south-central Poland. It lies approximately 5 km (3 mi) east of Wilczyce, 7 km (4 mi) north-west of Sandomierz, and 80 km (50 mi) east of the regional capital Kielce.
