= Rybnica, Świętokrzyskie Voivodeship =

Rybnica
- Village
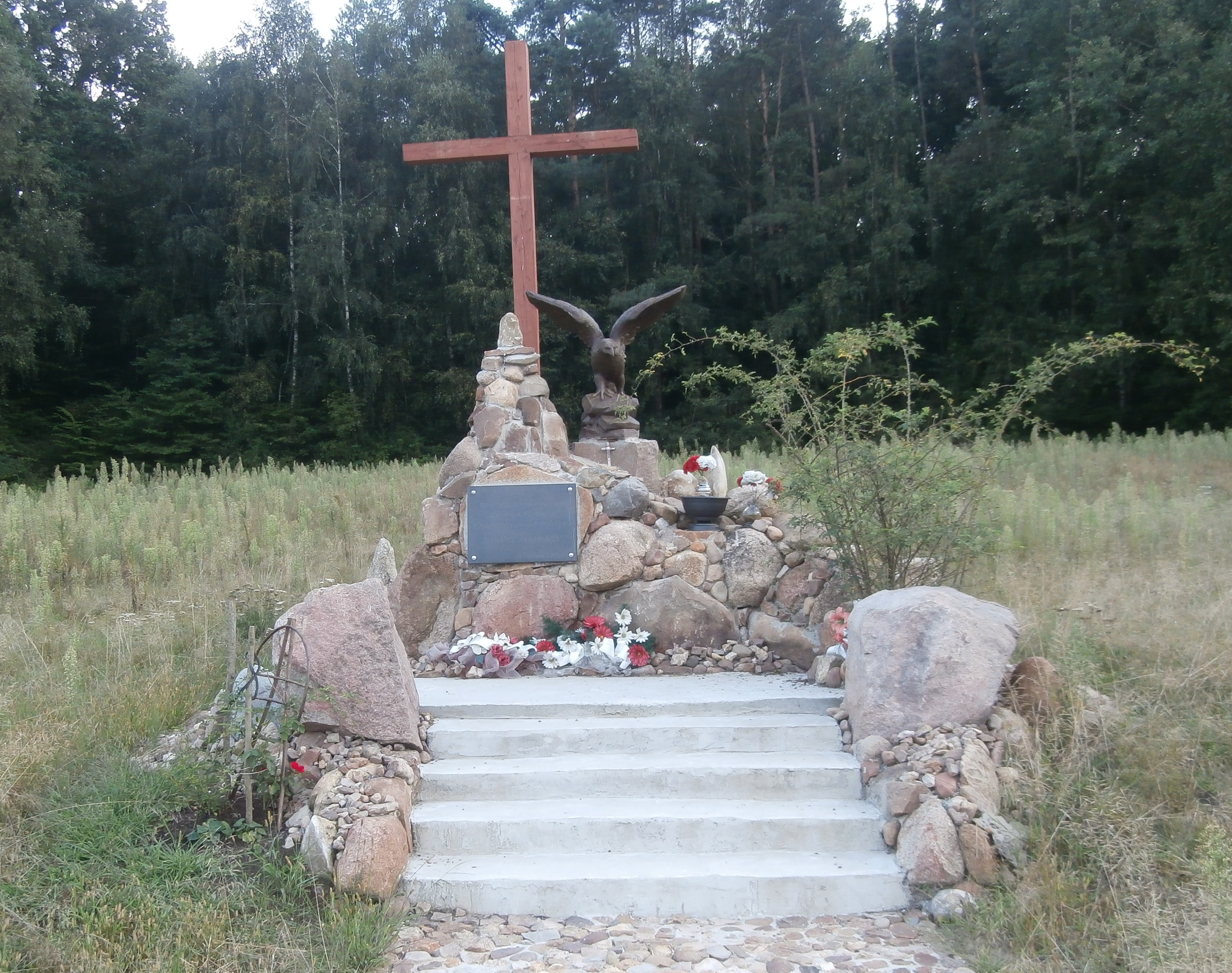
- Memorial at the site of the Battle of Rybnica fought in 1863

- Location within Poland
- Coordinates: 50°36′11″N 21°25′3″E
- Country: Poland
- Voivodeship: Świętokrzyskie
- County: Sandomierz
- Gmina: Klimontów
- Population: 90
- Time zone: UTC+1 (CET)
  - Summer (DST): UTC+2 (CEST)
- Vehicle registration: TSA

Rybnica [rɨbˈnit͡sa] is a village in the administrative district of Gmina Klimontów, within Sandomierz County, Świętokrzyskie Voivodeship, in south-central Poland. It lies approximately 7 km (4 mi) south-west of Klimontów, 26 km (16 mi) west of Sandomierz, and 65 km (40 mi) south-east of the regional capital Kielce.

During the January Uprising, on 20 October 1863, it was the site of the Battle of Rybnica, in which Polish insurgents commanded by Dionizy Czachowski defeated Russian troops.
