= Żurawica, Świętokrzyskie Voivodeship =

Żurawica
- Village
- Location within Poland
- Coordinates: 50°41′23″N 21°41′1″E
- Country: Poland
- Voivodeship: Świętokrzyskie
- County: Sandomierz
- Gmina: Obrazów

Żurawica [ʐuraˈvit͡sa] is a village in the administrative district of Gmina Obrazów, within Sandomierz County, Świętokrzyskie Voivodeship, in south-central Poland. It lies approximately 4 km (2 mi) east of Obrazów, 5 km (3 mi) west of Sandomierz, and 79 km (49 mi) east of the regional capital Kielce.
