= Płaczkowice =

- Village
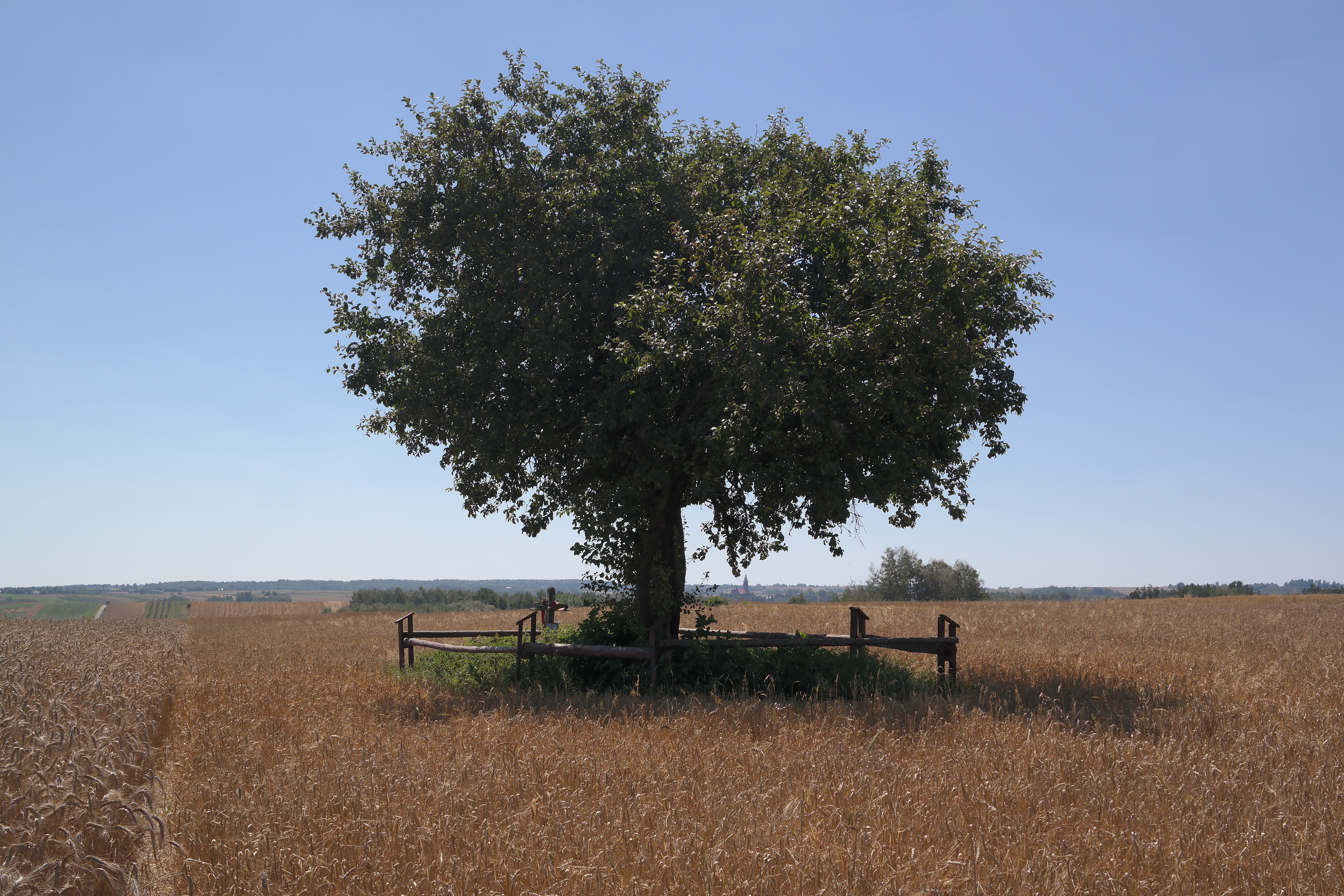

- Location within Poland
- Coordinates: 50°41′38″N 21°24′17″E
- Country: Poland
- Voivodeship: Świętokrzyskie
- County: Sandomierz
- Gmina: Klimontów
- Population: 80

Płaczkowice [pwat͡ʂkɔˈvit͡sɛ] is a village in the administrative district of Gmina Klimontów, within Sandomierz County, Świętokrzyskie Voivodeship, in south-central Poland. It lies approximately 6 km (4 mi) north-west of Klimontów, 25 km (16 mi) west of Sandomierz, and 60 km (37 mi) east of the regional capital Kielce.
