= Pokrzywianka, Sandomierz County =

Pokrzywianka
- Village
- Location within Poland
- Coordinates: 50°40′16″N 21°24′32″E
- Country: Poland
- Voivodeship: Świętokrzyskie
- County: Sandomierz
- Gmina: Klimontów

Pokrzywianka [pɔkʂɨˈvjaŋka] is a village in the administrative district of Gmina Klimontów, within Sandomierz County, Świętokrzyskie Voivodeship, in south-central Poland. It lies approximately 4 km (2 mi) northwest of Klimontów, 25 km (16 mi) west of Sandomierz, and 61 km (38 mi) southeast of the regional capital, Kielce.
