= Szymanowice Górne =

- Village
- Location within Poland
- Coordinates: 50°38′42″N 21°26′22″E
- Country: Poland
- Voivodeship: Świętokrzyskie
- County: Sandomierz
- Gmina: Klimontów
- Population: 160

Szymanowice Górne (Polish pronunciation: [ʂɨmanɔˈvit͡sɛ ˈɡurnɛ]) is a village in the administrative district of Gmina Klimontów, within Sandomierz County, Świętokrzyskie Voivodeship, in south-central Poland. It lies approximately 2 km (1 mi) south-west of Klimontów, 23 km (14 mi) west of Sandomierz, and 64 km (40 mi) south-east of the regional capital Kielce.
