= Dacharzów =

- Village
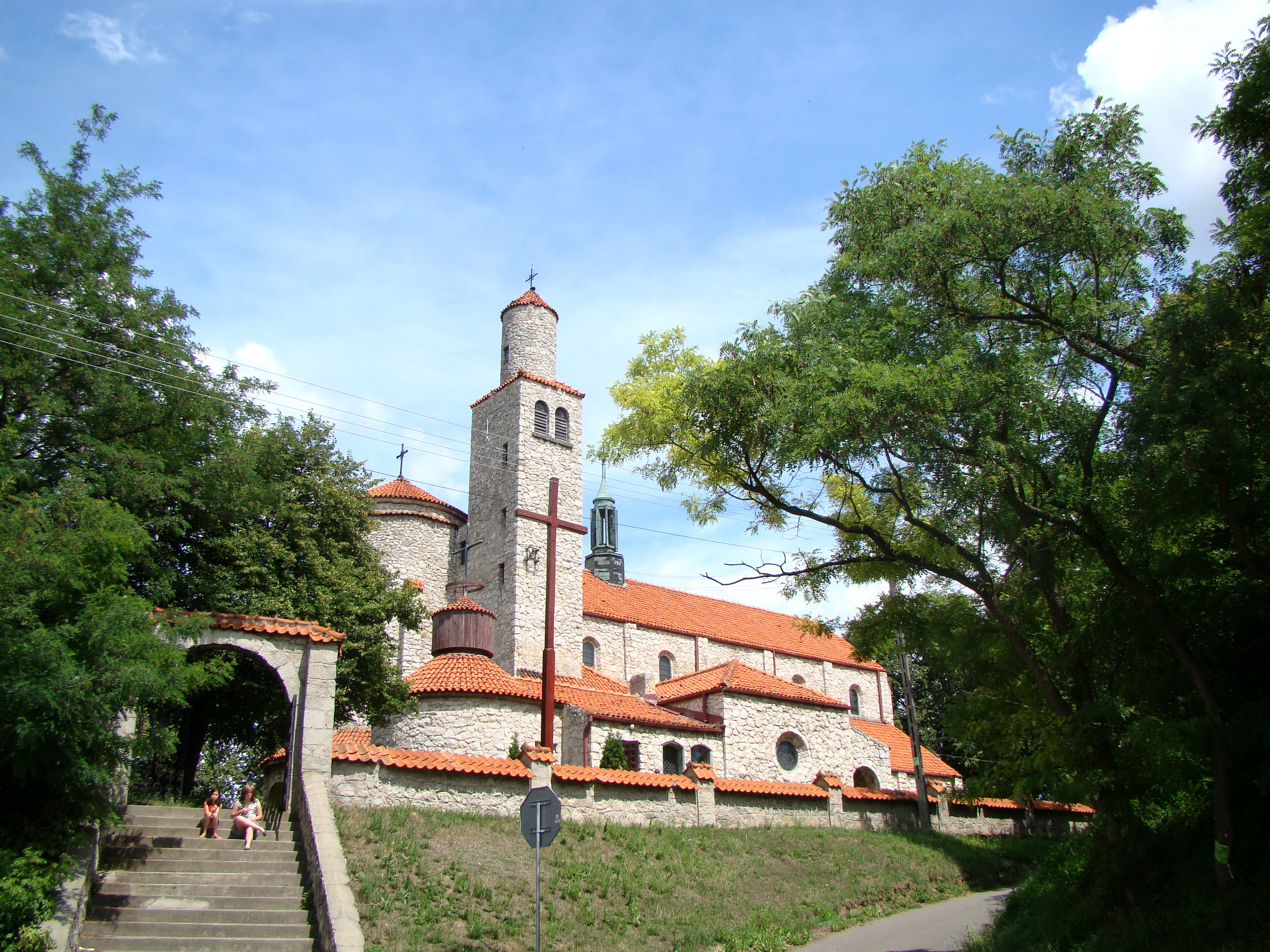
- Catholic church

- Location within Poland
- Coordinates: 50°43′49″N 21°38′35″E
- Country: Poland
- Voivodeship: Świętokrzyskie
- County: Sandomierz
- Gmina: Wilczyce
- Population: 190

Dacharzów [daˈxaʐuf] is a village in the administrative district of Gmina Wilczyce, within Sandomierz County, Świętokrzyskie Voivodeship, in south-central Poland. It lies approximately 3 km (2 mi) south-west of Wilczyce, 10 km (6 mi) north-west of Sandomierz, and 75 km (47 mi) east of the regional capital Kielce.
