= Grabina, Świętokrzyskie Voivodeship =

Grabina
- Village
- Location within Poland
- Coordinates: 50°41′48″N 21°27′23″E
- Country: Poland
- Voivodeship: Świętokrzyskie
- County: Sandomierz
- Gmina: Klimontów

Grabina [ɡraˈbina] is a village in the administrative district of Gmina Klimontów, within Sandomierz County, Świętokrzyskie Voivodeship in south-central Poland. It is approximately 5 km (3 mi) north of Klimontów, 21 km (13 mi) west of Sandomierz, and 63 km (39 mi) east of the regional capital Kielce.
