= Jantoniów =

- Village
- Location within Poland
- Coordinates: 50°42′25″N 21°28′10″E
- Country: Poland
- Voivodeship: Świętokrzyskie
- County: Sandomierz
- Gmina: Klimontów

Jantoniów [janˈtɔɲuf] is a village in the administrative district of Gmina Klimontów, within Sandomierz County, Świętokrzyskie Voivodeship, in south-central Poland. It lies approximately 6 km (4 mi) north of Klimontów, 20 km (12 mi) west of Sandomierz, and 64 km (40 mi) east of the regional capital Kielce.
