= Pęczyny =

- Village
- Location within Poland
- Coordinates: 50°44′51″N 21°36′17″E
- Country: Poland
- Voivodeship: Świętokrzyskie
- County: Sandomierz
- Gmina: Wilczyce

Pęczyny [pɛnˈt͡ʂɨnɨ] is a village in the administrative district of Gmina Wilczyce, within Sandomierz County, Świętokrzyskie Voivodeship, in south-central Poland. It lies approximately 4 km (2 mi) west of Wilczyce, 13 km (8 mi) north-west of Sandomierz, and 72 km (45 mi) east of the regional capital Kielce.
