= Olbierzowice =

- Village
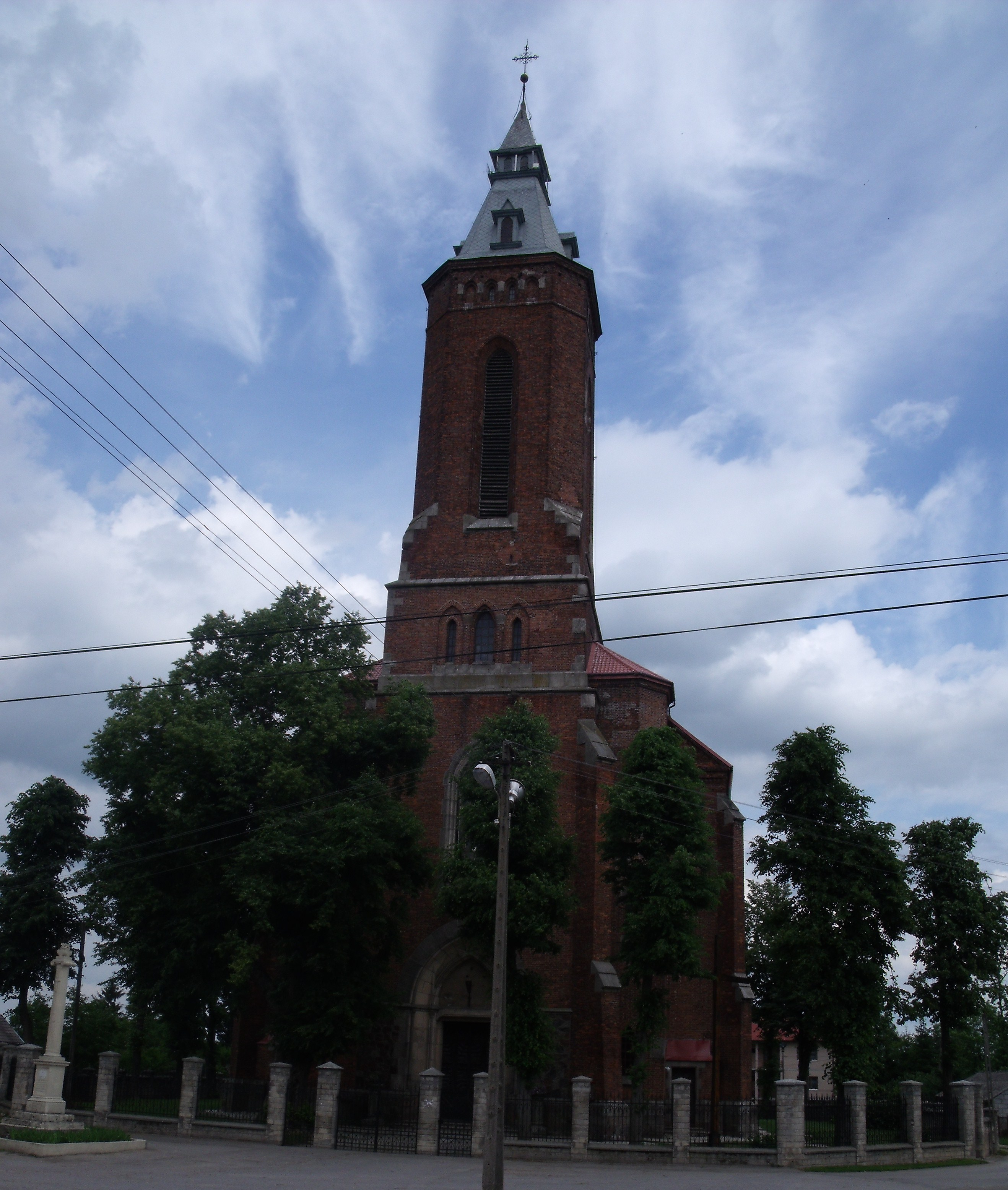
- Catholic church

- Location within Poland
- Coordinates: 50°39′26″N 21°23′27″E
- Country: Poland
- Voivodeship: Świętokrzyskie
- County: Sandomierz
- Gmina: Klimontów
- Population: 190

Olbierzowice [ɔlbjɛʐɔˈvit͡sɛ] is a village in the administrative district of Gmina Klimontów, within Sandomierz County, Świętokrzyskie Voivodeship, in south-central Poland. It lies approximately 5 km (3 mi) west of Klimontów, 26 km (16 mi) west of Sandomierz, and 60 km (37 mi) south-east of the regional capital Kielce.
