= Sucharzów =

Polish village

- Village
- Location within Poland
- Coordinates: 50°43′N 21°45′E
- Country: Poland
- Voivodeship: Świętokrzyskie
- County: Sandomierz
- Gmina: Obrazów

Sucharzów [suˈxaʐuf] is a village in the administrative district of Gmina Obrazów, within Sandomierz County, Świętokrzyskie Voivodeship, in south-central Poland. It lies approximately 9 km (6 mi) east of Obrazów, 4 km (2 mi) north of Sandomierz, and 82 km (51 mi) east of the regional capital Kielce.
