= Byszówka =

- Village
- Location within Poland
- Coordinates: 50°38′36″N 21°27′52″E
- Country: Poland
- Voivodeship: Świętokrzyskie
- County: Sandomierz
- Gmina: Klimontów

Byszówka [bɨˈʂufka] is a village in the administrative district of Gmina Klimontów, within Sandomierz County, Świętokrzyskie Voivodeship, in south-central Poland. It lies approximately 2 km (1 mi) south-east of Klimontów, 21 km (13 mi) west of Sandomierz, and 66 km (41 mi) south-east of the regional capital Kielce.
