= Ułanowice =

- Village
- Location within Poland
- Coordinates: 50°39′48″N 21°22′38″E
- Country: Poland
- Voivodeship: Świętokrzyskie
- County: Sandomierz
- Gmina: Klimontów

Ułanowice [uwanɔˈvit͡sɛ] is a village in the administrative district of Gmina Klimontów, within Sandomierz County, Świętokrzyskie Voivodeship, in south-central Poland. It lies approximately 6 km (4 mi) west of Klimontów, 27 km (17 mi) west of Sandomierz, and 59 km (37 mi) south-east of the regional capital Kielce.
