= Rożki, Świętokrzyskie Voivodeship =

Rożki
- Village
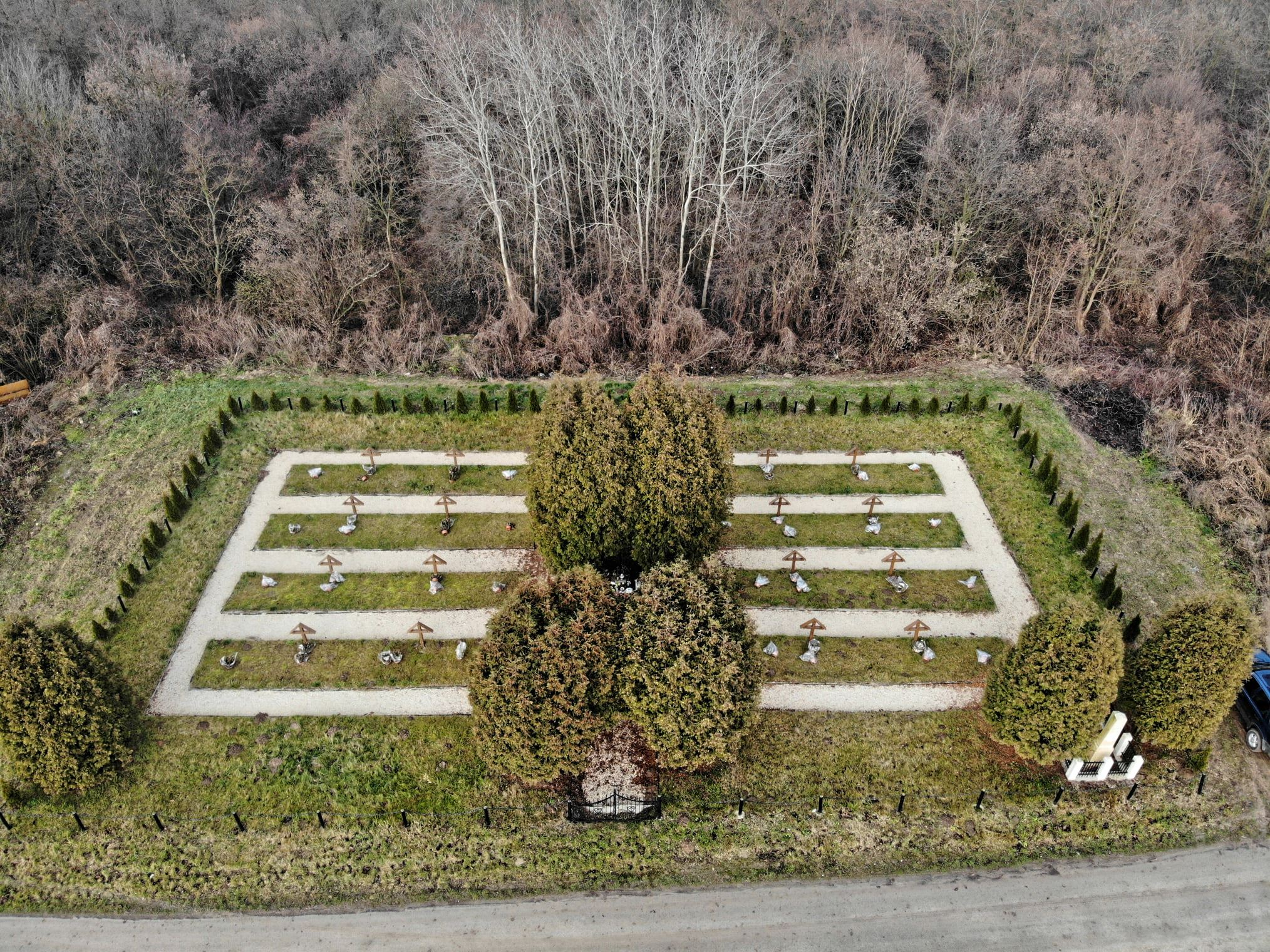
- War cemetery

- Location within Poland
- Coordinates: 50°42′30″N 21°37′42″E
- Country: Poland
- Voivodeship: Świętokrzyskie
- County: Sandomierz
- Gmina: Obrazów
- Population: 340

Rożki [ˈrɔʂki] is a village in the administrative district of Gmina Obrazów, within Sandomierz County, Świętokrzyskie Voivodeship, in south-central Poland. It lies approximately 2 km (1 mi) north of Obrazów, 10 km (6 mi) west of Sandomierz, and 74 km (46 mi) east of the regional capital Kielce.
