= Pęchowiec =

- Village
- Location within Poland
- Coordinates: 50°40′18″N 21°28′1″E
- Country: Poland
- Voivodeship: Świętokrzyskie
- County: Sandomierz
- Gmina: Klimontów

Pęchowiec [pɛ̃ˈxɔvjɛt͡s] is a village in the administrative district of Gmina Klimontów, within Sandomierz County, Świętokrzyskie Voivodeship, in south-central Poland. It lies approximately 2 km (1 mi) north-east of Klimontów, 21 km (13 mi) west of Sandomierz, and 65 km (40 mi) east of the regional capital Kielce.

== See also ==
- The Lesser Polish Way
