= Borek Klimontowski =

- Village
- Location within Poland
- Coordinates: 50°38′4″N 21°27′42″E
- Country: Poland
- Voivodeship: Świętokrzyskie
- County: Sandomierz
- Gmina: Klimontów

Borek Klimontowski [ˈbɔrɛk klimɔnˈtɔfski] is a village in the administrative district of Gmina Klimontów, within Sandomierz County, Świętokrzyskie Voivodeship, in south-central Poland. It lies approximately 3 km (2 mi) south of Klimontów, 22 km (14 mi) west of Sandomierz, and 66 km (41 mi) south-east of the regional capital Kielce.
