= Dębiany, Sandomierz County =

Dębiany
- Village
- Location within Poland
- Coordinates: 50°40′51″N 21°37′15″E
- Country: Poland
- Voivodeship: Świętokrzyskie
- County: Sandomierz
- Gmina: Obrazów
- Population: 410

Dębiany [dɛmˈbjanɨ] is a village in the administrative district of Gmina Obrazów, within Sandomierz County, Świętokrzyskie Voivodeship, in south-central Poland. It lies approximately 2 km (1 mi) south-west of Obrazów, 10 km (6 mi) west of Sandomierz, and 75 km (47 mi) east of the regional capital Kielce.
