= Wysiadłów =

- Village
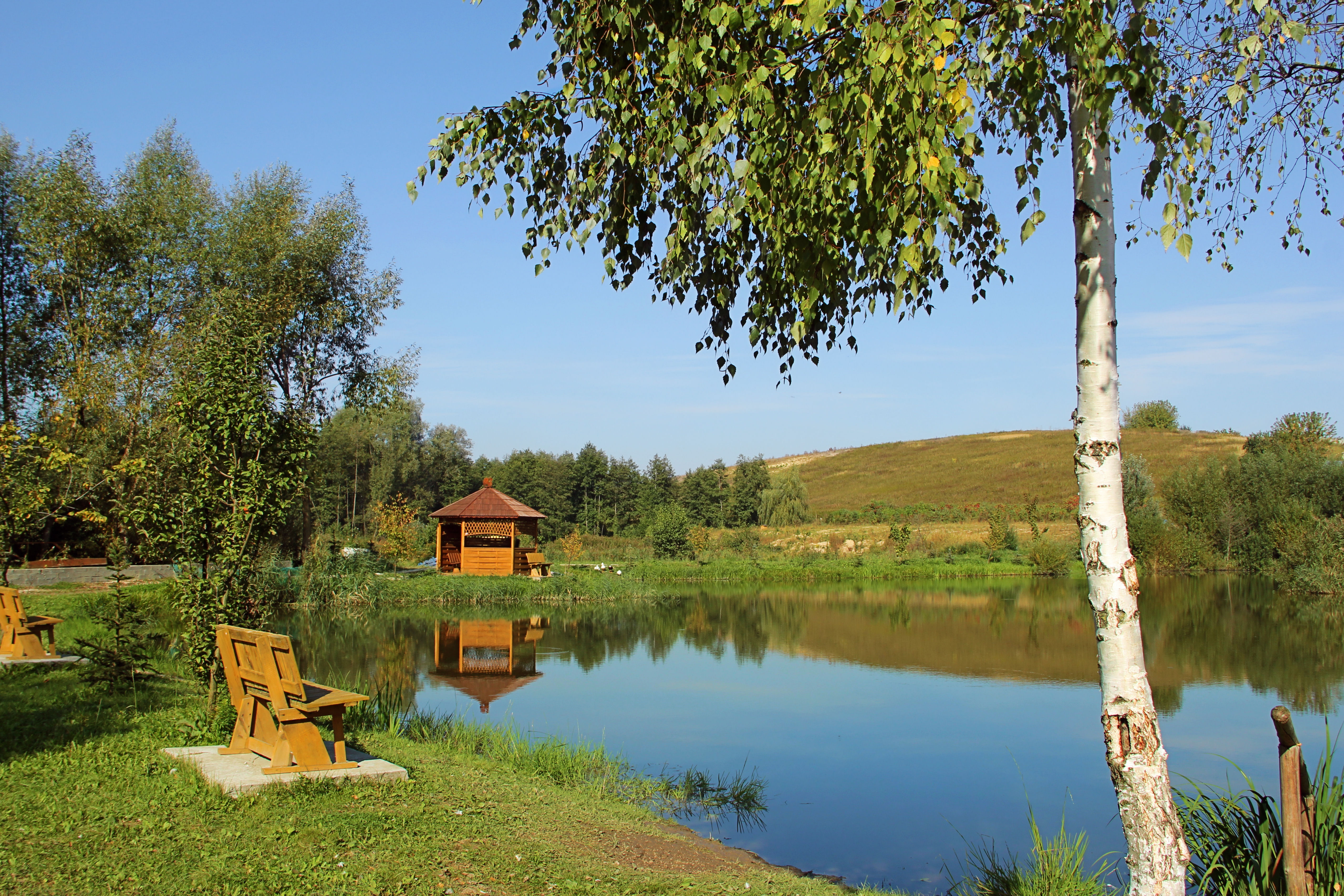

- Location within Poland
- Coordinates: 50°43′49″N 21°41′45″E
- Country: Poland
- Voivodeship: Świętokrzyskie
- County: Sandomierz
- Gmina: Wilczyce

Wysiadłów [vɨˈɕadwuf] is a village in the administrative district of Gmina Wilczyce, within Sandomierz County, Świętokrzyskie Voivodeship, in south-central Poland. It lies approximately 4 km (2 mi) south-east of Wilczyce, 7 km (4 mi) north-west of Sandomierz, and 78 km (48 mi) east of the regional capital Kielce.
