= Malice, Świętokrzyskie Voivodeship =

Malice
- Village
- Location within Poland
- Coordinates: 50°40′47″N 21°39′26″E
- Country: Poland
- Voivodeship: Świętokrzyskie
- County: Sandomierz
- Gmina: Obrazów
- Population: 310

Malice [maˈlit͡sɛ] is a village in the administrative district of Gmina Obrazów, within Sandomierz County, Świętokrzyskie Voivodeship, in south-central Poland. It lies approximately 3 km (2 mi) south-east of Obrazów, 7 km (4 mi) west of Sandomierz, and 77 km (48 mi) east of the regional capital Kielce.
