= Kępie, Sandomierz County =

Kępie
- Village
- Location within Poland
- Coordinates: 50°38′N 21°30′E
- Country: Poland
- Voivodeship: Świętokrzyskie
- County: Sandomierz
- Gmina: Klimontów

Kępie [ˈkɛmpjɛ] is a village in the administrative district of Gmina Klimontów, within Sandomierz County, Świętokrzyskie Voivodeship, in south-central Poland. It lies approximately 5 km (3 mi) southeast of Klimontów, 19 km (12 mi) west of Sandomierz, and 69 km (43 mi) south-east of the regional capital Kielce.
