= Nawodzice =

- Village
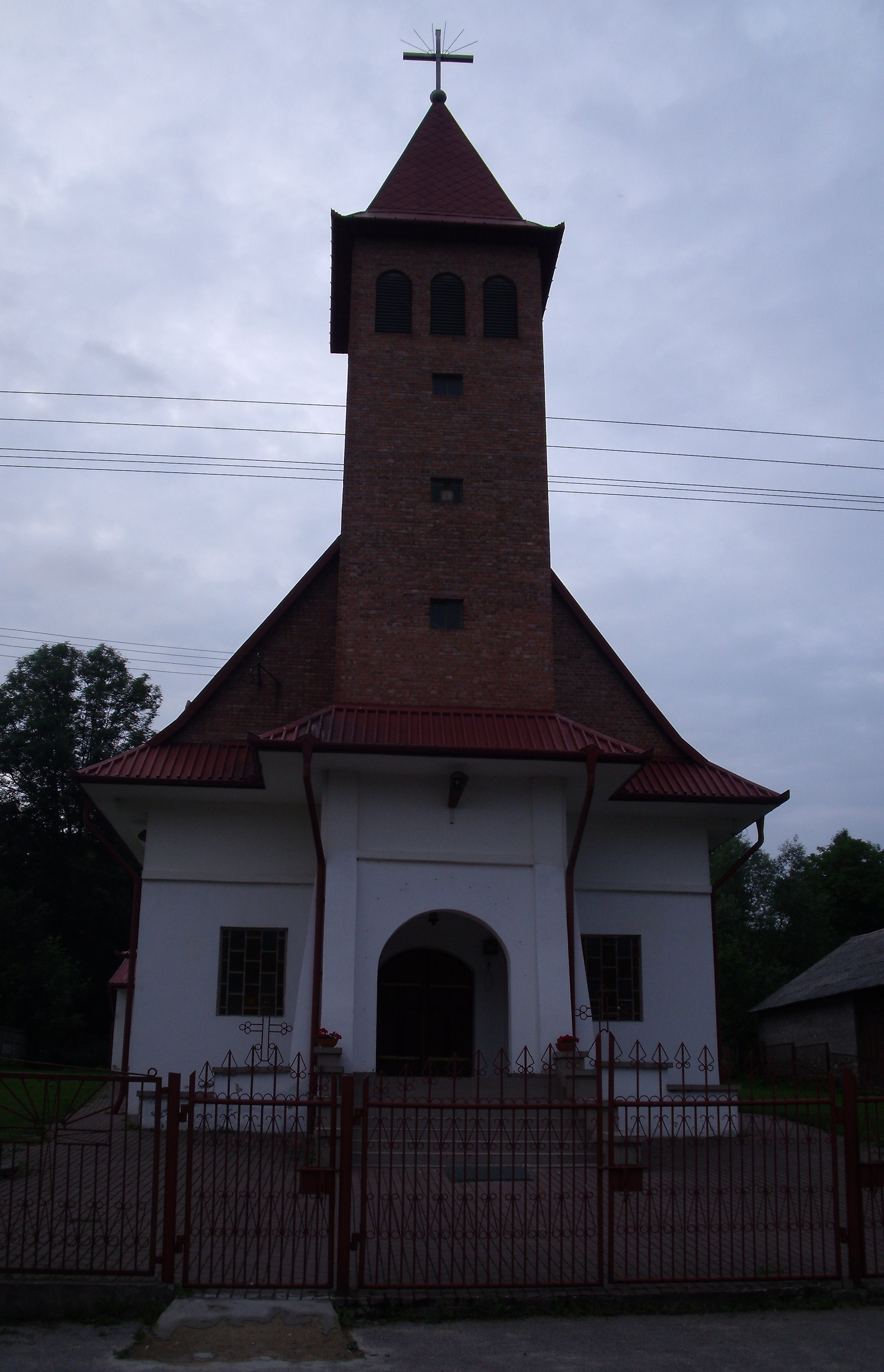
- Chapel

- Location within Poland
- Coordinates: 50°37′18″N 21°25′54″E
- Country: Poland
- Voivodeship: Świętokrzyskie
- County: Sandomierz
- Gmina: Klimontów
- Population: 650

Nawodzice [navɔˈd͡ʑit͡sɛ] is a village in the administrative district of Gmina Klimontów, within Sandomierz County, Świętokrzyskie Voivodeship, in south-central Poland. It lies approximately 5 km (3 mi) south of Klimontów, 24 km (15 mi) west of Sandomierz, and 65 km (40 mi) south-east of the regional capital Kielce.

== See also ==
- The Lesser Polish Way
