= Komorna =

- Village
- Location within Poland
- Coordinates: 50°43′13″N 21°36′7″E
- Country: Poland
- Voivodeship: Świętokrzyskie
- County: Sandomierz
- Gmina: Obrazów
- Population: 330

Komorna [kɔˈmɔrna] is a village in the administrative district of Gmina Obrazów, within Sandomierz County, Świętokrzyskie Voivodeship, in south-central Poland. It lies approximately 4 km (2 mi) north-west of Obrazów, 12 km (7 mi) west of Sandomierz, and 72 km (45 mi) east of the regional capital Kielce.
