= Góry Pęchowskie =

- Village
- Location within Poland
- Coordinates: 50°40′51″N 21°26′41″E
- Country: Poland
- Voivodeship: Świętokrzyskie
- County: Sandomierz
- Gmina: Klimontów
- Population: 60

Góry Pęchowskie [ˈɡurɨ pɛ̃ˈxɔfskʲɛ] is a village in the administrative district of Gmina Klimontów, within Sandomierz County, Świętokrzyskie Voivodeship, in south-central Poland. It lies approximately 3 km (2 mi) north of Klimontów, 22 km (14 mi) west of Sandomierz, and 63 km (39 mi) east of the regional capital Kielce.
