= Nowa Wieś, Sandomierz County =

Nowa Wieś
- Village
- Location within Poland
- Coordinates: 50°39′17″N 21°24′58″E
- Country: Poland
- Voivodeship: Świętokrzyskie
- County: Sandomierz
- Gmina: Klimontów
- Population (approx.): 470

Nowa Wieś [ˈnɔva ˈvjɛɕ] is a village in the administrative district of Gmina Klimontów, within Sandomierz County, Świętokrzyskie Voivodeship, in south-central Poland. It lies approximately 3 km (2 mi) west of Klimontów, 24 km (15 mi) west of Sandomierz, and 62 km (39 mi) south-east of the regional capital Kielce.
