= Zagrody, Sandomierz County =

Zagrody
- Village
- Location within Poland
- Coordinates: 50°44′8″N 21°37′25″E
- Country: Poland
- Voivodeship: Świętokrzyskie
- County: Sandomierz
- Gmina: Wilczyce
- Population: 140

Zagrody [zaˈɡrɔdɨ] is a village in the administrative district of Gmina Wilczyce, within Sandomierz County, Świętokrzyskie Voivodeship, in south-central Poland. It lies approximately 3 km (2 mi) south-west of Wilczyce, 11 km (7 mi) north-west of Sandomierz, and 73 km (45 mi) east of the regional capital Kielce.
