= Rogacz =

- Village
- Location within Poland
- Coordinates: 50°38′24″N 21°28′59″E
- Country: Poland
- Voivodeship: Świętokrzyskie
- County: Sandomierz
- Gmina: Klimontów
- Population: 150

Rogacz [ˈrɔɡat͡ʂ] is a village in the administrative district of Gmina Klimontów, within Sandomierz County, Świętokrzyskie Voivodeship, in south-central Poland. It lies approximately 3 km (2 mi) south-east of Klimontów, 20 km (12 mi) west of Sandomierz, and 67 km (42 mi) south-east of the regional capital Kielce.
