= Zakrzów, Sandomierz County =

Zakrzów
- Village
- Location within Poland
- Coordinates: 50°41′18″N 21°27′27″E
- Country: Poland
- Voivodeship: Świętokrzyskie
- County: Sandomierz
- Gmina: Klimontów
- Population: 290

Zakrzów [ˈzakʂuf] is a village in the administrative district of Gmina Klimontów, within Sandomierz County, Świętokrzyskie Voivodeship, in south-central Poland. It lies approximately 4 km (2 mi) north of Klimontów, 21 km (13 mi) west of Sandomierz, and 64 km (40 mi) east of the regional capital Kielce.
