= Battle of Goźlice =

Battle between Polish knights and Russian-Tatar troops

- Part of Kraków campaign of Leo I of Galicia
Date	23 February 1280
Location	Goźlice near Sandomierz
Result	Polish victory

Belligerents
Duchy of Kraków; Duchy of Sandomierz	Kingdom of Galicia–Volhynia

Commanders and leaders
Warsz; Piotr of Bogoria and Skotnik; Janusz Starż	Leo I of Galicia

Strength
Around 600	A few thousand

The Battle of Goźlice was a battle which took place on 23 February 1280 near Goźlice (not far from Koprzywnica) where the Polish knights led by the castellan of Kraków, voivodes led by Piotr of Bogoria and Skotnik and Janusz Starż defeated the Tatar-Russian troops led by the Galician-Volhynian prince Leo I of Galicia.

== Course of the battle ==
In 1279, after the death of Prince Bolesław V the Chaste, the Kraków and Sandomierz districts became the property of Prince Leszek II the Black. Taking advantage of the change of ruler, Prince Leo I of Galicia, after entering into a war with the Black Sea Tatars, led by Nogai Khan at that time, set out in 1280 onto the Lublin land, which could be invaded by plunderers, or in order to conquer it.

At the head of 6,000 troops, aided by Tatars and princes Mstislav Danilowicz of Lutsk and Vladimir Vasilkovich of Volhynia, he crossed the border near Chełm. He began the siege of Sandomierz, but most forces crossed the Vistula south of the city, heading for the Cistercian abbey in Koprzywnica. At the same time, Vladimir Vasilkovich ordered his troops to attack Osiek (one of the Russian chronicles provides information about rich loot and prisoners captured in this city).

The Ruthenians were finally defeated near Goźlice by the knights of Sandomierz and Kraków, who numbered much fewer warriors than the Ruthenian forces - about 600 armed men. On March 7, the Polish knights, led by Leszek II the Black, launched a retaliatory expedition that approached Lviv.

The army of Leszek the Black miraculously defeats the Prince of Rus, Leo, who invaded the Kingdom of Poland with a great amount of forces, sending him to Lviv, devastating Rus, and returning home with huge loot.

— Jan Długosz, Jana Długosza kanonika krakowskiego Dziejów polskich ksiąg dwanaście, T. 2, ks. 5, 6, 7, 8, s. 441

== Bibliography ==
- Z. Szameblan, Najazdy ruskie na ziemię sandomierską w XIII wieku, „Acta Universitatis Lodziensis. Folia Historica“, 36, 1989, p. 7-32.
