= Kroblice Pęchowskie =

- Village
- Location within Poland
- Coordinates: 50°40′6″N 21°28′41″E
- Country: Poland
- Voivodeship: Świętokrzyskie
- County: Sandomierz
- Gmina: Klimontów

Kroblice Pęchowskie [krɔˈblit͡sɛ pɛ̃ˈxɔfskʲɛ] is a village in the administrative district of Gmina Klimontów, within Sandomierz County, Świętokrzyskie Voivodeship, in south-central Poland. It lies approximately 3 km (2 mi) north-east of Klimontów, 20 km (12 mi) west of Sandomierz, and 66 km (41 mi) east of the regional capital Kielce.
