= Bożęcin =

Bożęcin refers to the following places in Poland:

- Bożęcin, Świętokrzyskie Voivodeship
- Bożęcin, Warmian-Masurian Voivodeship
