= Konary =

Konary may refer to:

- the battle of Konary
- Konary, Konin County in Greater Poland Voivodeship (west-central Poland)
- Konary, Rawicz County in Greater Poland Voivodeship (west-central Poland)
- Konary, Wągrowiec County in Greater Poland Voivodeship (west-central Poland)
- Konary, Strzelin County in Lower Silesian Voivodeship (south-west Poland)
- Konary, Gmina Udanin, Środa County in Lower Silesian Voivodeship (south-west Poland)
- Konary, Wołów County in Lower Silesian Voivodeship (south-west Poland)
- Konary, Inowrocław County in Kuyavian-Pomeranian Voivodeship (north-central Poland)
- Konary, Radziejów County in Kuyavian-Pomeranian Voivodeship (north-central Poland)
- Konary, Kutno County in Łódź Voivodeship (central Poland)
- Konary, Zgierz County in Łódź Voivodeship (central Poland)
- Konary, Lesser Poland Voivodeship (south Poland)
- Konary, Busko County in Świętokrzyskie Voivodeship (south-central Poland)
- Konary, Jędrzejów County in Świętokrzyskie Voivodeship (south-central Poland)
- Konary, Sandomierz County in Świętokrzyskie Voivodeship (south-central Poland)
- Konary, Grójec County in Masovian Voivodeship (east-central Poland)
- Konary, Gmina Nasielsk, Nowy Dwór County in Masovian Voivodeship (east-central Poland)
- Konary, Płock County in Masovian Voivodeship (east-central Poland)
- Konary, Przysucha County in Masovian Voivodeship (east-central Poland)
- Konary, Sochaczew County in Masovian Voivodeship (east-central Poland)
- Konary, Silesian Voivodeship (south Poland)
