= Wojciech Radoszewski =

Former Auxiliary Bishop of Kraków

- Auxiliary Bishop of Kraków; Titular Bishop of Hirina

Orders
- Consecration: by Bishop Józef Olechowski

Personal details
- Born: 1721
- Died: 1796 (aged 74–75)

Wojciech Radoszewski (1721 – 1796) was a Polish nobleman and clergyman who was an auxiliary bishop of Kraków.

== Biography ==
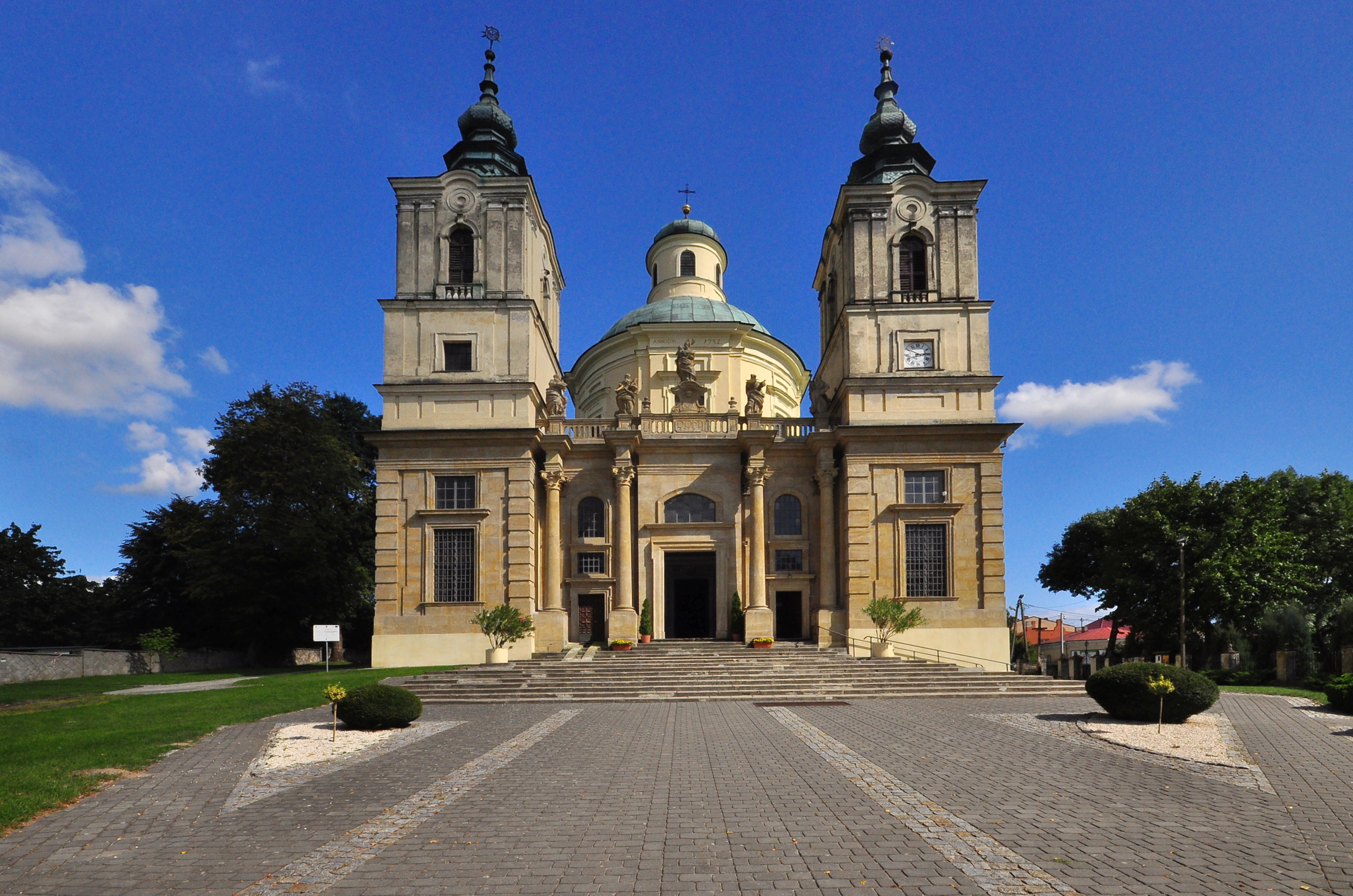
Facade of St. Joseph's Church

Radoszewski was born into a family that claimed the Oksza coat of arms. He became a priest by 1746. In 1787, he was made Auxiliary Bishop of Kraków and Titular Bishop of Hirina. In 1788, he was deputy of the Crown Tribunal.

Radoszewski also played a role in constructing St. Joseph's Church in Klimontów. He financed an organ and a baroque facade. According to historian Teodor Wierzbowski, Radoszewski also funded a parish school in Klimontów. This school was founded to the standards of the Commission of National Education, an entity that functioned as the education ministry of the Polish-Lithuanian Commonwealth.

Radoszewski died in 1796. He received the Order of Saint Stanislaus.

== See also ==
- Roman Catholic Archdiocese of Kraków
