= Bożęcin, Świętokrzyskie Voivodeship =

Bożęcin
- Village
- Location within Poland
- Coordinates: 50°47′3″N 21°38′30″E
- Country: Poland
- Voivodeship: Świętokrzyskie
- County: Sandomierz
- Gmina: Wilczyce
- Population: 80

Bożęcin [bɔˈʐɛnt͡ɕin] is a village in the administrative district of Gmina Wilczyce, within Sandomierz County, Świętokrzyskie Voivodeship, in south-central Poland. It lies approximately 5 km (3 mi) north of Wilczyce, 14 km (9 mi) north-west of Sandomierz, and 73 km (45 mi) east of the regional capital Kielce.
