= Wilkowice =

Wilkowice may refer to:

- Wilkowice, Greater Poland Voivodeship (west-central Poland)
- Wilkowice, Kuyavian-Pomeranian Voivodeship (north-central Poland)
- Wilkowice, Poddębice County in Łódź Voivodeship (central Poland)
- Wilkowice, Rawa County in Łódź Voivodeship (central Poland)
- Wilkowice, Lower Silesian Voivodeship (south-west Poland)
- Wilkowice, Bielsko County in Silesian Voivodeship (south Poland)
- Wilkowice, Świętokrzyskie Voivodeship (south-central Poland)
- Wilkowice, Tarnowskie Góry County in Silesian Voivodeship (south Poland)
- Wilkowice, West Pomeranian Voivodeship (north-west Poland)
