= Głazów =

Głazów may refer to the following places in Poland:

- Głazów, Świętokrzyskie Voivodeship
- Głazów, West Pomeranian Voivodeship
