= Tułkowice =

Tułkowice may refer to:

- Tułkowice, Podkarpackie Voivodeship, a village in Poland
- Tułkowice, Świętokrzyskie Voivodeship, a village in Poland

== See also ==
- Tolukovychi, a village in Ukraine known as Tułkowice in Polish
