= Tułkowice, Świętokrzyskie Voivodeship =

Tułkowice
- Village
- Location within Poland
- Coordinates: 50°45′N 21°38′E
- Country: Poland
- Voivodeship: Świętokrzyskie
- County: Sandomierz
- Gmina: Wilczyce

Tułkowice [tuu̯kɔˈvit͡sɛ] is a village in the administrative district of Gmina Wilczyce, within Sandomierz County, Świętokrzyskie Voivodeship, in south-central Poland. It lies approximately 2 km (1 mi) west of Wilczyce, 12 km (7 mi) north-west of Sandomierz, and 74 km (46 mi) east of the regional capital Kielce.
