= Głazów, Świętokrzyskie Voivodeship =

Głazów
- Village
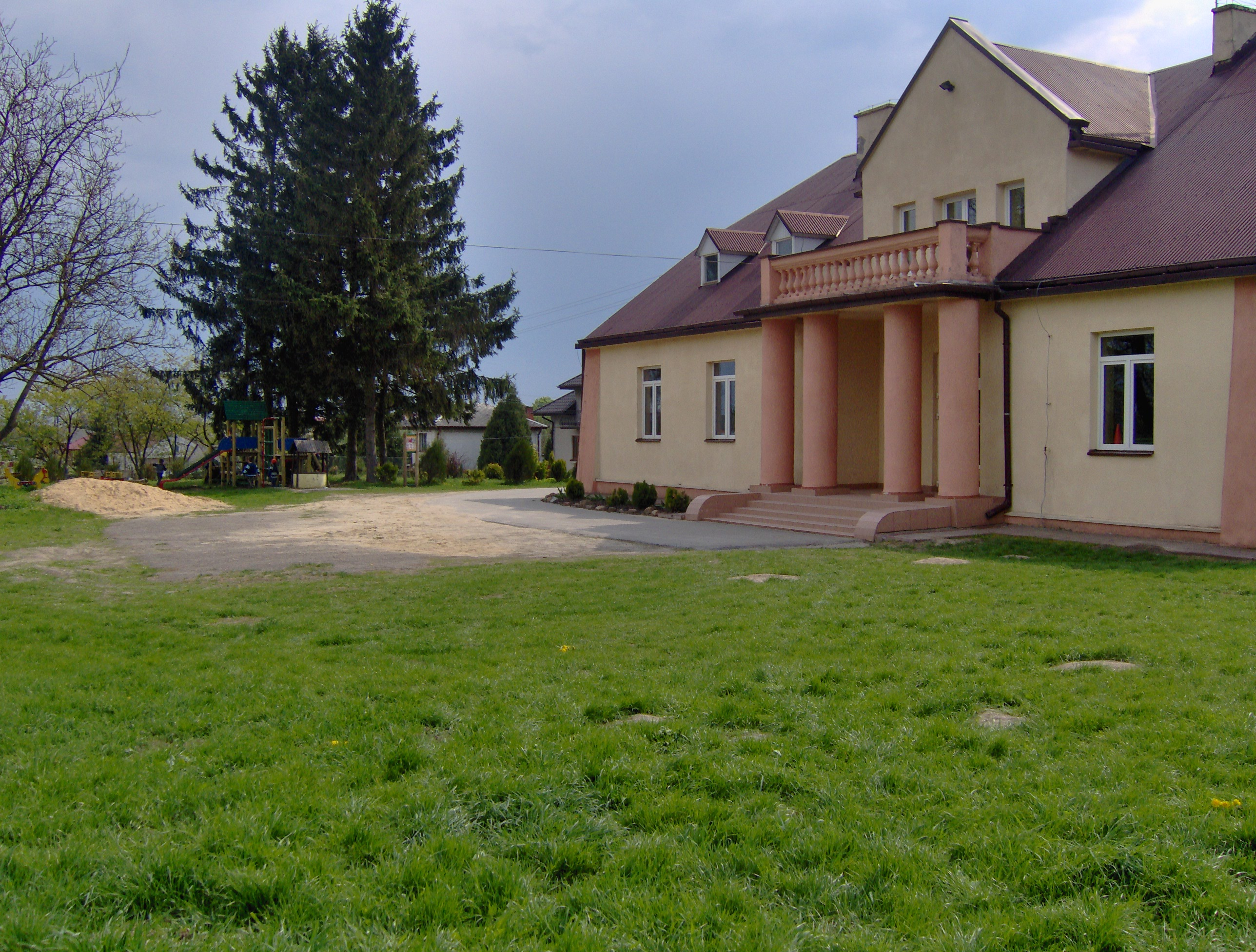

- Location within Poland
- Coordinates: 50°42′6″N 21°37′20″E
- Country: Poland
- Voivodeship: Świętokrzyskie
- County: Sandomierz
- Gmina: Obrazów
- Population: 440

Głazów [ˈɡwazuf] is a village in the administrative district of Gmina Obrazów, within Sandomierz County, Świętokrzyskie Voivodeship, in south-central Poland. It lies approximately 2 km (1 mi) north-west of Obrazów, 10 km (6 mi) west of Sandomierz, and 74 km (46 mi) east of the regional capital Kielce.
