= Radoszki, Świętokrzyskie Voivodeship =

Radoszki
- Village
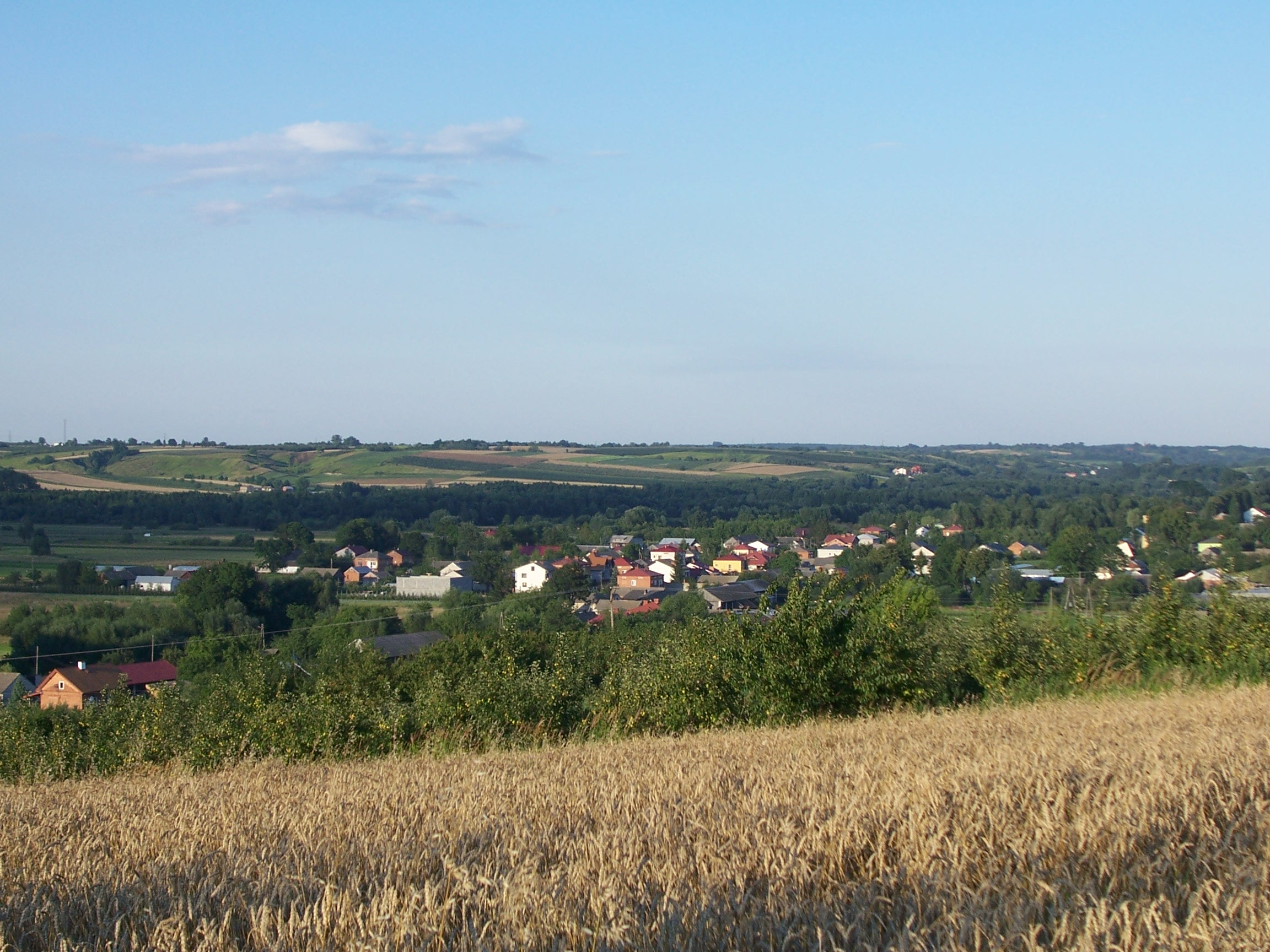

- Location within Poland
- Coordinates: 50°44′0″N 21°40′15″E
- Country: Poland
- Voivodeship: Świętokrzyskie
- County: Sandomierz
- Gmina: Wilczyce
- Population: 480

Radoszki [raˈdɔʂki] is a village in the administrative district of Gmina Wilczyce, within Sandomierz County, Świętokrzyskie Voivodeship, in south-central Poland. It lies approximately 2 km (1 mi) south-east of Wilczyce, 8 km (5 mi) north-west of Sandomierz, and 76 km (47 mi) east of the regional capital Kielce.
