= Byszów =

Byszów may refer to the following places in Poland:

- Byszów, Lower Silesian Voivodeship (south-west Poland)
- Byszów, Świętokrzyskie Voivodeship (south-central Poland)
