= Konarski =

Coat of arms of Konarski noble family

Konarski (feminine: Konarska, plural: Konarscy) is a Polish surname. The name is thought to be an occupational name, meaning "groom", or it may come from any number of places named Konary, which also comes from the Polish word for groom. The first syllable "koń" means horse.

== People ==
- Dawid Konarski (born 1989), Polish volleyball player
- Feliks Konarski (1907–1991), Polish poet, songwriter, and cabaret performer
- Janina Konarska (1900–1975), Polish artist
- Stanisław Konarski (1700–1773), Polish educational reformer
- Szymon Konarski (1808–1839), Polish revolutionary

== Institutions ==
- Konarski Secondary School in Rzeszów, one of the oldest secondary schools in Poland

== Heraldry ==
The Konarski name is associated with the following coats of arms:

- Adbank
- Gryf
- Lewart
- Nowina
- Ossorya
- Rola
- Topór
