= Dobrocice =

- Village
- Location within Poland
- Coordinates: 50°45′13″N 21°35′15″E
- Country: Poland
- Voivodeship: Świętokrzyskie
- County: Sandomierz
- Gmina: Wilczyce
- Population: 100

Dobrocice [dɔbrɔˈt͡ɕit͡sɛ] is a village in the administrative district of Gmina Wilczyce, within Sandomierz County, Świętokrzyskie Voivodeship, in south-central Poland. It lies approximately 5 km (3 mi) west of Wilczyce, 14 km (9 mi) north-west of Sandomierz, and 70 km (43 mi) east of the regional capital Kielce.
