= Nasławice, Świętokrzyskie Voivodeship =

Nasławice
- Village
- Location within Poland
- Coordinates: 50°40′24″N 21°32′4″E
- Country: Poland
- Voivodeship: Świętokrzyskie
- County: Sandomierz
- Gmina: Klimontów
- Population: 220

Nasławice [naswaˈvit͡sɛ] is a village in the administrative district of Gmina Klimontów, within Sandomierz County, Świętokrzyskie Voivodeship, in south-central Poland. It lies approximately 7 km (4 mi) east of Klimontów, 16 km (10 mi) west of Sandomierz, and 69 km (43 mi) east of the regional capital Kielce.
