= Byszów, Świętokrzyskie Voivodeship =

Byszów
- Village
- Location within Poland
- Coordinates: 50°38′36″N 21°30′30″E
- Country: Poland
- Voivodeship: Świętokrzyskie
- County: Sandomierz
- Gmina: Klimontów

Byszów [ˈbɨʂuf] is a village in the administrative district of Gmina Klimontów, within Sandomierz County, Świętokrzyskie Voivodeship, in south-central Poland. It lies approximately 5 km (3 mi) east of Klimontów, 18 km (11 mi) west of Sandomierz, and 69 km (43 mi) south-east of the regional capital Kielce.
