= Stanisław Młodożeniec =

Polish futurist

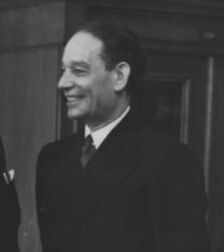
- Image of Młodożeniec at Warsaw's Folk high school, 1937. From the National Digital Archives
- Born: January 31, 1895; Dobrocice, Radom Governorate, Congress Poland
- Died: January 21, 1959 (aged 63); Warsaw, Warsaw Voivodeship, Polish People's Republic
- Resting place: Powązki Cemetery
- Education: Collegium Gostomianum
- Alma mater: Jagiellonian University
- Movement: Futurism
- Children: Jan Młodożeniec

Stanisław Młodożeniec (31 January 1895, Dobrocice – 21 January 1959, Warsaw) was a poet, and a founder of Polish futurism.

He was born to a well-to-do peasant family in 1895 in the village of Dobrocice, near Sandomierz. Captured in 1915 by the retreating Russian army, Młodożeniec was taken to Moscow where he attended the Collegium Gostomianum in order to avoid military service. After returning to Poland in 1918, he studied Polish literature at the Jagellonian University. Along with Tytus Czyżewski and Bruno Jasieński he founded the futurist club Katarynka, and participated in futurist activities. Between 1922 and 1939 he worked as a high school teacher and during the 1930s he became politically active in the peasants' party. After the war he lived in London, before returning in 1958 to Poland, where he died in 1959 in Warsaw.
