= Wierzbiny, Świętokrzyskie Voivodeship =

Wierzbiny
- Village
- Location within Poland
- Coordinates: 50°42′34″N 21°39′23″E
- Country: Poland
- Voivodeship: Świętokrzyskie
- County: Sandomierz
- Gmina: Obrazów

Wierzbiny [vjɛʐˈbinɨ] is a village in the administrative district of Gmina Obrazów, within Sandomierz County, Świętokrzyskie Voivodeship, in south-central Poland. It lies approximately 3 km (2 mi) north-east of Obrazów, 8 km (5 mi) north-west of Sandomierz, and 76 km (47 mi) east of the regional capital Kielce.
