= Wierzbiny =

Wierzbiny may refer to the following places:

- Wierzbiny, Pomeranian Voivodeship (north Poland)
- Wierzbiny, Świętokrzyskie Voivodeship (south-central Poland)
- Wierzbiny, Warmian-Masurian Voivodeship (north Poland)
