= Nasławice =

Nasławice may refer to the following places in Poland:

- Nasławice, Lower Silesian Voivodeship (south-west Poland)
- Nasławice, Świętokrzyskie Voivodeship (south-central Poland)
