= Konary, Sandomierz County =

Konary
- Village
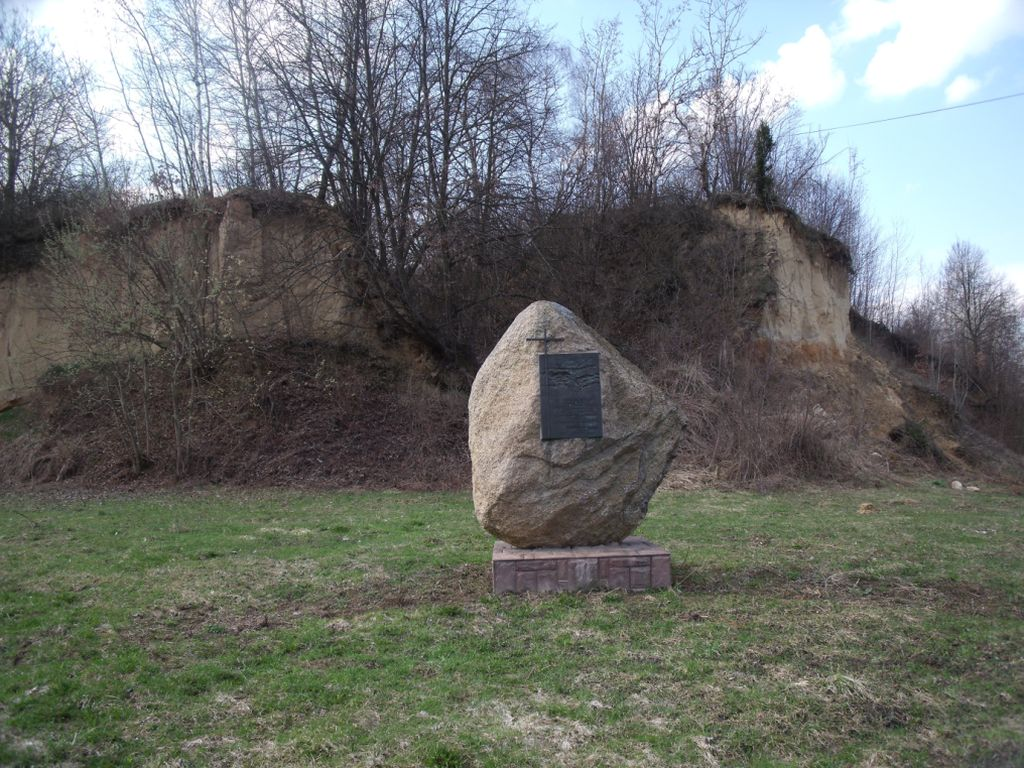
- Monument commemorating Battle of Konary

- Location within Poland
- Coordinates: 50°40′50″N 21°22′34″E
- Country: Poland
- Voivodeship: Świętokrzyskie
- County: Sandomierz
- Gmina: Klimontów

Population
  - Total: 420

Konary [kɔˈnarɨ] is a village in the administrative district of Gmina Klimontów, within Sandomierz County, Świętokrzyskie Voivodeship, in south-central Poland. It lies approximately 7 km (4 mi) north-west of Klimontów, 27 km (17 mi) west of Sandomierz, and 58 km (36 mi) south-east of the regional capital Kielce.

Battle of Konary in World War I was fought here.
