= Radoszki =

Radoszki may refer to the following places:

- Radoszki, Kuyavian-Pomeranian Voivodeship (north-central Poland)
- Radoszki, Świętokrzyskie Voivodeship (south-central Poland)
- Radoszki, West Pomeranian Voivodeship (north-west Poland)
