= Wilkowice, Świętokrzyskie Voivodeship =

Wilkowice
- Village
- Location within Poland
- Coordinates: 50°41′5″N 21°29′57″E
- Country: Poland
- Voivodeship: Świętokrzyskie
- County: Sandomierz
- Gmina: Klimontów

Wilkowice [vilkɔˈvit͡sɛ] is a village in the administrative district of Gmina Klimontów, within Sandomierz County, Świętokrzyskie Voivodeship, in south-central Poland. It lies approximately 5 km (3 mi) north-east of Klimontów, 18 km (11 mi) west of Sandomierz, and 66 km (41 mi) east of the regional capital Kielce.
