= Gmina Obrazów =

Gmina Obrazów Obrazów Commune
- Gmina
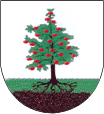
- Coat of arms

- Location within Poland
- Coordinates (Obrazów): 50°41′35″N 21°38′13″E
- Country: Poland
- Voivodeship: Świętokrzyskie
- County: Sandomierz
- Seat: Obrazów

Area
  - Total: 71.86 km^{2} (27.75 sq mi)

Population (2013)
  - Total: 6,591
  - Density: 91.72/km^{2} (237.6/sq mi)
- Website: http://www.obrazow.asi.pl

Gmina Obrazów is a rural gmina (administrative district) in Sandomierz County, Świętokrzyskie Voivodeship, in south-central Poland. Its seat is the village of Obrazów, which lies approximately 9 kilometres (6 mi) west of Sandomierz and 75 km (47 mi) east of the regional capital Kielce.

The gmina covers an area of 71.86 square kilometres (27.7 sq mi), and as of 2006 its total population is 6,715 (6,591 in 2013).

== Villages ==
Gmina Obrazów contains the villages and settlements of Bilcza, Chwałki, Dębiany, Głazów, Jugoszów, Kleczanów, Komorna, Lenarczyce, Malice, Obrazów, Piekary, Rożki, Sucharzów, Świątniki, Święcica, Węgrce Panieńskie, Wierzbiny, Zdanów and Żurawica.

== Neighbouring gminas ==
Gmina Obrazów is bordered by the town of Sandomierz and by the gminas of Dwikozy, Klimontów, Lipnik, Samborzec and Wilczyce.
