= Kraków campaign of Leo I of Galicia =

Campaign on Kraków led by Leo I of Galicia

Date	February – March 1280
Location	Goźlice, Sandomierz, Kraków, Brest
Result	Polish victory

Belligerents
Kingdom of Galicia–Volhynia	Kingdom of Poland

Commanders and leaders
Leo I of Galicia; Volodymyr Vasylkovich	Leszek the Black

Strength
6,000 troops	600 knights

The Kraków campaign of Leo I of Galicia was a campaign involving Kingdom of Galicia–Volhynia led by Leo I of Galicia against the Kingdom of Poland led by Leszek II the Black. It ended in a victory for Poland.

== Prelude ==
Leo I of Galicia had good knowledge about the situation in Poland. He could rely on the help of the Nogai, the Masovian princes Konrad and Bolesław, sons of Zemovyt as well as his son-in-law, the Bytom and Glogovo prince Kazimir and his brother, the Opole prince Bolesław, and the Czechs. This allowed him to put forward his own claims to the Kraków throne. By law, as Constantia's (?) husband, he was allowed to do this.

Although, the biggest opponents of his plans weren't the Polish king Leszek the Black nor the Hungarian king Ladislaus IV, it was Leo's brothers, Volodymyr Vasylkovich and Mstislav Danylovych.

== The campaign ==
The Volhynian troops took part in this war due to pressure. This is likely to be one of the reasons for the defeat of Leo's army near the city of Kopshivnytsia on the banks of the Kopshivyanka river, the left tributary of the Vistula near Sandomierz on the way to Kraków.

=== Battle of Goźlice ===
The battle took place on 23 February 1280. Leo I of Galicia had 6,000 troops against the 600 troops that came from Kraków and Sandomierz. He crossed the border near Chełm and then began the Siege of Sandomierz, although many of his forces crossed the Vistula south of the city. At the same time, Volodymyr Vasylkovich ordered his troops to attack Osiek.

The Ruthenians were defeated near Goźlice by the army who numbered much fewer warriors. On March 7, the Polish knights, led by Leszek the Black, launched a retaliatory expedition that approached Lviv.

Leszek the Black destroyed Perevorsk in March, although his attempt to attack Brest had failed.

== Aftermath ==
At the beginning of 1281, he managed to repel the attack of the Mongol army, which invaded Poland with the support of Leo I of Galicia.

== Bibliography ==
- Voytovych Leontiy Viktorovych: Лев Данилович, князь галицько-волинський (бл. 1225 — бл. 1301), Lviv: Institute of Ukrainian Studies named after I. Krypyakevych, National Academy of Sciences of Ukraine, pp 142–143.
- Z. Szameblan, Najazdy ruskie na ziemię sandomierską w XIII wieku, „Acta Universitatis Lodziensis. Folia Historica“, 36, 1989, pp. 7-32.
