= Battle of Konary =

Battle of WWI

Coordinates: 50°41′N 21°23′E

- Part of the Eastern Front of the World War I
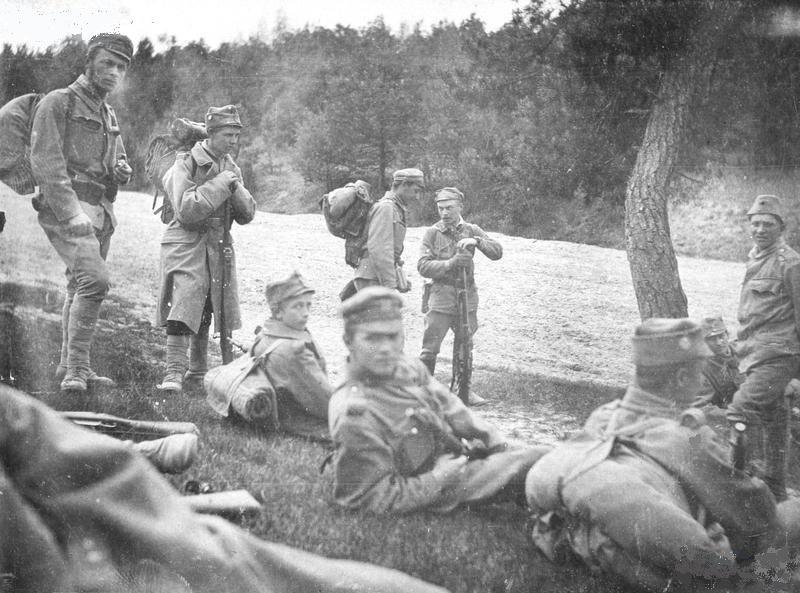
- Polish Legionnaires resting
Date	16 May – 23 June 1915
Location	Konary, Congress Poland, Russian Empire
Result	Indecisive

Belligerents
Austria-Hungary	Russian Empire

Commanders and leaders
(Austria-Hungary) Jozef Pilsudski	Alexander Ragoza

Casualties and losses
Heavy	Heavy

The battle of Konary took place during the Great War, in May and June 1915 in the Sandomierz Uplands, near the village of Konary and the town of Klimontów, Poland, between the Russian Army and the forces of Józef Piłsudski's Polish Legions. The battle started on 16 May, when the Russian 4th Army started its counter-offensive against the Central Powers in the Kingdom of Poland. The offensive was directed against the wing of the Austrian 25th Infantry Division in the area of Opatów and Klimontów. The Polish 1st Brigade was used as a stop-gap measure and held out until 23 June, when the Russian offensive was finally repelled. Both sides suffered heavy losses.
