= Goźlice =

- Village
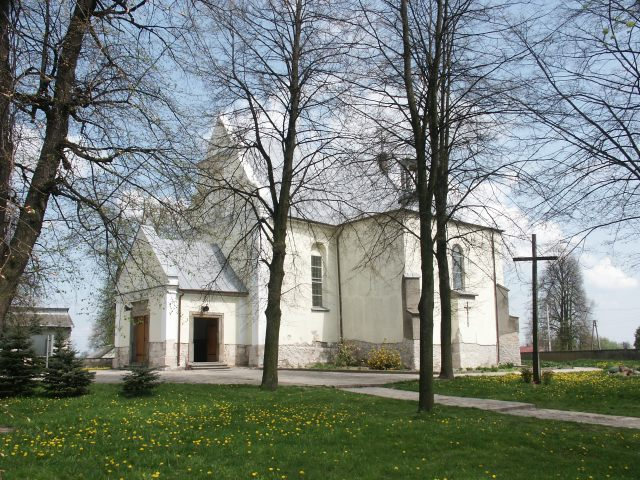
- Parish church

- Location within Poland
- Coordinates: 50°41′57″N 21°28′27″E
- Country: Poland
- Voivodeship: Świętokrzyskie
- County: Sandomierz
- Gmina: Klimontów

Goźlice [ɡɔˈʑlit͡sɛ] is a village in the administrative district of Gmina Klimontów, within Sandomierz County, Świętokrzyskie Voivodeship, in south-central Poland. It lies approximately 5 km (3 mi) north of Klimontów, 20 km (12 mi) west of Sandomierz, and 64 km (40 mi) east of the regional capital Kielce.

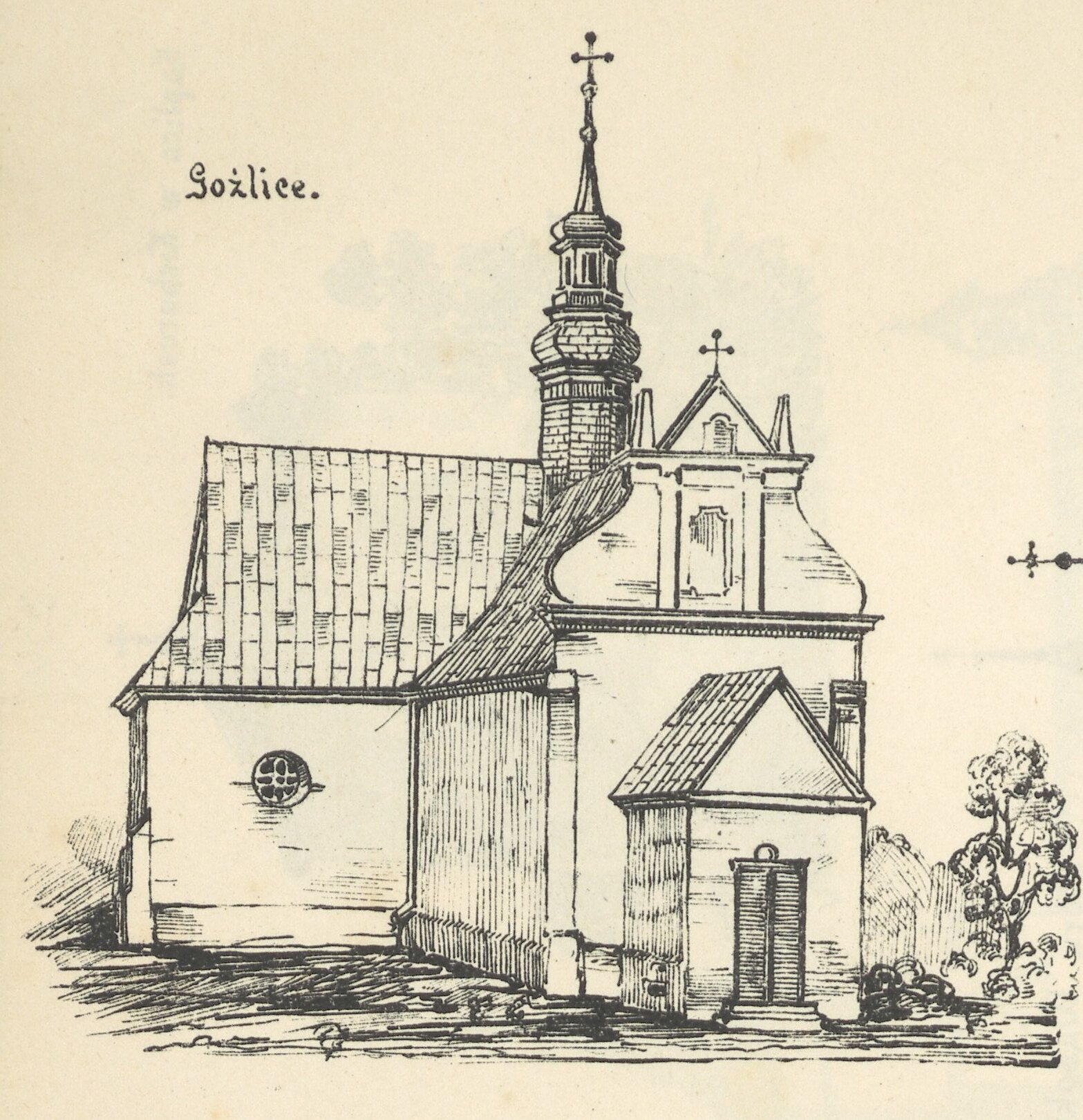
Church in Goźlice before 1915
