= St. Joseph's Church, Klimontów =

St. Joseph's Church in Klimontów
- Kościół św. Józefa w Klimontowie
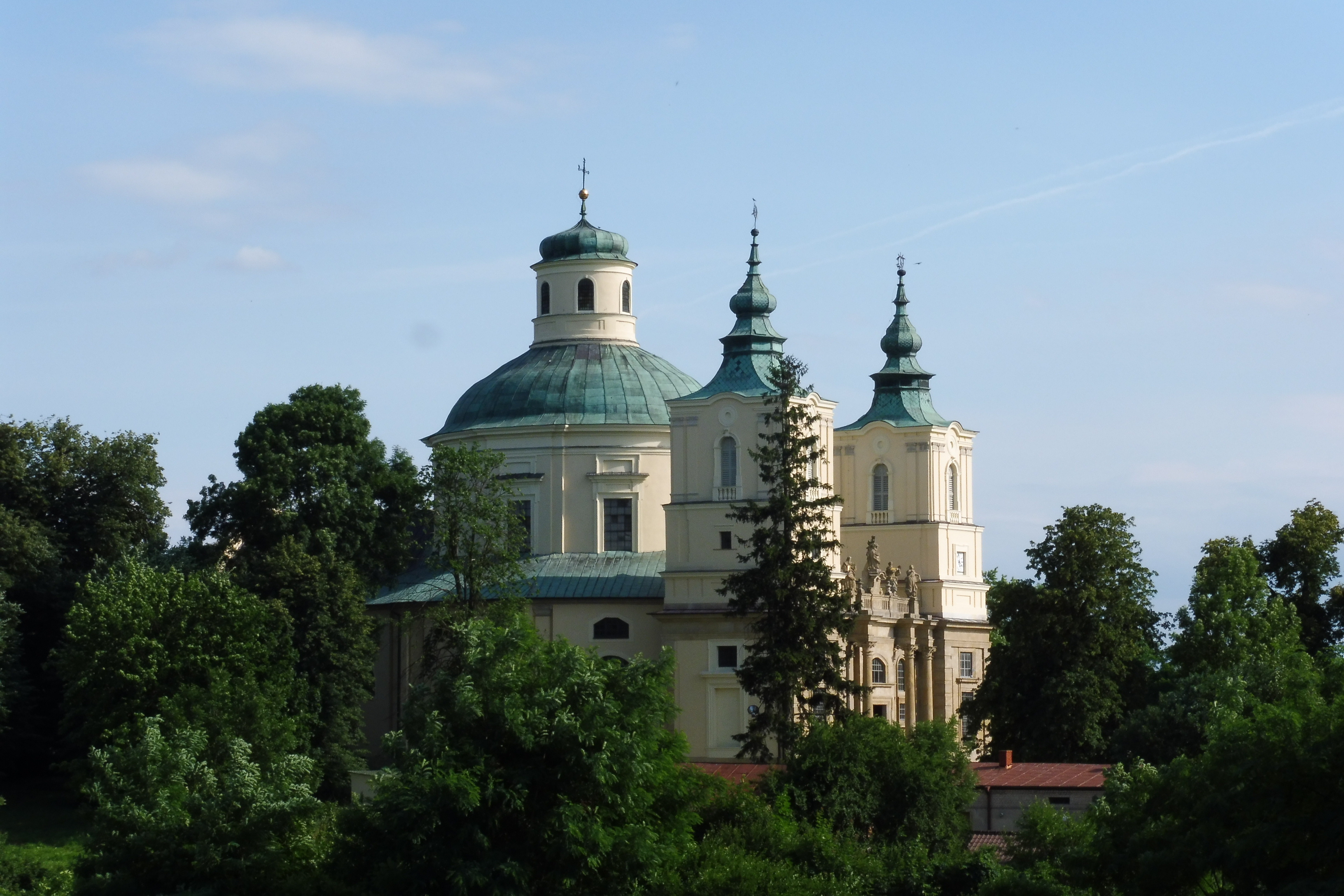
- (Credit: Krkpr)

- 50°39′27″N 21°26′55″E
- Location: Klimontów
- Country: Poland
- Denomination: Catholic

History
- Founded: 17th century

Architecture
- Heritage designation: Register of monuments
- Style: Baroque

St. Joseph's Church (Polish: Kościół św. Józefa w Klimontowie) is a Catholic church in Klimontów, Poland. It was founded by Prince Jerzy Ossoliński in the mid-17th century. Italian builder Wawrzyniec Senes designed the church. It is a registered monument in Poland.

The church is influenced by 16th century designs from Giacomo Barozzi da Vignola and Ottaviano Mascherino.

== History ==
Prince Ossoliński's plan for a church was heavily influenced by architecture that he observed during his time in Rome. He sought out an Italian architect for the designs, and construction began in the 1630s. The architect, Wawrzyniec Senes, used designs from Vignola that were initially meant for the Church of the Gesù.

In 1648, the church was made a collegiate church by Piotr Gembicki, the Bishop of Krakow.

By the 1650s, construction was still underway, but the church was heavily damaged during the Swedish invasion of Poland. During the 18th century, several people were involved with the rebuilding of the church, including Bishop Wojciech Radoszewski, Reverend Walenty Boxa Radoszewski, Helena Morsztyn, and Jakub Morsztyn.

It is a parish church in the modern period.

== Architecture ==
The church is a notable example of Baroque architecture in Poland. The rare elliptical nave is a product of the church's earlier Italian influences. The nave is domed, with two towers flanking the facade. Corinthian columns and arcades support the dome. Connected to the nave is a rectangular chancel. The main rococo altar features a painting of the patron saint.

== Notable burials ==
- Jerzy Ossoliński, the founder
