= Gmina Klimontów =

Gmina Klimontów Klimontów Commune
- Gmina
- Coat of arms

- Location within Poland
- Coordinates (Klimontów): 50°39′23″N 21°27′10″E
- Country: Poland
- Voivodeship: Świętokrzyskie
- County: Sandomierz
- Seat: Klimontów

Area
  - Total: 99.24 km^{2} (38.32 sq mi)

Population (2013)
  - Total: 8,432
  - Density: 84.97/km^{2} (220.1/sq mi)
- Website: http://klimontow.pl

Gmina Klimontów is an urban-rural gmina (administrative district) in Sandomierz County, Świętokrzyskie Voivodeship, in south-central Poland. Its seat is the town of Klimontów, which lies approximately 22 kilometres (14 mi) west of Sandomierz and 65 km (40 mi) south-east of the regional capital Kielce.

The gmina covers an area of 99.24 square kilometres (38.3 sq mi), and as of 2006 its total population is 8,628 (8,432 in 2013).

== Villages ==
Gmina Klimontów contains the villages and settlements of Adamczowice, Beradz, Borek Klimontowski, Byszów, Byszówka, Dziewków, Górki, Góry Pęchowskie, Goźlice, Grabina, Jantoniów, Kępie, Klimontów, Konary, Konary-Kolonia, Krobielice, Kroblice Pęchowskie, Nasławice, Nawodzice, Nowa Wieś, Olbierzowice, Ossolin, Pęchów, Pęchowiec, Płaczkowice, Pokrzywianka, Przybysławice, Rogacz, Rybnica, Śniekozy, Szymanowice Dolne, Szymanowice Górne, Ułanowice, Węgrce Szlacheckie, Wilkowice and Zakrzów.

== Neighbouring gminas ==
Gmina Klimontów is bordered by the gminas of Bogoria, Iwaniska, Koprzywnica, Lipnik, Łoniów, Obrazów, Samborzec and Staszów.
