= Gmina Wilczyce =

Gmina Wilczyce Wilczyce Commune
- Gmina
- Coat of arms

- Location within Poland
- Coordinates (Wilczyce): 50°44′50″N 21°39′22″E
- Country: Poland
- Voivodeship: Świętokrzyskie
- County: Sandomierz
- Seat: Wilczyce

Area
  - Total: 69.94 km^{2} (27.00 sq mi)

Population (2013)
  - Total: 3,800
  - Density: 54/km^{2} (140/sq mi)
- Website: http://www.wilczyce.pl

In south-central Poland, Gmina Wilczyce is a rural gmina (administrative district) in Sandomierz County, Świętokrzyskie Voivodeship. Its seat is the village of Wilczyce, which lies approximately 10 kilometres (6 mi) northwest of Sandomierz and 75 km (47 mi) east of the regional capital Kielce.

The gmina covers an area of 69.94 square kilometres (27.0 sq mi); as of 2006, its total population is 3,928 (3,800 in 2013).

== Villages ==
Gmina Wilczyce contains the villages and settlements of Bożęcin, Bugaj, Dacharzów, Daromin, Dobrocice, Gałkowice-Ocin, Łukawa, Ocinek, Pęczyny, Pielaszów, Przezwody, Radoszki, Tułkowice, Wilczyce, Wysiadłów and Zagrody.

== Neighbouring gminas ==
Gmina Wilczyce is bordered by the gminas of Dwikozy, Lipnik, Obrazów, Ożarów and Wojciechowice.
