= Battle of Rybnica =

- Part of the January Uprising
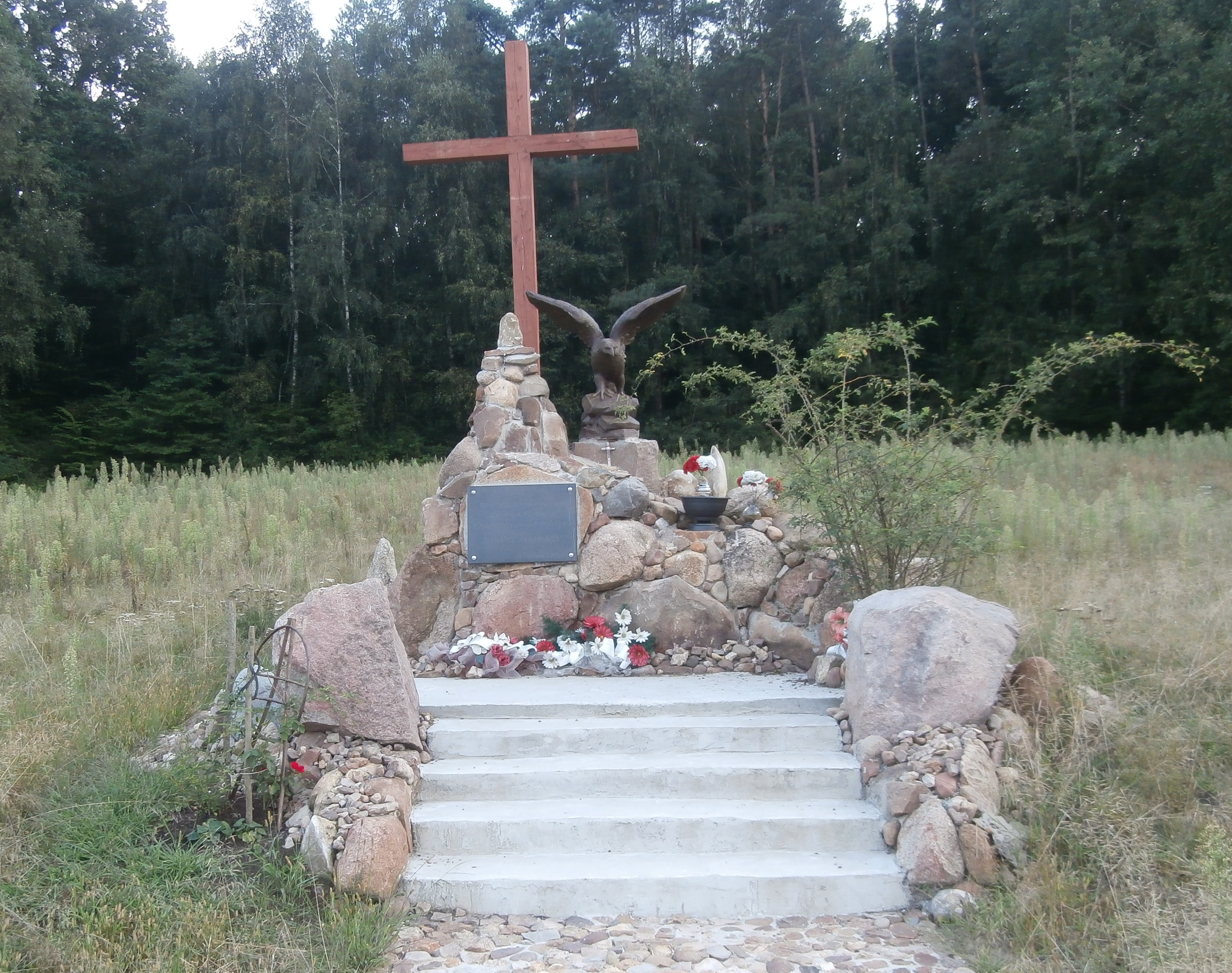
- Memorial at the site of the battle
Date	20 October 1863
Location	Rybnica
Result	Polish victory

Belligerents
(Poland) Polish insurgents	Russian Empire

Commanders and leaders
Dionizy Czachowski	Major Chuti

Strength
500 infantry and 150 cavalrymen	500

Casualties and losses
	40 dead and nearly 40 wounded

The Battle of Rybnica, one of many clashes of the January Uprising, took place on October 20, 1863, near the village of Rybnica, which at that time belonged to Russian-controlled Congress Poland. A party of 650 Polish insurgents, commanded by Dionizy Czachowski, clashed with a 500-strong detachment of the Imperial Russian Army. The clash ended in rebel victory; Russian losses were estimated at app. 50–60 killed, while the Poles lost 27 killed and 30 wounded.

== Background ==
On October 20, Czachowski and his party crossed the Vistula river, and headed northwards. News of the insurgent unit presence reached the town of Staszów, in which stationed a Russian garrison of infantry and dragoons. Russian commandant, Major Chuti, decided to set a trap for the marching insurgents, near the village of Rybnica, where the road went along the bottom of a valley. The Russians took positions on the top of a hill, at the edge of a forest.

== The battle ==
The Russian attack began at app. 3 p.m., when Cossacks shot at insurgent cavalry. Polish commanders managed to prevent panic among their ranks, and soon afterwards, insurgent infantry supported by scythemen attacked Russian soldiers. Due to Polish pressure, Cossacks had to withdraw across a river, where many drowned.

== Aftermath ==
The skirmish lasted for some 90 minutes, after which Russians retreated northwards. Their commandant, Major Chuti, did not give up, and on the next day attacked the insurgents at Jurkowice.

== Sources ==
- Stefan Kieniewicz: Powstanie styczniowe. Warszawa: Państwowe Wydawnictwo Naukowe, 1983. ISBN 83-01-03652-4.
