= Wilczyce, Świętokrzyskie Voivodeship =

Wilczyce
- Village
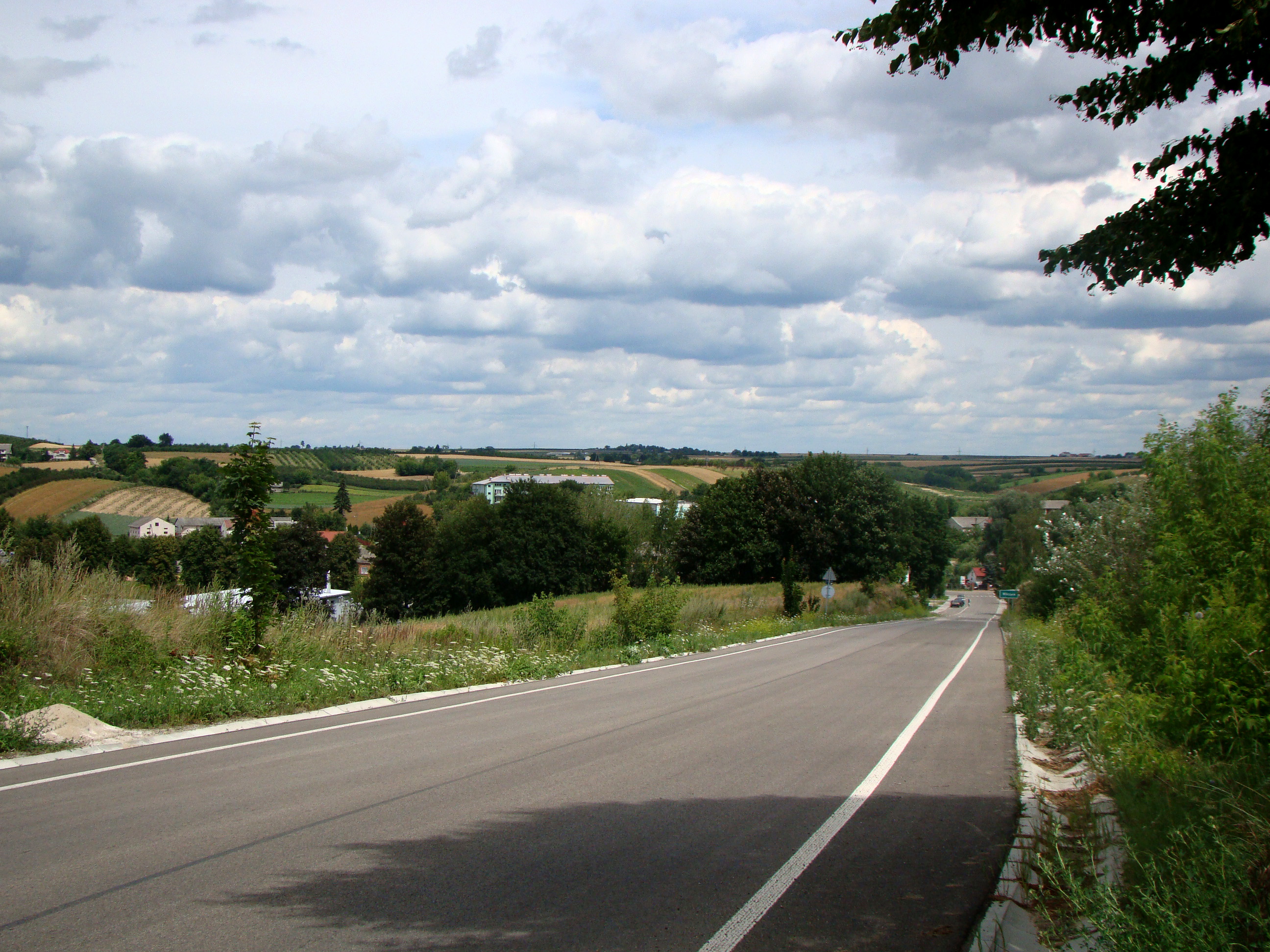

- Coat of arms

- Location within Poland
- Coordinates: 50°44′50″N 21°39′22″E
- Country: Poland
- Voivodeship: Świętokrzyskie
- County: Sandomierz
- Gmina: Wilczyce
- Population: 830

Wilczyce [vilˈt͡ʂɨt͡sɛ] is a village in Sandomierz County, Świętokrzyskie Voivodeship, in south-central Poland. It is the seat of the gmina (administrative district) called Gmina Wilczyce. It lies approximately 10 km (6 mi) north-west of Sandomierz and 75 km (47 mi) east of the regional capital Kielce.
