= Obrazów =

- Village
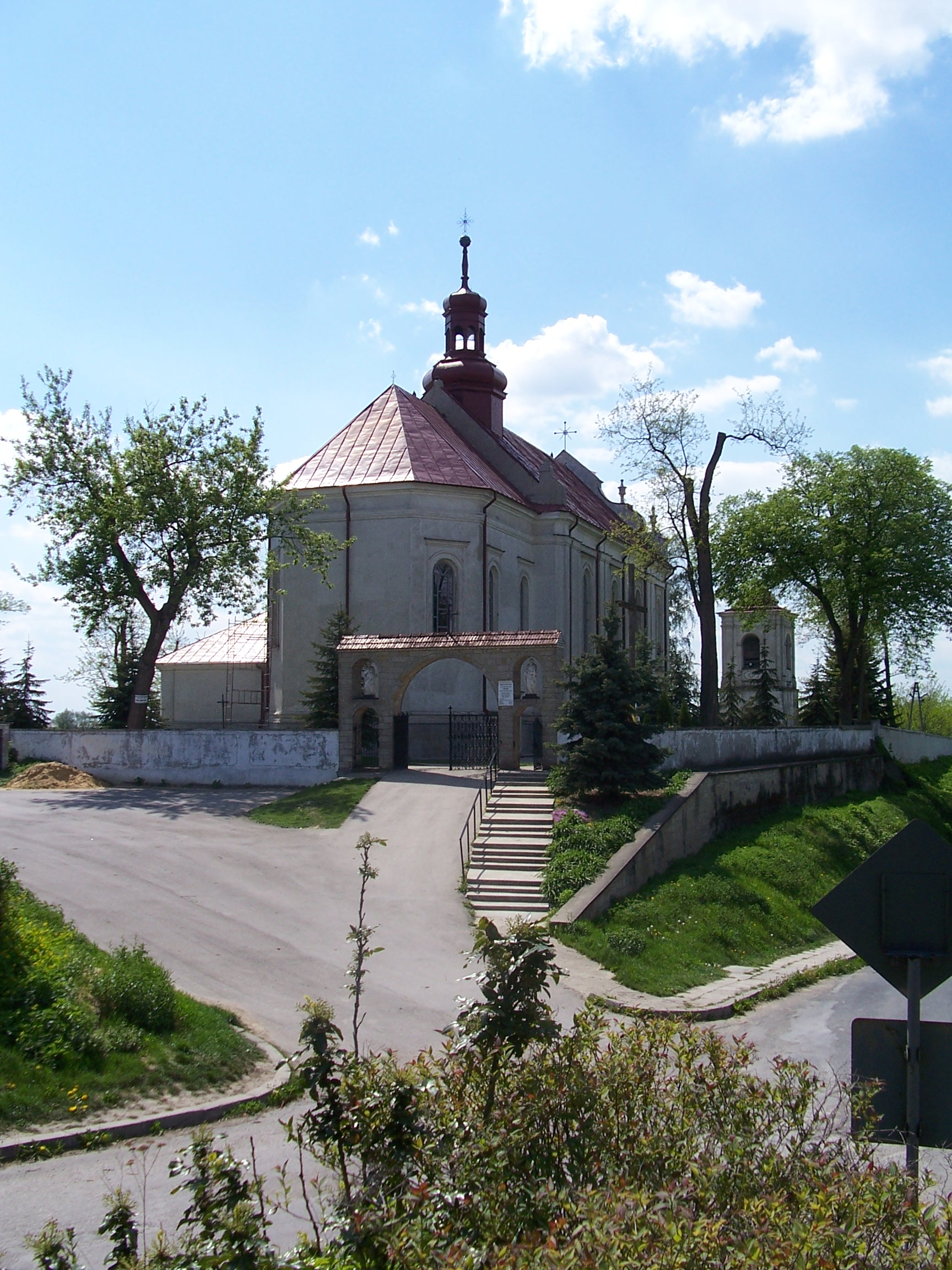
- Saint Peter and Paul Church

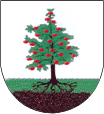
- Coat of arms

- Location within Poland
- Coordinates: 50°41′35″N 21°38′13″E
- Country: Poland
- Voivodeship: Świętokrzyskie
- County: Sandomierz
- Gmina: Obrazów

Obrazów [ɔˈbrazuf] is a village in Sandomierz County, Świętokrzyskie Voivodeship, in south-central Poland. It is the seat of the gmina (administrative district) called Gmina Obrazów. It lies approximately 9 km (6 mi) west of Sandomierz and 75 km (47 mi) east of the regional capital Kielce.
