= Klimontów, Sandomierz County =

Klimontów
- Town
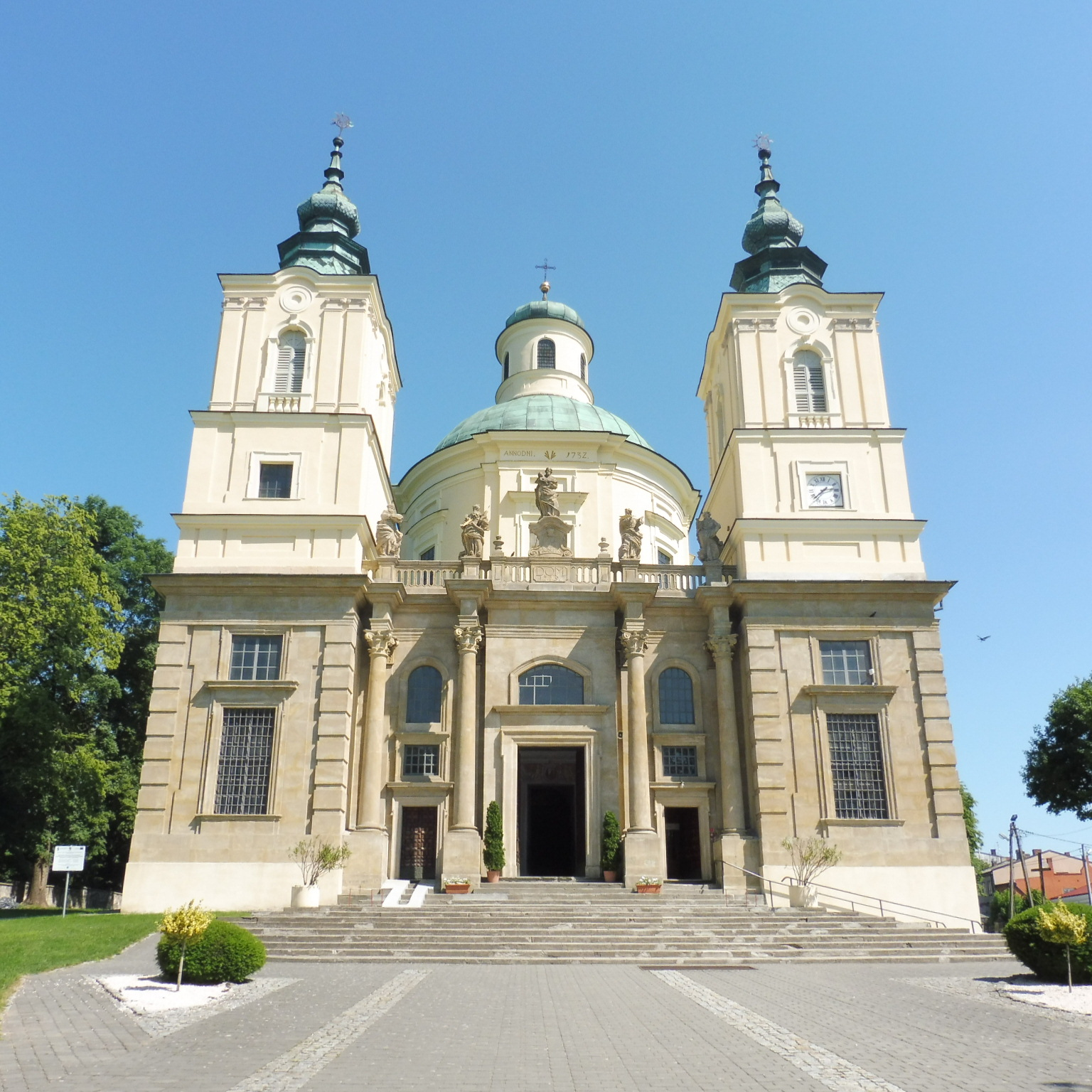
- St. Joseph's Church, Klimontów

- Coat of arms

- Location within Poland
- Coordinates: 50°39′23″N 21°27′10″E
- Country: Poland
- Voivodeship: Świętokrzyskie
- County: Sandomierz
- Gmina: Klimontów
- Founded: 13th century
- Town rights: 1604

Population
  - Total: 2,000
- Time zone: UTC+1 (CET)
  - Summer (DST): UTC+2 (CEST)
- Vehicle registration: TSA
- Website: http://klimontow.pl/

Klimontów [kliˈmɔntuf] is a town in Sandomierz County, Świętokrzyskie Voivodeship, in south-central Poland. It is the seat of the gmina (administrative district) called Gmina Klimontów. It lies on the European route E371, and along the Lesser Polish Way, approximately 22 km (14 mi) west of Sandomierz and 65 km (40 mi) south-east of the regional capital Kielce. The village has a population of 2,000. Klimontów belongs to historic Lesser Poland.

== History ==
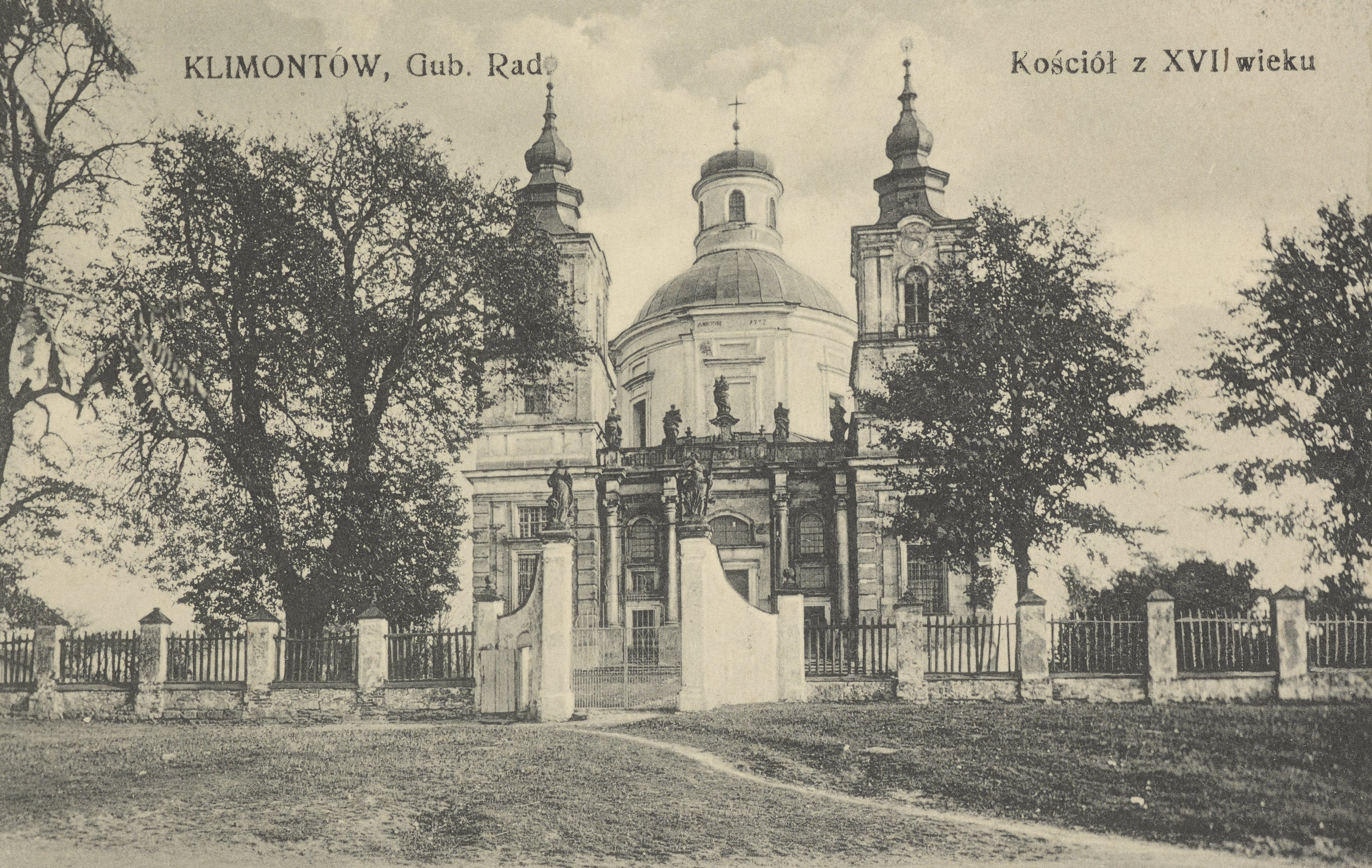
Saint Joseph Church in 1911

The origins of Klimontów date back to the 13th century, when it was founded as village by Klement of Ruszcza. On January 2, 1604, thanks to efforts of Jan Zbigniew Ossolinski, it got a town charter. Administratively, it was located in the Sandomierz Voivodeship in the Lesser Poland Province of the Kingdom of Poland. In 1613 the town was granted a permission to organize 3 fairs a year, and two years later, the construction of a Dominican abbey was completed. In 1643-1646, a collegiate church was built, with financial support of Jerzy Ossolinski. By 1663, Klimontów had 24 houses and 530 inhabitants, including 129 Jews.

Following the Third Partition of Poland, in 1795, it was annexed by Austria. It was regained by Poles following the Austro-Polish War of 1809 and included within the short-lived Duchy of Warsaw, and after its dissolution in 1815, it became part of Russian-controlled Congress Poland. In 1827, the population was 1,314. Like several other locations in northern Lesser Poland, Klimontów lost its town charter after the January Uprising, in 1870. During World War I, in 1914 and 1915, there were bloody battles in the region between Austrian and Russian troops. Fallen Austrian soldiers were buried at a local parish cemetery. Following the war, in 1918, Poland regained independence and control of the settlement. It had 6,000 inhabitants in 1921, but in 1939 it dropped to 4,500.

Following the joint German-Soviet invasion of Poland, which started World War II in September 1939, Klimontów was occupied by Germany. From 1941 to 1944, the occupiers operated a forced labour camp in the settlement. The Polish resistance movement was active in the town, and on March 4, 1943, the Jędrusie organization seized the German warehouses located in the abbey. After the German atrocities and extermination of the Jewish population, the number of inhabitants fell to 2,200 by 1946.

On January 1, 2020, town rights were restored.

== Sights ==
Among points of interest there are: Baroque collegiate church of St. Joseph (1643-1646), St. Jack church (1617-1620), Dominican abbey (1620-1623), neo-classicistic synagogue (1851), and Roman Catholic cemetery (1843).

== Culture ==
Klimontów was the birthplace of poet Bruno Jasieński. Since 2002 the Brunonalia festival, named after Jasieński, is held every summer in Klimontów.

== See also ==
- Lesser Polish Way
