= Sandomierz County =

Sandomierz County Powiat sandomierski
- County
- Flag Coat of arms

- Location within the voivodeship
- Coordinates (Sandomierz): 50°41′N 21°45′E
- Country: Poland
- Voivodeship: Świętokrzyskie
- Seat: Sandomierz
- Gminas: Total 9 (incl. 1 urban): Sandomierz; Gmina Dwikozy; Gmina Klimontów; Gmina Koprzywnica; Gmina Łoniów; Gmina Obrazów; Gmina Samborzec; Gmina Wilczyce; Gmina Zawichost

Area
  - Total: 675.89 km^{2} (260.96 sq mi)

Population (2019)
  - Total: 77,352
  - Density: 114.44/km^{2} (296.41/sq mi)
  - Urban: 27,735
  - Rural: 49,617
- Car plates: TSA
- Website: www.powiat.sandomierz.pl

Sandomierz County (Polish: powiat sandomierski) is a unit of territorial administration and local government (powiat) in Świętokrzyskie Voivodeship, south-central Poland. It came into being on January 1, 1999, as a result of the Polish local government reforms passed in 1998. Its administrative seat and largest town is Sandomierz, which lies 83 kilometres (52 mi) east of the regional capital Kielce. The county also contains the towns of Koprzywnica, lying 16 km (10 mi) south-west of Sandomierz, and Zawichost, 16 km (10 mi) north-east of Sandomierz.

The county covers an area of 675.89 square kilometres (261.0 sq mi). As of 2019 its total population is 77,352, out of which the population of Sandomierz is 23,494, that of Koprzywnica is 2,470, that of Zawichost is 1,771, and the rural population is 49,617.

== Neighbouring counties ==
Sandomierz County is bordered by Kraśnik County to the north-east, Stalowa Wola County to the east, the city of Tarnobrzeg and Tarnobrzeg County to the south, and Staszów County and Opatów County to the west.

== Administrative divisions ==
The county is subdivided into nine gminas (one urban, two urban-rural and six rural). These are listed in the following table, in descending order of population.

| Gmina | Type | Area (km^{2}) | Population (2019) | Seat |
|---|---|---|---|---|
| Sandomierz | urban | 28.8 | 23,494 | |
| Gmina Dwikozy | rural | 84.8 | 8,727 | Dwikozy |
| Gmina Samborzec | rural | 85.4 | 8,493 | Samborzec |
| Gmina Klimontów | urban-rural | 99.2 | 8,036 | Klimontów |
| Gmina Łoniów | rural | 87.0 | 7,440 | Łoniów |
| Gmina Koprzywnica | urban-rural | 69.2 | 6,657 | Koprzywnica |
| Gmina Obrazów | rural | 71.9 | 6,376 | Obrazów |
| Gmina Zawichost | urban-rural | 80.2 | 4,435 | Zawichost |
| Gmina Wilczyce | rural | 69.9 | 3,694 | Wilczyce |

== History of the area ==
The recorded history of the Sandomierz County area dates back to the mid-14th century, when King Kazimierz Wielki (reigned 1333–1370) reformed the territorial structure of Poland. Since Sandomierz had already been one of the most important cities of the kingdom, and the seat of a castellan, the castellany was replaced by a county. Until the first partition of Poland in 1772 Sandomierz County had the area of 6290 sq. kilometers. Stretched along both banks of the Vistula, in 1667 it included such towns, as Opatow, Polaniec, Staszow, Wachock, Rudnik nad Sanem, Zawichost, Nowa Slupia, Mielec and Ozarow.

Sandomierz County also formed part of the Duchy of Warsaw, of Russian-controlled Congress Poland (as part of the Radom Governorate), and of the Second Polish Republic (as part of the Kielce Voivodeship (1919–39)).
