= Gmina Szczucin =

Gmina Szczucin Szczucin Commune
- Gmina
- Coat of arms
- Interactive map of Gmina Szczucin
- Coordinates (Szczucin): 50°18′N 21°4′E
- Country: Poland
- Voivodeship: Lesser Poland
- County: Dąbrowa
- Seat: Szczucin

Area
  - Total: 119.83 km^{2} (46.27 sq mi)

Population (2006)
  - Total: 13,369
  - Density: 111.57/km^{2} (288.96/sq mi)
- Website: http://www.szczucin.pl

Gmina Szczucin is an urban-rural gmina (administrative district) in Dąbrowa County, Lesser Poland Voivodeship, in southern Poland. Its seat is the town of Szczucin, which lies approximately 16 kilometres (10 mi) north of Dąbrowa Tarnowska and 85 km (53 mi) east of the regional capital Kraków. (Szczucin gained town status on 1 January 2009 – prior to that the district was classed as a rural gmina.)

The gmina covers an area of 119.83 square kilometres (46.3 sq mi), and as of 2006 its total population is 13,369.

== Villages ==
Apart from the town of Szczucin, the gmina contains the villages and settlements of Borki, Brzezówka, Czajków, Dąbrowica, Delastowice, Kąty, Kępa, Łabuzówka, Laskówka Delastowska, Lechówka, Łęka Szczucińska, Lubasz, Maniów, Podlesie, Podradwanie, Radwan, Rynek, Skrzynka, Słupiec, Suchy Grunt, Świdrówka, Wieżyce, Wola Szczucińska, Zabrnie, Zakępie, Zalesie and Załuże.

== Neighbouring gminas ==
Gmina Szczucin is bordered by the gminas of Czermin, Dąbrowa Tarnowska, Łubnice, Mędrzechów, Pacanów, Radgoszcz and Wadowice Górne.
