= Dąbrówka Gorzycka =

- Village
- Location within Poland
- Coordinates: 50°12′21″N 20°52′21″E
- Country: Poland
- Voivodeship: Lesser Poland
- County: Dąbrowa
- Gmina: Olesno

Dąbrówka Gorzycka [dɔmˈbrufka ɡɔˈʐɨt͡ska] is a village in the administrative district of Gmina Olesno, within Dąbrowa County, Lesser Poland Voivodeship, in southern Poland.
