= Gruszów Mały =

- Village
- Location within Poland
- Coordinates: 50°12′N 21°1′E
- Country: Poland
- Voivodeship: Lesser Poland
- County: Dąbrowa
- Gmina: Dąbrowa Tarnowska

Gruszów Mały [ˈɡruʂuf ˈmawɨ] is a village in the administrative district of Gmina Dąbrowa Tarnowska, within Dąbrowa County, Lesser Poland Voivodeship, in southern Poland.
