= Pawłów, Lesser Poland Voivodeship =

Pawłów
- Village
- Location within Poland
- Coordinates: 50°17′33″N 20°53′13″E
- Country: Poland
- Voivodeship: Lesser Poland
- County: Dąbrowa
- Gmina: Bolesław

Pawłów [ˈpavwuf] is a village in the administrative district of Gmina Bolesław, within Dąbrowa County, Lesser Poland Voivodeship, in southern Poland.
