= Wielopole, Dąbrowa County =

Wielopole
- Village
- Location within Poland
- Coordinates: 50°10′51″N 20°53′18″E
- Country: Poland
- Voivodeship: Lesser Poland
- County: Dąbrowa
- Gmina: Olesno

Population
  - Total: 707

Wielopole [vjɛlɔˈpɔlɛ] (historical name Wielopole Moszczyńskie) is a village in the administrative district of Gmina Olesno, within Dąbrowa County, Lesser Poland Voivodeship, in southern Poland.

== Notable people ==
- Bogdan Musiał, Polish-German historian
