= Wola Mędrzechowska =

- Village
- Location within Poland
- Coordinates: 50°16′04″N 21°00′42″E
- Country: Poland
- Voivodeship: (Lesser Poland Voivodeship) Lesser Poland
- County: Dąbrowa
- Gmina: Mędrzechów

Wola Mędrzechowska [ˈvɔla mɛndʐɛˈxɔfska] is a village in the administrative district of Gmina Mędrzechów, within Dąbrowa County, Lesser Poland Voivodeship, in southern Poland.
