= Małec =

- Village
- Location within Poland
- Coordinates: 50°15′N 21°7′E
- Country: Poland
- Voivodeship: Lesser Poland
- County: Dąbrowa
- Gmina: Radgoszcz
- Population: 560

Małec [ˈmawɛt͡s] is a village in the administrative district of Gmina Radgoszcz, within Dąbrowa County, Lesser Poland Voivodeship, in southern Poland.
