= Załuże =

Załuże may refer to the following places:

- Załuże, Lesser Poland Voivodeship (south Poland)
- Załuże, Łódź Voivodeship (central Poland)
- Załuże, Subcarpathian Voivodeship (south-east Poland)
