= Smyków, Lesser Poland Voivodeship =

Smyków
- Village
- Location within Poland
- Coordinates: 50°08′49″N 21°07′34″E
- Country: Poland
- Voivodeship: Lesser Poland
- County: Dąbrowa
- Gmina: Radgoszcz

Smyków [ˈsmɨkuf] is a village in the administrative district of Gmina Radgoszcz, within Dąbrowa County, Lesser Poland Voivodeship, in southern Poland.
