= Szarwark, Lesser Poland Voivodeship =

Szarwark
- Village
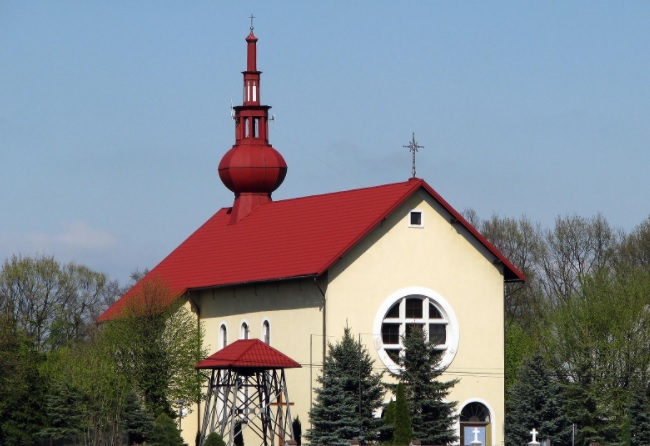
- Saint Andrew Bobola church in Szarwark

- Location within Poland
- Coordinates: 50°8′N 21°4′E
- Country: Poland
- Voivodeship: Lesser Poland
- County: Dąbrowa
- Gmina: Dąbrowa Tarnowska

Szarwark [ˈʂarvark] is a village in the administrative district of Gmina Dąbrowa Tarnowska, within Dąbrowa County, Lesser Poland Voivodeship, in southern Poland.

== History ==
Following the joint German-Soviet invasion of Poland, which started World War II in September 1939, the village was occupied by Germany until 1945. In June 1943, the German gendarmerie and Gestapo carried out a massacre of six local Poles, including two children aged 10 and 12, as punishment for rescuing Jews from the Holocaust.
