= Kanna, Poland =

Kanna
- Village
- Location within Poland
- Coordinates: 50°17′N 20°53′E
- Country: Poland
- Voivodeship: Lesser Poland
- County: Dąbrowa
- Gmina: Bolesław
- Area: 462 ha (1,140 acres)

Kanna [ˈkanna] is a village in the administrative district of Gmina Bolesław, within Dąbrowa County, Lesser Poland Voivodeship, in southern Poland.

== Geography ==
It is in the north-eastern end of the Malopolska province, in the bend of the Wisła River in front of the mouth of Nida.

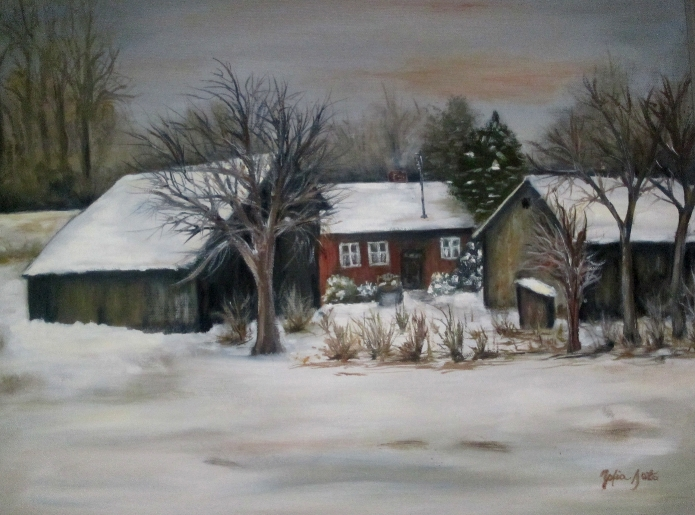
Picture painted by Zofia Soto - Chlastawa

=== Fauna ===
Many animals call the village home, including; badger, marten, European pine marten, weasel, boar, moose, deer and beavers. Additionally, Hamster European can be found, a legally protected animal. The birds include the Accipitrinae, common raven, goldfinch, lesser spotted eagle, common kestrel necked, tern, northern lapwing, cormorant, corncrake and woodpecker, Eurasian eagle-owl or buzzard.

== Climate ==
Climate areas belonging to the Sandomierz Basin are among the warmest in Poland. The average temperature in July is above 19 °C, average January -30 °C. The growing season is around 220 days, with annual rainfall of 600 – 700 mm.

== Culture ==
A brick chapel of Our Lady of the Rosary was built in 1871. Its baroque-shaped signature tower rises high above the roofs of the village. The chapel was restored in 2007.

People work in the Song and Dance Ensemble.

The village hosts a playground.

A Volunteer Fire Department is located in the House of the People.

== Transport ==
Microbus private lines and a buses provide transport.

The village can be reached from Cracow and Sandomierz by national DK 79. The ferry Nowy Korczyn/Borusowa crosses the Wisła. Provincial road DW 973 connects with Żabno Szczucin.

== Demographics ==
The villages hosts75 households. 13% work exclusively on farms, 80% farm + earn non-agricultural wages, and the remaining 7% are mainly non-agricultural wages and other income sources.

== See also ==
- Cana
- Kafr Kanna
- Kanna Arihara
