= Dąbrówki Breńskie =

- Village
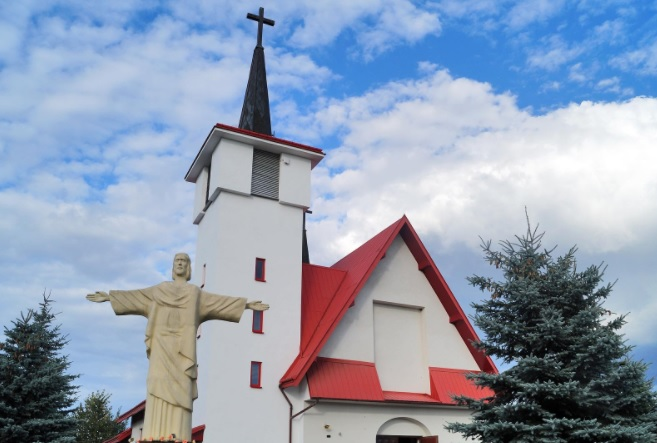
- Catholic church

- Location within Poland
- Coordinates: 50°15′N 20°57′E
- Country: Poland
- Voivodeship: Lesser Poland
- County: Dąbrowa
- Gmina: Olesno
- Population (1999): 680
- Postal code: 33-210 Olesno
- Area code: +48 14
- Car plates: KDA

Dąbrówki Breńskie (Polish pronunciation: [dɔmˈbrufkʲi ˈbrɛj̃skʲɛ]) is a village in the administrative district of Gmina Olesno, within Dąbrowa County, Lesser Poland Voivodeship, in southern Poland.
