= Odmęt =

- Village
- Location within Poland
- Coordinates: 50°18′26″N 20°58′48″E
- Country: Poland
- Voivodeship: Lesser Poland
- County: Dąbrowa
- Gmina: Mędrzechów
- Population: 200

Odmęt [ˈɔdmɛnt] is a village in the administrative district of Gmina Mędrzechów, within Dąbrowa County, Lesser Poland Voivodeship, in southern Poland.
