= Gmina Radgoszcz =

Gmina Radgoszcz Radgoszcz Commune
- Gmina
- Flag Coat of arms
- Interactive map of Gmina Radgoszcz
- Coordinates (Radgoszcz): 50°12′18″N 21°6′47″E
- Country: Poland
- Voivodeship: Lesser Poland
- County: Dąbrowa Tarnowska
- Seat: Radgoszcz

Area
  - Total: 88.3 km^{2} (34.1 sq mi)

Population (2014)
  - Total: 7,484
  - Density: 84.8/km^{2} (220/sq mi)
- Website: https://www.radgoszcz.pl

Gmina Radgoszcz is a rural gmina (administrative district) in Dąbrowa County, Lesser Poland Voivodeship, in southern Poland. Its seat is the village of Radgoszcz, which lies approximately 11 kilometres (7 mi) north-east of Dąbrowa Tarnowska and 86 km (53 mi) east of the regional capital Kraków.

The gmina covers an area of 88.3 square kilometres (34.1 sq mi); as of 2006 its total population is 7,315.

== Villages ==
Gmina Radgoszcz contains the villages and settlements of Luszowice, Małec, Radgoszcz, Smyków and Żdżary.

== Neighbouring gminas ==
Gmina Radgoszcz is bordered by the gminas of Czarna, Dąbrowa Tarnowska, Lisia Góra, Radomyśl Wielki, Szczucin and Wadowice Górne.
