= Lipiny =

Lipiny may refer to:

- Lipiny, Augustów County in Podlaskie Voivodeship (north-east Poland)
- Lipiny, Hajnówka County in Podlaskie Voivodeship (east Poland)
- Lipiny, Siemiatycze County in Podlaskie Voivodeship (east Poland)
- Lipiny, Kutno County in Łódź Voivodeship (central Poland)
- Lipiny, Łódź East County in Łódź Voivodeship (central Poland)
- Lipiny, Gmina Warta in Łódź Voivodeship (central Poland)
- Lipiny, Gmina Złoczew in Łódź Voivodeship (central Poland)
- Lipiny, Łuków County in Lublin Voivodeship (east Poland)
- Lipiny, Gmina Chodel in Opole County, Lublin Voivodeship (east Poland)
- Lipiny, Lesser Poland Voivodeship (south Poland)
- Lipiny, Dąbrowa County in Lesser Poland Voivodeship (south Poland)
- Lipiny, Subcarpathian Voivodeship (south-east Poland)
- Lipiny, Świętokrzyskie Voivodeship (south-central Poland)
- Lipiny, Włoszczowa County in Świętokrzyskie Voivodeship (south-central Poland)
- Lipiny, Ciechanów County in Masovian Voivodeship (north-central Poland)
- Lipiny, Mińsk County in Masovian Voivodeship (east-central Poland)
- Lipiny, Otwock County in Masovian Voivodeship (east-central Poland)
- Lipiny, Przysucha County in Masovian Voivodeship (east-central Poland)
- Lipiny, Radom County in Masovian Voivodeship (east-central Poland)
- Lipiny, Gmina Przesmyki in Masovian Voivodeship (east Poland)
- Lipiny, Gmina Zbuczyn in Masovian Voivodeship (east Poland)
- Lipiny, Wyszków County in Masovian Voivodeship (east-central Poland)
- Lipiny, Zwoleń County in Masovian Voivodeship (east-central Poland)
- Lipiny, Chodzież County in Greater Poland Voivodeship (west-central Poland)
- Lipiny, Gmina Osiek Mały in Greater Poland Voivodeship (central Poland)
- Lipiny, Gmina Przedecz in Greater Poland Voivodeship (central Poland)
- Lipiny, Gmina Odolanów, Ostrów County in Greater Poland Voivodeship (south-central Poland)
- Lipiny, Lubusz Voivodeship (west Poland)
- Lipiny (Świętochłowice), a district of the town of Świętochłowice in the Silesian Voivodeship (south Poland)

== See also ==
- Lipan (disambiguation)
- Lipany (disambiguation)
- Lipiany (disambiguation)
