= Slovenian Air Force and Air Defence =

Air warfare branch of the Slovenian armed forces

- Emblem of the Slovenian Air Force and Air Defence
- Founded: 1991; 35 years ago
- Country: Slovenia
- Type: Air force
- Role: Aerial defence Aerial warfare
- Size: 600+ personnel
- Part of: Slovenian Armed Forces
- Headquarters: Cerklje ob Krki, Brežice
- Anniversaries: 14 December; 15 December
- Equipment: 46 aircraft 6 on order
- Engagements: Slovenian War of Independence

Commanders
- Current commander: Colonel Janez Gaube

Insignia
- Roundel

- Fin flash

Aircraft flown
- Attack: Pilatus PC-9M Hudournik
- Trainer: Zlin Z-142, Zlin Z 242
- Transport: C-27J Spartan, Let L-410 Turbolet, Pilatus PC-6 Porter

Slovenian Air Force and Air Defence is a part of the Slovenian Armed Forces. It is an integral part of the command structure, not an independent branch, and is officially known as 15th Aviation Wing of the Slovenian Armed Forces.

== Duties ==
Slovenian Air Force and Air Defence aim is securing the sovereignty of the airspace of the Republic of Slovenia and providing air support to other services in the implementation of their tasks in joint operations. Its main tasks are:

- Inspection and control of the air space security
- Providing help in natural, humanitarian, and technological disasters
- Search and rescue operations
- Taking part in international missions and operations

Since Slovenia does not have the air capabilities to police its airspace in accordance with NATO standards, nor does it plan to develop such capabilities, these tasks are performed alternately by the Italian and Hungarian Air Forces under NATO command.

== History ==
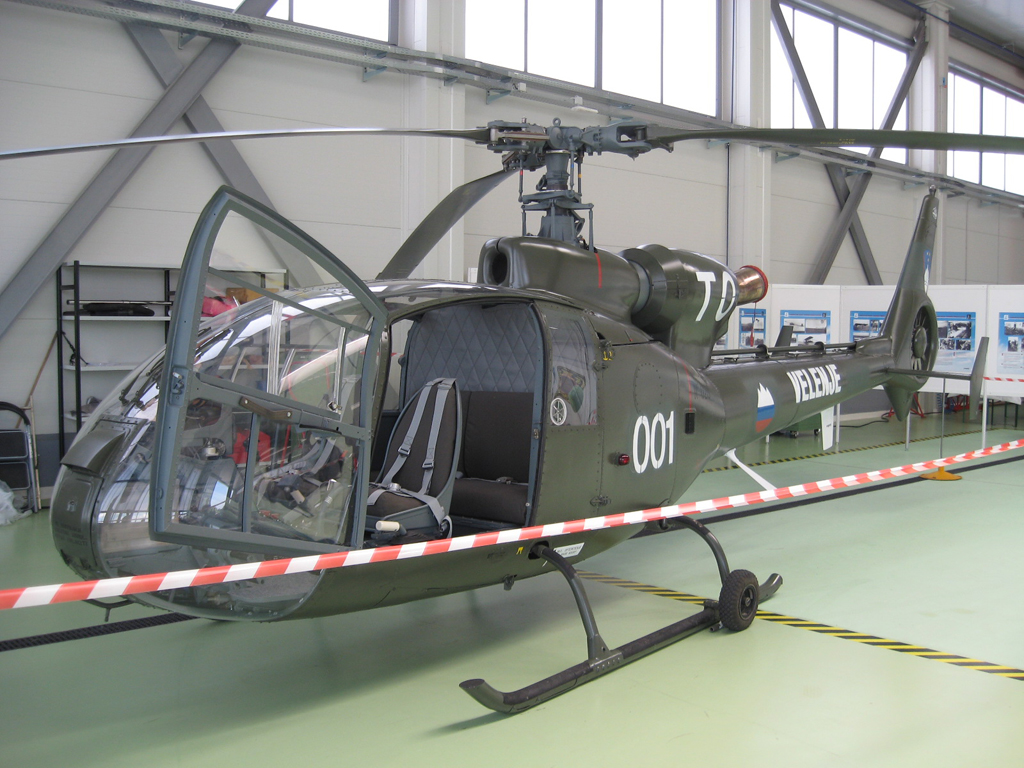
A former SOKO SA341 Gazelle on display at Cerklje air base

Slovenian contact with military aviation began during World War I, when the army and navy air services of Austria-Hungary conscripted large numbers of personnel from throughout the Empire. As the Empire began to collapse during 1918, Slovenian aircrew and ground crew switched their allegiance to the Kingdom of Serbs, Croats and Slovenes. Aircraft found on Slovenian territory were taken over by the Slovenian authorities and formed into a fledgling air arm. The new air arm was soon involved in the conflict with Austria over the border provinces of Carinthia and south Styria. Later in 1919, the Slovenian air units were absorbed into the Royal Yugoslav Air Force.

In 1968 a reserve volunteer force, the Teritorialna Obramba (Territorial Defence of the Socialist Republic of Slovenia), was established to defend local key locations in time of crisis. The Slovenian Territorial Defence HQ had a small auxiliary aviation unit stationed at Ljubljana-Polje airfield by 1969, when Government Factories Type 522 advanced trainers were being operated. These aircraft were borrowed from the Yugoslav Air Force and not owned by Slovenia. Slovenian Territorial Defence ceased to be a part of the Yugoslavian auxiliary forces on 21 June 1991, (four days prior of the proclamation of independence), when the Yugoslav army seized 12 Soko J-20 Kraguj aircraft from them.

On 28 June 1991 a Yugoslav Air Force Gazelle defected to Slovenia, providing the first helicopter for the Territorial Defence Force. During the war it also was equipped with three ex-Police Bell 412s and an Agusta A-109A. On 9 June 1992 the Air Force Unit of the Slovenian Army was renamed into 15 Brigada Vojaskega Letalstva. The 15 Brigada was divided into two squadrons, one fixed-wing and one helicopter squadron, flying from two bases, Brnik airport and Cerklje ob Krki. The 15 Brigada was under control of the 1 Air Force and Air Defence Force Command located at Kranj. In 2004 Slovenia entered NATO. Now NATO is responsible for protecting Slovenian airspace. On 8 November 2004 the 15 Brigada was officially disbanded. In its place three new units were formed.

The 15 Air Force Brigade was restructured into the 15 Helicopter Battalion, the Air Force School, and the Air Force Base. The 15 Helicopter Battalion is located at the Brnik air base. The unit is equipped with eight Bell 412 helicopters and four AS-532 Cougar helicopters. The units duties are to organise training courses for pilots and technical staff, to organise search and rescue missions and operate within the System of Civil Protection, Help and Rescue, to secure cargo transportation to mountain areas, to extinguish fires, and to provide air support for SAF units.

The Air Force Military School is located at the Cerklje ob Krki air base. The school conducts the basic and advance training programmes for future air force pilots in two Zlin 142L and eight Zlin 242L planes and four Bell 206 Jet Ranger helicopters, organises practices for air force pilots, provides fire support, and carries out various tasks for other branches of the armed forces by using the two PC-9 and nine PC-9M planes. A part of the Air Force Military School is also the parachute squad, located at the Brnik air base, which organises basic and advanced parachute training for SAF members.

The Air Force Base, located at the Cerklje ob Krki air base, carries out logistic support, such as fuel supply. The unit is equipped with two PC-6 planes and one L-410 plane. The Air Force Base unites the air supply squad and the technical support unit whose main tasks are to plan and conduct the second stage of aircraft maintenance, carry out technical personnel training, update aircraft documentation, etc. Another restructuring took place in 2007 when the Air Force School and the 15 Helicopter Battalion were made into a single command making logistics easier, and reduce staff. Following the decision to operate jet aircraft from 2015 again, major restructuring will take place at Cerklje.

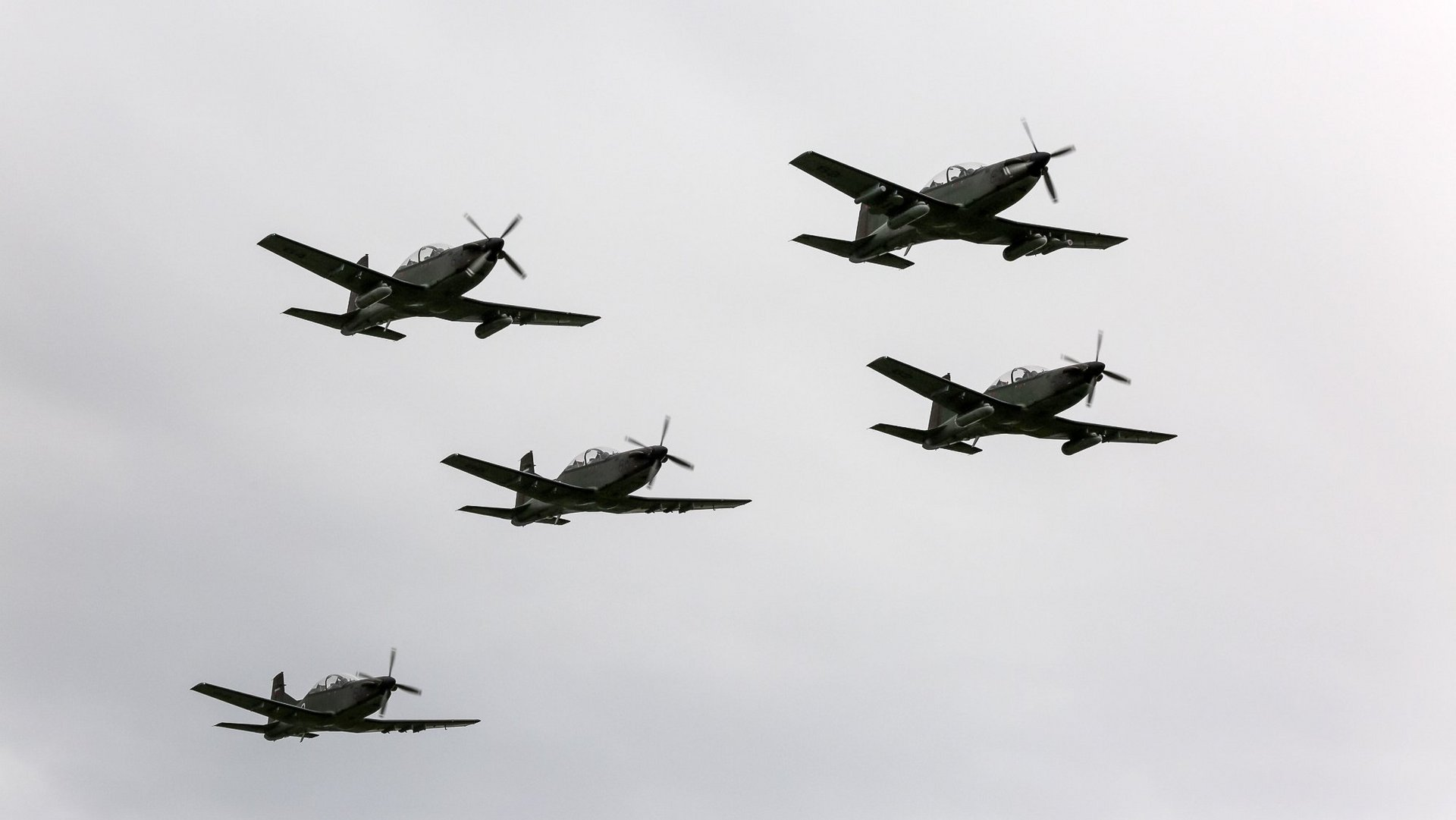
Slovenian PC-9M flying in formation

Due to reorganization of the Slovenian Armed Forces, the Air Defense and Aviation Brigade will be reconstructed to the 15th Wing (Military Aviation Regiment). The Wing will consist of 151st Rotary Wing Squadron, 152nd Fixed Wing Squadron, 153rd Aircraft Maintenance Squadron, 16th Air Space Control and Surveillance Centre, 107th Air Base and Flight School. Air Defense elements will be moved to Ground Forces.

== Current equipment ==
=== Combat aircraft ===
Equipment	Image	Country	Type	Number	Notes
Pilatus PC-9M		Switzerland	Light attack aircraft	9	

=== Transport aircraft ===
Equipment	Image	Country	Type	Number	Notes
Alenia C-27J Spartan		Italy	Tactical airlifter	2	The Slovenian Air Force took delivery of the first aircraft named Martin Krpan at the end of 2023, and the second aircraft named Edvard Rusjan at the end of 2024.
Let L-410 Turbolet		Czech Republic	Transport	1	
Dassault Falcon 2000		France	VIP transport	1	
Pilatus PC-6 Porter		Switzerland	Utility	2	Single-engined STOL utility aircraft.

=== Helicopters ===
Equipment	Image	Country	Type	Number	Notes
Bell 412		United States	Utility	8	
Eurocopter AS532 Cougar		France	Transport / Utility	4	
AgustaWestland AW139		Italy	Transport / Utility		6 ordered, another 6 planned
Bell 206		United States	Trainer / Utility	4	

=== Trainer aircraft ===
Equipment	Image	Country	Type	Number	Notes
Pipistrel Velis Electro		Slovenia	Trainer	5	
Zlín Z 43		Czech Republic	Trainer	2	
Zlín Z-242		Czech Republic	Trainer	8	

=== UAVs ===
Equipment	Image	Country	Type	Number	Notes
Bramor C4EYE		Slovenia	UAV	Multiple	Used for reconnaissance and observation tasks.
Virus SW 121		Slovenia	UAV	Unknown	Equipped with four air-to-ground missiles.
Galeb		Slovenia	UAV	Unknown	Used by the crew of TRIGLAV 11.

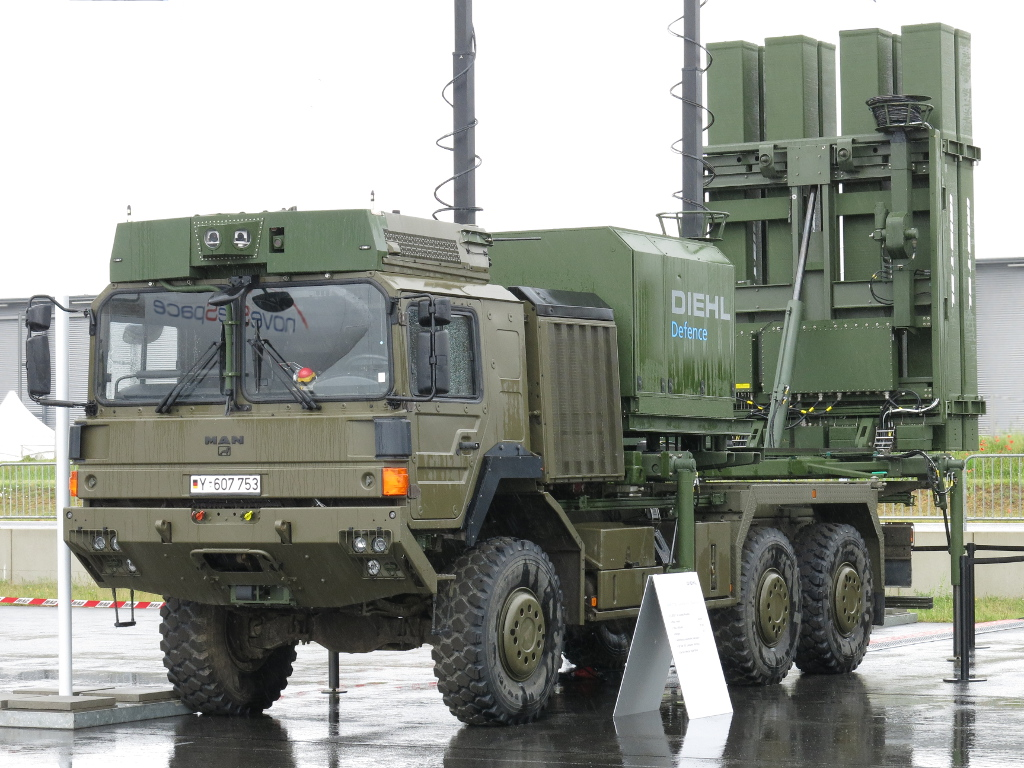
IRIS-T SLM launcher

=== Air defence ===
In 2023 the Ministry of Defence signed an agreement with Germany for procurement of three IRIS-T SLM systems each of them consisting of a radar, tactical operations center and four missile launchers as well as IRIS-T SL guided missiles and logistic support. The first system is due to arrive in the spring of 2027, the other two in the spring of 2028.

=== Radars ===
The Slovenian airspace is controlled by several radar types including the Tales Raytheon Ground Master GM-403, Ericsson Giraffe 40 with command and control capability and IAI Elta EL/M 2106 NG.

=== Retired ===
Previous aircraft operated:

- Agusta A.109 (1)
- Aérospatiale Gazelle (1) which was lost to a crash in 1994
- UTVA 75 trainer

== Incidents and accidents ==
- On 3 March 2004 a Pilatus PC-9M of the Slovenian Air Force crashed in Lenart, resulting in the death of Major Drago Svetina and destruction of the airplane.
- On 21 May 1997 a Utva 75 of the Slovenian Air Force crashed in Novo Mesto, resulting in the destruction of the airplane.
- On 21 June 1994 a SOKO HO-42 Partizan (SA 341H Gazelle) of the Slovenian Army was destroyed.
- In July 1993 a Utva 75 of the Slovenian Air Force crashed in Slovenj Gradec, resulting in the destruction of the airplane.
- In June 1975 a Agusta-Bell AB 206 of the Slovenia Police Air Wing (this accident is listed here because Slovenian Air Force later used these Slovenian Police Agusta-Bell 206s) was destroyed near Brnik. Nobody died.
