= Laskówka Chorąska =

- Village
- Location within Poland
- Coordinates: 50°07′23″N 20°58′19″E
- Country: Poland
- Voivodeship: Lesser Poland
- County: Dąbrowa
- Gmina: Dąbrowa Tarnowska

Laskówka Chorąska [lasˈkufka xɔˈrɔ̃ska] is a village in the administrative district of Gmina Dąbrowa Tarnowska, within Dąbrowa County, Lesser Poland Voivodeship, in southern Poland.
