= Łęka Szczucińska =

- Village
- Location within Poland
- Coordinates: 50°20′N 21°8′E
- Country: Poland
- Voivodeship: Lesser Poland
- County: Dąbrowa
- Gmina: Szczucin
- Population (approx.): 410

Łęka Szczucińska [ˈwɛnka ʂt͡ʂuˈt͡ɕiɲska] is a village in the administrative district of Gmina Szczucin, within Dąbrowa County, Lesser Poland Voivodeship, in southern Poland.

The village has an approximate population of 410.
