= Zalesie, Dąbrowa County =

Zalesie
- Settlement
- Location within Poland
- Coordinates: 50°18′27″N 21°11′32″E
- Country: Poland
- Voivodeship: Lesser Poland
- County: Dąbrowa
- Gmina: Szczucin

Zalesie [zaˈlɛɕɛ] is a settlement in the administrative district of Gmina Szczucin, within Dąbrowa County, Lesser Poland Voivodeship, in southern Poland.
