= Nieczajna Górna =

- Village
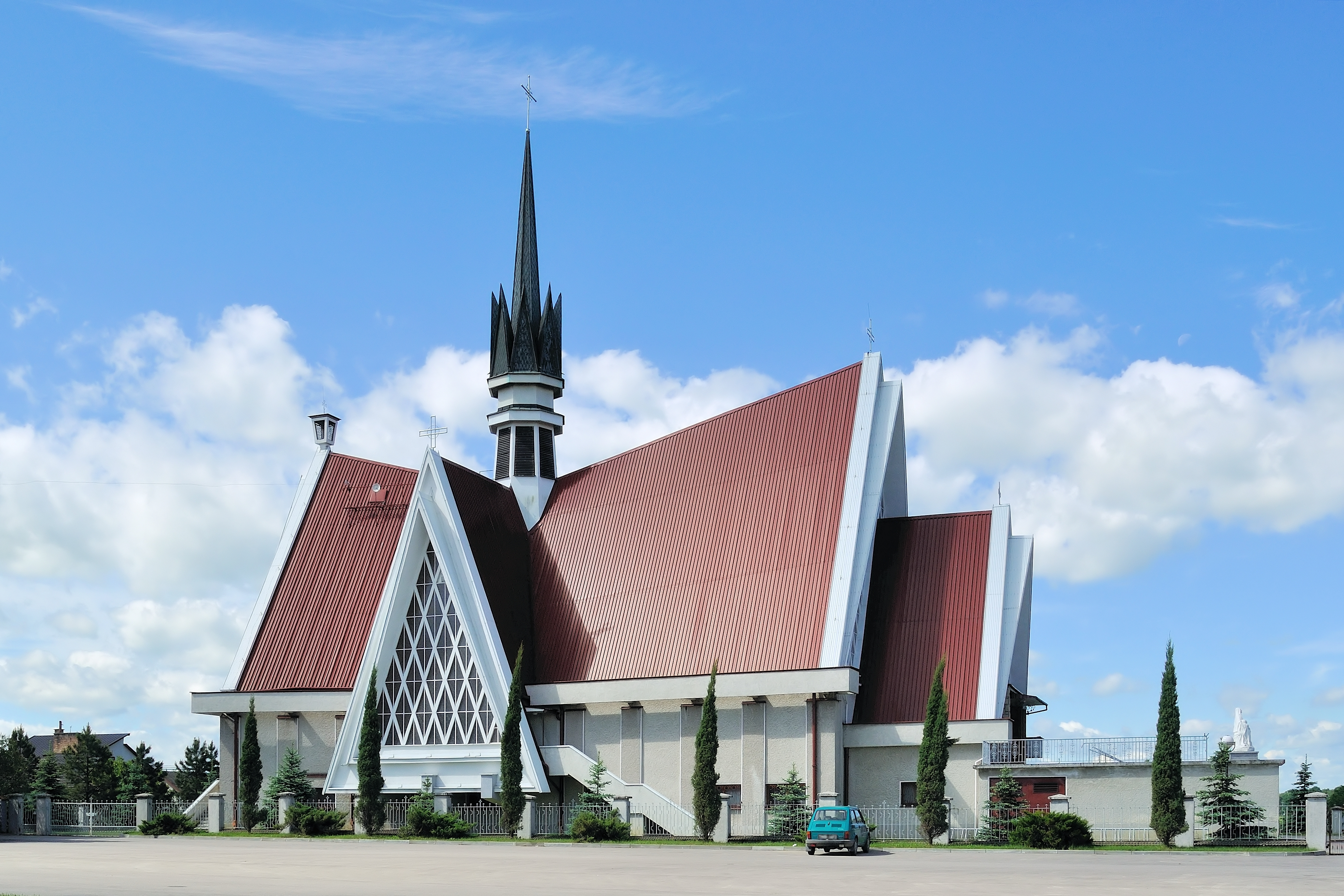

- Location within Poland
- Coordinates: 50°10′18″N 21°03′46″E
- Country: Poland
- Voivodeship: Lesser Poland
- County: Dąbrowa
- Gmina: Dąbrowa Tarnowska

Nieczajna Górna [ɲɛˈt͡ʂai̯na ˈɡurna] is a village in the administrative district of Gmina Dąbrowa Tarnowska, within Dąbrowa County, Lesser Poland Voivodeship, in southern Poland. In September 2012 there were WW1 weapons and ammunition Recovered from a nearby field by a local boy and his friend.
