= Gmina Olesno =

Gmina Olesno may refer to either of the following administrative districts in Poland:

- Gmina Olesno, Lesser Poland Voivodeship
- Gmina Olesno, Opole Voivodeship
