= Słupiec, Lesser Poland Voivodeship =

Słupiec
- Village
- Location within Poland
- Coordinates: 50°19′13″N 21°11′37″E
- Country: Poland
- Voivodeship: Lesser Poland
- County: Dąbrowa
- Gmina: Szczucin

Słupiec [ˈswupjɛt͡s] is a village in the administrative district of Gmina Szczucin, within Dąbrowa County, Lesser Poland Voivodeship, in southern Poland.
