= Podborze =

Podborze may refer to the following places:

- Podborze, Lesser Poland Voivodeship (south Poland)
- Podborze, Maków County in Masovian Voivodeship (east-central Poland)
- Podborze, Gmina Ostrów Mazowiecka, Ostrów County in Masovian Voivodeship (east-central Poland)
- Podborze, Podkarpackie Voivodeship (south-east Poland)
