= Luszowice, Dąbrowa County =

Luszowice
- Village
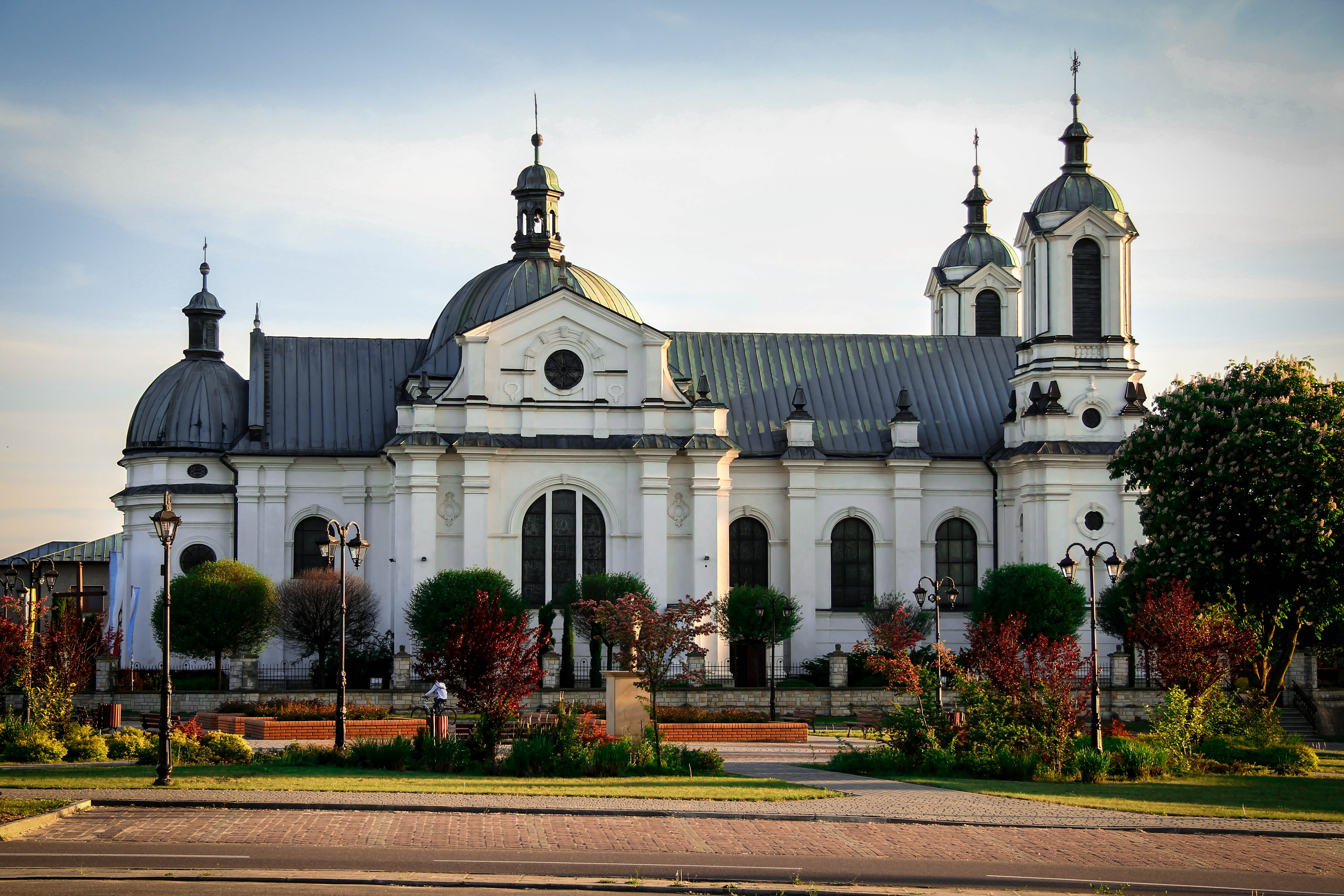
- Church of Saint Joseph

- Location within Poland
- Coordinates: 50°9′17″N 21°6′13″E
- Country: Poland
- Voivodeship: Lesser Poland
- County: Dąbrowa
- Gmina: Radgoszcz

Population
  - Total: 2,700

Luszowice [luʂɔˈvit͡sɛ] is a village in the administrative district of Gmina Radgoszcz, within Dąbrowa County, Lesser Poland Voivodeship, in southern Poland.
