= Borki, Lesser Poland Voivodeship =

Borki
- Village
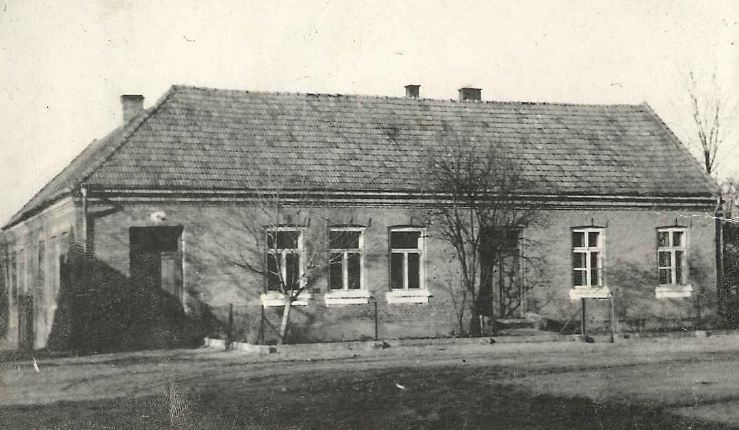
- Former elementary school

- Location within Poland
- Coordinates: 50°19′4″N 21°8′28″E
- Country: Poland
- Voivodeship: Lesser Poland
- County: Dąbrowa
- Gmina: Szczucin
- Population: 850

Borki [ˈbɔrki] is a village in the administrative district of Gmina Szczucin, within Dąbrowa County, Lesser Poland Voivodeship, in southern Poland.

Before Polish administrative reorganization in 1999 Borki village was part of Tarnów Voivodeship (1975–1998).
