= Zakępie, Lesser Poland Voivodeship =

Zakępie
- Settlement
- Location within Poland
- Coordinates: 50°19′53″N 21°11′21″E
- Country: Poland
- Voivodeship: Lesser Poland
- County: Dąbrowa
- Gmina: Szczucin

Zakępie [zaˈkɛmpjɛ] is a settlement in the administrative district of Gmina Szczucin, within Dąbrowa County, Lesser Poland Voivodeship, in southern Poland.
