= Żdżary, Lesser Poland Voivodeship =

Żdżary
- Village
- Location within Poland
- Coordinates: 50°11′53″N 21°5′51″E
- Country: Poland
- Voivodeship: Lesser Poland
- County: Dąbrowa
- Gmina: Radgoszcz
- Elevation: 193 m (633 ft)

Żdżary [ˈʐd͡ʐarɨ] is a village in the administrative district of Gmina Radgoszcz, within Dąbrowa County, Lesser Poland Voivodeship, in southern Poland.
