= Lubasz, Lesser Poland Voivodeship =

Lubasz
- Village
- Location within Poland
- Coordinates: 50°18′N 21°4′E
- Country: Poland
- Voivodeship: Lesser Poland
- County: Dąbrowa
- Gmina: Szczucin
- Population: 1,300

Lubasz [ˈlubaʂ] is a village in the administrative district of Gmina Szczucin, within Dąbrowa County, Lesser Poland Voivodeship, in southern Poland.
