= Niwki =

Niwki may refer to the following places:

- Niwki, Tuchola County in Kuyavian-Pomeranian Voivodeship (north-central Poland)
- Niwki, Włocławek County in Kuyavian-Pomeranian Voivodeship (north-central Poland)
- Niwki, Dąbrowa County in Lesser Poland Voivodeship (south Poland)
- Niwki, Nowy Targ County in Lesser Poland Voivodeship (south Poland)
- Niwki, Masovian Voivodeship (east-central Poland)
- Niwki, Greater Poland Voivodeship (west-central Poland)
- Niwki, Silesian Voivodeship (south Poland)
- Niwki, Namysłów County in Opole Voivodeship (south-west Poland)
- Niwki, Gmina Chrząstowice, Opole County in Opole Voivodeship (south-west Poland)
- Niwki, Strzelce County in Opole Voivodeship (south-west Poland)
