= Czajków, Lesser Poland Voivodeship =

Czajków
- Settlement
- Location within Poland
- Coordinates: 50°18′2″N 21°3′10″E
- Country: Poland
- Voivodeship: Lesser Poland
- County: Dąbrowa
- Gmina: Szczucin

Czajków [ˈt͡ʂai̯kuf] is a settlement in the administrative district of Gmina Szczucin, within Dąbrowa County, Lesser Poland Voivodeship, in southern Poland.
