= Podlesie, Dąbrowa County =

Podlesie
- Settlement
- Location within Poland
- Coordinates: 50°18′57″N 21°10′52″E
- Country: Poland
- Voivodeship: Lesser Poland
- County: Dąbrowa
- Gmina: Szczucin

Podlesie [pɔdˈlɛɕɛ] is a settlement in the administrative district of Gmina Szczucin, within Dąbrowa County, Lesser Poland Voivodeship, in southern Poland.
