= Ćwików =

- Village
- Location within Poland
- Coordinates: 50°14′N 20°54′E
- Country: Poland
- Voivodeship: Lesser Poland
- County: Dąbrowa
- Gmina: Olesno

Ćwików [ˈt͡ɕfikuf] is a village in the administrative district of Gmina Olesno, within Dąbrowa County, Lesser Poland Voivodeship, in southern Poland.
