= Adamierz, Lesser Poland Voivodeship =

Adamierz
- Village
- Location within Poland
- Coordinates: 50°12′12″N 20°54′3″E
- Country: Poland
- Voivodeship: Lesser Poland
- County: Dąbrowa
- Gmina: Olesno
- Population: 300

Adamierz [aˈdamjɛʂ] is a village in the administrative district of Gmina Olesno, within Dąbrowa County, Lesser Poland Voivodeship, in southern Poland.
