= Swarzów =

- Village
- Location within Poland
- Coordinates: 50°12′N 20°57′E
- Country: Poland
- Voivodeship: Lesser Poland
- County: Dąbrowa
- Gmina: Olesno
- Population: 751

Swarzów [ˈsfaʐuf] is a village in the administrative district of Gmina Olesno, within Dąbrowa County, Lesser Poland Voivodeship, in southern Poland.
