= Grądy, Lesser Poland Voivodeship =

Grądy
- Village
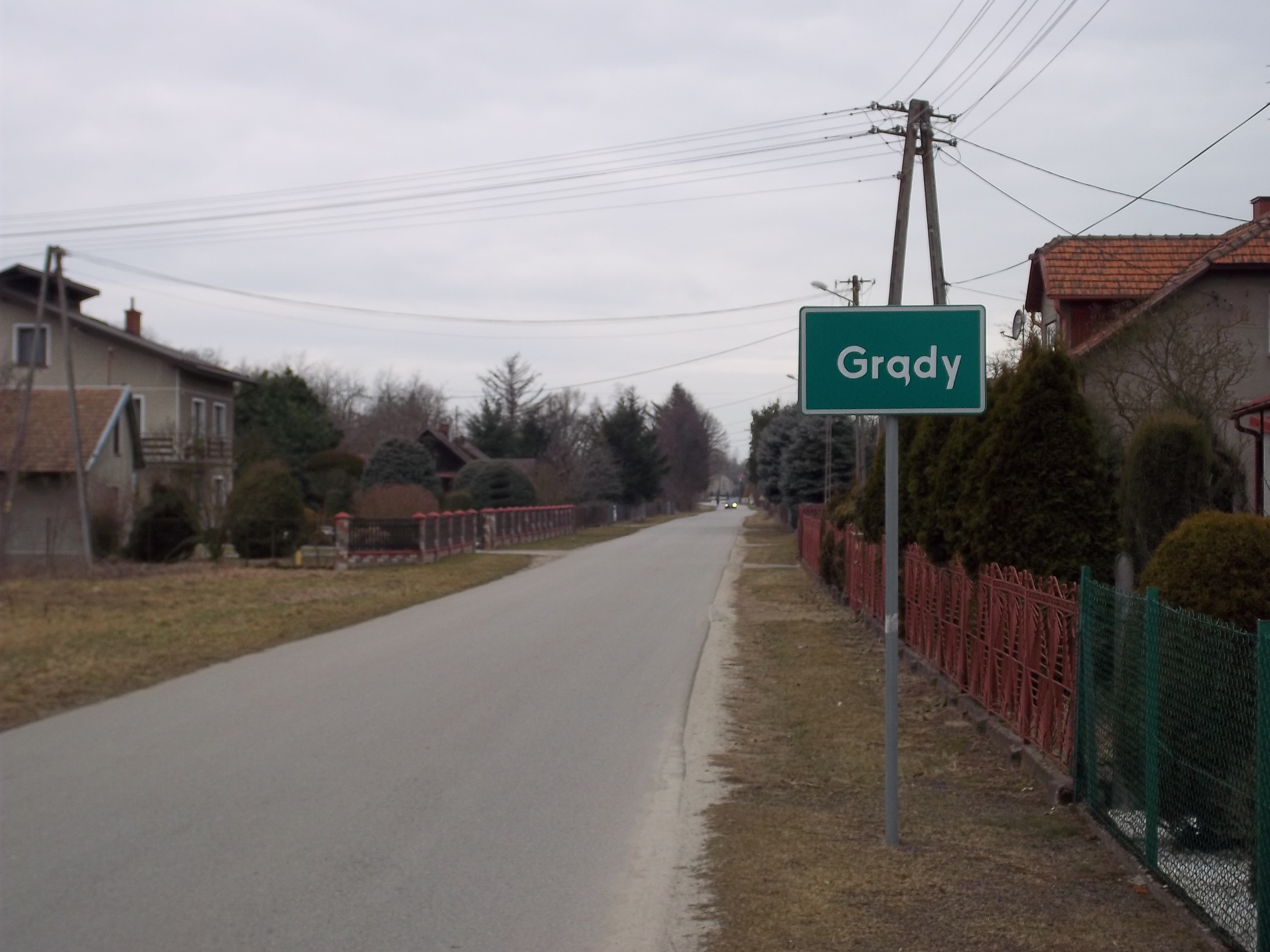

- Location within Poland
- Coordinates: 50°15′18″N 20°56′41″E
- Country: Poland
- Voivodeship: Lesser Poland
- County: Dąbrowa
- Gmina: Mędrzechów

Grądy [ˈɡrɔndɨ] is a village in the administrative district of Gmina Mędrzechów, within Dąbrowa County, Lesser Poland Voivodeship, in southern Poland.
