= Strojców =

- Village
- Location within Poland
- Coordinates: 50°18′N 20°54′E
- Country: Poland
- Voivodeship: Lesser Poland
- County: Dąbrowa
- Gmina: Bolesław
- Population: 100

Strojców [ˈstrɔi̯t͡suf] is a village in the administrative district of Gmina Bolesław, within Dąbrowa County, Lesser Poland Voivodeship, in southern Poland.
