= Skrzynka =

Skrzynka may refer to:

- Skrzynka, Lower Silesian Voivodeship (south-west Poland)
- Skrzynka, Dąbrowa County in Lesser Poland Voivodeship (south Poland)
- Skrzynka, Myślenice County in Lesser Poland Voivodeship (south Poland)
- Skrzynka, West Pomeranian Voivodeship (north-west Poland)
