= Świdrówka =

- Village
- Location within Poland
- Coordinates: 50°18′44″N 21°06′13″E
- Country: Poland
- Voivodeship: Lesser Poland
- County: Dąbrowa

Świdrówka [ɕfiˈdrufka] is a village in the administrative district of Gmina Szczucin, within Dąbrowa County, Lesser Poland Voivodeship, in southern Poland.
