= Łabuzówka =

- Settlement
- Location within Poland
- Coordinates: 50°19′36″N 21°12′37″E
- Country: Poland
- Voivodeship: Lesser Poland
- County: Dąbrowa
- Gmina: Szczucin

Łabuzówka [wabuˈzufka] is a settlement in the administrative district of Gmina Szczucin, within Dąbrowa County, Lesser Poland Voivodeship, in southern Poland.
