= Radwan, Lesser Poland Voivodeship =

Radwan
- Village
- Location within Poland
- Coordinates: 50°15′N 21°3′E
- Country: Poland
- Voivodeship: Lesser Poland
- County: Dąbrowa
- Gmina: Szczucin

Radwan [ˈradvan] is a village in the administrative district of Gmina Szczucin, within Dąbrowa County, Lesser Poland Voivodeship, in southern Poland.
