= Dąbrowica, Dąbrowa County =

Dąbrowica
- Village
- Location within Poland
- Coordinates: 50°19′N 21°7′E
- Country: Poland
- Voivodeship: Lesser Poland
- County: Dąbrowa
- Gmina: Szczucin
- Population (approx.): 860

Dąbrowica [dɔmbrɔˈvit͡sa] is a village in the administrative district of Gmina Szczucin, within Dąbrowa County, Lesser Poland Voivodeship, in southern Poland.

The village has an approximate population of 860.
