= Pilcza Żelichowska =

- Village
- Location within Poland
- Coordinates: 50°12′59″N 20°52′3″E
- Country: Poland
- Voivodeship: Lesser Poland
- County: Dąbrowa
- Gmina: Olesno

Pilcza Żelichowska [ˈpilt͡ʂa ʐɛliˈxɔfska] is a village in the administrative district of Gmina Olesno, within Dąbrowa County, Lesser Poland Voivodeship, in southern Poland.
