= Świebodzin (disambiguation) =

Świebodzin is a town in Lubusz Voivodeship (west Poland).

Świebodzin may also refer to:

- Świebodzin, Dąbrowa County in Lesser Poland Voivodeship (south Poland)
- Świebodzin, Tarnów County in Lesser Poland Voivodeship (south Poland)
