= Żelazówka =

- Village
- Location within Poland
- Coordinates: 50°8′05″N 20°59′01″E
- Country: Poland
- Voivodeship: Lesser Poland
- County: Dąbrowa
- Gmina: Dąbrowa Tarnowska

Żelazówka [ʐɛlaˈzufka] is a village in the administrative district of Gmina Dąbrowa Tarnowska, within Dąbrowa County, Lesser Poland Voivodeship, in southern Poland.
