= Samocice =

- Village
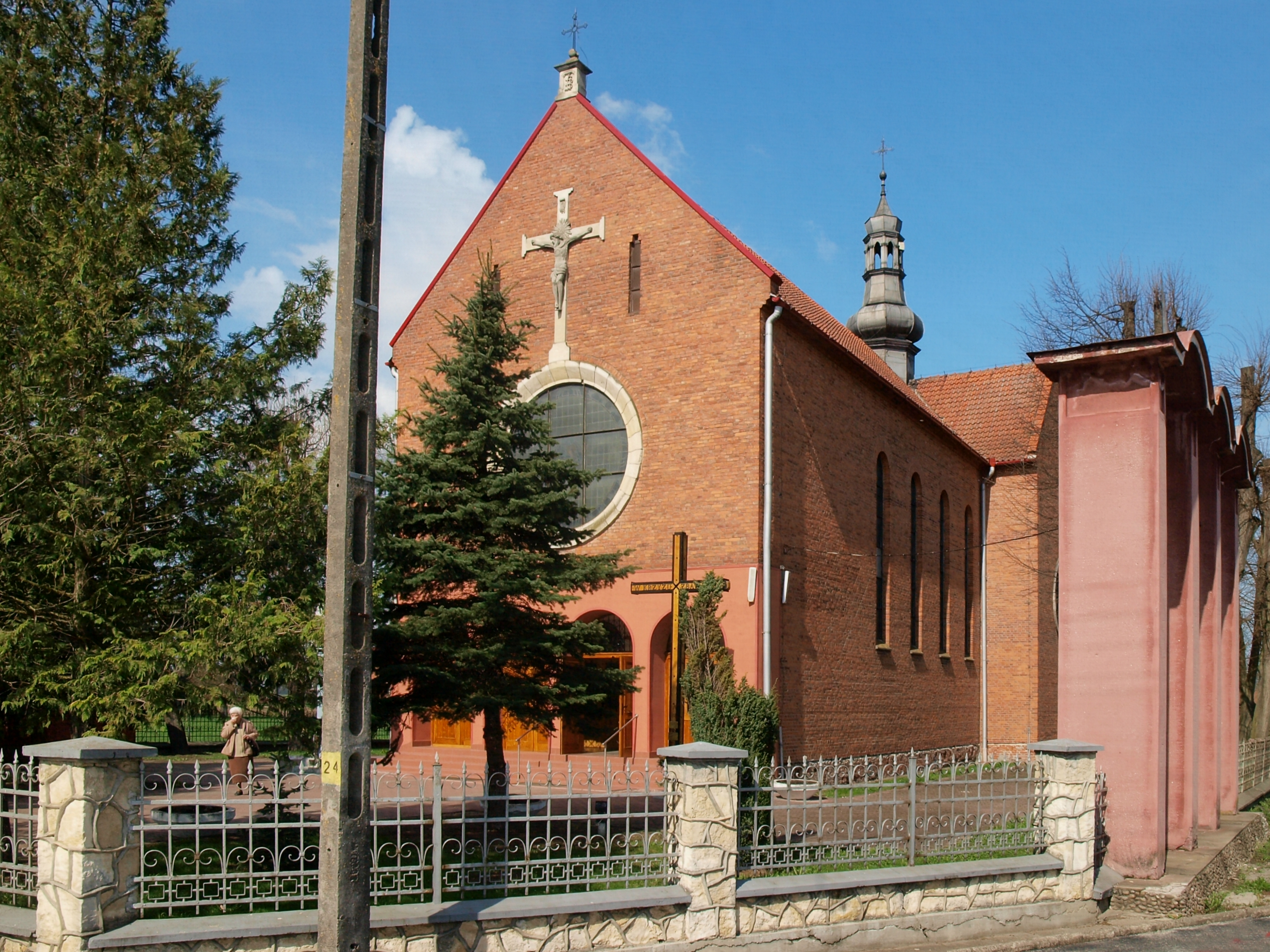
- Catholic church

- Location within Poland
- Coordinates: 50°16′N 20°53′E
- Country: Poland
- Voivodeship: Lesser Poland
- County: Dąbrowa
- Gmina: Bolesław

Samocice [samɔˈt͡ɕit͡sɛ] is a village in the administrative district of Gmina Bolesław, within Dąbrowa County, Lesser Poland Voivodeship, in southern Poland.
