= Wola Szczucińska =

- Village
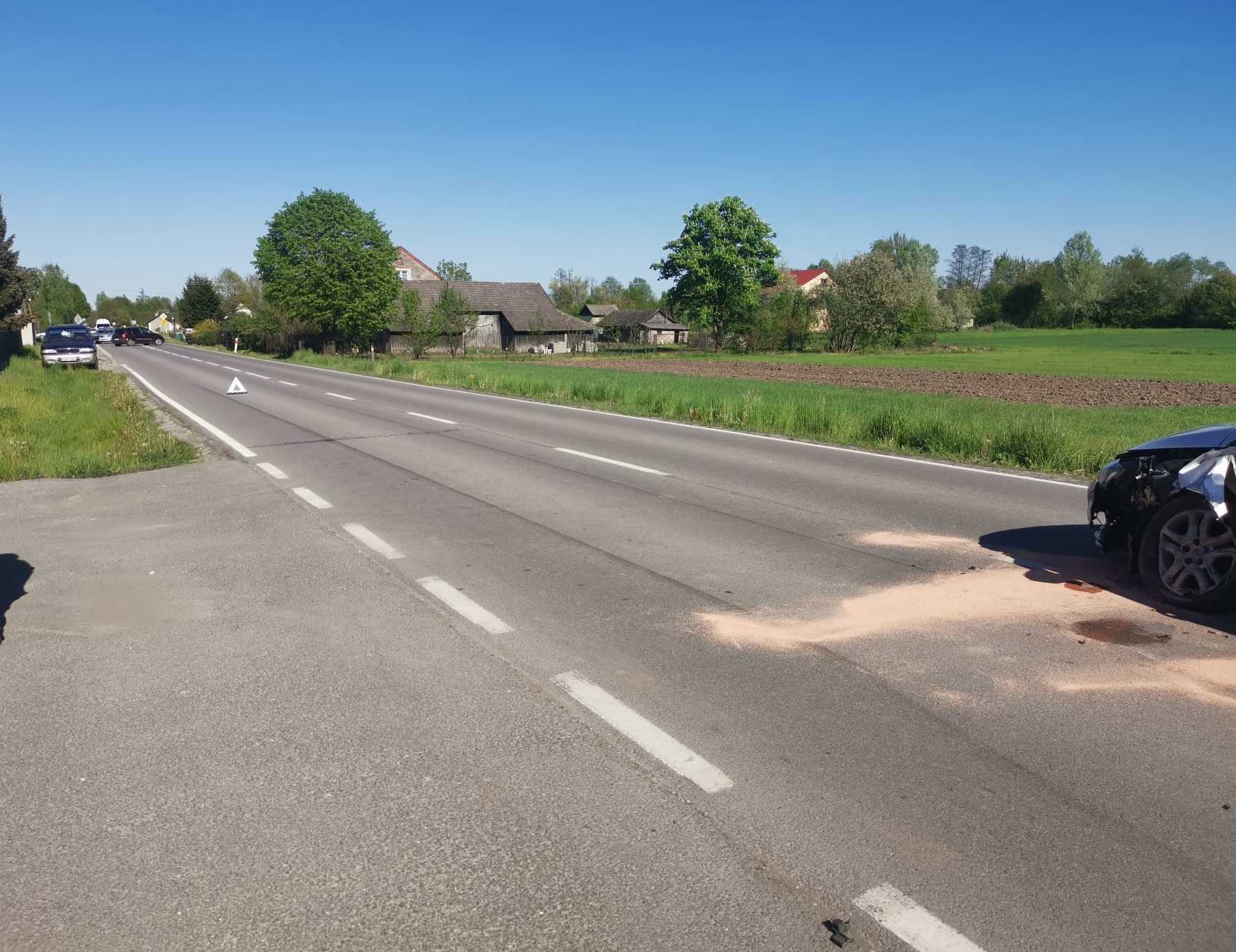

- Location within Poland
- Coordinates: 50°19′07″N 21°07′17″E
- Country: Poland
- Voivodeship: Lesser Poland
- County: Dąbrowa
- Gmina: Szczucin

Wola Szczucińska [ˈvɔla ʂt͡ʂuˈt͡ɕiɲska] is a village in the administrative district of Gmina Szczucin, within Dąbrowa County, Lesser Poland Voivodeship, in southern Poland.
