= Tonia, Lesser Poland Voivodeship =

Tonia
- Village
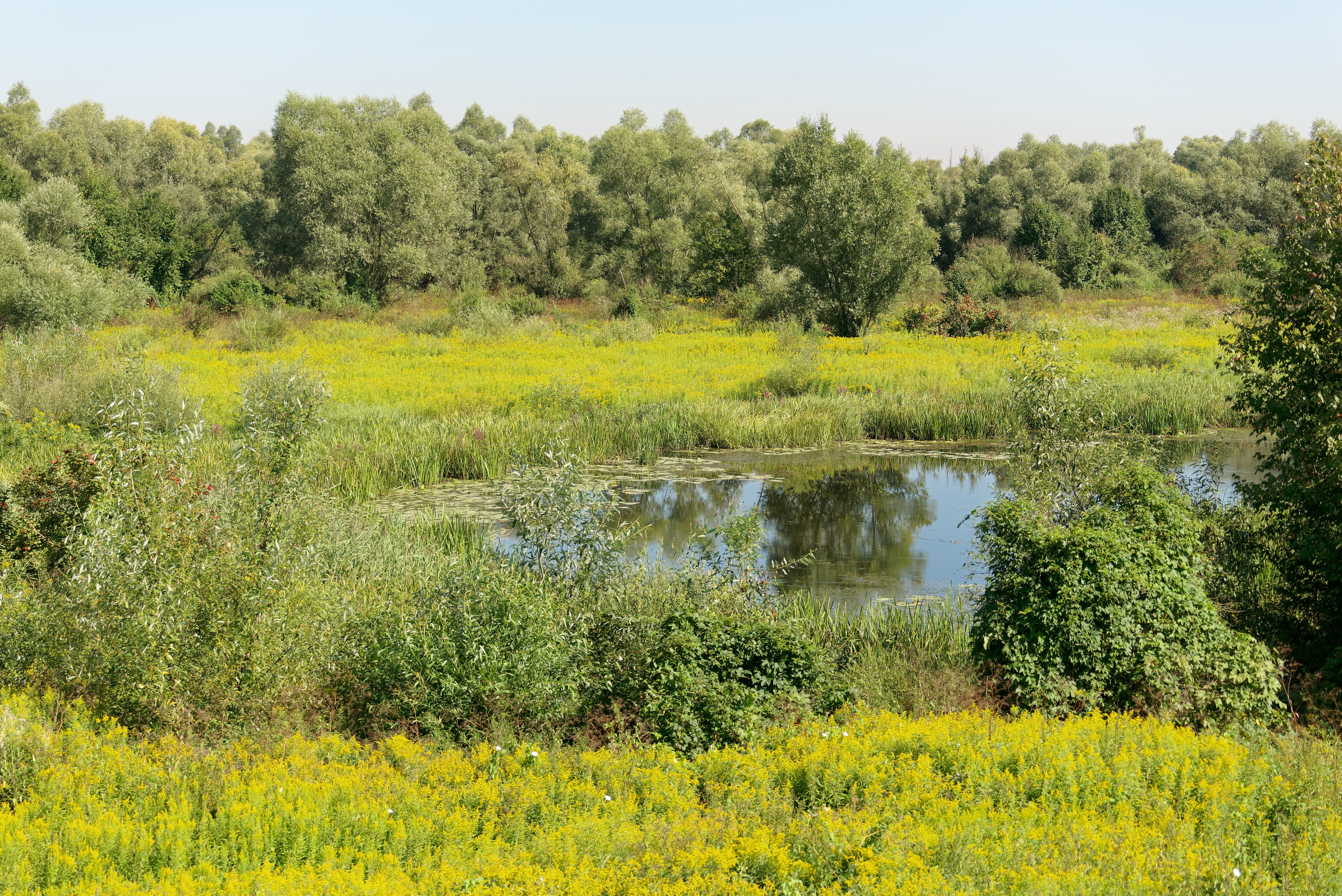
- Lake

- Location within Poland
- Coordinates: 50°17′26″N 20°55′04″E
- Country: Poland
- Voivodeship: Lesser Poland
- County: Dąbrowa
- Gmina: Bolesław

Tonia [ˈtɔɲa] is a village in the administrative district of Gmina Bolesław, within Dąbrowa County, Lesser Poland Voivodeship, in southern Poland.
