= Oleśnica, Lesser Poland Voivodeship =

Oleśnica
- Village
- Location within Poland
- Coordinates: 50°10′N 20°56′E
- Country: Poland
- Voivodeship: Lesser Poland
- County: Dąbrowa
- Gmina: Olesno

Population
  - Total: 752
- Time zone: UTC+1 (CET)
  - Summer (DST): UTC+2 (CEST)

Oleśnica (Polish: [ɔlɛˈɕɲit͡sa]) is a village in the administrative district of Gmina Olesno, within Dąbrowa County, Lesser Poland Voivodeship, in southern Poland.

In Kozubów, today's part of Oleśnica, the outstanding Polish beekeeper Professor Leonard Weber (1889–1975) was born.
