= Brzezówka, Lesser Poland Voivodeship =

Brzezówka
- Village
- Location within Poland
- Coordinates: 50°16′N 21°6′E
- Country: Poland
- Voivodeship: Lesser Poland
- County: Dąbrowa
- Gmina: Szczucin

Brzezówka [bʐɛˈzufka] is a village in the administrative district of Gmina Szczucin, within Dąbrowa County, Lesser Poland Voivodeship, in southern Poland.
