= Wólka Grądzka =

- Village
- Location within Poland
- Coordinates: 50°15′N 20°58′E
- Country: Poland
- Voivodeship: Lesser Poland
- County: Dąbrowa
- Gmina: Mędrzechów

Wólka Grądzka [ˈvulka ˈɡrɔnt͡ska] is a village in the administrative district of Gmina Mędrzechów, within Dąbrowa County, Lesser Poland Voivodeship, in southern Poland.
