= Wieżyce =

- Settlement
- Location within Poland
- Coordinates: 50°16′38″N 21°3′43″E
- Country: Poland
- Voivodeship: Lesser Poland
- County: Dąbrowa
- Gmina: Szczucin

Wieżyce [vjɛˈʐɨt͡sɛ] is a settlement in the administrative district of Gmina Szczucin, within Dąbrowa County, Lesser Poland Voivodeship, in southern Poland.
