= Gmina Mędrzechów =

Gmina Mędrzechów Mędrzechów Commune
- Gmina
- Interactive map of Gmina Mędrzechów
- Coordinates (Mędrzechów): 50°17′N 20°56′E
- Country: Poland
- Voivodeship: Lesser Poland
- County: Dąbrowa
- Seat: Mędrzechów

Area
  - Total: 43.67 km^{2} (16.86 sq mi)

Population (2006)
  - Total: 3,608
  - Density: 82.62/km^{2} (214.0/sq mi)
- Website: http://www.medrzechow.net/

Gmina Mędrzechów is a rural gmina (administrative district) in Dąbrowa County, Lesser Poland Voivodeship, in southern Poland. Its seat is the village of Mędrzechów, which lies approximately 14 kilometres (9 mi) north of Dąbrowa Tarnowska and 76 km (47 mi) east of the regional capital Kraków.

The gmina covers an area of 43.67 square kilometres (16.9 sq mi), and as of 2006 its total population is 3,608.

== Villages ==
Gmina Mędrzechów contains the villages and settlements of Grądy, Kupienin, Mędrzechów, Odmęt, Wójcina, Wola Mędrzechowska and Wólka Grądzka.

== Neighbouring gminas ==
Gmina Mędrzechów is bordered by the gminas of Bolesław, Dąbrowa Tarnowska, Nowy Korczyn, Olesno, Pacanów and Szczucin.
