= Gmina Bolesław =

Gmina Bolesław may refer to either of the following rural administrative districts in Lesser Poland Voivodeship, Poland:

- Gmina Bolesław, Dąbrowa County
- Gmina Bolesław, Olkusz County
