= Gruszów Wielki =

- Village
- Location within Poland
- Coordinates: 50°12′N 21°3′E
- Country: Poland
- Voivodeship: Lesser Poland
- County: Dąbrowa
- Gmina: Dąbrowa Tarnowska

Gruszów Wielki (Polish pronunciation: [ˈɡruʂuv ˈvjɛlkʲi]) is a village in the administrative district of Gmina Dąbrowa Tarnowska, within Dąbrowa County, Lesser Poland Voivodeship, in southern Poland.
