= Skrzynka, Dąbrowa County =

Skrzynka
- Village
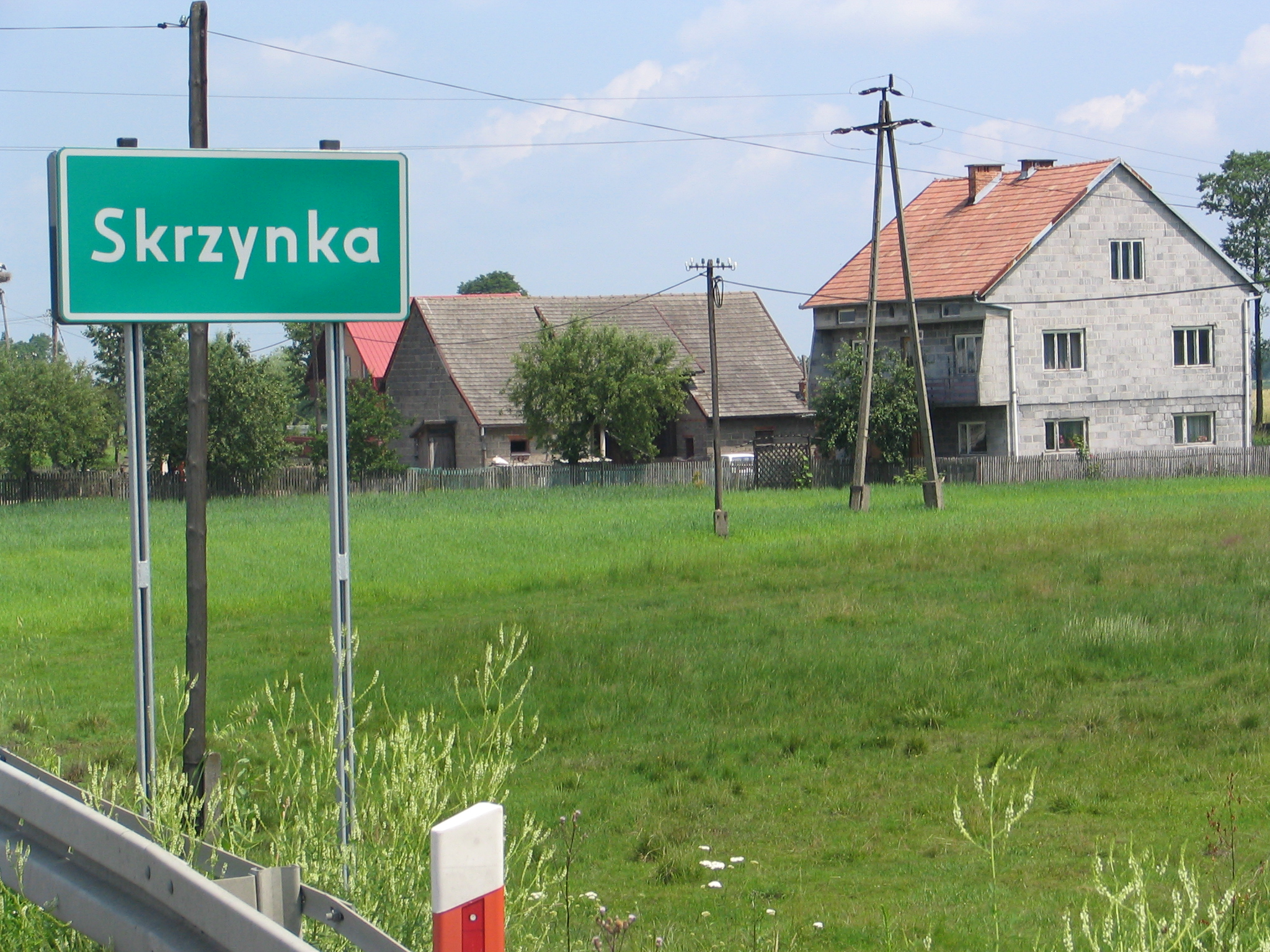

- Location within Poland
- Coordinates: 50°16′N 21°3′E
- Country: Poland
- Voivodeship: Lesser Poland
- County: Dąbrowa
- Gmina: Szczucin

Skrzynka [ˈskʂɨŋka] is a village in the administrative district of Gmina Szczucin, within Dąbrowa County, Lesser Poland Voivodeship, in southern Poland.
