= Gmina Bolesław, Dąbrowa County =

Gmina Bolesław Bolesław Commune
- Gmina
- Coat of arms
- Interactive map of Gmina Bolesław
- Coordinates (Bolesław): 50°17′N 20°54′E
- Country: Poland
- Voivodeship: Lesser Poland
- County: Dąbrowa
- Seat: Bolesław

Area
  - Total: 35.41 km^{2} (13.67 sq mi)

Population (2006)
  - Total: 2,868
  - Density: 80.99/km^{2} (209.8/sq mi)

Gmina Bolesław is a rural gmina (administrative district) in Dąbrowa County, Lesser Poland Voivodeship, in southern Poland. Its seat is the village of Bolesław, which lies approximately 15 kilometres (9 mi) north-west of Dąbrowa Tarnowska and 73 km (45 mi) east of the regional capital Kraków.

The gmina covers an area of 35.41 square kilometres (13.7 sq mi), and as of 2006 its total population is 2,868.

== Villages ==
Gmina Bolesław contains the villages and settlements of Bolesław, Kanna, Kuzie, Pawłów, Podlipie, Samocice, Strojców, Świebodzin and Tonia.

== Neighbouring gminas ==
Gmina Bolesław is bordered by the gminas of Gręboszów, Mędrzechów, Nowy Korczyn and Olesno.
