= Radgoszcz, Lesser Poland Voivodeship =

Radgoszcz
- Village
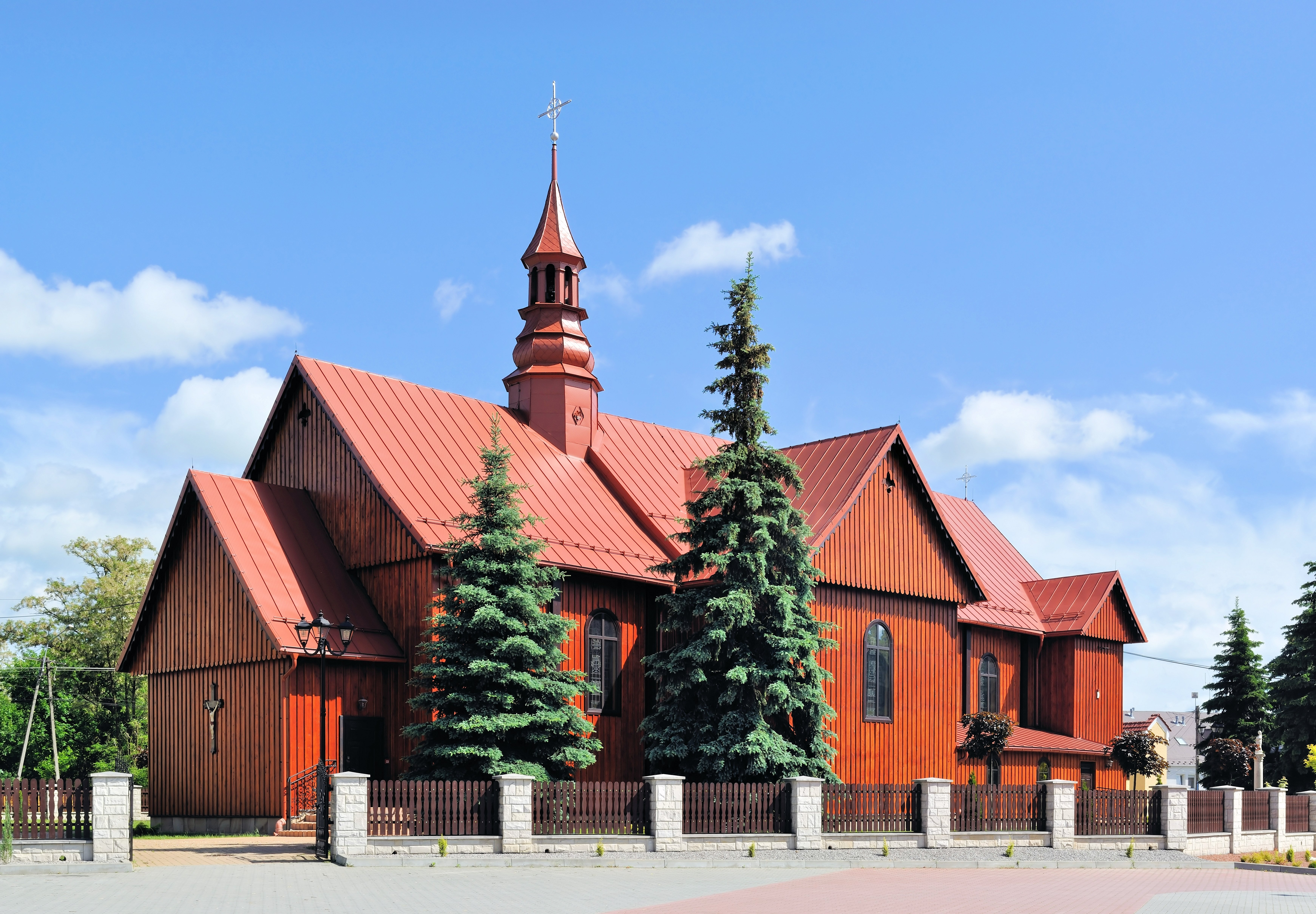
- Church of Saint Casimir

- Location within Poland
- Coordinates: 50°12′18″N 21°6′47″E
- Country: Poland
- Voivodeship: Lesser Poland
- County: Dąbrowa Tarnowska
- Gmina: Radgoszcz
- Founded: 15th century

Population
  - Total: 7,600
- Vehicle registration: KDA
- Website: www.radgoszcz.pl

Radgoszcz [ˈradɡɔʂt͡ʂ] is a village in Dąbrowa County, Lesser Poland Voivodeship, in southern Poland. It is the seat of the gmina (administrative district) called Gmina Radgoszcz.

== History ==
Radgoszcz was probably founded in the 15th century. The local Catholic parish and wooden church were founded by nobleman Jerzy Lubomirski in the 1660s.

Following the joint German-Soviet invasion of Poland, which started World War II in September 1939, the village was occupied by Germany until 1945. In 1942, the German gendarmerie carried out executions of Jews and their Polish rescuers in Radgoszcz. The victims of the August 25 murder were Zofia Wójcik, her two children and one sheltered Jew, and the victims of the September 13 murder were three Polish farmers and one sheltered Jew.
