= Gmina Olesno, Lesser Poland Voivodeship =

Gmina Olesno Olesno Commune
- Gmina
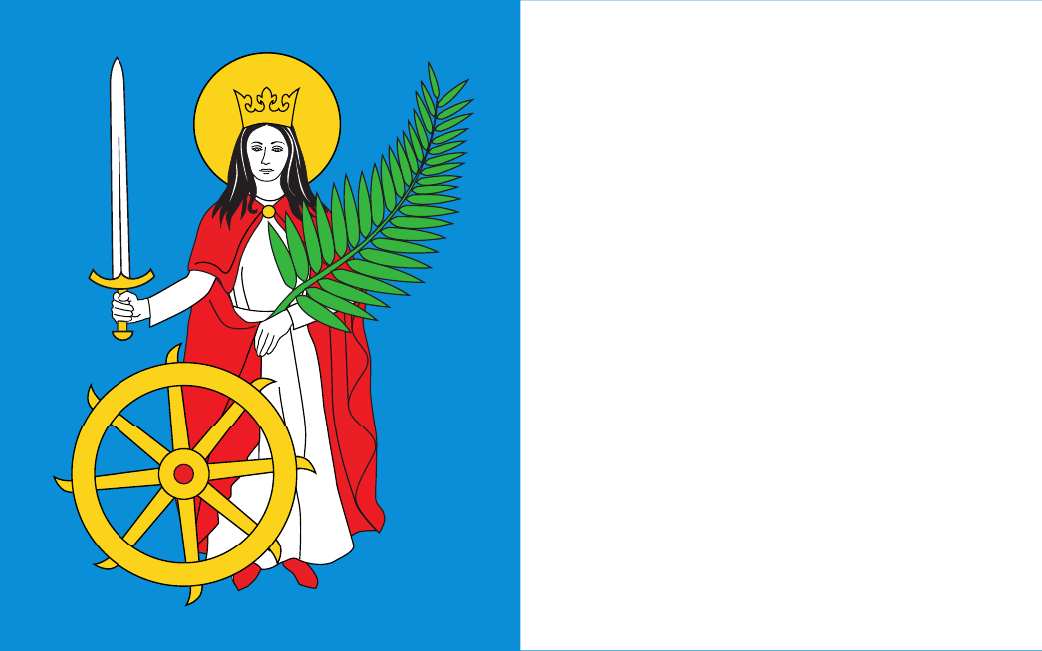
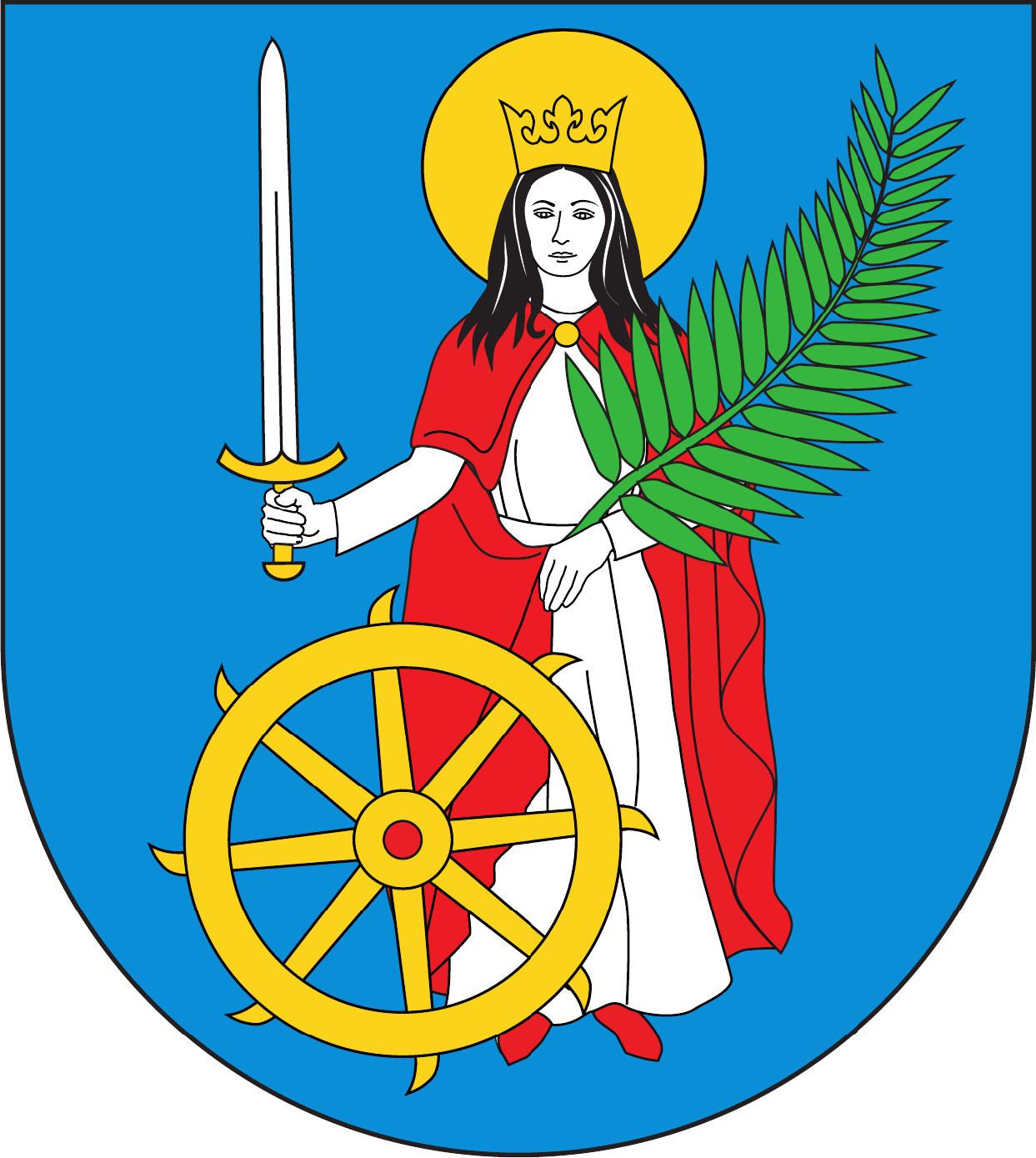
- Flag Coat of arms
- Interactive map of Gmina Olesno
- Coordinates (Olesno): 50°13′N 20°56′E
- Country: Poland
- Voivodeship: Lesser Poland
- County: Dąbrowa
- Seat: Olesno

Area
  - Total: 77.77 km^{2} (30.03 sq mi)

Population (2006)
  - Total: 7,633
  - Density: 98.15/km^{2} (254.2/sq mi)
- Website: http://www.olesno.intarnet.pl/ https://gminaolesno.pl/

Gmina Olesno is a rural gmina (administrative district) in Dąbrowa County, Lesser Poland Voivodeship, in southern Poland. Its seat is the village of Olesno, which lies approximately 7 kilometres (4 mi) north-west of Dąbrowa Tarnowska and 74 km (46 mi) east of the regional capital Kraków.

The gmina covers an area of 77.77 square kilometres (30.0 sq mi), and as of 2006 its total population is 7,633.

== Villages ==
Gmina Olesno contains the villages and settlements of Adamierz, Ćwików, Dąbrówka Gorzycka, Dąbrówki Breńskie, Niwki, Oleśnica, Olesno, Pilcza Żelichowska, Podborze, Swarzów, Wielopole and Zalipie.

== Neighbouring gminas ==
Gmina Olesno is bordered by the gminas of Bolesław, Dąbrowa Tarnowska, Gręboszów, Mędrzechów and Żabno.
