= Gmina Dąbrowa Tarnowska =

Gmina Dąbrowa Tarnowska Dąbrowa Tarnowska Commune
- Gmina
- Coat of arms
- Interactive map of Gmina Dąbrowa Tarnowska
- Coordinates (Dąbrowa Tarnowska): 50°10′N 20°59′E
- Country: Poland
- Voivodeship: Lesser Poland
- County: Dąbrowa
- Seat: Dąbrowa Tarnowska

Area
  - Total: 113.43 km^{2} (43.80 sq mi)

Population (2006)
  - Total: 20,180
  - Density: 177.9/km^{2} (460.8/sq mi)
  - Urban: 11,259
  - Rural: 8,921
- Website: http://www.dabrowa.okay.pl/

Gmina Dąbrowa Tarnowska is an urban-rural gmina (administrative district) in Dąbrowa County, Lesser Poland Voivodeship, in southern Poland. Its seat is the town of Dąbrowa Tarnowska, which lies approximately 76 kilometres (47 mi) east of the regional capital Kraków.

The gmina covers an area of 113.43 square kilometres (43.8 sq mi), and as of 2006 its total population is 20,180 (out of which the population of Dąbrowa Tarnowska amounts to 11,259, and the population of the rural part of the gmina is 8,921).

== Villages ==
Apart from the town of Dąbrowa Tarnowska, Gmina Dąbrowa Tarnowska contains the villages and settlements of Brnik, Gruszów Mały, Gruszów Wielki, Laskówka Chorąska, Lipiny, Lipiny, Morzychna, Nieczajna Dolna, Nieczajna Górna, Smęgorzów, Sutków, Szarwark and Żelazówka.

== Neighbouring gminas ==
Gmina Dąbrowa Tarnowska is bordered by the gminas of Lisia Góra, Mędrzechów, Olesno, Radgoszcz, Szczucin and Żabno.
