= Mędrzechów =

- Village
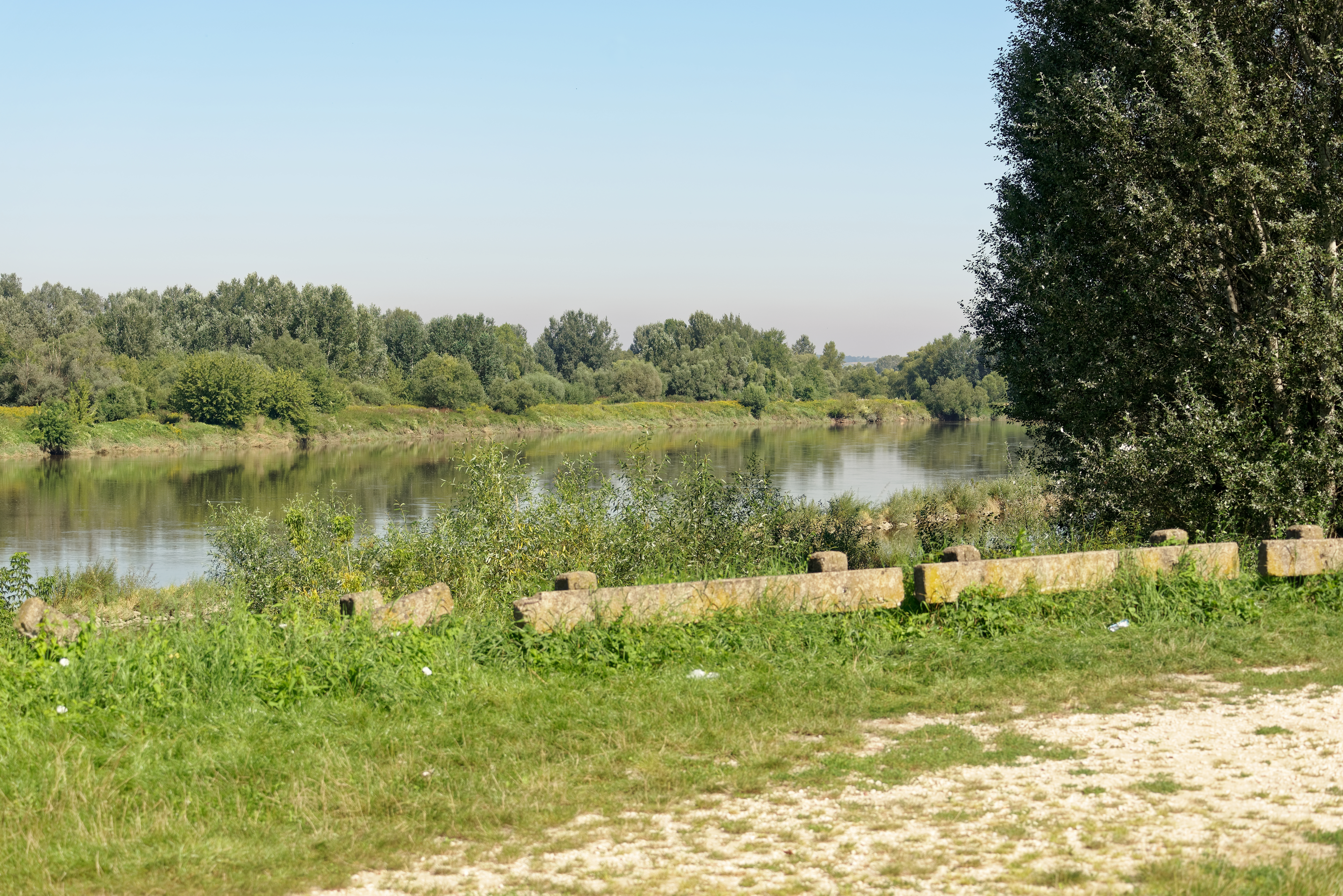
- Vistula in Mędrzechów

- Location within Poland
- Coordinates: 50°17′N 20°56′E
- Country: Poland
- Voivodeship: Lesser Poland
- County: Dąbrowa
- Gmina: Mędrzechów
- Population: 1,300

Mędrzechów [mɛnˈdʐɛxuf] is a village in Dąbrowa County, Lesser Poland Voivodeship, in southern Poland. It is the seat of the gmina (administrative district) called Gmina Mędrzechów.
