= Niwki, Dąbrowa County =

Niwki
- Village
- Location within Poland
- Coordinates: 50°13′N 20°51′E
- Country: Poland
- Voivodeship: Lesser Poland
- County: Dąbrowa
- Gmina: Olesno
- Population: 221

Niwki [ˈnifki] is a village in the administrative district of Gmina Olesno, within Dąbrowa County, Lesser Poland Voivodeship, in southern Poland.

== See also ==
- Dąbrowa County
