= Podborze, Lesser Poland Voivodeship =

Podborze
- Village
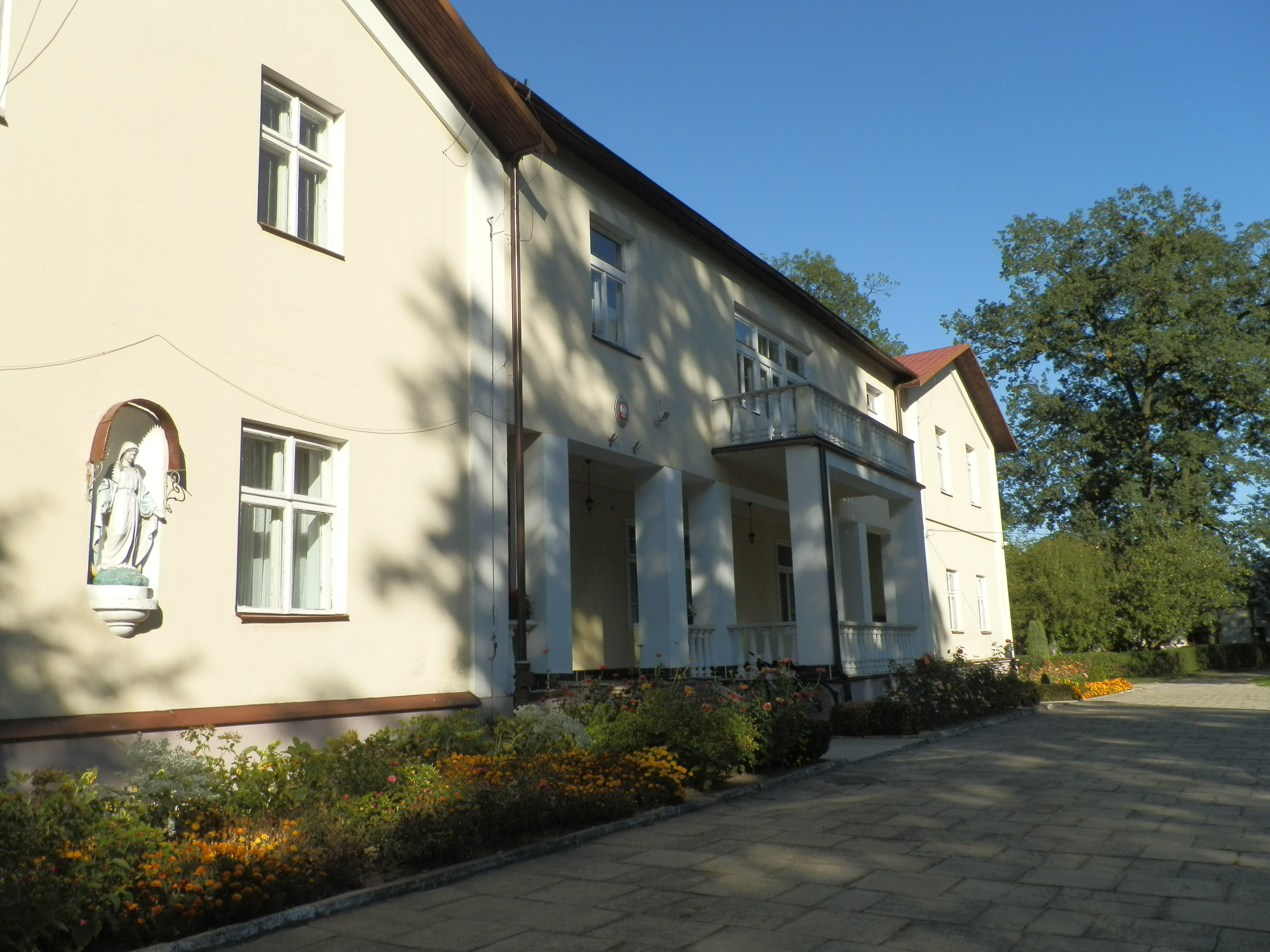
- Manor house

- Location within Poland
- Coordinates: 50°13′N 20°57′E
- Country: Poland
- Voivodeship: Lesser Poland
- County: Dąbrowa
- Gmina: Olesno

Podborze [pɔdˈbɔʐɛ] is a village in the administrative district of Gmina Olesno, within Dąbrowa County, Lesser Poland Voivodeship, in southern Poland.
