= Załuże, Lesser Poland Voivodeship =

Załuże
- Village
- Location within Poland
- Coordinates: 50°18′03″N 21°09′49″E
- Country: Poland
- Voivodeship: Lesser Poland
- County: Dąbrowa
- Gmina: Szczucin

Załuże [zaˈwuʐɛ] is a village in the administrative district of Gmina Szczucin, within Dąbrowa County, Lesser Poland Voivodeship, in southern Poland.
