= Bolesław, Dąbrowa County =

Bolesław
- Village
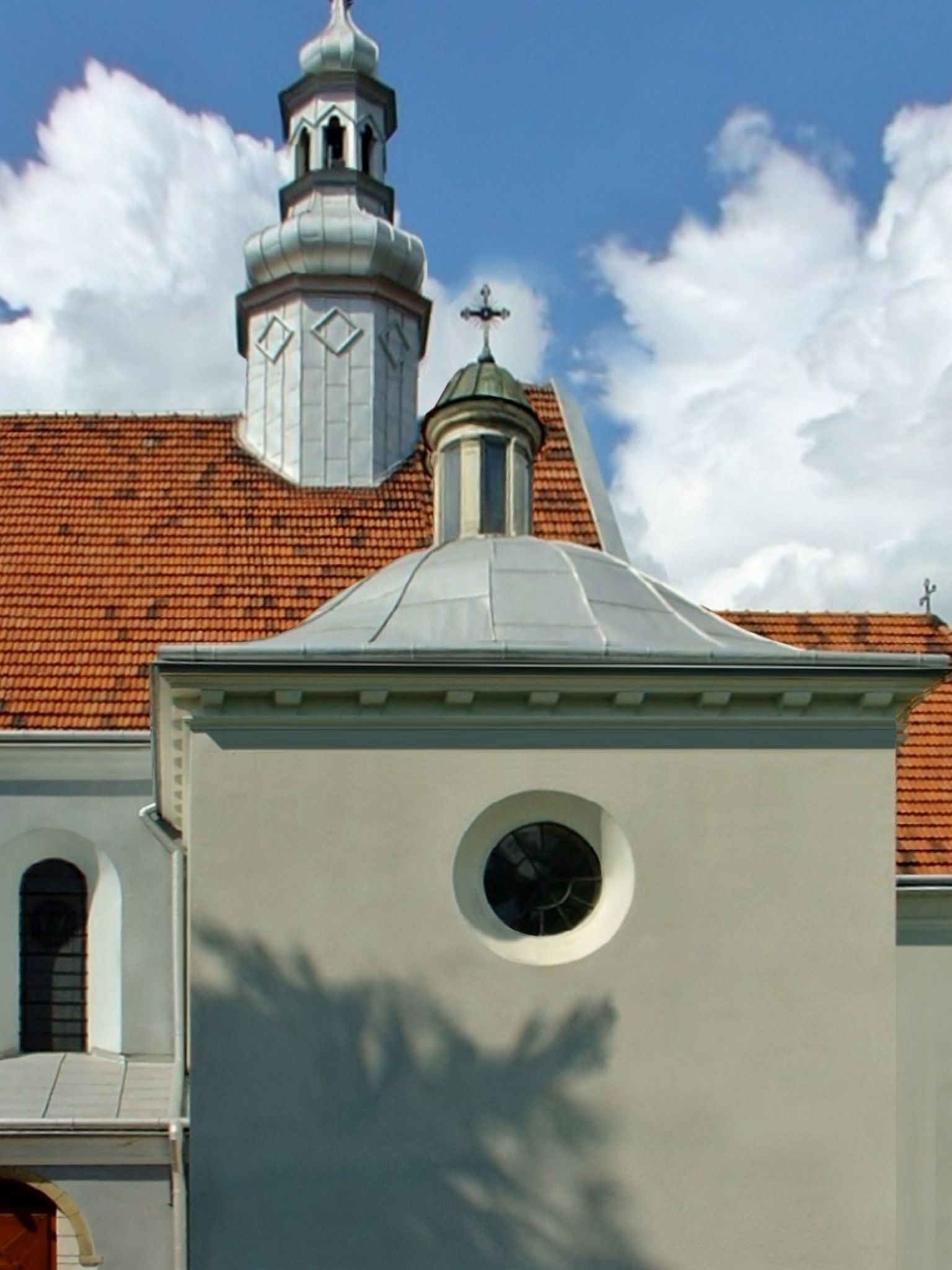
- Catholic church

- Location within Poland
- Coordinates: 50°17′N 20°54′E
- Country: Poland
- Voivodeship: Lesser Poland
- County: Dąbrowa
- Gmina: Bolesław

Bolesław [bɔˈlɛswaf] is a village in Dąbrowa County, Lesser Poland Voivodeship, in southern Poland. It is the seat of the gmina (administrative district) called Gmina Bolesław.
