= Lipiny, Lesser Poland Voivodeship =

Lipiny
- Village
- Location within Poland
- Coordinates: 50°7′4″N 21°3′22″E
- Country: Poland
- Voivodeship: Lesser Poland
- County: Dąbrowa
- Gmina: Dąbrowa Tarnowska
- Population: 570

Lipiny [liˈpinɨ] is a village in the administrative district of Gmina Dąbrowa Tarnowska, within Dąbrowa County, Lesser Poland Voivodeship, in southern Poland.
