= Brnik =

Brnik may refer to:

- Brnik, Poland, a village in Poland
- Brnik, Republic of Macedonia, a village in Republic of Macedonia

or:

- Zgornji Brnik, a village in Slovenia
- Spodnji Brnik, a village in Slovenia

or:

- Ljubljana Airport, an airport in Slovenia
