= Świebodzin, Dąbrowa County =

Świebodzin
- Village
- Location within Poland
- Coordinates: 50°15′20″N 20°54′03″E
- Country: Poland
- Voivodeship: Lesser Poland
- County: Dąbrowa
- Gmina: Bolesław

Świebodzin (Polish pronunciation: [ɕfjɛˈbɔd͡ʑin]) is a village in the administrative district of Gmina Bolesław, within Dąbrowa County, Lesser Poland Voivodeship, in southern Poland.
