= Lipiany (disambiguation) =

Lipiany may refer to the following places in Poland:

- Lipiany, a town in West Pomeranian Voivodeship
- Lipiany, Lower Silesian Voivodeship, a village in Gmina Bolesławiec, Lower Silesian Voivodeship

== See also ==
- Lipan (disambiguation)
- Lipany (disambiguation)
- Lipiny (disambiguation)
