= Leonard Weber =

Polish beekeeper

- Born: 22 October 1889; Kozubów, Austria-Hungary (now Poland)
- Died: 16 September 1975 (aged 85); Wrocław, Poland
- Known for: Behaviour and perception of bees
- Awards: Gold Cross of Merit; Order of Polonia Restituta
- Scientific career
- Fields: Beekeeping
- Workplaces: Academy of Veterinary Medicine in Lviv, University and Polytechnic Institute in Wrocław

Leonard Weber (22 October 1889 — 16 September 1975) was a Polish beekeeper with diverse interests: he studied architecture in Italy, was fond of astronomy, was a polyglot, and was passionate about artificial languages (Esperanto, Ido).

== Biography ==
From 1921-1939, Weber was the editor-in-chief of the monthly "Bartnik Postępowy" published in Lviv. During these years, he published many books on the topic of beekeeping, including: "American premium hives" (1919), "Beekeeping" (1920), "Year-round farming in the apiary" and "Diseases and pests of bees" (1923), "How to build the cheapest and simplest hive and how to manage it" (1925), "Bee and Hive" (1930), "Apiary" (1934). In 1937, he also published a textbook on the study of the Ido language. In 1944, after the Nazis left Lviv, he published the book "Teaching for Beekeepers".

After the war, together with almost the entire Polish scientific and teaching staff of the Academy of Veterinary Medicine in Lviv, he moved to Wroclaw. As an associate professor, together with his assistant Rudolf Niemczuk, he created the Department of Beekeeping and Diseases at the newly established Veterinary Faculty of the University and Polytechnic Institute. Weber became its manager until 1951, when it was transformed into an agricultural school. There he headed a bee-growing plant, which he occupied until his retirement in 1961.

== Selected books ==
- Ule nadstawkowe amerykańskie (American premium hives, 1919)
- Hodowla pszczół według nowoczesnych zasad pszczelnictwa z szczególnym uwzględnieniem gospodarki w ulach amerykańskich czyli nadstawkowych (Breeding bees according to modern principles of beekeeping, with particular emphasis on management in American hives, i.e. top hives, 1920)
- Wyrób miodów pitnych. Praktyczne wskazówki sycenia miodów pitnych oraz win miodowo-owocowych (Mead production. Practical tips for filling meads and honey-fruit wines, 1920)
- Całoroczna gospodarka w pasiece. Encyklopedia pszczelnictwa (Year-round management in the apiary. Encyclopedia of beekeeping, 1923)
- Choroby i szkodniki pszczół (Bee diseases and pests, 1923)
- Jak zbudować najtańszy i najprostszy ul i jak w nim gospodarować (How to build the cheapest and simplest hive and how to manage it, 1925)
- Pasieka. Ilustrowany podręcznik o hodowli pszczół dla zysku ze szczególnym uwzględnieniem gospodarki w ulu składanym (Apiary. An illustrated manual on breeding bees for profit, with particular emphasis on the management of a foldable hive, 1925)
- Wyrób win i miodów pitnych (Production of wines and meads, 1927)
- Pszczoła i ul (Bee and hive, 1930)
- Pasieka (Apiary, 1934)
- Nauka światowego języka pomocniczego reform-Esperanto (system IDO) (Learning the world's reform auxiliary language - Esperanto, 1937)
- Nauki dla pszczelników (Teachings for beekeepers, 1944)
- Ul składany, konstrukcja ula i całoroczna gospodarka w nim (Foldable hive, hive structure and year-round management, 1950)
- Selekcja i wychów matek pszczelich (Selection and rearing of queen bees, 1956)
- Pszczoły i ich produkty (Bees and their products, 1959)
