= Lipany (disambiguation) =

Lipany is a town in the Prešov Region in Slovakia.

Lipany may also refer to:

- Lipany (Vitice), a village in the Central Bohemian Region, Czech Republic
  - Battle of Lipany, fought near Lipany in 1434 during the Hussite Wars
- Lipany (crater), on Mars
- ŠK Odeva Lipany, an association football club based in Lipany, Slovakia

== See also ==
- Lipan (disambiguation)
- Lipiany (disambiguation)
- Lipiny (disambiguation)
