= Olesno, Lesser Poland Voivodeship =

Olesno
- Village
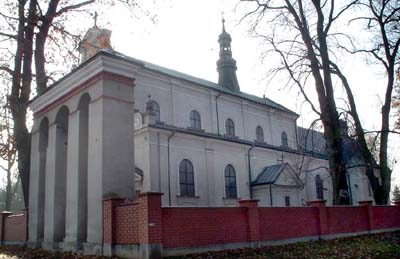
- Saint Catherine Church

- Location within Poland
- Coordinates: 50°13′N 20°56′E
- Country: Poland
- Voivodeship: Lesser Poland
- County: Dąbrowa
- Gmina: Olesno
- Population: 1,708

Olesno [ɔˈlɛsnɔ] is a village in Dąbrowa County, Lesser Poland Voivodeship, in southern Poland. It is the seat of the gmina (administrative district) called Gmina Olesno.
