= Lipan =

Lipan may refer to:

- Lipan Apache people, an indigenous people of Texas and northern Mexico
  - Lipan language
- Lipan, Texas, a city
  - Lipan Independent School District
- Mereta, Texas or Lipan, an unincorporated community
- Lipan Point, a promontory of the Grand Canyon
- Lipán M3, an Argentine Army unmanned aerial vehicle
- USS Lipan (AT-85), a US Navy tug
- Battle of Lipany or Lipan, a 1434 battle of the Hussite Wars, fought near Prague

== People with the surname ==
- Ovidiu Lipan (born 1953), Romanian drummer
- Teresa Lipan, a character in the Syphon Filter video game series
- Victoria Lipan, the protagonist of The Hatchet, a 1930 novel by Mihail Sadoveanu

== See also ==
- Lipany (disambiguation)
- Lipiany (disambiguation)
- Lipiny (disambiguation)
