= Zabrnie, Lesser Poland Voivodeship =

Zabrnie
- Village
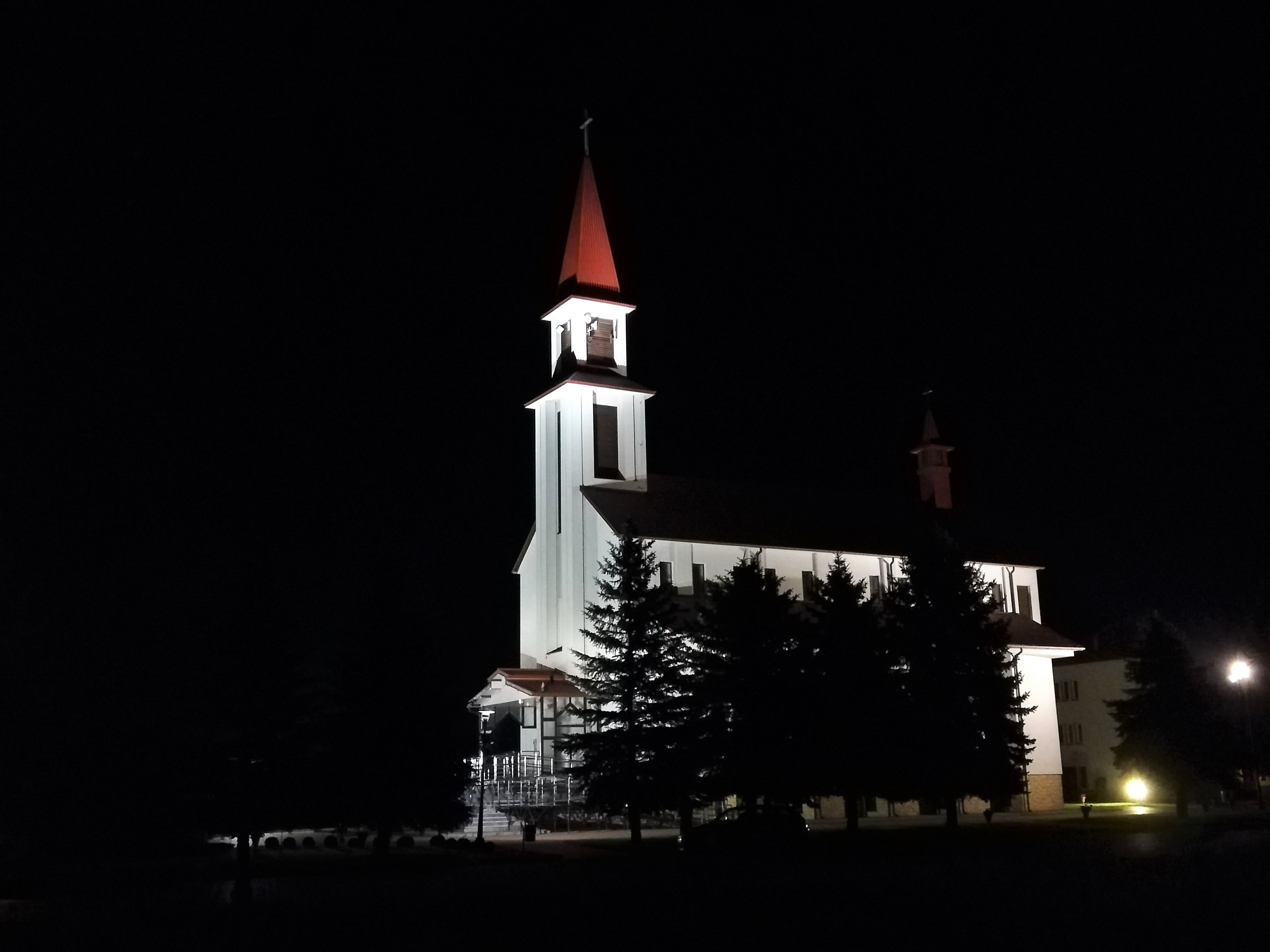
- Catholic church

- Location within Poland
- Coordinates: 50°16′43″N 21°6′5″E
- Country: Poland
- Voivodeship: Lesser Poland
- County: Mielec
- Gmina: Wadowice Górne

Zabrnie [ˈzabrɲɛ] is a village in the administrative district of Gmina Wadowice Górne, within Mielec County, Lesser Poland Voivodeship, in southern Poland.
