= Dąbrowa Tarnowska =

Town in Lesser Poland Voivodeship, Poland

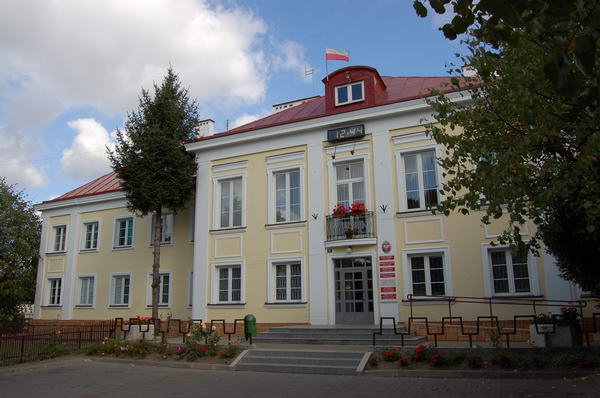
- Town Hall

- Coat of arms

- Location within Poland
- Coordinates: 50°10′N 20°59′E
- Country: Poland
- Voivodeship: Lesser Poland
- County: Dąbrowa
- Gmina: Dąbrowa Tarnowska
- Established: 16th century
- Town rights: 1693

Government
  - Mayor: Krzysztof Kaczmarski

Area
  - Total: 23.07 km^{2} (8.91 sq mi)
- Elevation: 120 m (390 ft)

Population (31 December 2021)
  - Total: 11,828
  - Density: 512.7/km^{2} (1,328/sq mi)
- Time zone: UTC+1 (CET)
  - Summer (DST): UTC+2 (CEST)
- Postal code: 33-200
- Area code: +48 14
- Car plates: KDA
- Website: http://www.dabrowatar.pl/.

Dąbrowa Tarnowska [dɔmˈbrɔva tarˈnɔfska]is a town in southern Poland, in Lesser Poland Voivodeship, about 16 kilometres (10 mi) north of Tarnów. It is the capital of Dąbrowa County. As of December 2021, the town has a population of 11,828.

== Etymology ==
The name of the town comes from oak groves, called dąbrowy in Polish, which were abundant here in the past. Dąbrowa used to be called Dambrawa Wielka (Dambrawa Magna) as well as Dobrowa, and finally the adjective “Tarnowska” was added to it, to distinguish it from Dąbrowa Górnicza and Dąbrowa Białostocka.

== Geography ==
Dąbrowa lies on the Bren river, on the boundary of two geographic regions, the Carpathian Foothills and the Sandomierz Basin.

== History ==
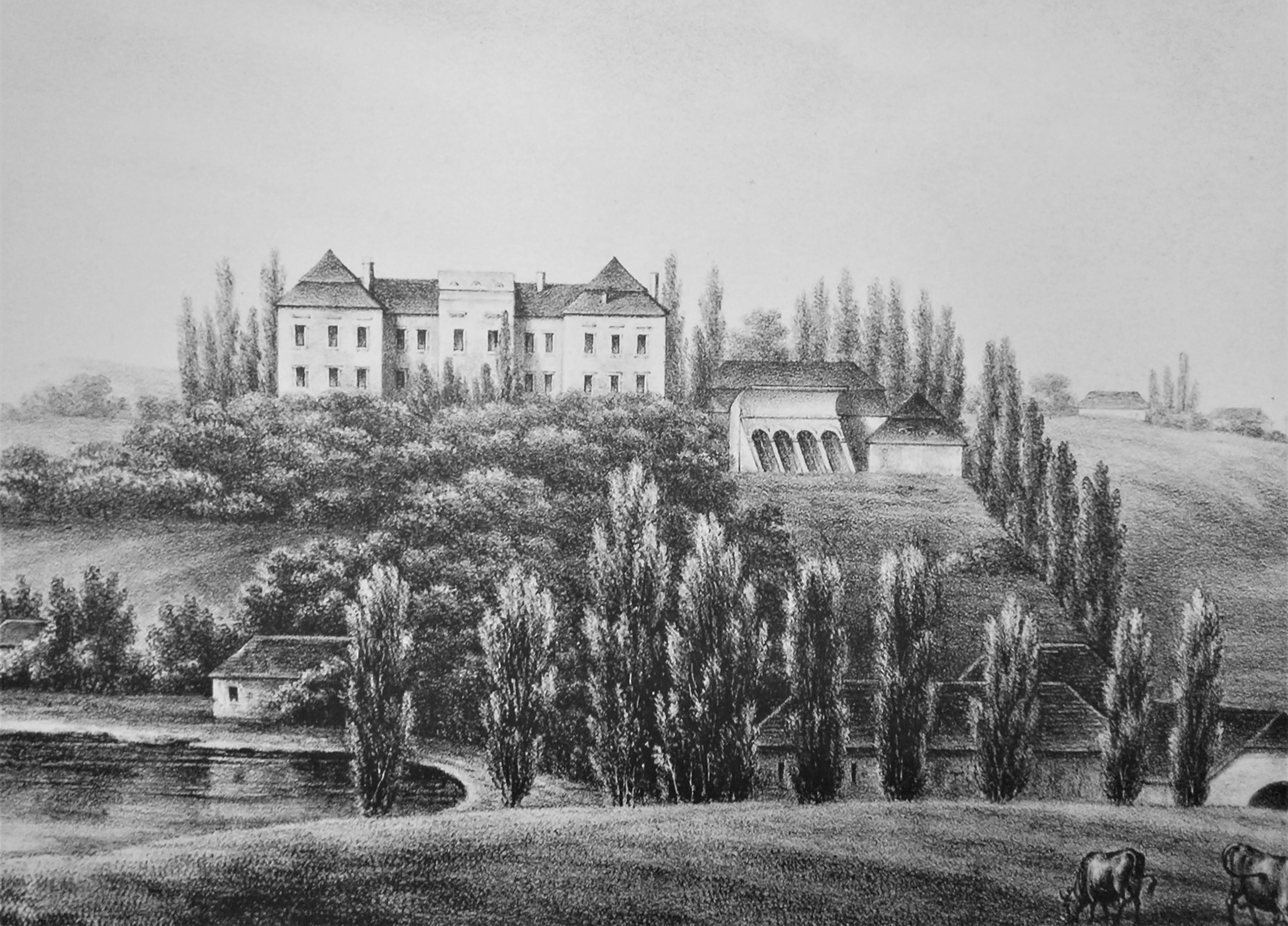
Lubomirski Castle in the mid-19th century

Dąbrowa Tarnowska was first mentioned as a parish village in 1326. At that time, it already was a large village, which belonged to the noble Ligeza family, and had a mill, fish farm, 60 agricultural farms and a folwark. In 1614, a new parish church was built by Mikolaj Ligeza who in the 1630s also built a defensive palace (palazzo in fortezza), protected by the Bagienica river. The palace was square shaped, with a rampart and four bastions. In 1683-1693, Michał Lubomirski built a new, Baroque palace, and as a result, the old palace ceased to be a family residence, and was turned into a brewery. In the Kingdom of Poland and the Polish–Lithuanian Commonwealth, Dąbrowa belonged to the Sandomierz Voivodeship of the Lesser Poland Province.

Dąbrowa Tarnowska was granted town charter probably in 1693, and the town was developed east of the Lubomirski palace. In 1771, a new, large church was built. Following the First Partition of Poland in 1772, the town became part of Austrian Galicia, where it remained until 1918. In 1846, the Lubomirski palace burned in a fire, after which it was never rebuilt. A post-office named Dombrowa was opened in 1858. The town was part of the Austria side after the compromise of 1867, head of the Dabrowa district, one of the 78 Bezirkshauptmannschaften in Austrian Galicia province (Crown land). In 1918, Poland regained independence and control of the town. Following the German-Soviet invasion of Poland, which started World War II in September 1939, the town was occupied by Germany.

In 1948-1965, a church was built in the location of the palace, all that remains of the complex is its main gate. In 1906, the rail line from Tarnów to Szczucin was opened, and in the Second Polish Republic, Dąbrowa was part of the Kraków Voivodeship.

From 1975 to 1998, it was administratively part of the Tarnów Voivodeship.

== Landmarks ==
Dąbrowa has ruins of a Baroque palace of the Lubomirski family, as well as a 19th-century synagogue.

== Sports ==
The town is a home to a football club Dabrovia Dąbrowa Tarnowska (established in 1922), which plays in the regional league, the sixth level of Polish football league system.

== See also ==
- Dombrov (Hasidic dynasty)

== Sources ==
- History of Dabrowa at shtetl.org.pl
- Population data from the official website
