= Dąbrowa County =

Dąbrowa County Powiat dąbrowski
- County
- Flag Coat of arms

- Location within the voivodeship

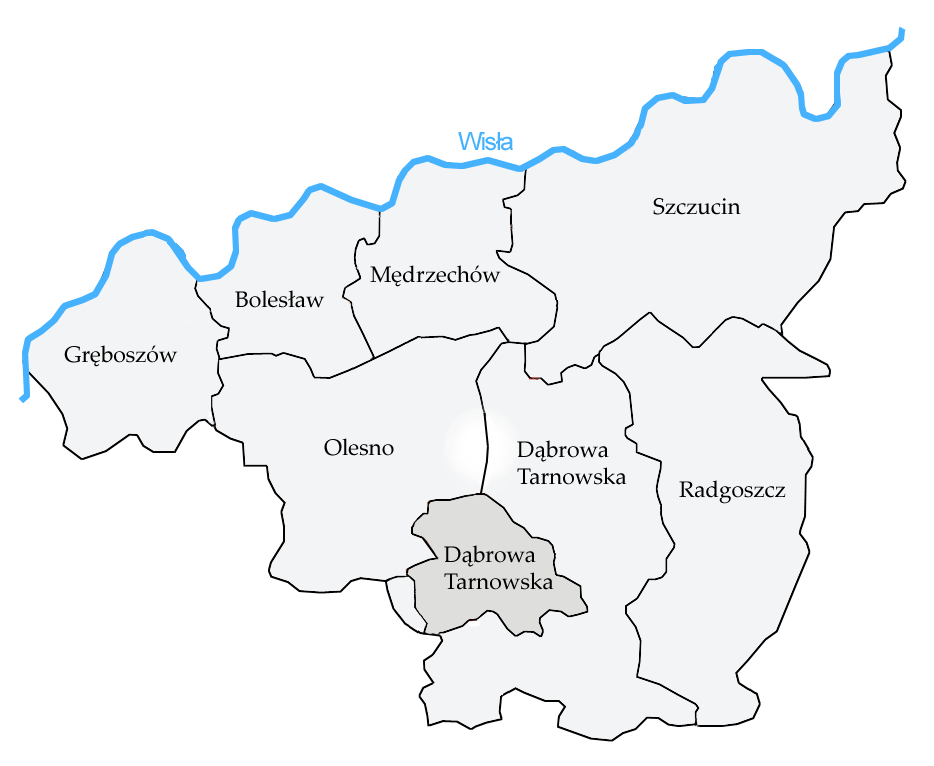
- Division into gminas
- Coordinates (Dąbrowa Tarnowska): 50°10′N 20°59′E
- Country: Poland
- Voivodeship: Lesser Poland
- Seat: Dąbrowa Tarnowska
- Gminas: Total 7: Gmina Bolesław; Gmina Dąbrowa Tarnowska; Gmina Gręboszów; Gmina Mędrzechów; Gmina Olesno; Gmina Radgoszcz; Gmina Szczucin

Area
  - Total: 530.0 km^{2} (204.6 sq mi)

Population (2019)
  - Total: 59,227
  - Density: 111.7/km^{2} (289.4/sq mi)
  - Urban: 16,046
  - Rural: 43,181
- Car plates: KDA
- Website: www.powiatdabrowski.pl

Dąbrowa County (Polish: powiat dąbrowski) is a unit of territorial administration and local government (powiat) in Lesser Poland Voivodeship, southern Poland. It was created on 1 January 1999 as a result of the Polish local government reforms passed in 1998. Its administrative seat is the town of Dąbrowa Tarnowska, which lies 76 kilometres (47 mi) east of the regional capital Kraków. Its only other town is Szczucin, lying 16 km (9.9 mi) north of Dąbrowa Tarnowska.

The county covers an area of 530.0 square kilometres (204.6 sq mi). As of 2019 its total population is 59,227, out of which the population of Dąbrowa Tarnowska is 11,889, that of Szczucin is 4,157, and the rural population is 43,181.

== Neighbouring counties ==
Dąbrowa County is bordered by Busko County and Staszów County to the north, Mielec County and Dębica County to the east, Tarnów County to the south, and Kazimierza County to the west.

== Administrative division ==
The county is subdivided into seven gminas (two urban-rural and five rural). These are listed in the following table, in descending order of population.

Gmina	Type	Area (km^{2})	Population (2019)	Seat
Gmina Dąbrowa Tarnowska	urban-rural	113.4	21,262	Dąbrowa Tarnowska
Gmina Szczucin	urban-rural	119.8	13,134	Szczucin
Gmina Olesno	rural	77.8	7,937	Olesno
Gmina Radgoszcz	rural	88.3	7,434	Radgoszcz
Gmina Mędrzechów	rural	43.7	3,445	Mędrzechów
Gmina Gręboszów	rural	48.6	3,354	Gręboszów
Gmina Bolesław	rural	35.4	2,661	Bolesław

== See also ==
- List of villages in Dąbrowa County
