= Góry Wysokie =

- Village
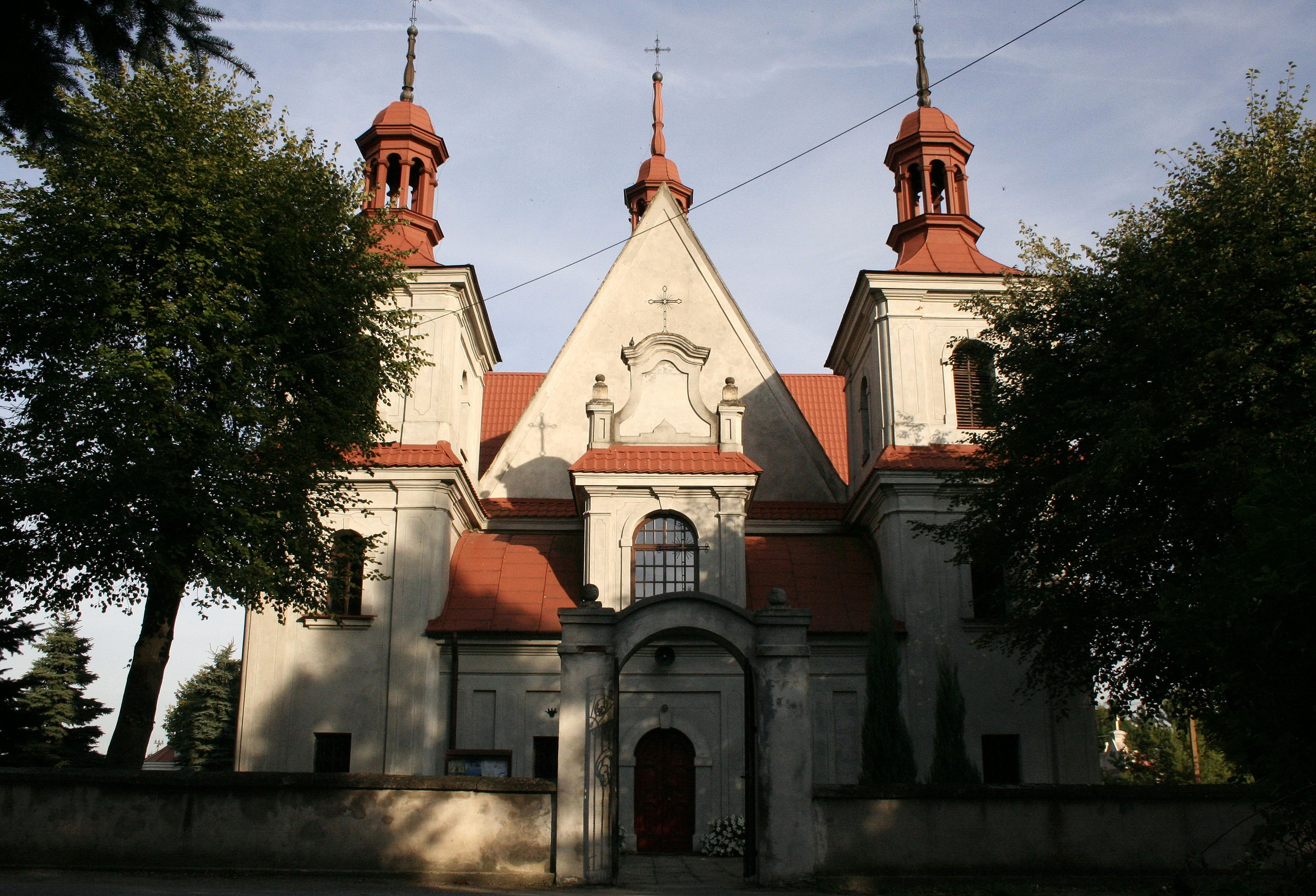
- Our Lady of Sorrows church in Góry Wysokie

- Location within Poland
- Coordinates: 50°44′40″N 21°45′34″E
- Country: Poland
- Voivodeship: Świętokrzyskie
- County: Sandomierz
- Gmina: Dwikozy
- Time zone: UTC+1 (CET)
  - Summer (DST): UTC+2 (CEST)
- Vehicle registration: TSA

Góry Wysokie [ˈɡurɨ vɨˈsɔkʲɛ] is a village in the administrative district of Gmina Dwikozy, within Sandomierz County, Świętokrzyskie Voivodeship, in south-central Poland. It lies approximately 3 km (2 mi) north-west of Dwikozy, 7 km (4 mi) north of Sandomierz, and 82 km (51 mi) east of the regional capital Kielce.

== History ==
Góry Wysokie was a private village within the Polish Crown, owned by Polish nobility, administratively located in the Sandomierz Voivodeship in the Lesser Poland Province of the Kingdom of Poland.

During the German occupation of Poland (World War II), in March 1940, Germans murdered 117 Poles from the region in the forest of Góry Wysokie (see Nazi crimes against the Polish nation).
