= Gierlachów =

- Village
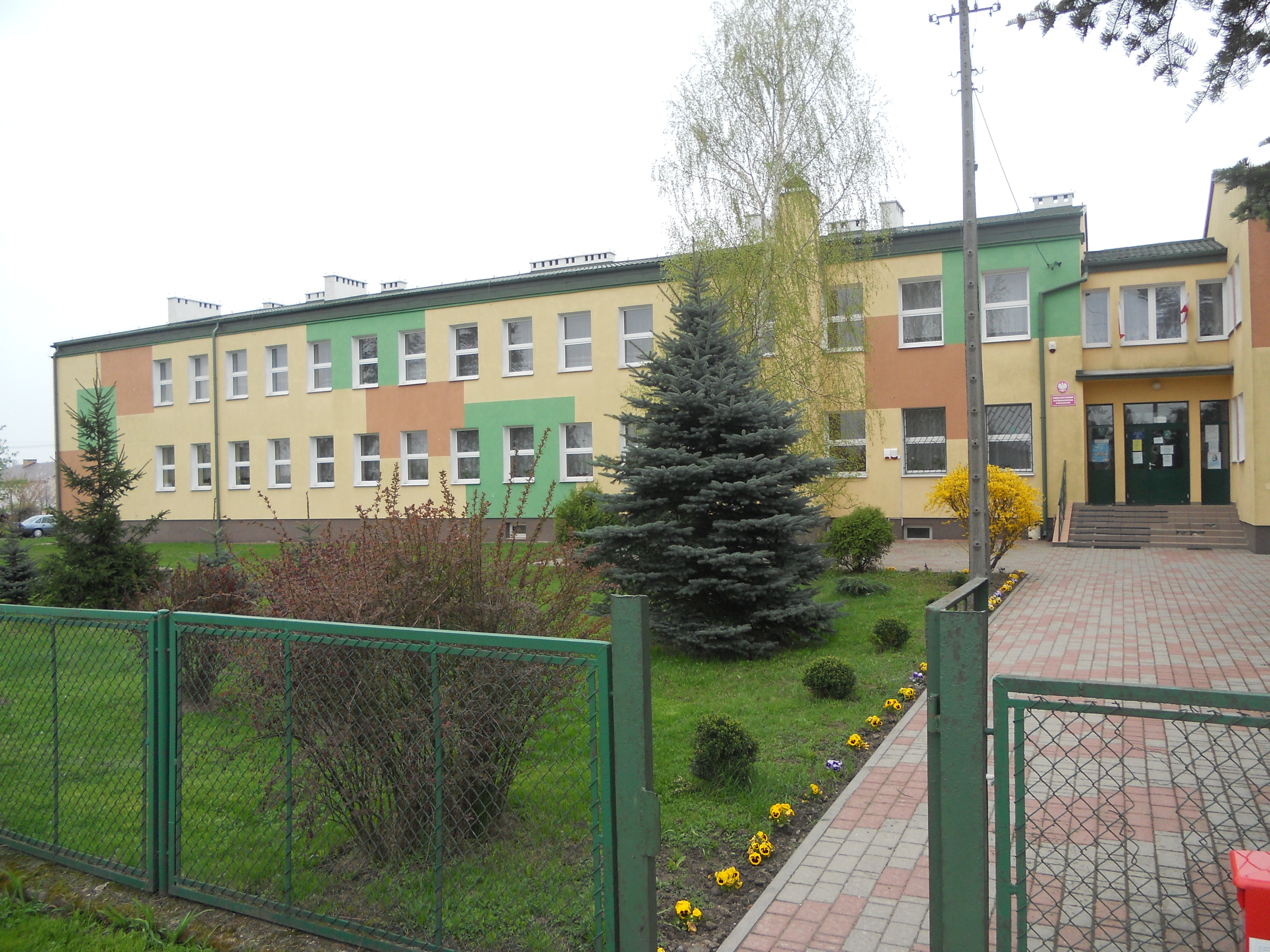

- Location within Poland
- Coordinates: 50°42′14″N 21°47′23″E
- Country: Poland
- Voivodeship: Świętokrzyskie
- County: Sandomierz
- Gmina: Dwikozy
- Population: 220

Gierlachów [ɡʲɛrˈlaxuf] is a village in the administrative district of Gmina Dwikozy, within Sandomierz County, Świętokrzyskie Voivodeship, in south-central Poland. It lies approximately 4 km (2 mi) south of Dwikozy, 4 km (2 mi) north-east of Sandomierz, and 85 km (53 mi) east of the regional capital Kielce.
