= Winiarki =

- Village
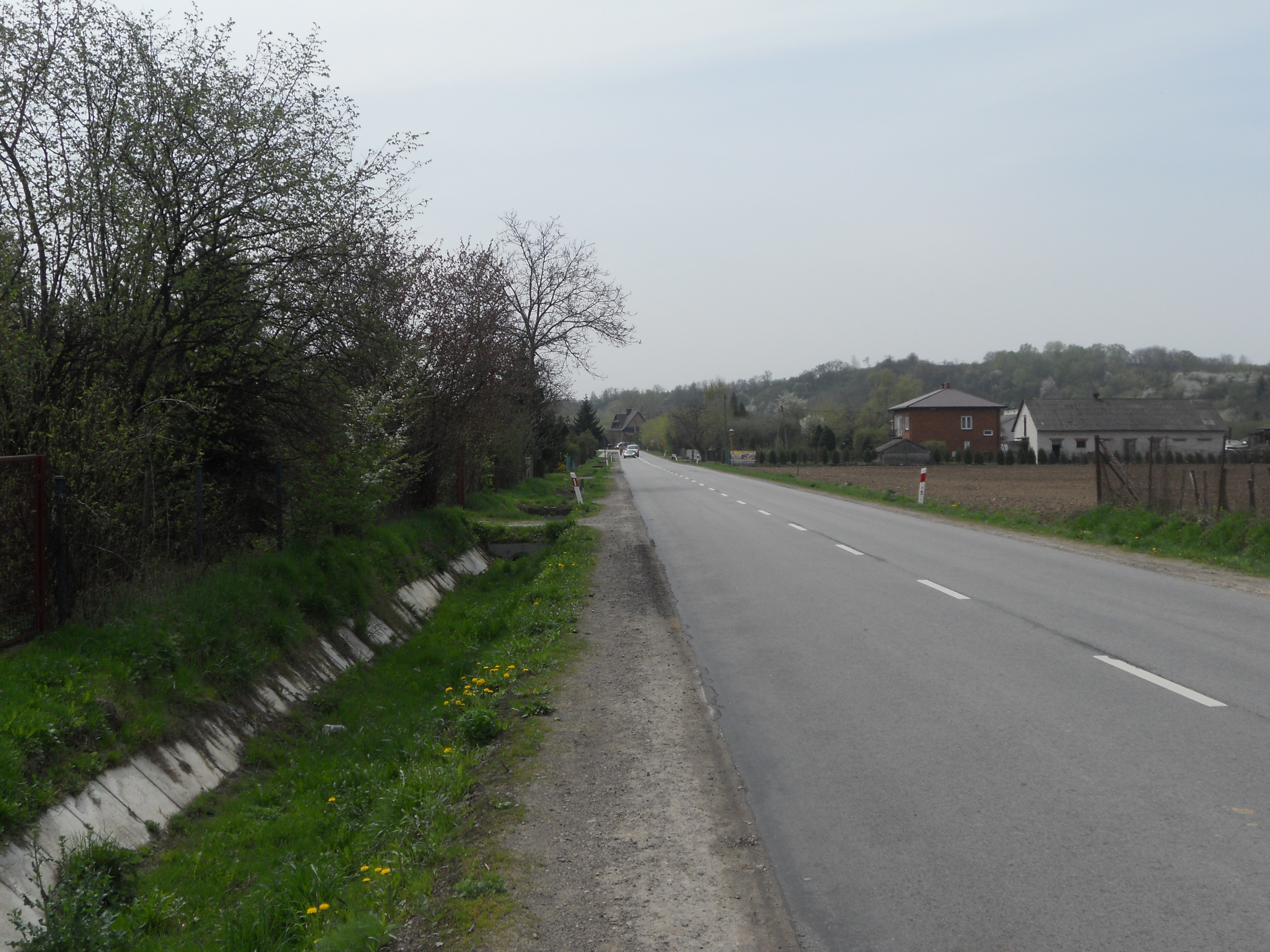

- Location within Poland
- Coordinates: 50°46′7″N 21°48′48″E
- Country: Poland
- Voivodeship: Świętokrzyskie
- County: Sandomierz
- Gmina: Dwikozy

Winiarki [viˈɲarki] is a village in the administrative district of Gmina Dwikozy, within Sandomierz County, Świętokrzyskie Voivodeship, in south-central Poland. It lies approximately 5 km (3 mi) north-east of Dwikozy, 11 km (7 mi) north-east of Sandomierz, and 86 km (53 mi) east of the regional capital Kielce.
