= Bożydar, Świętokrzyskie Voivodeship =

Bożydar
- Village
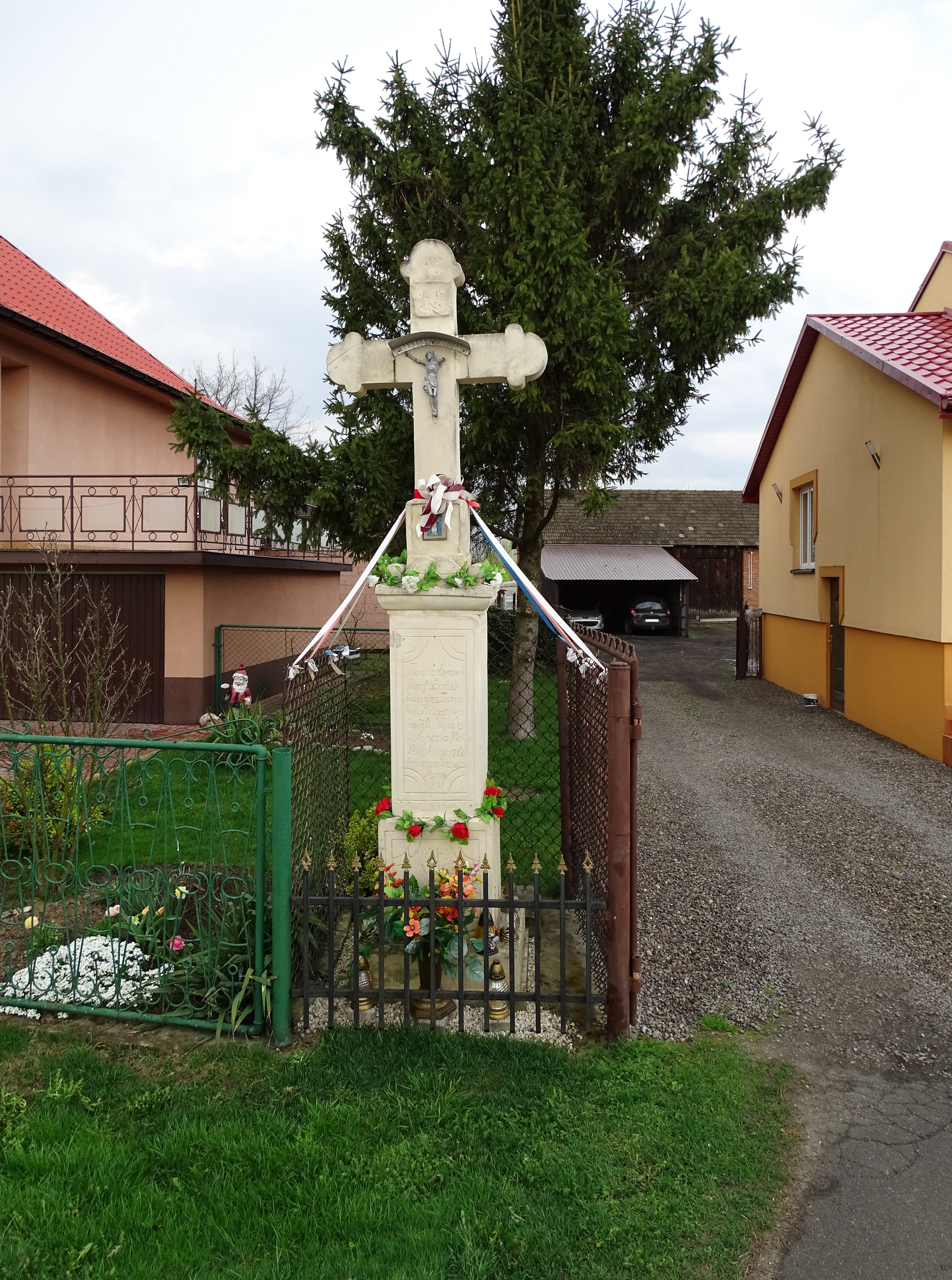
- The roadside shrine from 1866

- Location within Poland
- Coordinates: 50°43′44″N 21°49′11″E
- Country: Poland
- Voivodeship: Świętokrzyskie
- County: Sandomierz
- Gmina: Dwikozy
- Highest elevation: 150 m (490 ft)
- Lowest elevation: 140 m (460 ft)

Bożydar [bɔˈʐɨdar] is a village in the administrative district of Gmina Dwikozy, within Sandomierz County, Świętokrzyskie Voivodeship, in south-central Poland. It lies approximately 3 km (2 mi) east of Dwikozy, 8 km (5 mi) north-east of Sandomierz, and 87 km (54 mi) east of the regional capital Kielce.
