= Czermin =

Czermin may refer to the following places:

- Czermin, Kępno County in Greater Poland Voivodeship (west-central Poland)
- Czermin, Podkarpackie Voivodeship (south-east Poland)
- Czermin, Subcarpathian Voivodeship (south-east Poland)
- Czermin, Świętokrzyskie Voivodeship (south-central Poland)
- Czermin, Pleszew County in Greater Poland Voivodeship (west-central Poland)
