= Romanówka, Świętokrzyskie Voivodeship =

Romanówka
- Village
- Location within Poland
- Coordinates: 50°47′8″N 21°44′38″E
- Country: Poland
- Voivodeship: Świętokrzyskie
- County: Sandomierz
- Gmina: Dwikozy

Romanówka [rɔmaˈnufka] is a village in the administrative district of Gmina Dwikozy, within Sandomierz County, Świętokrzyskie Voivodeship, in south-central Poland. It lies approximately 7 km (4 mi) north-west of Dwikozy, 12 km (7 mi) north of Sandomierz, and 80 km (50 mi) east of the regional capital Kielce.
