= Battle of Słupcza =

- Part of the January Uprising
Date	8 February 1863
Location	near Słupcza and Dwikozy
Result	Russian victory

Belligerents
(Poland) Polish insurgents	Russian Empire

Commanders and leaders
Leon Frankowski; Antoni Zdanowicz	Lieutenant colonel Mednikov

Casualties and losses
66 dead 34 captured	Unknown

The Battle of Słupcza took place on 8 February 1863 near the village of Słupcza, Congress Poland, during the January Uprising. Up to 100 Polish insurgents commanded by Leon Frankowski and Antoni Zdanowicz clashed on that day with a unit of the Imperial Russian Army. The skirmish was won by the Russians.

In late January 1863, an insurgent unit, which was concentrated in Kurów, was forced to leave the town under Russian pressure. Polish unit marched to Sandomierz, but decided not to enter this town, and clashed with Russians near Słupcza. The Russians attacked with two infantry companies and a Cossack unit, defeating main insurgent force. Remnants of Polish insurgents fled to Dwikozy, where they were attacked again. All together, Poles lost 66 men - 28 died in Słupcza, and 38 perished in Dwikozy. Polish commandant Leon Frankowski, who was wounded, tried to hide in Sandomierz, but was quickly captured and sent to a prison in Lublin.

== Sources ==
- Stefan Kieniewicz: Powstanie styczniowe. Warszawa: Państwowe Wydawnictwo Naukowe, 1983. ISBN 83-01-03652-4.
