= Nowe Kichary =

- Village
- Location within Poland
- Coordinates: 50°44′25″N 21°44′24″E
- Country: Poland
- Voivodeship: Świętokrzyskie
- County: Sandomierz
- Gmina: Dwikozy

Nowe Kichary [ˈnɔvɛ kiˈxarɨ] is a village in the administrative district of Gmina Dwikozy, within Sandomierz County, Świętokrzyskie Voivodeship, in south-central Poland. It lies approximately 4 km (2 mi) west of Dwikozy, 7 km (4 mi) north of Sandomierz, and 81 km (50 mi) east of the regional capital Kielce.
