= Kamień Łukawski =

- Village
- Location within Poland
- Coordinates: 50°41′23″N 21°47′10″E
- Country: Poland
- Voivodeship: Świętokrzyskie
- County: Sandomierz
- Gmina: Dwikozy
- Population: 130

Kamień Łukawski (Polish: [ˈkamjɛj̃ wuˈkafskʲi]; literally "Rock Lukawski") is an estate in the administrative district of Gmina Dwikozy, within Sandomierz County, Świętokrzyskie Voivodeship, in south-central Poland. It lies approximately 5 km (3 mi) south of Dwikozy, 3 km (2 mi) east of Sandomierz, and 86 km (53 mi) east of the regional capital Kielce.

Kamień Łukawski
