= Nowy Garbów =

- Village
- Location within Poland
- Coordinates: 50°46′35″N 21°46′9″E
- Country: Poland
- Voivodeship: Świętokrzyskie
- County: Sandomierz
- Gmina: Dwikozy

Nowy Garbów [ˈnɔvɨ ˈɡarbuf] is a village in the administrative district of Gmina Dwikozy, within Sandomierz County, Świętokrzyskie Voivodeship, in south-central Poland. It lies approximately 6 km (4 mi) north of Dwikozy, 11 km (7 mi) north of Sandomierz, and 82 km (51 mi) east of the regional capital Kielce.
