= Powała of Taczew =

Polish knight

Pan Mikołaj Powała z Taczewa (lit. 'Sir Mikołaj Powała of Taczew') of Ogończyk coat of arms was a Polish knight in the Middle Ages. He took part in the Battle of Grunwald of 1410. He was also one of the Polish knights to represent the king at the tournament at Buda held to commemorate the signing of the Treaty of Lubowla.

While not as famous nor as symbolic as Zawisza Czarny, in the 20th century he was made a protagonist of several films, among them the 1970 Pierścień księżnej Anny (lit. 'Ring of Duchess Anna').

There is a hill (mound) named after him outside Taczew. However his Castle is now in ruins. Descendants of Pan Mikołaj Powała z Taczewa also fought in the battles for Vienna in Austria. Their family coat of arms is engraved in the Cathedral of Vienna.
