= Szczytniki, Sandomierz County =

Szczytniki
- Village
- Location within Poland
- Coordinates: 50°44′33″N 21°49′56″E
- Country: Poland
- Voivodeship: Świętokrzyskie
- County: Sandomierz
- Gmina: Dwikozy
- Elevation: 140 m (460 ft)

Szczytniki [ʂt͡ʂɨtˈniki] is a village in the administrative district of Gmina Dwikozy, within Sandomierz County, Świętokrzyskie Voivodeship, in south-central Poland. It lies approximately 4 km (2 mi) east of Dwikozy, 9 km (6 mi) north-east of Sandomierz, and 87 km (54 mi) east of the regional capital Kielce.
