= Gałkowice =

- Village
- Location within Poland
- Coordinates: 50°45′43″N 21°43′48″E
- Country: Poland
- Voivodeship: Świętokrzyskie
- County: Sandomierz
- Gmina: Dwikozy

Gałkowice [ɡau̯kɔˈvit͡sɛ] is a village in the administrative district of Gmina Dwikozy, within Sandomierz County, Świętokrzyskie Voivodeship, in south-central Poland. It lies approximately 6 km (4 mi) north-west of Dwikozy, 9 km (6 mi) north of Sandomierz, and 80 km (50 mi) east of the regional capital Kielce.
