= Stary Garbów =

- Village
- Location within Poland
- Coordinates: 50°46′26″N 21°46′14″E
- Country: Poland
- Voivodeship: Świętokrzyskie
- County: Sandomierz
- Gmina: Dwikozy
- Population: 224

Stary Garbów [ˈstarɨ ˈɡarbuf] is a village in the administrative district of Gmina Dwikozy, within Sandomierz County, Świętokrzyskie Voivodeship, in south-central Poland. It lies approximately 5 km (3 mi) north of Dwikozy, 11 km (7 mi) north of Sandomierz, and 83 km (52 mi) east of the regional capital Kielce.

The village is the hometown of Zawisza Czarny (c. 1379–1428), a Polish knight and national hero.
