= Stare Kichary =

- Village
- Location within Poland
- Coordinates: 50°45′23″N 21°44′20″E
- Country: Poland
- Voivodeship: Świętokrzyskie
- County: Sandomierz
- Gmina: Dwikozy

Stare Kichary [ˈstarɛ kiˈxarɨ] is a village in the administrative district of Gmina Dwikozy, within Sandomierz County, Świętokrzyskie Voivodeship, in south-central Poland. It lies approximately 5 km (3 mi) north-west of Dwikozy, 9 km (6 mi) north of Sandomierz, and 81 km (50 mi) east of the regional capital Kielce.
