= Winiary, Sandomierz County =

Winiary
- Village
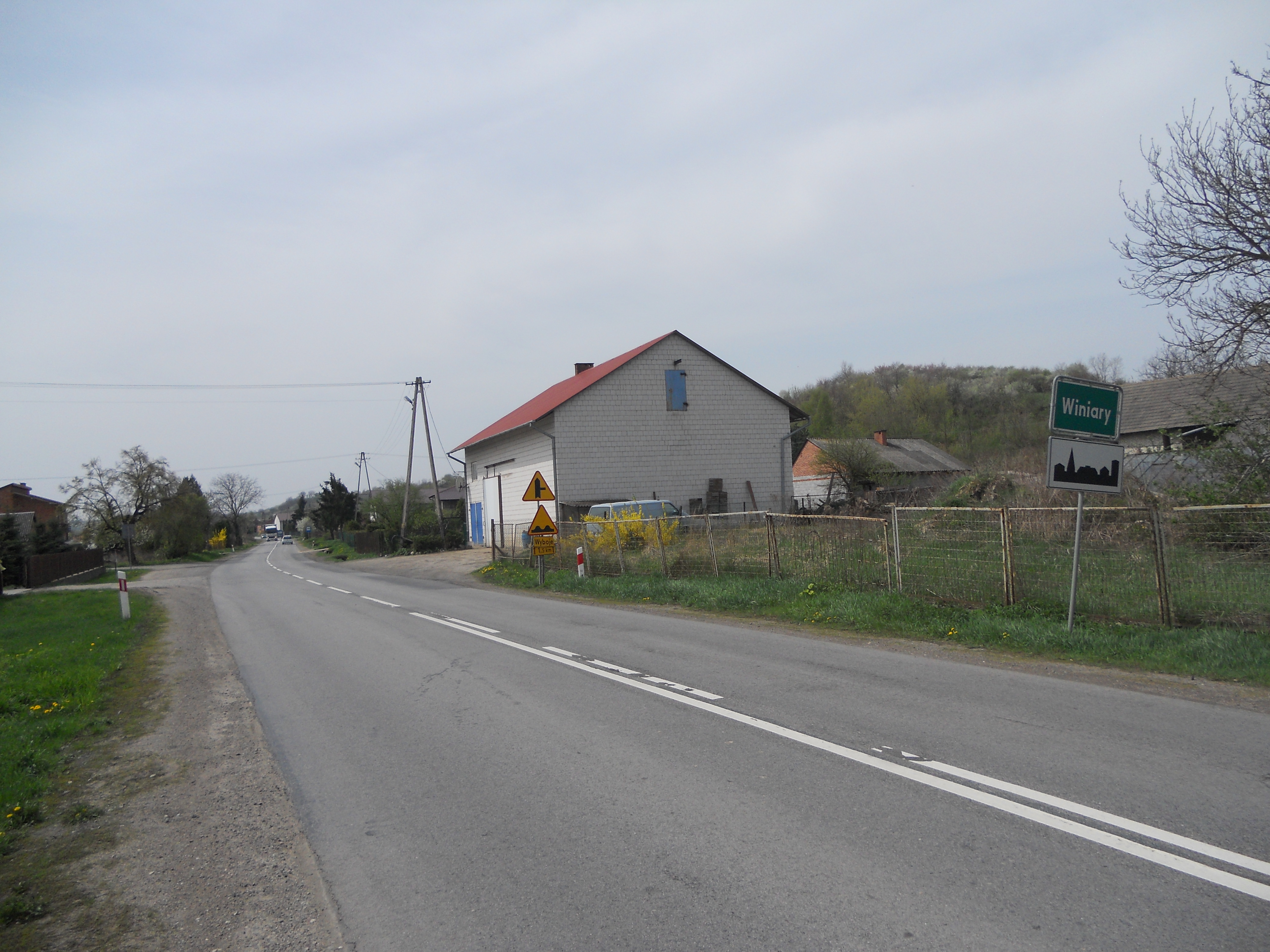

- Location within Poland
- Coordinates: 50°46′40″N 21°49′41″E
- Country: Poland
- Voivodeship: Świętokrzyskie
- County: Sandomierz
- Gmina: Dwikozy

Winiary [viˈɲarɨ] is a village in the administrative district of Gmina Dwikozy, within Sandomierz County, Świętokrzyskie Voivodeship, in south-central Poland. It lies approximately 6 km (4 mi) north-east of Dwikozy, 12 km (7 mi) north-east of Sandomierz, and 86 km (53 mi) east of the regional capital Kielce.
