= Rzeczyca Mokra =

- Village
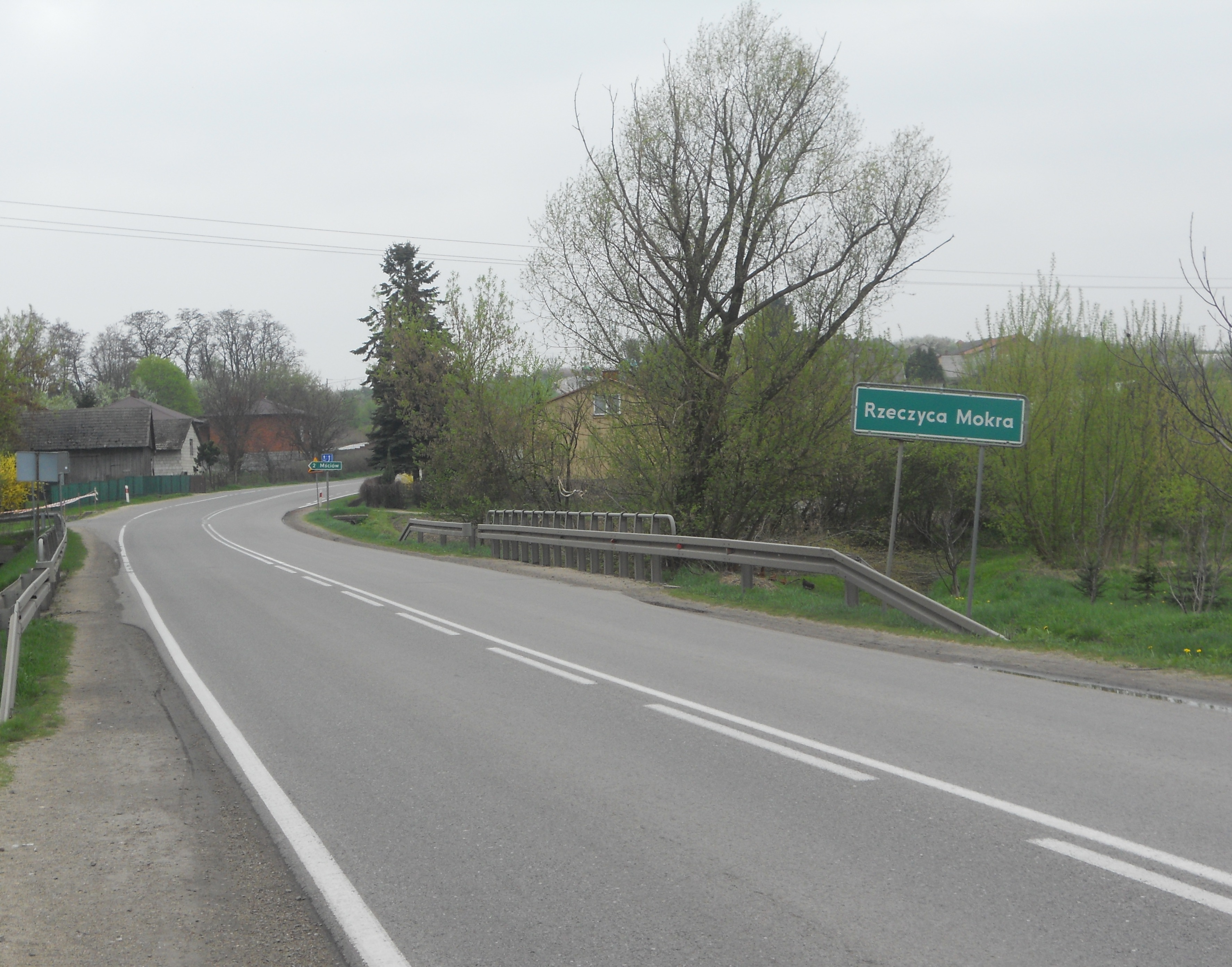

- Location within Poland
- Coordinates: 50°43′26″N 21°47′11″E
- Country: Poland
- Voivodeship: Świętokrzyskie
- County: Sandomierz
- Gmina: Dwikozy

Rzeczyca Mokra [ʐɛˈt͡ʂɨt͡sa ˈmɔkra] is a village in the administrative district of Gmina Dwikozy, within Sandomierz County, Świętokrzyskie Voivodeship, in south-central Poland. It lies approximately 1 km (1 mi) south of Dwikozy, 6 km (4 mi) north-east of Sandomierz, and 85 km (53 mi) east of the regional capital Kielce.
