= Nowy Kamień =

Nowy Kamień may refer to the following places in Poland:

- Nowy Kamień, Świętokrzyskie Voivodeship (south-central Poland)
- Nowy Kamień, Masovian Voivodeship (east-central Poland)
