= Mściów =

- Village
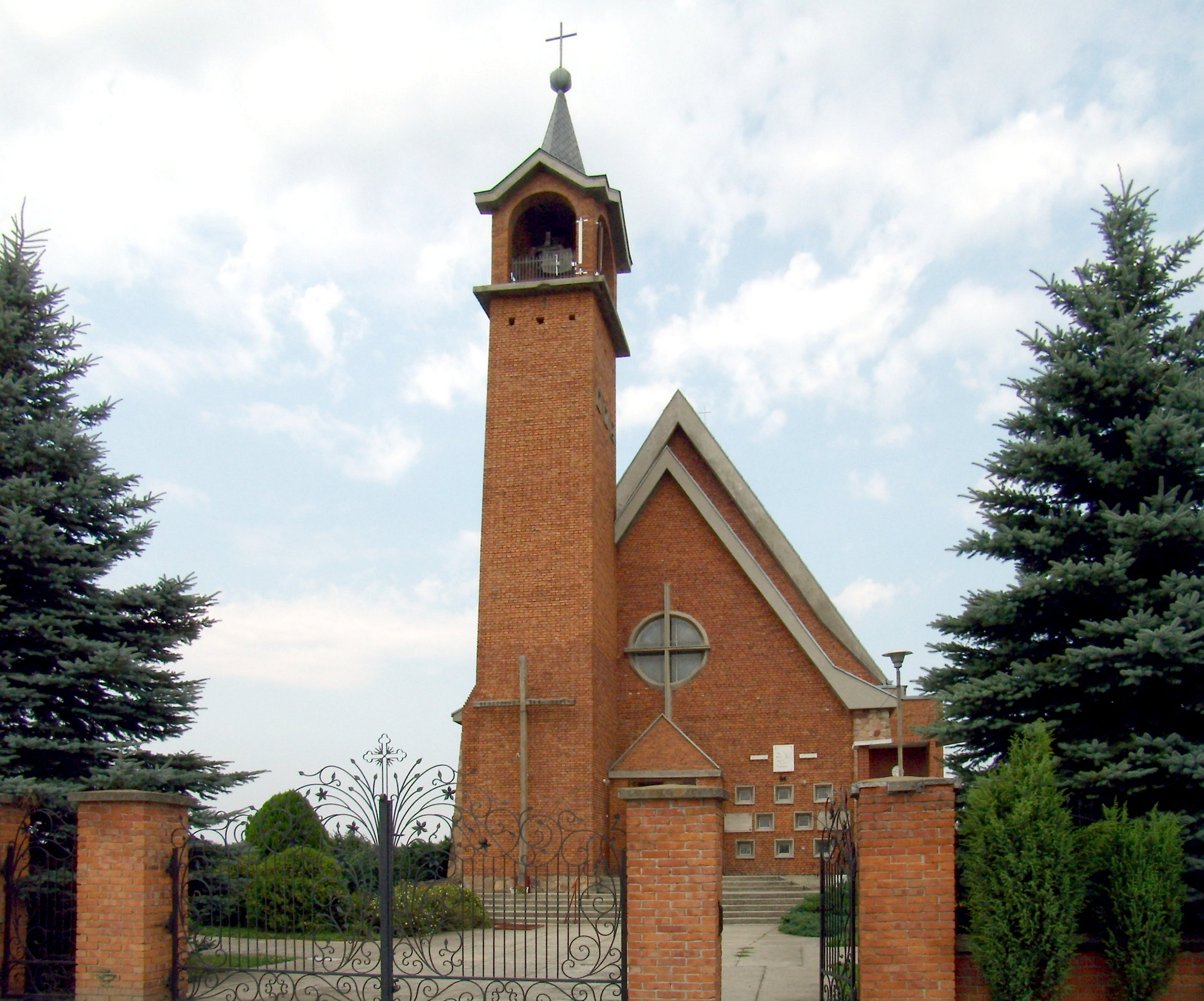
- Catholic church

- Location within Poland
- Coordinates: 50°42′41″N 21°48′24″E
- Country: Poland
- Voivodeship: Świętokrzyskie
- County: Sandomierz
- Gmina: Dwikozy
- Population: 920

Mściów [mɕt͡ɕuf] is a village in the administrative district of Gmina Dwikozy, within Sandomierz County, Świętokrzyskie Voivodeship, in south-central Poland. It lies approximately 3 km (2 mi) south-east of Dwikozy, 6 km (4 mi) north-east of Sandomierz, and 86 km (53 mi) east of the regional capital Kielce.
