= Rzeczyca Sucha =

- Village
- Location within Poland
- Coordinates: 50°42′48″N 21°45′30″E
- Country: Poland
- Voivodeship: Świętokrzyskie
- County: Sandomierz
- Gmina: Dwikozy

Rzeczyca Sucha [ʐɛˈt͡ʂɨt͡sa ˈsuxa] is a village in the administrative district of Gmina Dwikozy, within Sandomierz County, Świętokrzyskie Voivodeship, in south-central Poland. It lies approximately 3 km (2 mi) south-west of Dwikozy, 4 km (2 mi) north of Sandomierz, and 83 km (52 mi) east of the regional capital Kielce.
