= Open-air museum =

Museum that exhibits collections of buildings and artifacts out-of-doors

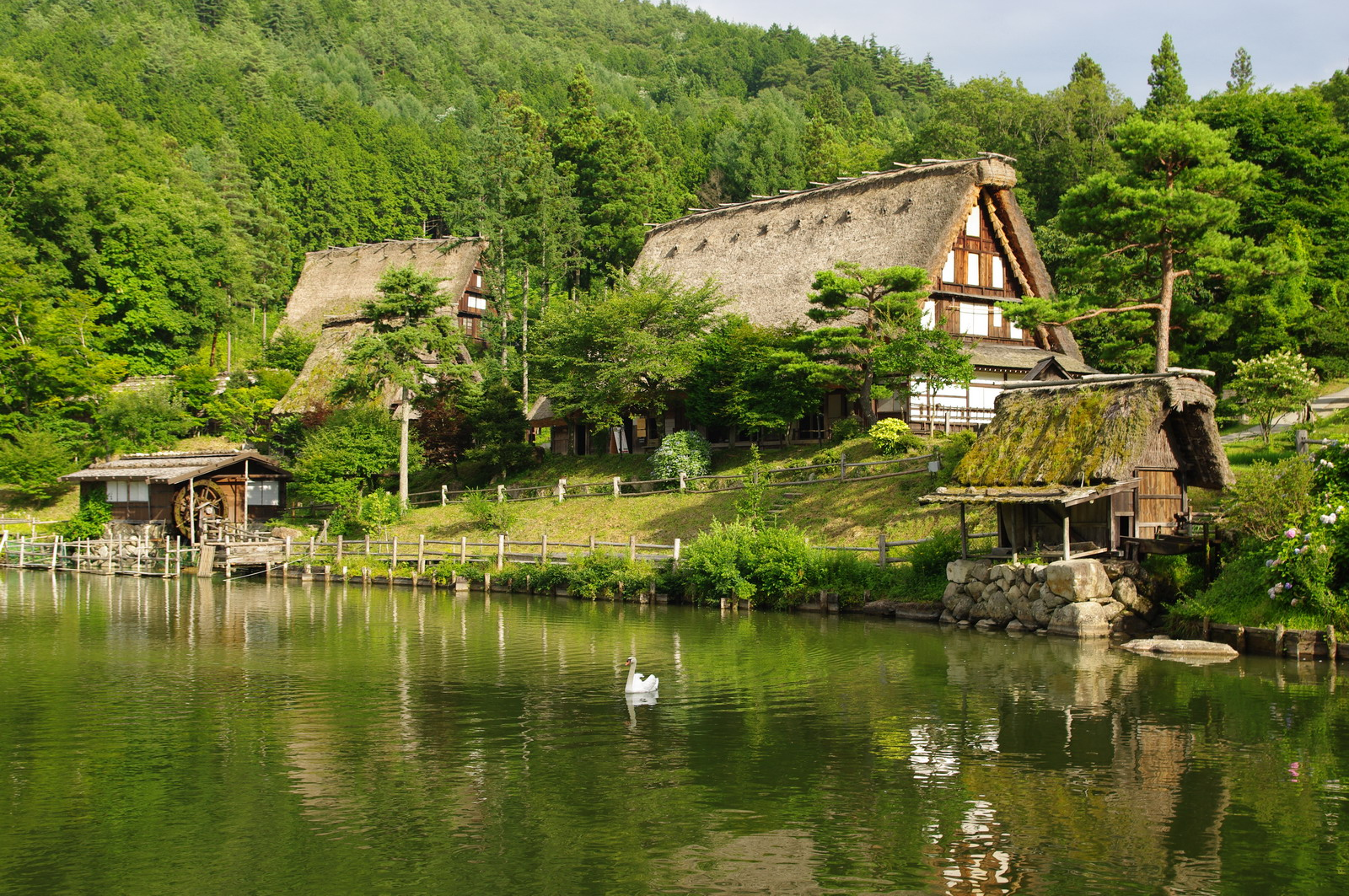
Hida Minzoku Mura Folk Village, Takayama, Gifu, Japan

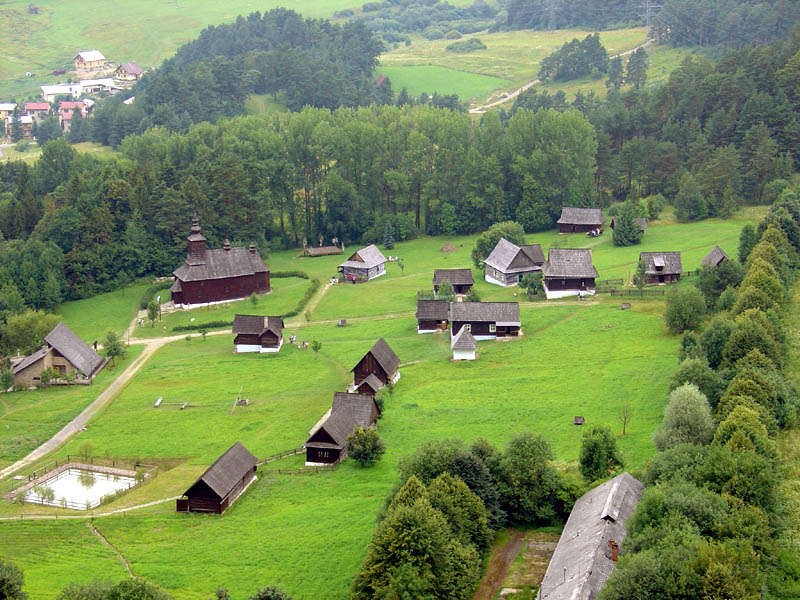
An aerial photograph of the open-air Ľubovňa Museum, located next to the Ľubovňa Castle.

An open-air museum is a museum that exhibits collections of buildings and artifacts outdoors. It is also frequently known as a museum of buildings or a folk museum.

== Definition ==
Open air is "the unconfined atmosphere ... outside buildings". In the loosest sense, an open-air museum is any institution that includes one or more buildings in its collections, including farm museums, historic house museums, and archaeological open-air museums. Mostly, "open-air museum" is applied to a museum that specializes in the collection and re-erection of multiple old buildings at large outdoor sites, usually in settings of recreated landscapes of the past, and often including living history. Such institutions may, therefore, be described as building museums. European open-air museums tended to be sited originally in regions where wooden architecture prevailed, as wooden structures may be translocated without substantial loss of authenticity.

Common to all open-air museums, including the earliest ones of the 19th century, is the teaching of the history of everyday living by people from all segments of society.

== Origins ==
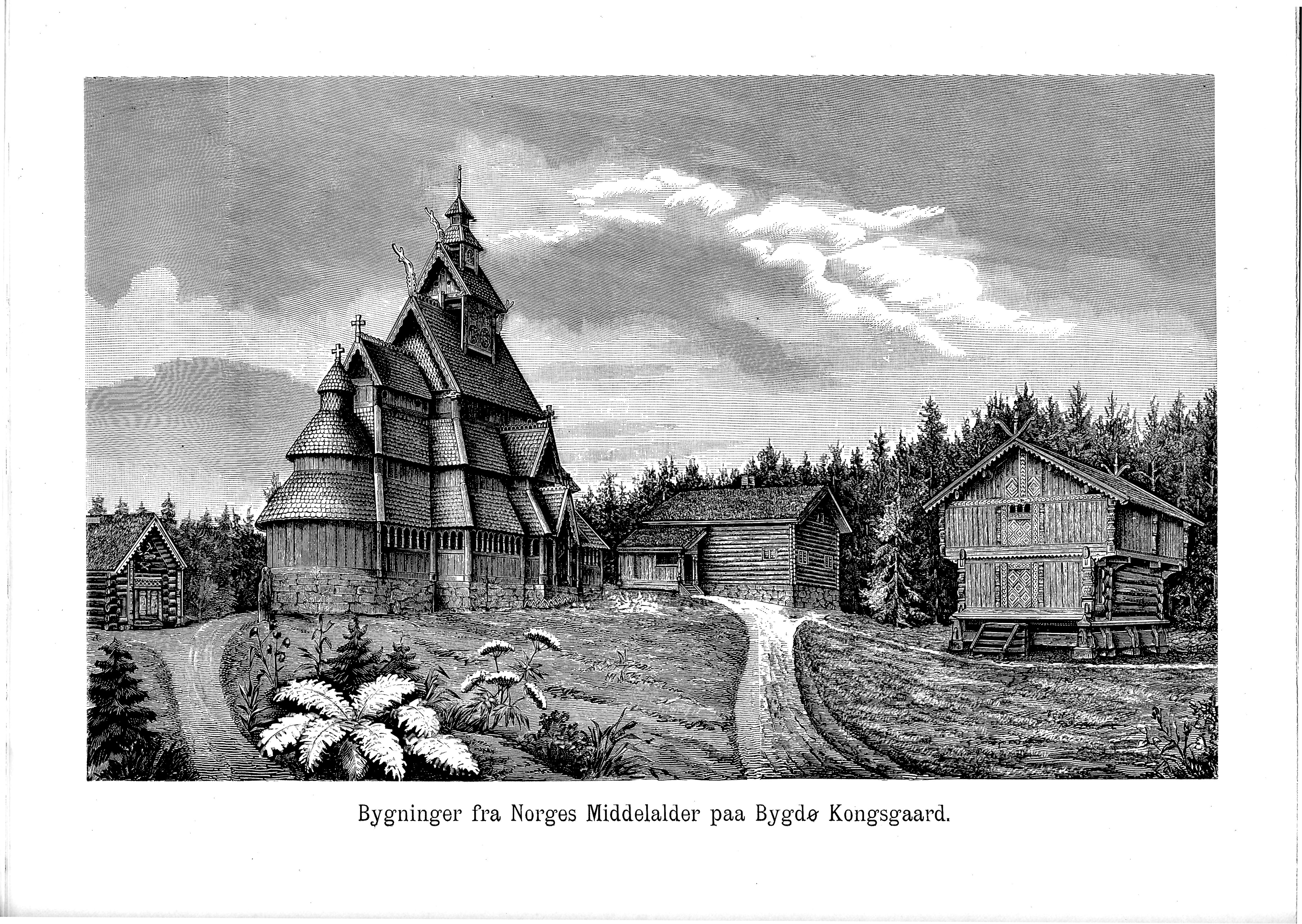
The World's first open-air museum, Swedish union King Oscar's Collection in Oslo. Wood engraving from the guide-book, 1888. Now part of Norsk Folkemuseum

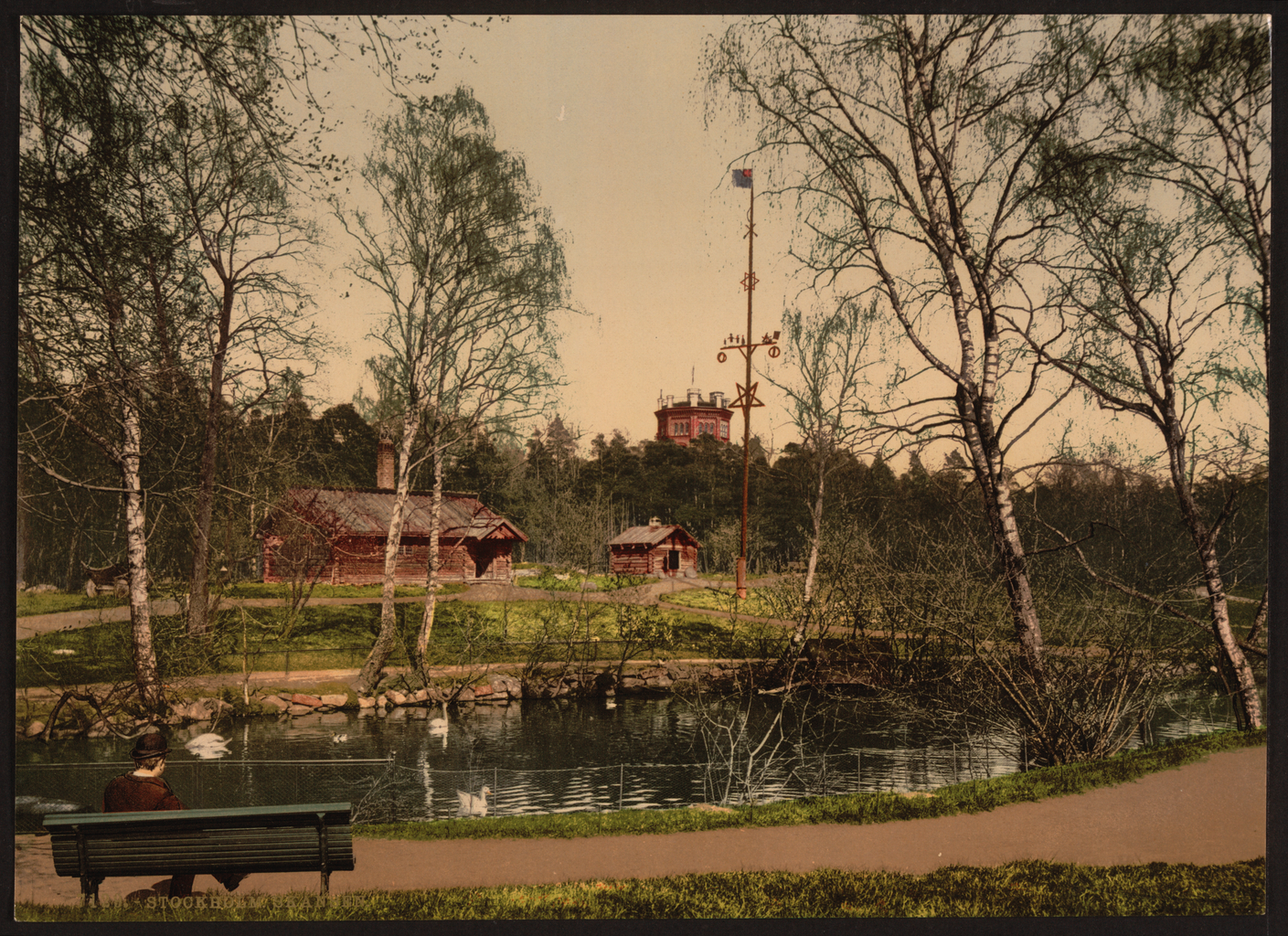
A view of Skansen, the worlds first major open-air museum, around 1900

The idea of the open-air museum dates to the 1790s. The first proponent of the idea was the Swiss thinker Charles de Bonstetten, and was based on a visit to an exhibit of sculptures of Norwegian peasants in folk costumes in the park of Fredensborg Palace in Denmark, "Valley of the Norsemen". He believed that traditional peasant houses should be preserved against modernity, but failed to attract support for the idea.

The first major steps towards the creation of open-air museums were taken in Sweden–Norway in 1881, when the monarch Oscar II transferred four historic farm buildings and the stave church from Gol to the royal manor at Bygdøy near Oslo (Christiania) for public viewing. This, in turn, in 1884 and 1885 inspired Artur Hazelius, founder of the Nordic Museum in Stockholm, to establish his own open-air museum known as Skansen adjacent to the Nordic Museum. Skansen, opened to the public in 1891, was a more ambitious undertaking, including farm buildings from across Sweden, folk costumes, live animals, folk music, and demonstrations of folk crafts. The second open-air museum in the world to open its doors was also in Sweden: Kulturen in Lund in 1892. In 1894 the Norwegian Museum of Cultural History (Norsk Folkemuseum) was founded in Oslo by Hans Aall, inspired by Skansen. Aall bought a large tract of land adjacent to King Oscar's royal collections, probably with a merger between them in mind. The open-air Norsk Folkemuseum was opened at Bygdøy in 1902. In 1907 the royal collections were incorporated after the death of King Oscar and the dissolution of the union between Sweden–Norway.

Most open-air museums concentrate on rural culture. However, since the opening of the first town museum (The Old Town in Aarhus, Denmark) in 1914, town culture has also become a scope of open-air museums. In many cases, new town quarters are being constructed in existing rural culture museums.

== Living-history museums ==
Living-history museums, including living-farm museums and living museums, are open-air museums where costumed interpreters portray period life in an earlier era. The interpreters act as if they are living in a different time and place and perform everyday household tasks, crafts, and occupations. The goal is to demonstrate older lifestyles and pursuits to modern audiences. Household tasks might include cooking on an open hearth, churning butter, spinning wool and weaving, and farming without modern equipment. Many living museums feature traditional craftsmen at work, such as a blacksmith, pewtersmith, silversmith, weaver, tanner, armorer, cooper, potter, miller, sawyer, cabinet-maker, woodcarver, printer, doctor, and general storekeeper.

== North American innovations ==
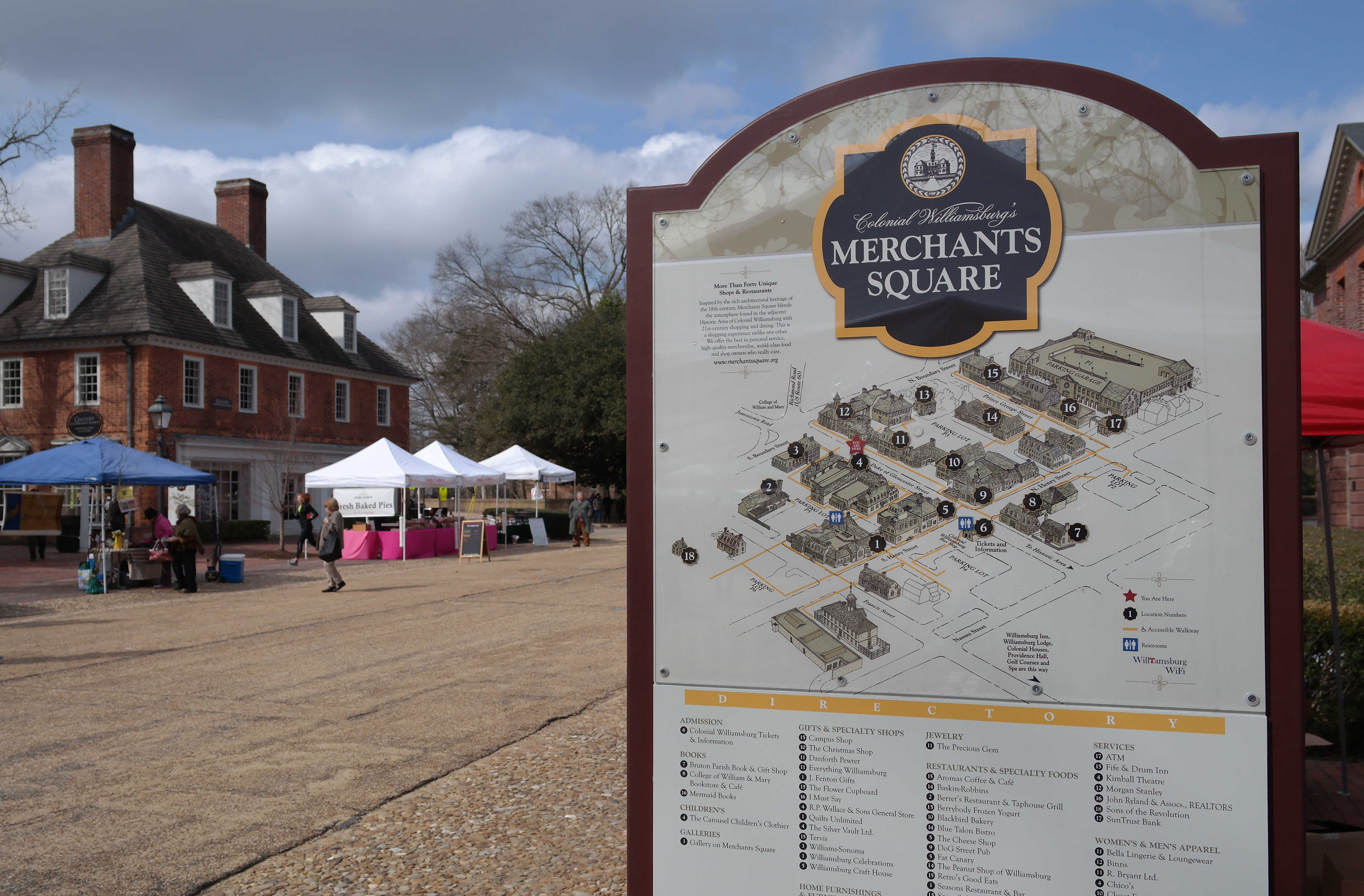
A view of the Farmers' Market in Merchant's Square in Colonial Williamsburg with map in foreground

The North American open-air museum, more commonly called a living-history museum, had a different, slightly later origin than the European, and the visitor experience is different. The first was Henry Ford's Greenfield Village in Dearborn, Michigan (1928), where Ford intended his collection to be "a pocket edition of America". Colonial Williamsburg (opened in 1934), though, had a greater influence on museum development in North America. It influenced such projects throughout the continent as Mystic Seaport, Plimoth Patuxet (formerly Plimoth Plantation), and Fortress Louisbourg. The approach to interpretation tends to differentiate the North American from the European model. In Europe, the tendency is to usually focus on the buildings.

In North America, many open-air museums include interpreters who dress in period costume and conduct period crafts and everyday work. The living museum is, therefore, viewed as an attempt to recreate to the fullest extent conditions of a culture, natural environment, or historical period. The objective is immersion, using exhibits so that visitors can experience the specific culture, environment or historical period using their physical senses.

Performance and historiographic practices at American living museums have been critiqued in the past several years by scholars in anthropology and theater for creating false senses of authenticity and accuracy, and for neglecting to bear witness to some of the darker aspects of the American past (e.g., slavery and other forms of injustice). Even before such critiques were published, sites such as Williamsburg and others had begun to add more interpretation of difficult history.

== See also ==
- List of open-air museums
- Sculpture garden
- Historical reenactment
- Human zoo
- List of Renaissance fairs
- List of tourist attractions providing reenactment
