= Słupcza =

- Village
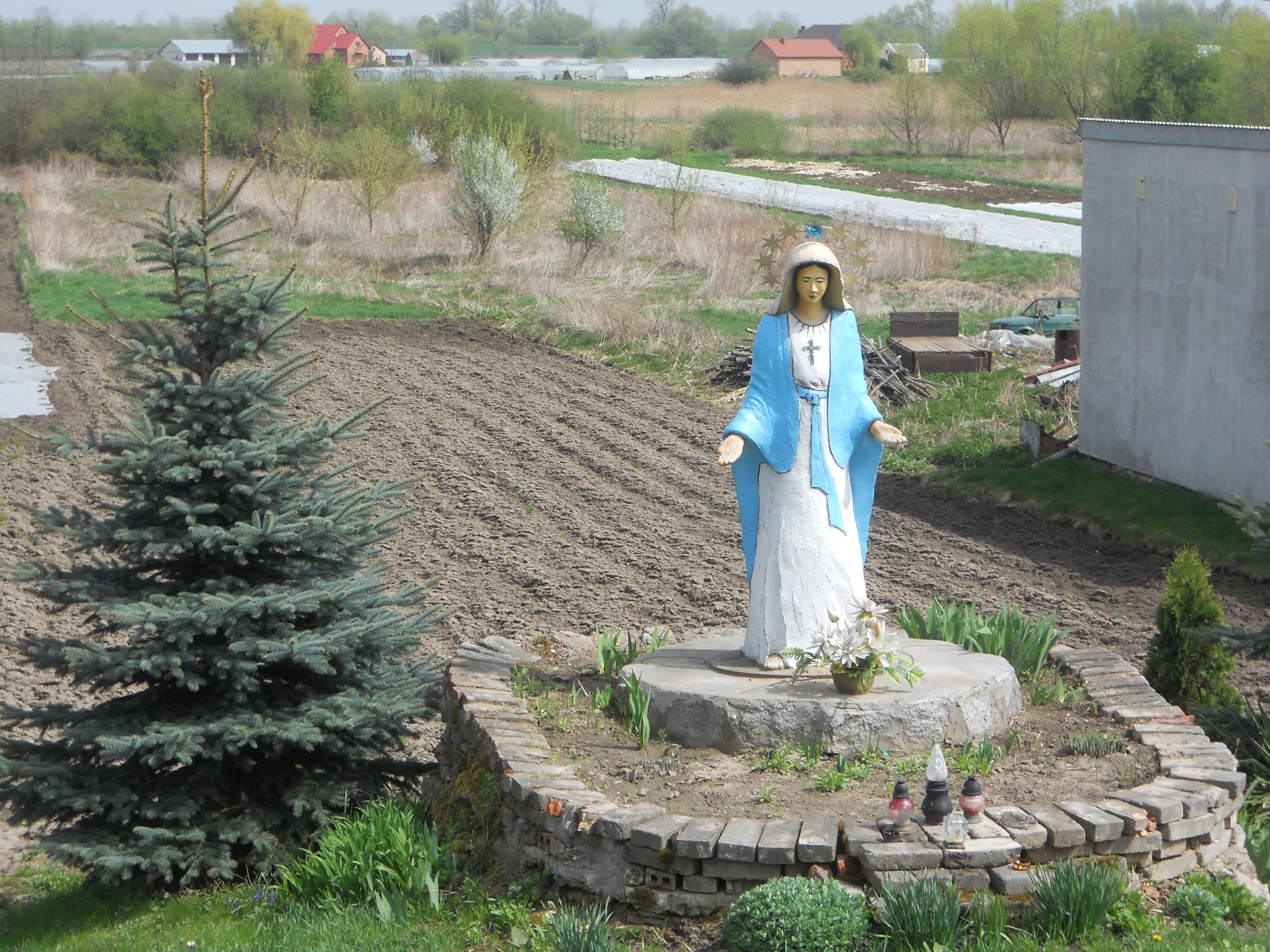
- Wayside shrine in Słupcza

- Location within Poland
- Coordinates: 50°45′19″N 21°48′39″E
- Country: Poland
- Voivodeship: Świętokrzyskie
- County: Sandomierz
- Gmina: Dwikozy
- Time zone: UTC+1 (CET)
  - Summer (DST): UTC+2 (CEST)
- Vehicle registration: TSA

Słupcza [ˈswupt͡ʂa] is a village in the administrative district of Gmina Dwikozy, within Sandomierz County, Świętokrzyskie Voivodeship, in south-central Poland. It lies approximately 4 km (2 mi) north-east of Dwikozy, 10 km (6 mi) north-east of Sandomierz, and 86 km (53 mi) east of the regional capital Kielce.

During the January Uprising, on 8 February 1863, the Battle of Słupcza was fought nearby between Polish insurgents and Russian troops.
