= Stará Ľubovňa =

City in Slovakia

- Municipality
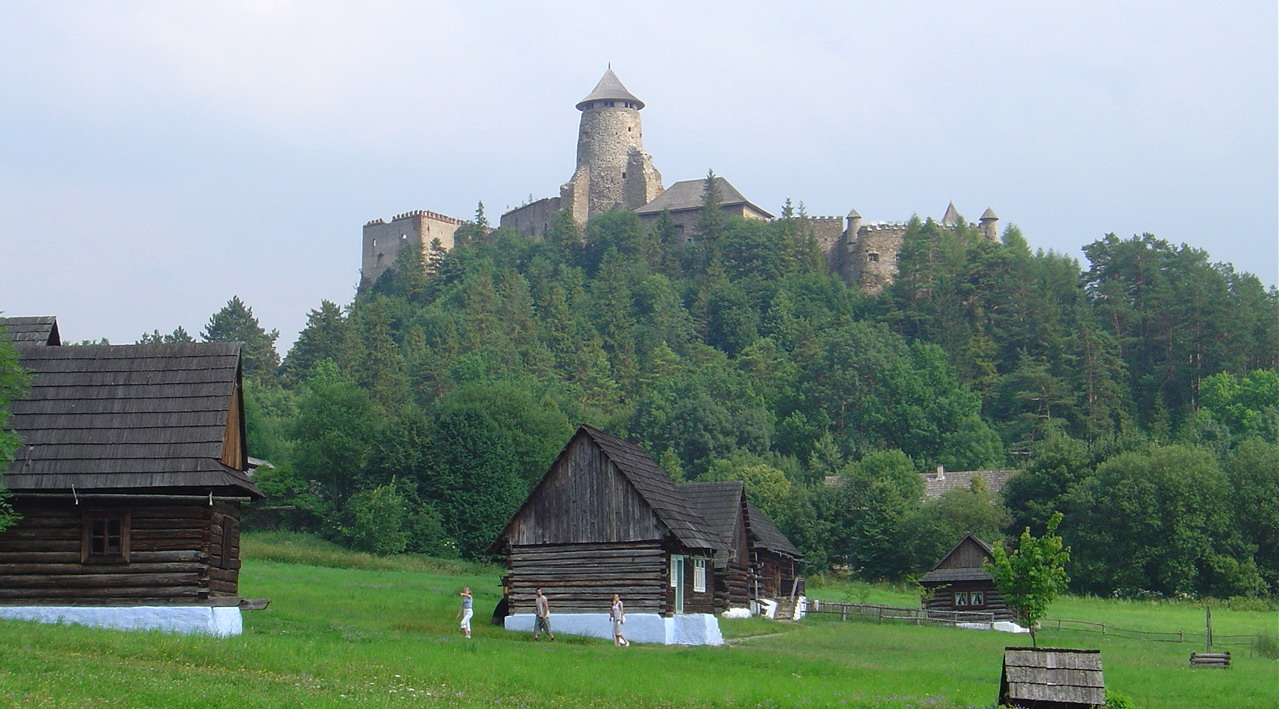
- Ľubovňa Castle and an open-air folk museum

- Flag Coat of arms

- Location of Stará Ľubovňa in the Prešov Region Location of Stará Ľubovňa in Slovakia
- Coordinates: 49.31°N 20.68°E
- Country: Slovakia
- Region: Prešov Region
- District: Stará Ľubovňa District
- First mentioned: 1292

Government
  - Mayor: Ľuboš Tomko

Area
  - Total: 30.78 km^{2} (11.88 sq mi)
- Elevation: 532 m (1,745 ft)

Population (2025)
  - Total: 15,534
- Time zone: UTC+1 (CET)
  - Summer (DST): UTC+2 (CEST)
- Postal code: 640 1
- Area code: +421 52
- Vehicle registration plate (until 2022): SL
- Website: www.staralubovna.sk

Stará Ľubovňa (German: Altlublau, Hungarian: Ólubló, Rusyn: Стара Любовня, Latin: Lublovia, Polish: Lubowla, Ukrainian: Стара Любовня) is a town with approximately 16,000 inhabitants in northeastern Slovakia. The town consists of the districts Podsadek and Stará Ľubovňa.

== Names ==
The name is of Slovak or Slavic origin and is potentially derived from a personal name. It comes from a root ľub- meaning lovely, nicely. The same root is present in Czech Libeň, Polish Lublin, Slovenian Ljubljana and similar Slavic geographic names. The German name Altlublau and the Hungarian Ólubló were derived from the Slovak version.

== Geography ==
The municipality lies at an altitude of 532 metres (1,745 ft) and covers an area of 30.78 km^{2} (11.88 sq mi) (2025).

Stará Ľubovňa is situated on the Poprad River 15 kilometres (9 miles) south of the Polish border and 30 kilometres (19 miles) east of the High Tatras. It is one of the oldest towns in the Spiš, an historic administrative county (comitatus) of the Kingdom of Hungary, and is today the administrative capital of the district of Stará Ľubovňa in the Prešov Region.

== History ==
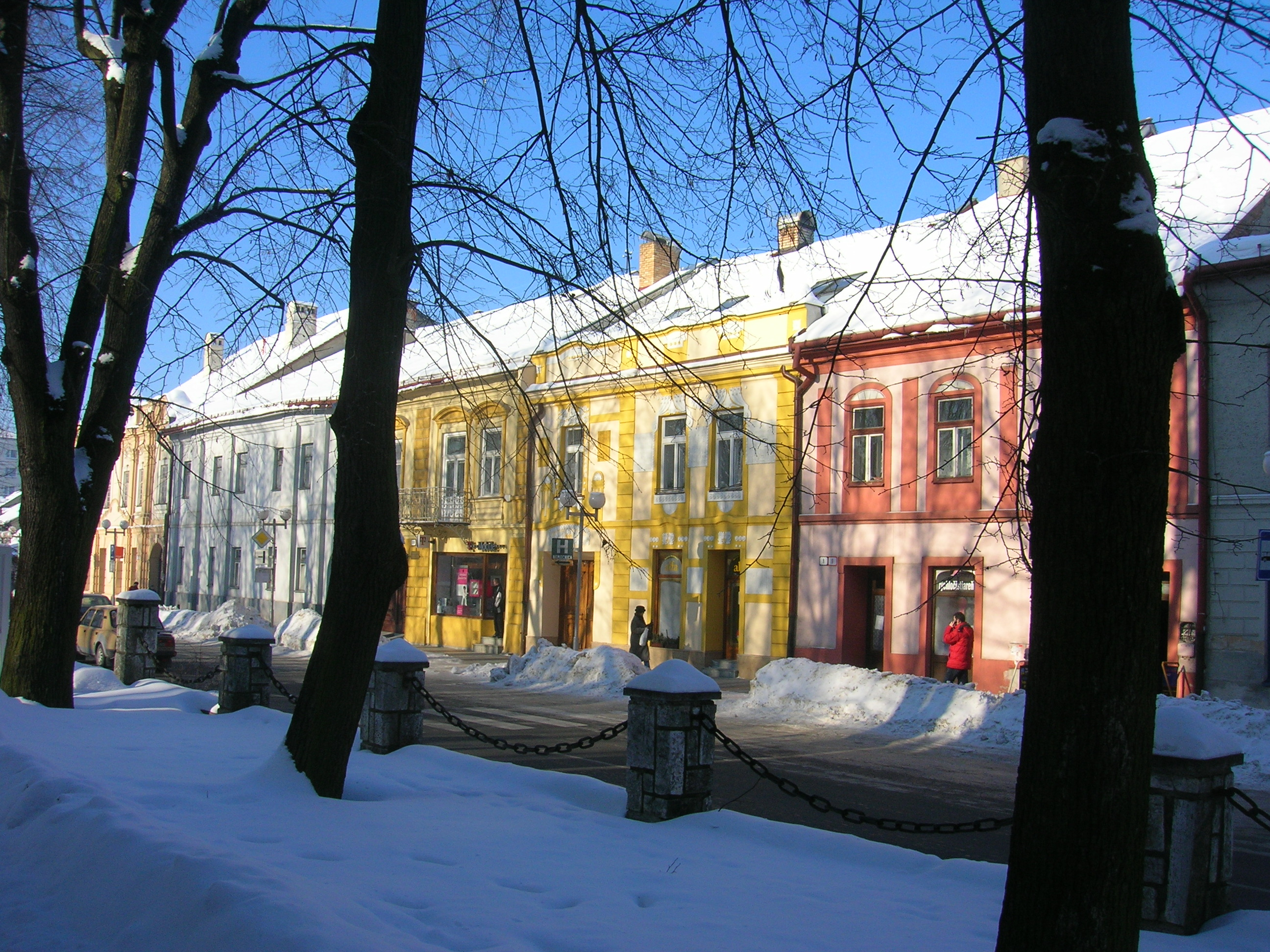
The main square

Castle from the grounds

In 1292 Stará Ľubovňa is first mentioned as Libenow. In 1311, the Ľubovňa Castle was mentioned. In 1323, King Charles I granted the castles of Ľubovňa and Plaveč to Palatine Philip Drugeth. At that time, Lubowla was held by Count Nicholas. In 1342, Louis the Great granted the settlement town privileges. In 1384, a meeting took place in Lubowla between Sigismund of Luxembourg, Margrave of Brandenburg, and the Polish nobles, to discuss the conditions for the Hungarian princess Jadwiga's arrival in Poland to assume the throne after her father.

Sigismund, already King of Hungary by then, held another meeting here in 1412 with Władysław Jagiełło, King of Poland. At this meeting Ľubovňa was among 16 Spiš towns given by the Sigismund of Luxemburg as a deposit to King Władysław II of Poland. The pledge was part of the Treaty of Lubowla and was thought to be only for a short time, but it finally lasted for 360 years.

Ľubovňa became the seat of a separate starostwo of Spiš. The first starosta was Paweł Gładysz, who spoke Hungarian; he was succeeded by the famous knight Zawisza the Black. In 1587, during Archduke Maximilian of Austria’s bid for the Polish crown, his supporters seized the castle; however, after Maximilian’s defeat at Byczyna, it returned to Polish hands. During the Swedish Deluge, the Crown Treasury was brought to the castle from Kraków.

Only in the course of the first Partition of Poland in 1772 during the reign of Maria Theresa of Austria the territory came back to the Kingdom of Hungary. The pledge was actually an advantage for the towns concerned because they did not have to submit themselves to the comitatus or nobility and had a neutral position in turmoils between Poland and Hungary.

Before the establishment of independent Czechoslovakia in 1918, Stará Ľubovňa was part of Szepes County within the Kingdom of Hungary. From 1939 to 1945, it was part of the Slovak Republic owned by a branch of the Polish Zamoyski Counts family.. On 24 January 1945, the Red Army dislodged the Wehrmacht from Stará Ľubovňa and it was once again part of Czechoslovakia.

== Sights ==
From a hill over the city the castle of Ľubovňa dominates the city. The castle is open to the public and houses a museum about its history. From its already reconstructed tower there are good views over the surroundings. Next to the castle there is an open-air museum, Ľubovniansky skanzen, with many houses and other buildings showing the folk architecture of the region. The most interesting exhibit is the wooden Greek-Catholic church from Matysová, built in 1833.

The old town consists mainly of the rectangular St. Nicolas Square which is surrounded by burgher's houses of the 17th century. In the centre there is the gothic Roman Catholic Church of St. Nicolas built in 1280.

Another building of interest is the new Greek-Catholic church of the Mother of Eternal Help in the south of the city. It was consecrated by Pope John Paul II on 22 April 1990 and is constructed in the shape of a royal crown.

== Population ==
Historical population
Year	Pop.	±%
1970	4,406	—
1980	8,866	+101.2%
1991	13,995	+57.9%
2001	16,227	+15.9%
2011	16,341	+0.7%
2021	15,938	−2.5%
Source: Censuses

Population statistic (10 years)
Year	1995	2005	2015	2025
Count	15,640	16,363	16,347	15,534
Difference		+4.62%	−0.09%	−4.97%

Population statistic
Year	2024	2025
Count	15,599	15,534
Difference		−0.41%

It has a population of 15,534 people (31 December 2025).

=== Ethnicity ===
Census 2021 (1+ %)
Ethnicity	Number	Fraction
Slovak	13,790	86.52%
Not found out	1672	10.49%
Rusyn	1355	8.5%
Romani	1093	6.85%
Total	15,938	

In year 2021 was 15,938 people by ethnicity 13,790 as Slovak, 1672 as Not found out, 1355 as Rusyn, 1093 as Romani, 95 as Czech, 85 as Ukrainian, 62 as Polish, 54 as Other, 33 as German, 24 as Hungarian, 18 as Russian, 7 as Moravian, 5 as Irish, 5 as English, 4 as Romanian, 3 as Vietnamese, 3 as Serbian, 3 as Croatian, 2 as Jewish, 2 as Chinese, 2 as Italian, 1 as Austrian and 1 as Albanian.

Note on population: The difference values of population numbers in the table "Population statistic" and in the sections "Ethnicity" & "Religion" is caused by the use of various statistical methods.

=== Religion ===
Census 2021 (1+ %)
Religion	Number	Fraction
Roman Catholic Church	8818	55.33%
Greek Catholic Church	3529	22.14%
Not found out	1737	10.9%
None	1416	8.88%
Eastern Orthodox Church	176	1.1%
Total	15,938	

In year 2021 was 15,938 people by religion 8818 from Roman Catholic Church, 3529 from Greek Catholic Church, 1737 from Not found out, 1416 from None, 176 from Eastern Orthodox Church, 71 from Evangelical Church, 42 from Ad hoc movements, 36 from Other and not ascertained christian church, 25 from Other, 16 from Jehovah's Witnesses, 16 from United Methodist Church, 13 from Calvinist Church, 11 from Christian Congregations in Slovakia, 9 from Buddhism, 7 from Paganism and natural spirituality, 5 from Old Catholic Church, 4 from Islam, 2 from Seventh-day Adventist Church, 1 from Jewish community, 1 from Hinduism, 1 from Czechoslovak Hussite Church, 1 from Baptists Church and 1 from Apostolic Church.

== Famous residents ==
- Ján Melkovič, actor
- Ján Kubašek, priest and signatory of the Pittsburgh Agreement
- Marián Hossa, professional ice hockey right winger
- Marcin Oracewicz
- Zita Pleštinská, politician and Member of the European Parliament

== Twin towns — sister cities ==
Stará Ľubovňa is twinned with:

- Aleșd, Romania
- Bački Petrovac, Serbia
- Balchik, Bulgaria
- Biograd na Moru, Croatia
- North Augusta, United States
- Nowy Sącz, Poland
- Połaniec, Poland
- Svaliava, Ukraine
- Vsetín, Czech Republic

== Gallery ==
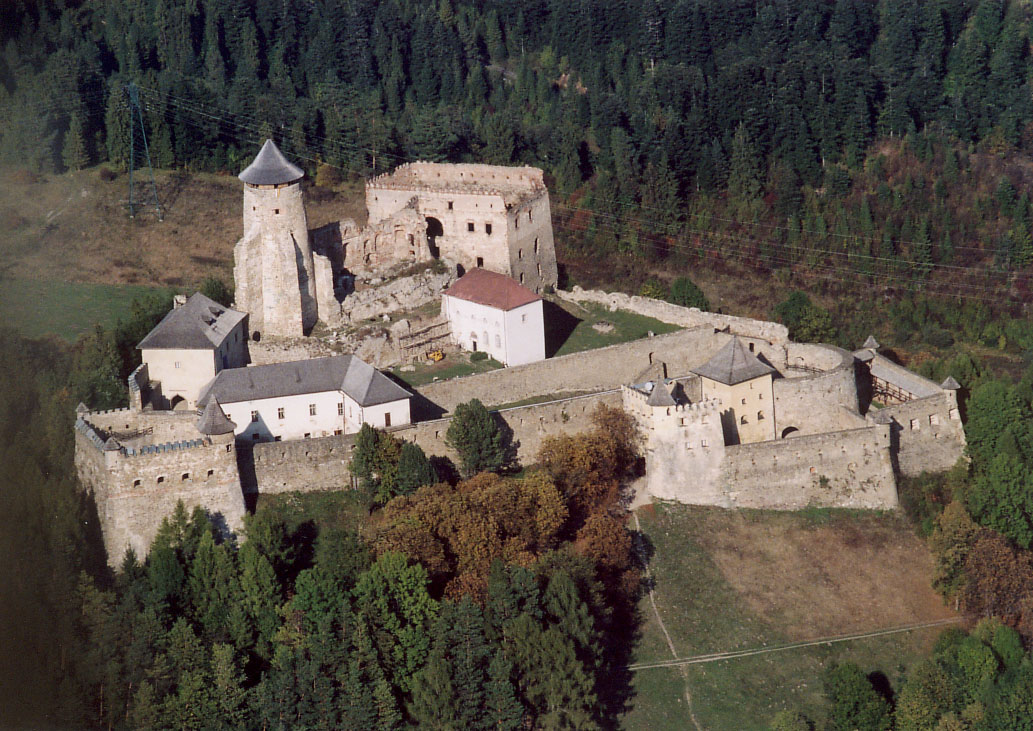
Castle from above
