= Kolonia Gałkowice =

- Village
- Location within Poland
- Coordinates: 50°44′50″N 21°43′18″E
- Country: Poland
- Voivodeship: Świętokrzyskie
- County: Sandomierz
- Gmina: Dwikozy

Kolonia Gałkowice [kɔˈlɔɲa ɡau̯kɔˈvit͡sɛ] is a village in the administrative district of Gmina Dwikozy, within Sandomierz County, Świętokrzyskie Voivodeship, in south-central Poland. It lies approximately 6 km (4 mi) west of Dwikozy, 8 km (5 mi) north of Sandomierz, and 79 km (49 mi) east of the regional capital Kielce.
