= Czermin, Świętokrzyskie Voivodeship =

Czermin
- Village
- Location within Poland
- Coordinates: 50°46′5″N 21°47′15″E
- Country: Poland
- Voivodeship: Świętokrzyskie
- County: Sandomierz
- Gmina: Dwikozy

Czermin [ˈt͡ʂɛrmin] is a village in the administrative district of Gmina Dwikozy, within Sandomierz County, Świętokrzyskie Voivodeship, in south-central Poland. It lies approximately 4 km (2 mi) north of Dwikozy, 10 km (6 mi) north of Sandomierz, and 84 km (52 mi) east of the regional capital Kielce.
