= Gmina Dwikozy =

Gmina Dwikozy Dwikozy Commune
- Gmina
- Flag Coat of arms

- Location within Poland
- Coordinates (Dwikozy): 50°43′56″N 21°47′11″E
- Country: Poland
- Voivodeship: Świętokrzyskie
- County: Sandomierz
- Seat: Dwikozy

Area
  - Total: 84.79 km^{2} (32.74 sq mi)

Population (2013)
  - Total: 8,974
  - Density: 105.8/km^{2} (274.1/sq mi)

Gmina Dwikozy is a rural gmina (administrative district) in Sandomierz County, Świętokrzyskie Voivodeship, in south-central Poland. Its seat is the village of Dwikozy, which lies approximately 7 kilometres (4 mi) north-east of Sandomierz and 84 km (52 mi) east of the regional capital Kielce.

The gmina covers an area of 84.79 square kilometres (32.7 sq mi), and as of 2006 its total population is 9,087 (8,974 in 2013).

== Villages ==
Gmina Dwikozy contains the villages and settlements of Bożydar, Buczek, Czermin, Dwikozy, Gałkowice, Gierlachów, Góry Wysokie, Kamień Łukawski, Kępa Chwałowska, Kolonia Gałkowice, Mściów, Nowe Kichary, Nowy Garbów, Nowy Kamień, Romanówka, Rzeczyca Mokra, Rzeczyca Sucha, Słupcza, Stare Kichary, Stary Garbów, Szczytniki, Winiarki and Winiary.

== Neighbouring gminas ==
Gmina Dwikozy is bordered by the town of Sandomierz and by the gminas of Gorzyce, Obrazów, Ożarów, Radomyśl nad Sanem, Wilczyce and Zawichost.
