= Treaty of Lubowla =

1412 treaty between Poland and Hungary

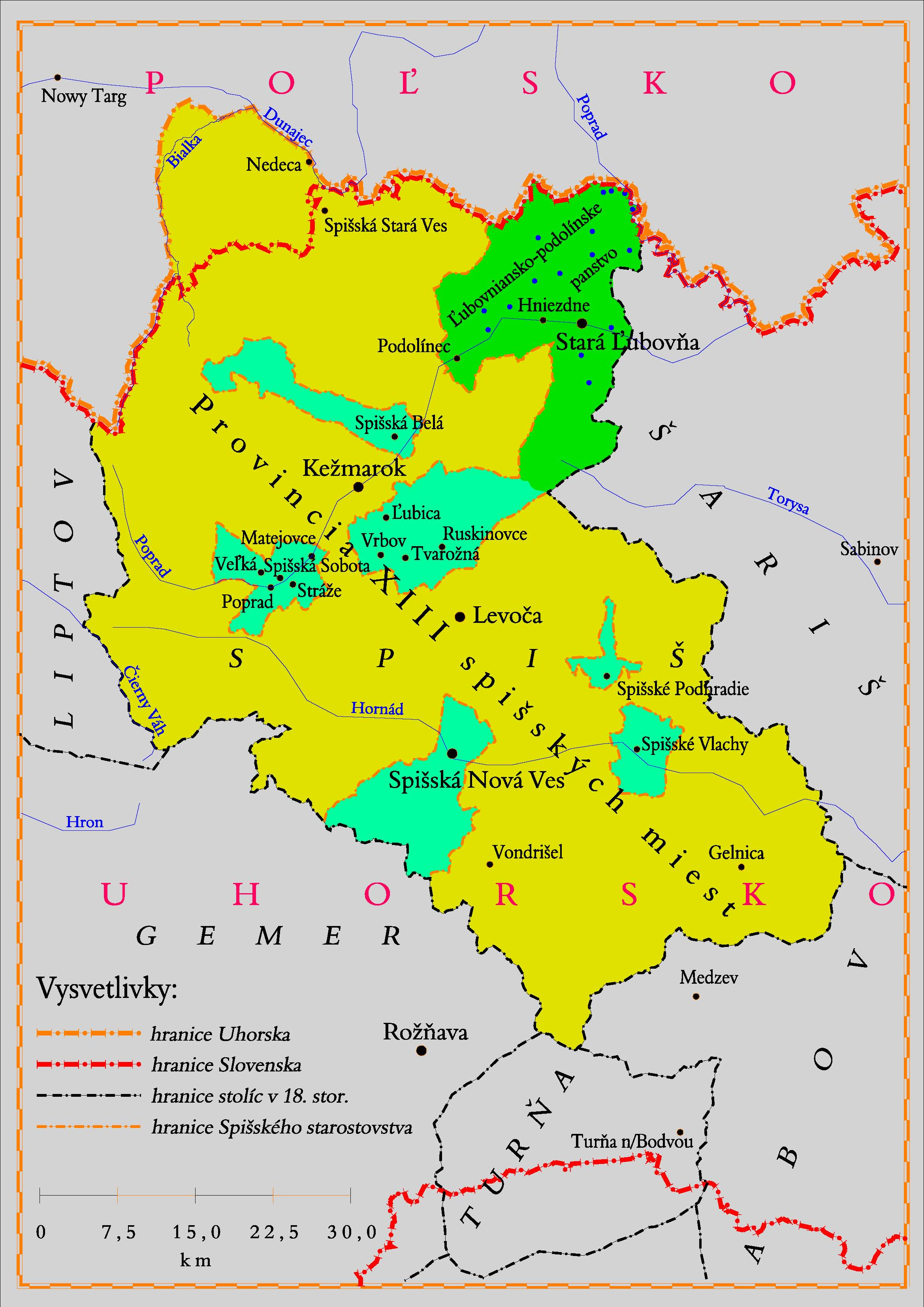
- The Spiš (Spisz) region. Light blue and green areas show the pawned territories, red line shows current borders, yellow former border between then Hungary and Poland and the black borders between counties
- Signed: March 15, 1412
- Location: Lubowla (now Stará Ľubovňa, Slovakia)
- Parties: Kingdom of Poland Kingdom of Hungary

Treaty of Lubowla of 1412 was a treaty between Władysław II, King of Poland, and Sigismund of Luxemburg, King of Hungary. Negotiations took place in the town of Lublo (today Stará Ľubovňa, Slovakia) and a treaty confirmed later that year in Buda.

== Treaty ==
The treaty was negotiated by Stibor of Stiboricz and Zawisza Czarny, two of the most famous Polish knights of the late Middle Ages. The Hungarian state was experiencing large financial problems due to constant wars with the Ottoman Empire, as well as pressure from the Habsburg family. The provisions of the treaty included confirmation of the First Peace of Thorn between Poland and the Teutonic Knights. At the same time, Hungary offered secretly to support the Polish rights to the province of Pomerelia, lost to the Teutonic Order. Finally, in exchange for a loan of sixty times the amount of 37,000 Prague groschen, that is approximately seven tonnes of pure silver, the Hungarian crown pawned 16 rich salt-producing towns in the area of Spisz (Szepes), as well as a right to incorporate them into Poland until the debt is repaid.

After the meeting in Stará Ľubovňa, the Polish delegation with King Władysław Jagiełło proceeded to Košice, where they were met by the Hungarian king. Then they proceeded to Tokaj, Debrecen, and finally to the tomb of Saint Ladislaus in Nagyvárad. From there they proceeded to Buda, where the treaty was officially signed in presence of King Tvrtko II of Bosnia, fourteen dukes and princes, three archbishops, eleven bishops and ambassadors of seventeen states, including the Tartar Horde and the Ottoman Empire, as well as roughly 40,000 nobles and knights. To commemorate the event, a tournament was organized, in which both Polish and Hungarian knights took part. Among them were Zawisza Czarny, his brother Firlej, Scibor Jedrzny of Ostoja, Dobko of Oleśnica and Powała of Taczew.

== Aftermath ==
The treaty was never broken yet the debt was not repaid and the area of Spisz remained a part of Poland until the Partitions of Poland in late 18th century, when in 1769, during the Bar Confederation, the Austrian forces of Joseph II, Holy Roman Emperor took control of the towns acting under the pretext of securing the region from war. It never returned to Poland; instead, Polish weakness encouraged the Habsburg monarchy to take part in the First Partition of Poland.

== See also ==
- List of treaties
