= Nowy Kamień, Świętokrzyskie Voivodeship =

Nowy Kamień
- Village
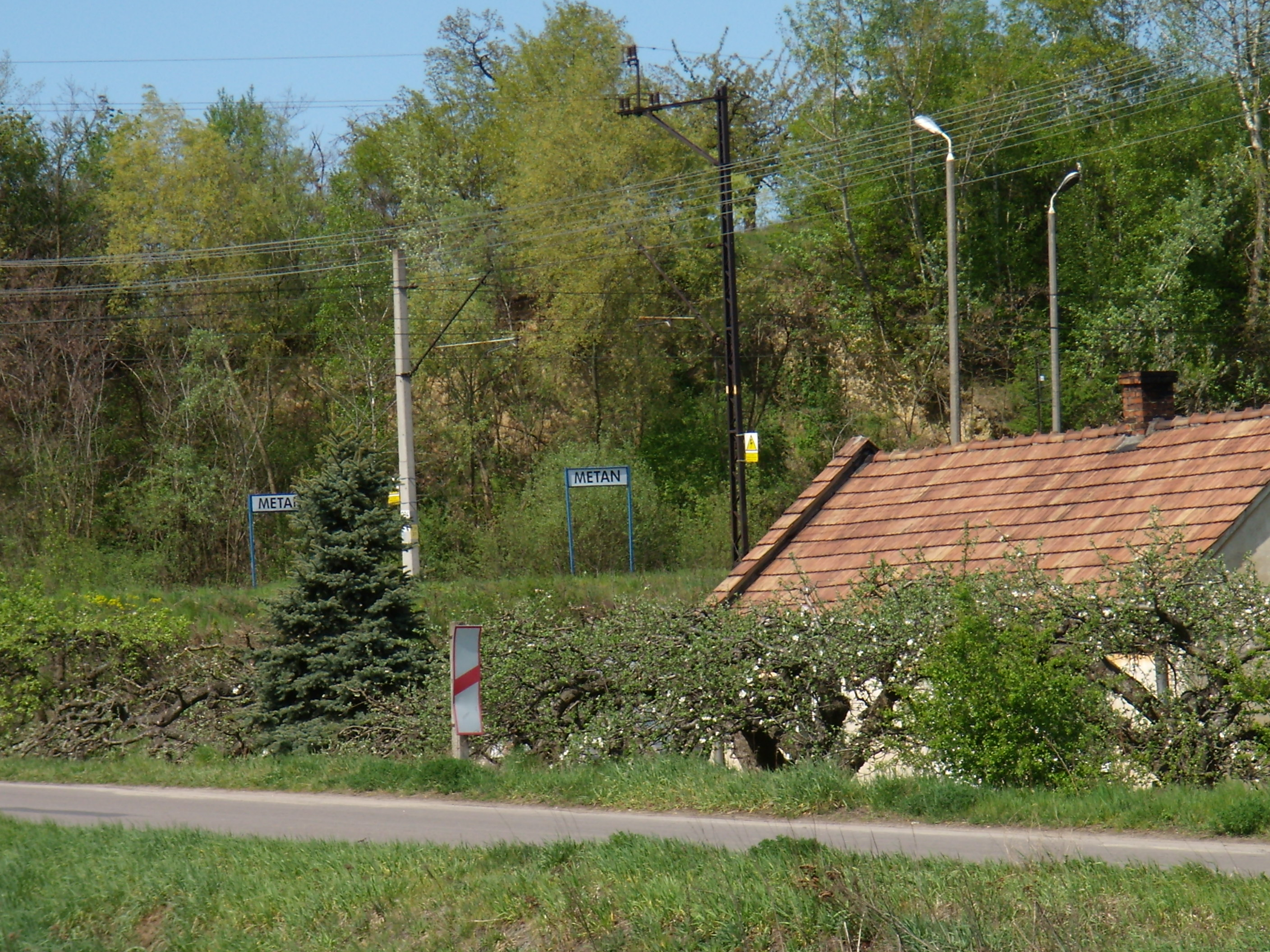
- Railway stop

- Location within Poland
- Coordinates: 50°41′51″N 21°48′13″E
- Country: Poland
- Voivodeship: Świętokrzyskie
- County: Sandomierz
- Gmina: Dwikozy
- Population: 530

Nowy Kamień (Polish pronunciation: [ˈnɔvɨ ˈkamjɛj̃]) is a village in the administrative district of Gmina Dwikozy, within Sandomierz County, Świętokrzyskie Voivodeship, in south-central Poland. It lies approximately 16 km (10 mi) north of Sokołów Małopolski, 36 km (22 mi) south of Stalowa Wola, and 36 km (22 mi) south of the regional capital Rzeszów.
