= Ľubovňa Castle =

Historic site in Slovakia

Coordinates: 49°18′54.79″N 20°41′57.88″E

- Ľubovniansky hrad
- Spiš, Stará Ľubovňa, Slovakia
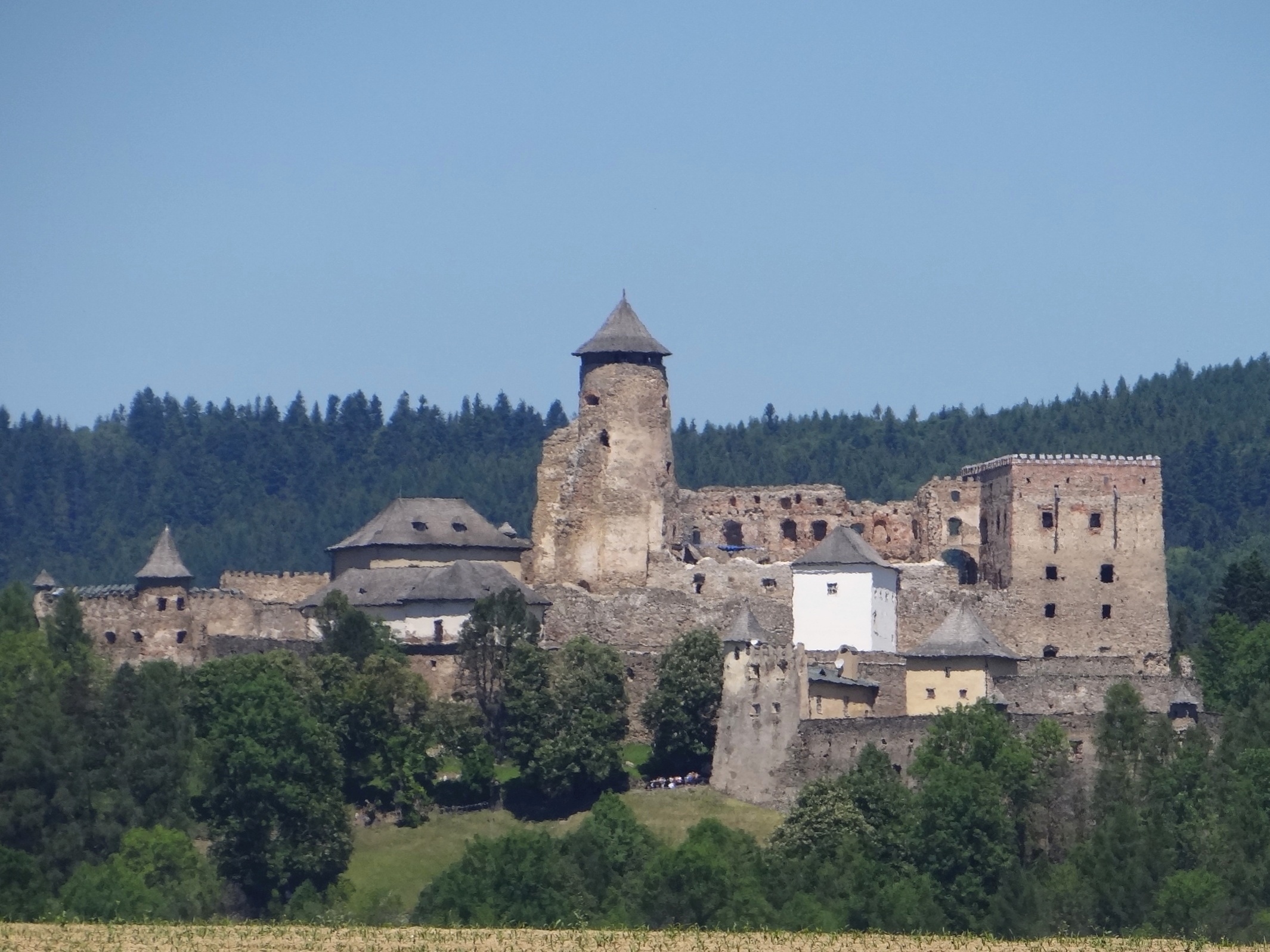

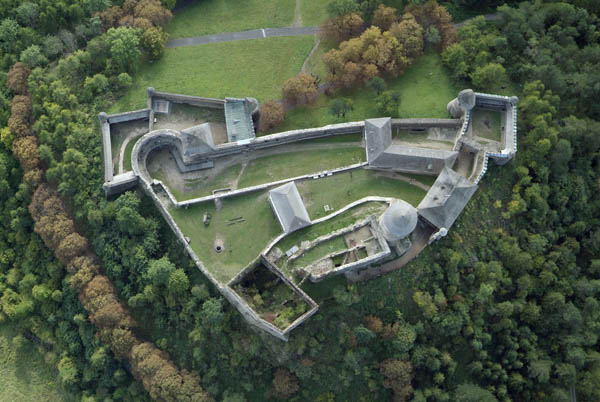
- Bird's eye view of the castle

Site information
- Type: Castle
- Controlled by: Cultural Heritage Monuments of Slovakia
- Open to the public: yes
- Condition: Partly a permanent ruin, partly rebuilt

Location
- Height: 548 m n. m.

Site history
- Built: 13th Century

Ľubovňa Castle (Slovak: Ľubovniansky hrad, Hungarian: Lubló vára, Polish: Zamek Lubowelski) is a medieval castle located in the city of Stará Ľubovňa in Slovakia.

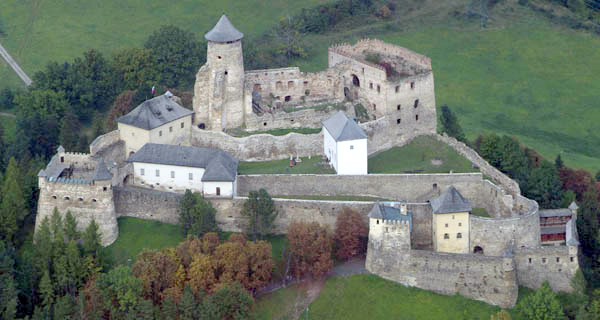
An aerial photograph of the castle.

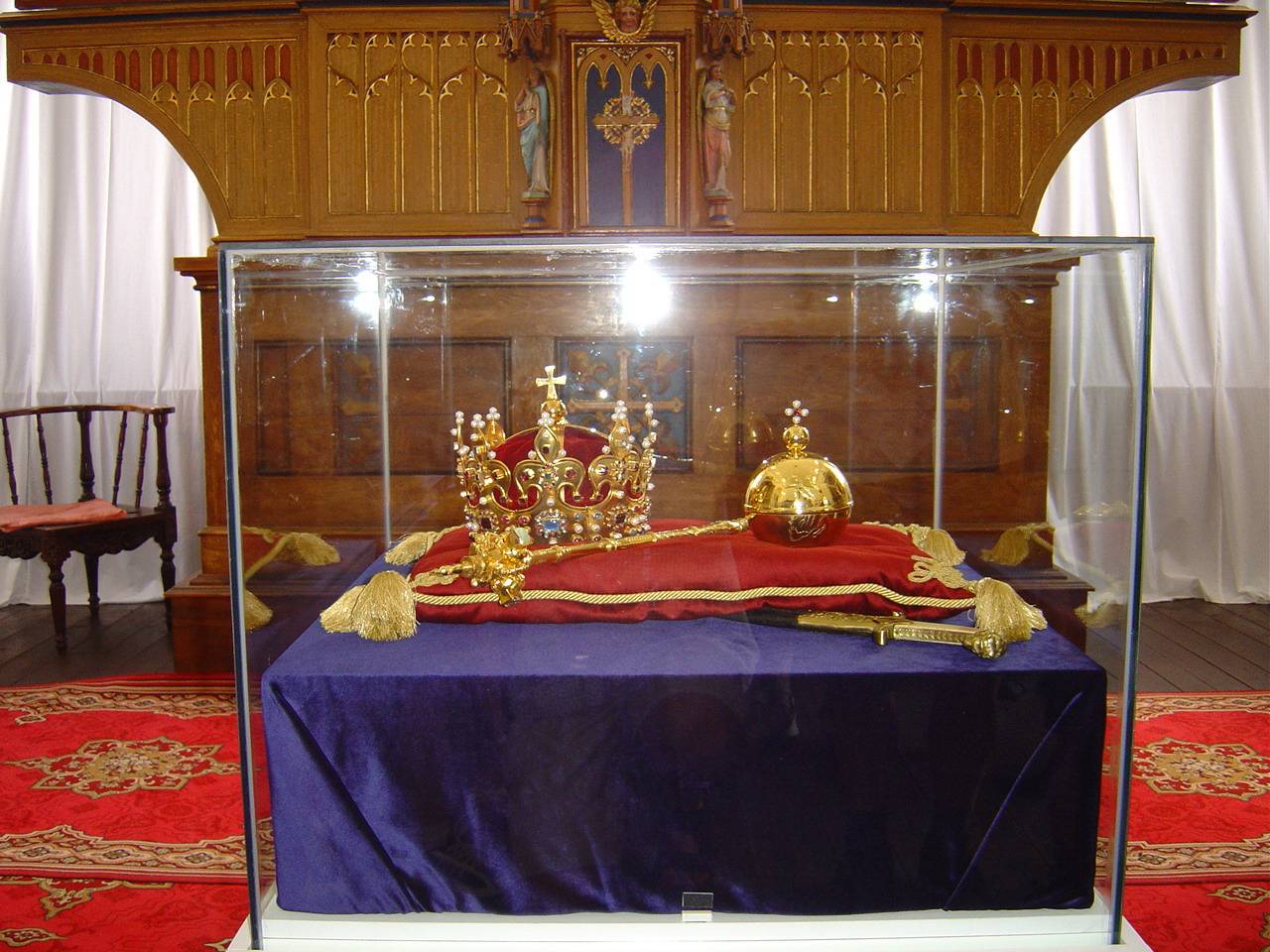
Replicas of Polish crown jewels, made in 2003.

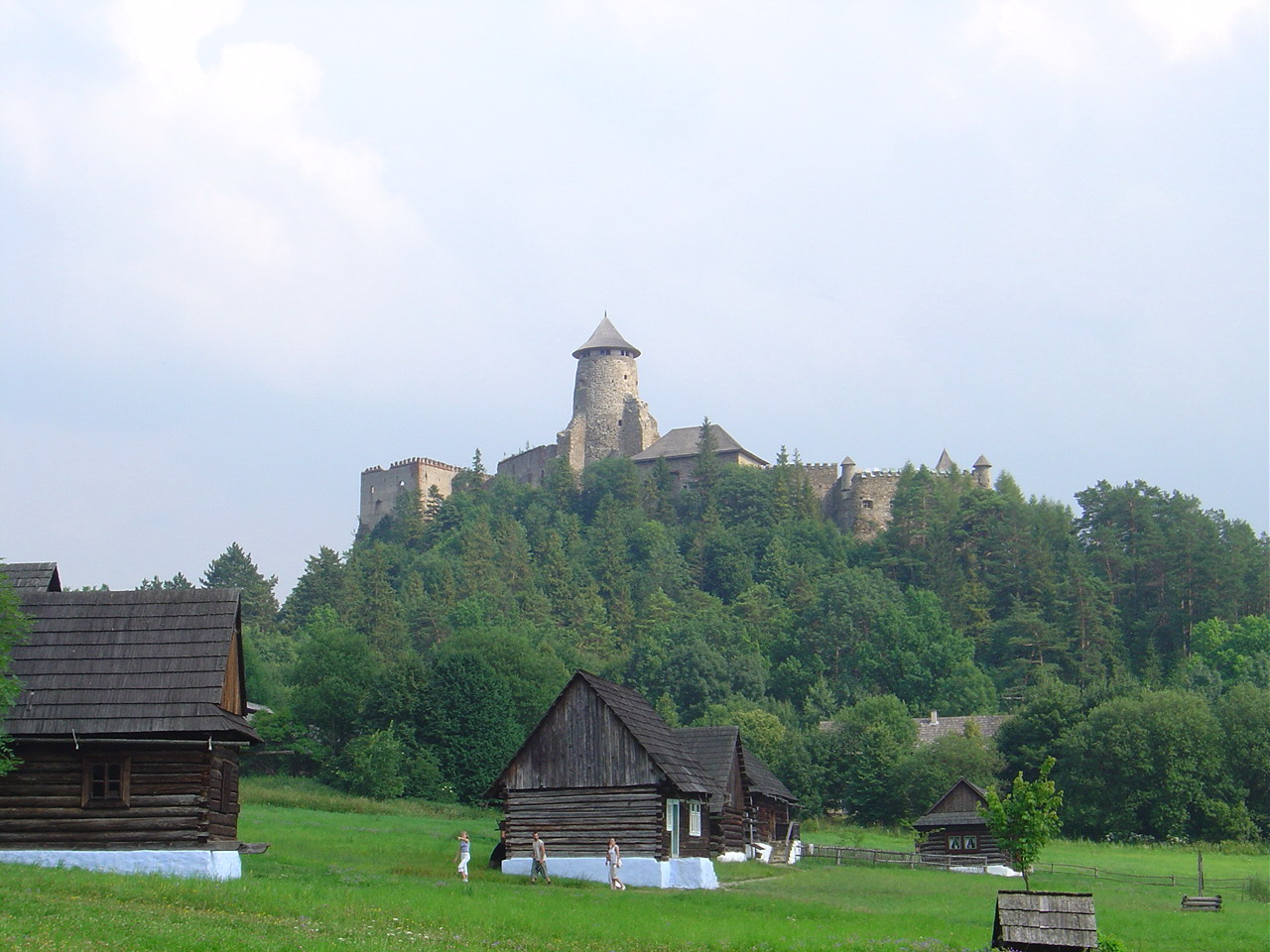
Ľubovňa Castle and the open-air folk museum.

== See also ==
- List of castles in Slovakia
