= Zawisza the Black =

Polish knight and diplomat (c. 1379 – 1428)

- Knight
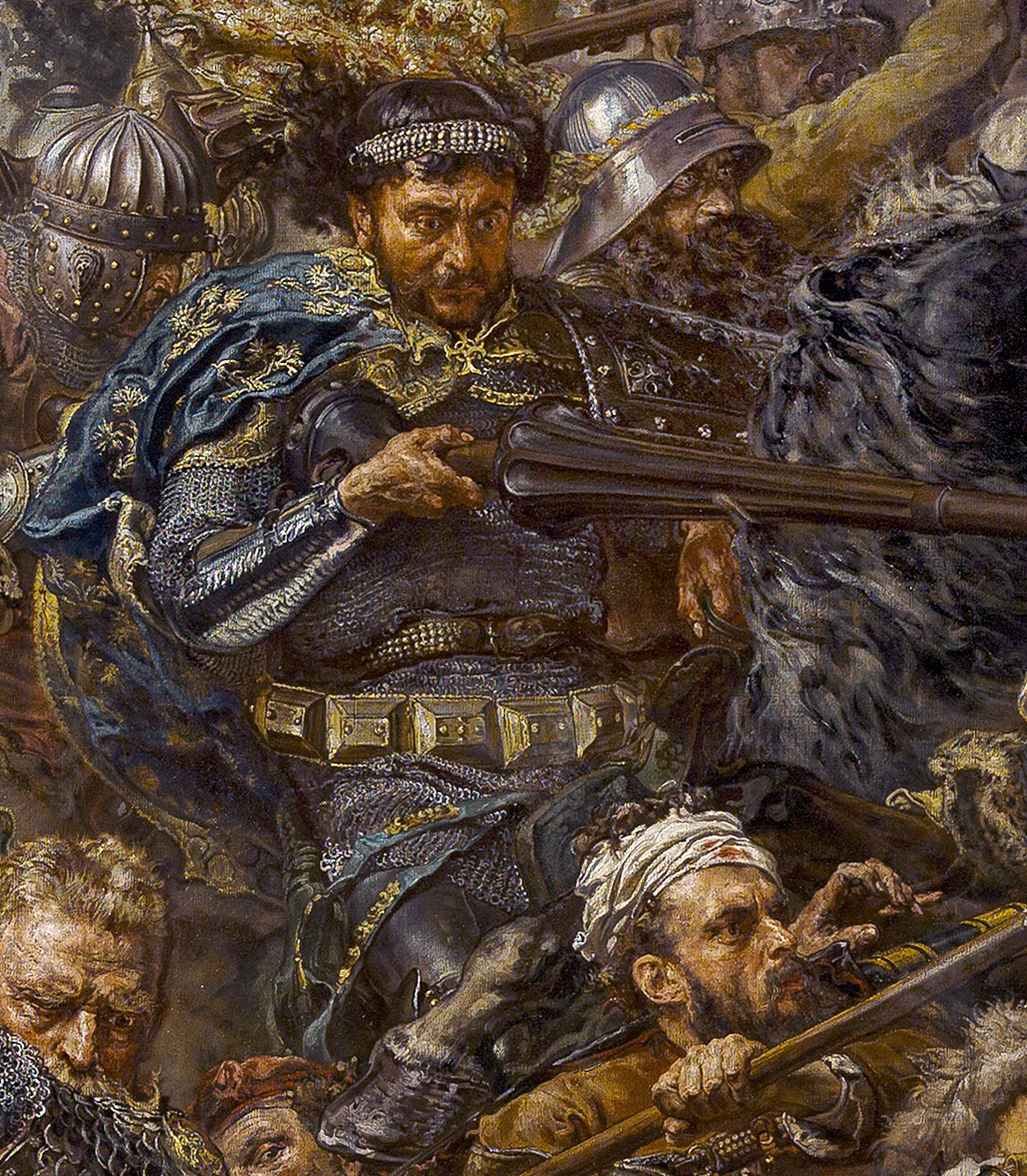
- Zawisza the Black in a detail of Jan Matejko's Battle of Grunwald

- Coat of arms
- Born: c. 1379; Stary Garbów, Kingdom of Poland
- Died: 12 June 1428; Golubac, Serbian Despotate
- Wife: Barbara
- Memorials: Golubac fortress

Zawisza the Black of Garbów, (Note: Polish: Zawisza Czarny z Garbowa, pronunciation: [zaˈvʲiʂa ˈt͡ʂarn̪ɨ]; Latin: Zawissius Niger de Garbow) of Sulima coat of arms (c. 1379 – 12 June 1428), was a Polish knight and nobleman who served as a commander and diplomat under Polish king Władysław II Jagiełło and Hungarian-Bohemian king Sigismund of Luxembourg. During his life, he was regarded as a model of knightly virtues and was renowned for winning multiple tournaments.

== Name ==
Historians propose two possible theories to the origins of Zawisza's nickname Black (Polish: Czarny). According to more popular, and more probable, theory, his nickname came from his black hair. The second theory proposes that the nickname came from his custom-made, black armour.

== Origin ==
Zawisza was born in Stary Garbów, Kingdom of Poland (in modern south-eastern Poland), into a local noble family (of the Sulima), his father Mikołaj being the castellan of Konary-Sieradz (konarsko-sieradzki), while his mother was named Dorota. He had two younger brothers: Jan Farurej, the starost of Spisz; and Piotr Kruczek. In 1397, Zawisza married Barbara of the Pilawa clan, the niece of Bishop of Kraków Piotr Wysz, and they had four sons.

== 1410–1419 ==
Briefly in the service of the Teutonic Order, he soon renounced it, and in 1410 he took part in the Battle of Grunwald on the Polish side. After the battle he and his close friend Stibor of Stiboricz proposed a peace treaty between Władysław II Jagiełło of Poland and Sigismund of Luxembourg, then King of Hungary, which came to be known as the Treaty of Lubowla. In 1412 he participated in the conference between Sigismund, Wladyslaw II and Tvrtko II of Bosnia at Buda, where he won the tournament held there, with 1,500 knights present.

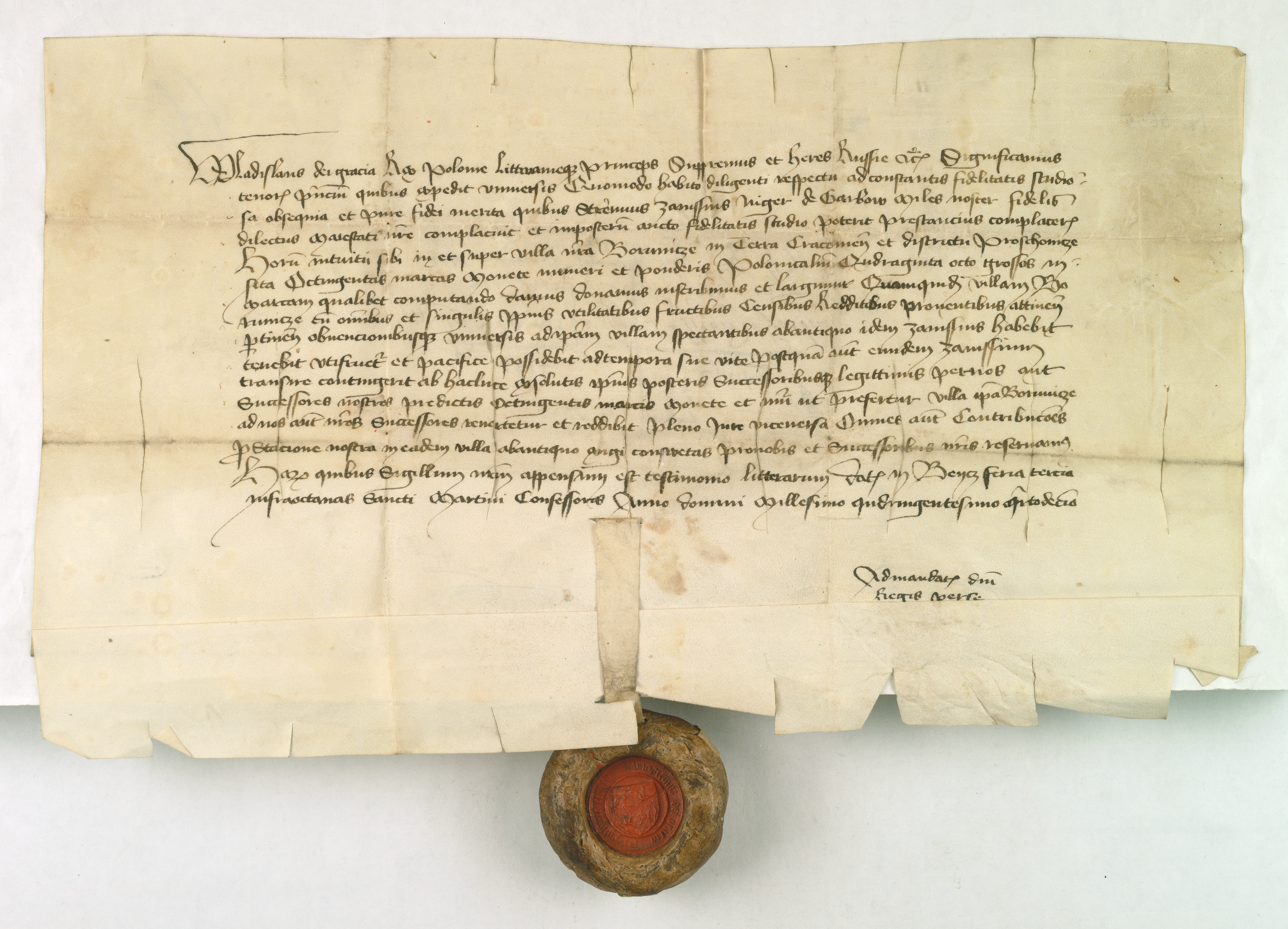
Grant of 800 grzywna by King Władysław Jagiełło to Zawisza the Black in 1414.

Zawisza was as much a diplomat as he was a warrior, being an envoy for the Polish king Władysław II and Hungarian-Bohemian king Sigismund of Luxembourg. As one of six diplomats that represented the Polish Kingdom and King Władysław II at the Council of Constance, he was one of very few supporters of Jan Hus, and consequently strongly opposed his condemnation and subsequent execution for heresy.

In 1416, Zawisza participated in a tournament at Perpignan in which he defeated the well-known knight John II of Aragon and Navarre. The following year, he became the starosta of Kruszwica. In 1419, he went to Sigismund again, as a deputy of King Władysław II, to ask for the hand of Sophia of Bavaria, the widow of Sigismund's brother Wenceslaus of Bohemia. Subsequently, Zawisza participated in the Hussite Wars on the side of King Sigismund. During Sigismund's defeat at Kutná Hora (21 December 1421), Zawisza was taken prisoner by the Hussites and subsequently released in return for a high ransom.

== War against Ottomans and death ==
In 1428, Zawisza, with his retinue as a commander of a light cavalry banner of 500 horsemen, joined the forces of Sigismund in the king's war against the Ottoman Turks. During that disastrous campaign he fought them at the Siege of Golubac on the Danube in modern-day Serbia. Sigismund's army was defeated and had to retreat across the Danube, with only a few boats to ferry the troops over to safety. Zawisza's banner was guarding the retreating army. Being a man of importance, he was personally sent for by King Sigismund. Disheartened by the king's apparent cowardice, he allegedly refused to retreat, saying, "There is no boat big enough to lift my honour." He was either killed in combat at Golubac or executed in Ottoman captivity.

== Family ==
Zawisza was survived by his wife Barbara and their children:

- Marcin, fell at the Battle of Varna in 1444.
- Stanisław, fell at the Battle of Varna in 1444.
- Zawisza (II).
- Jan, starost of Koło, who was killed at the Battle of Chojnice (1454).
- Barbara.

He had a granddaughter, Barbara of Roznow, who was the mother of the Polish Renaissance military commander, hetman Jan Tarnowski. Among further descendants of Zawisza were Stanisław Koniecpolski, Bogusław Radziwiłł, governor of the Duchy of Prussia, and Henryk Dobrzański, the first guerrilla commander in World War II in Europe.

== Legacy ==
During his life, he was regarded as a model of knightly virtues. After his death, he was praised by the Polish historian Jan Długosz, the poet and Canon of Gniezno Adam Świnka, and by King Sigismund of Luxembourg. Zawisza became a folk hero in Poland, famed for reliability, and loyalty. The Polish Scouts oath reads partly: "...polegać na nim jak na Zawiszy" ('[you can] rely on him as on Zawisza'). Several Polish football clubs and other sports teams were named after him, including, Zawisza Bydgoszcz.

In Serbia, where the Golubac Fortress is located and where he is known as Zaviša Crni (Serbian Cyrillic: Завиша Црни), he was revered as a brave knight. A monument to Zawisza at Golubac Fortress bears the inscription: "In Golubac, his life was taken by the Turks in 1428, the famous Polish knight, the symbol of courage and honor, Zawisza the Black. Glory to the hero!" Also, in the reconstructed fortress, there is a permanent exhibition celebrating knights who defended the fortress, with a special section dedicated to Zawisza. In Belgrade, Serbian capital, there is a street named after him in the neighborhood of Senjak (Улица Завише Црног/Ulica Zaviše Crnog).

Several dramas have been made based on his life.

He appears in the video game Kingdom Come: Deliverance II as a side character

Zawisza Czarny is also the name of two Polish sailing ships owned by the Polish Scouting and Guiding Association, ZHP.[

== Bibliography ==
- Beata Możejko; Sobiesław Szybkowski; Błażej Śliwiński (2003). Zawisza Czarny z Garbowa herbu Sulima. Wydawn. WiM. ISBN 978-83-918873-4-9.
- Anna Klubówna (1974). Zawisza Czarny w historii i legendzie. Ludowa Spółdzielnia Wydawnicza.
- Katarzyna Beliniak (2007). Zawisza Czarny - człowiek legenda. De Agostini Polska. ISBN 978-83-248-0627-0.
- Stefan M. Kuczyński (1983). Zawisza Czarny: powieść historyczna. Śląsk. ISBN 978-83-216-0317-9.
- Ignacy Kozielewski (1928). Zawisza Czarny. Dobra Prasa.
