= Dwikozy =

- Village
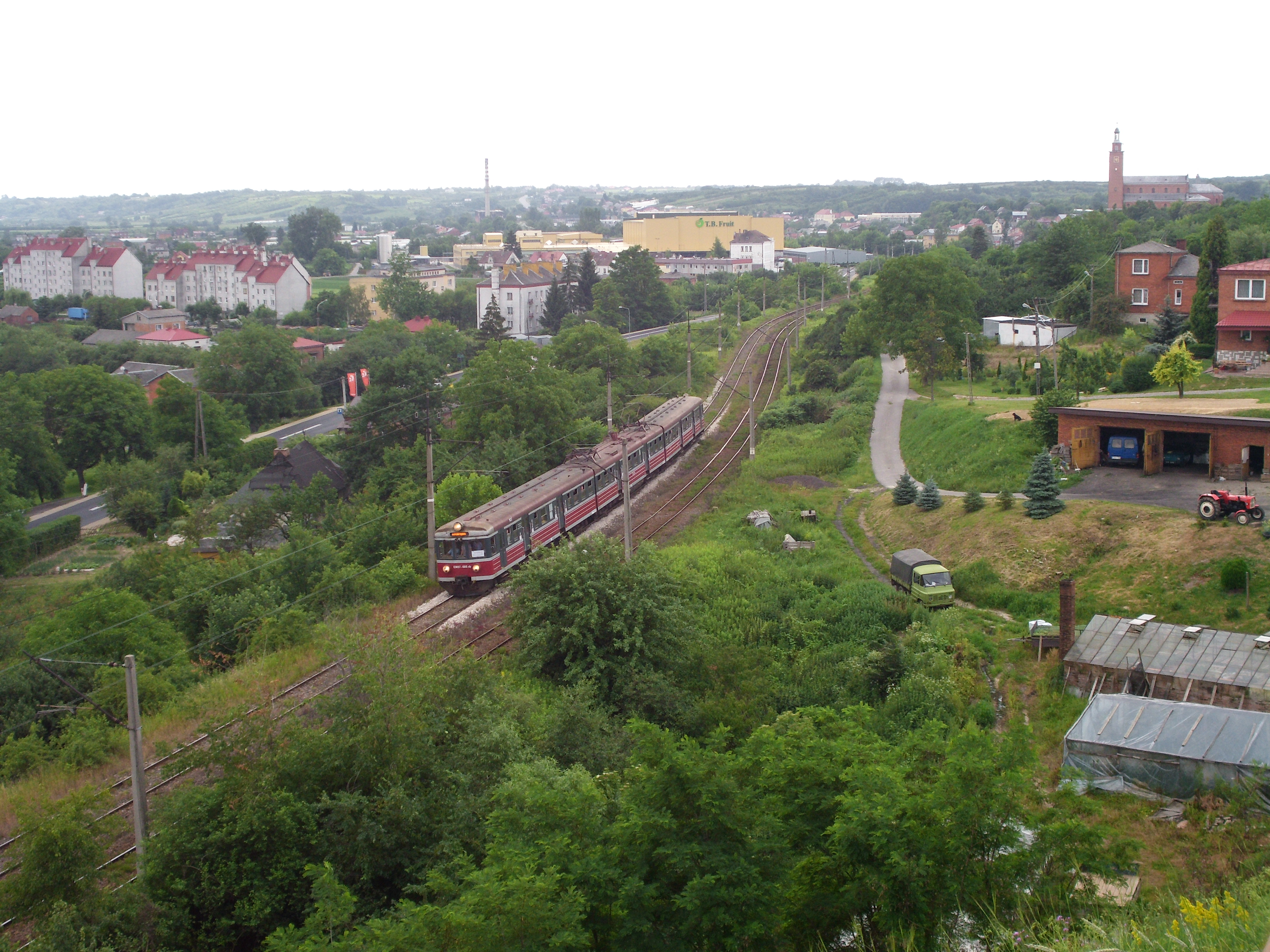

- Coat of arms

- Location within Poland
- Coordinates: 50°43′56″N 21°47′11″E
- Country: Poland
- Voivodeship: Świętokrzyskie
- County: Sandomierz
- Gmina: Dwikozy
- Population: 2,100

Dwikozy [dviˈkɔzɨ] is a village in Sandomierz County, Świętokrzyskie Voivodeship, in south-central Poland. It is the seat of the gmina (administrative district) called Gmina Dwikozy. It lies approximately 7 km (4 mi) north-east of Sandomierz and 84 km (52 mi) east of the regional capital Kielce.

In 1938, a large food processing plant was built in Dwikozy, as part of Polish Central Industrial Area. The plant still exists, producing jams, juices, marmalades and paste.
