= List of castles in Poland =

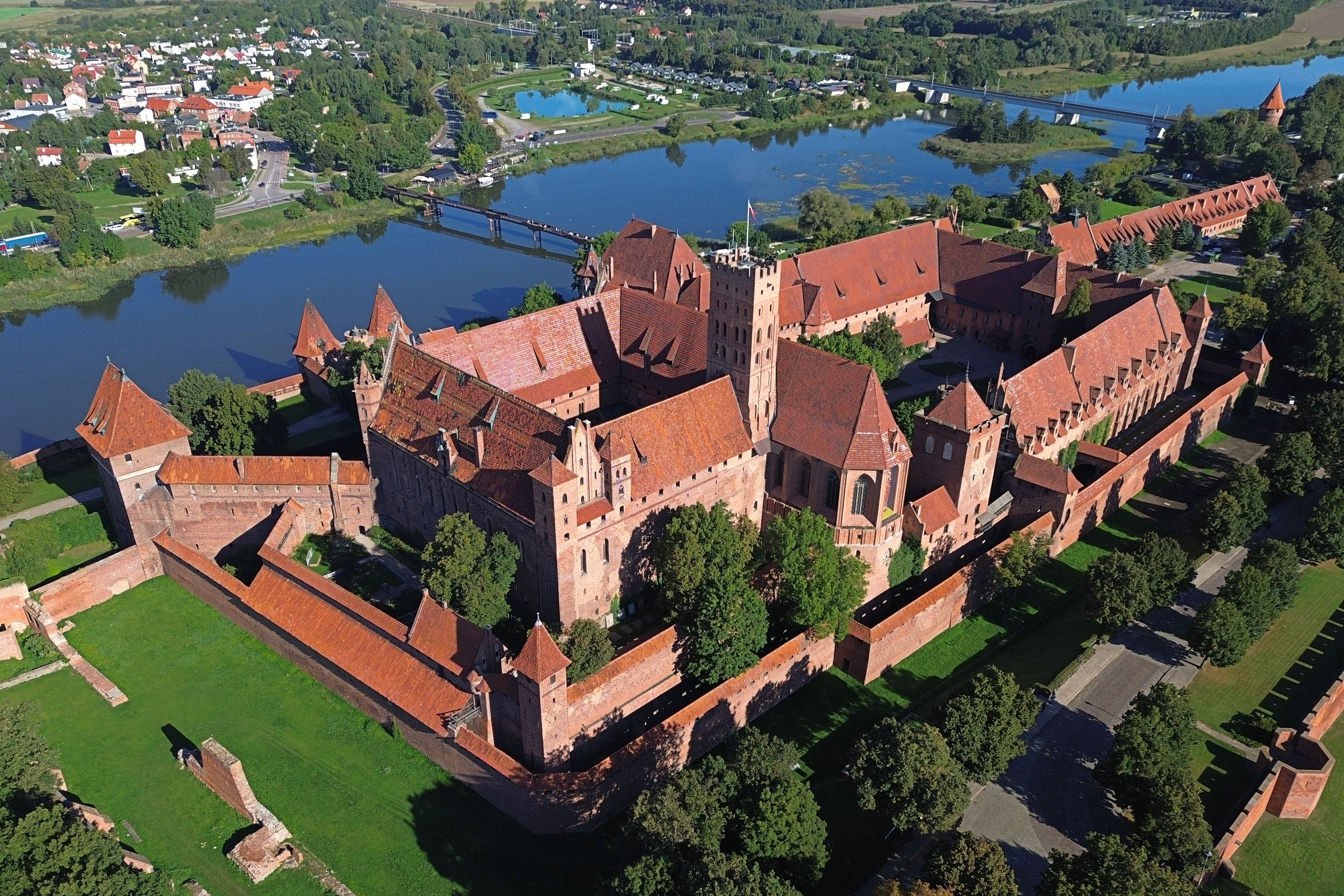
Malbork Castle, a UNESCO World Heritage Site

This is a list of castles in Poland in alphabetical order, based on similar lists compiled by various sight-seeing societies.

== B ==
- Baligród Castle – Subcarpathian Voivodeship
- Baranów Sandomierski Castle – Subcarpathian Voivodeship

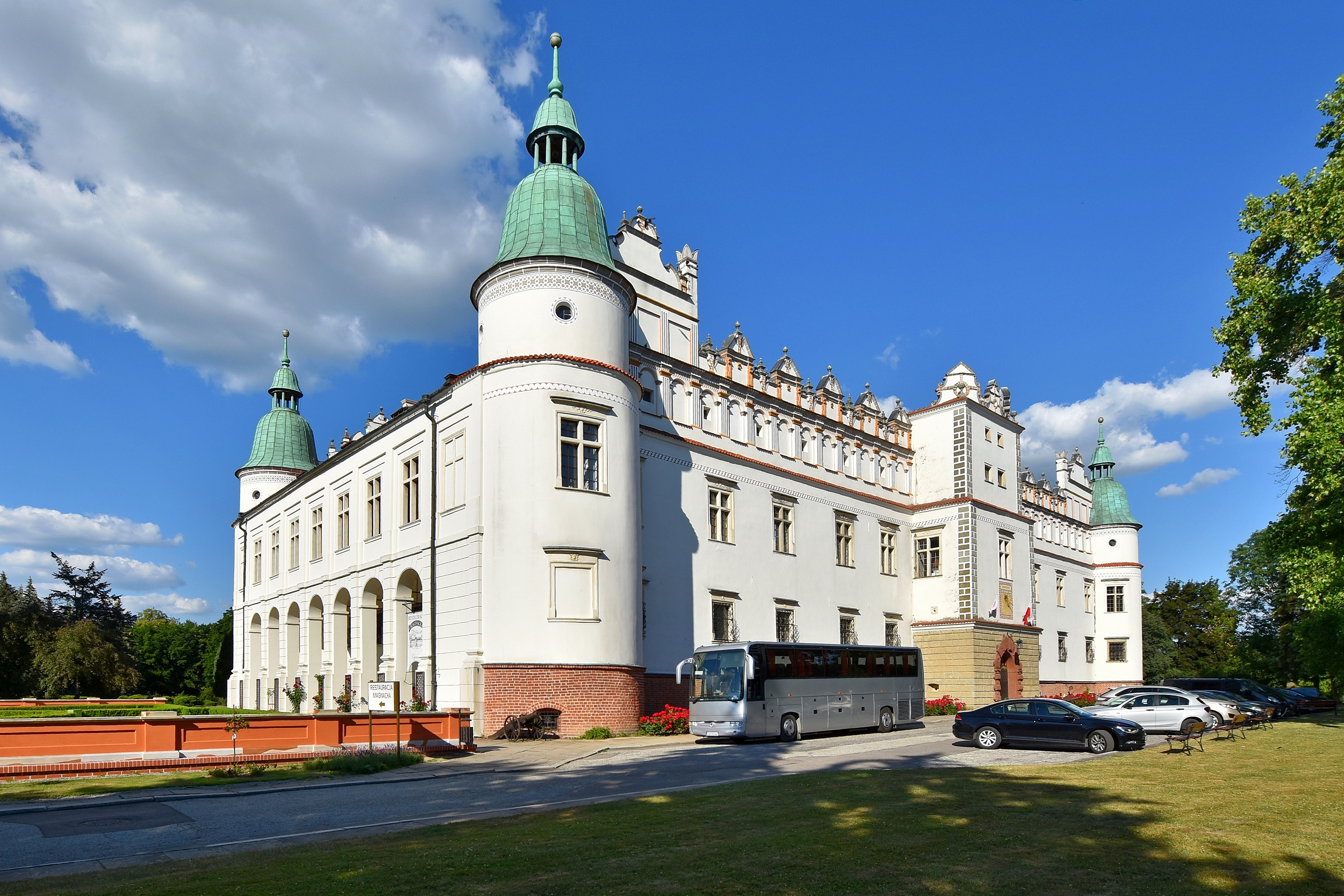
Baranów Sandomierski Castle

- Barciany Castle – Warmian-Masurian Voivodeship
- Barczewko Castle – Warmian-Masurian Voivodeship
- Bardo – Lower Silesian Voivodeship
- Bąkowa Góra – Łódź Voivodeship
- Bąkowiec Castle – Silesian Voivodeship
- Bełżyce Castle – Lublin Voivodeship
- Besiekiery Castle – Łódź Voivodeship
- Bezławki – Warmian-Masurian Voivodeship
- Będzin Castle – Silesian Voivodeship

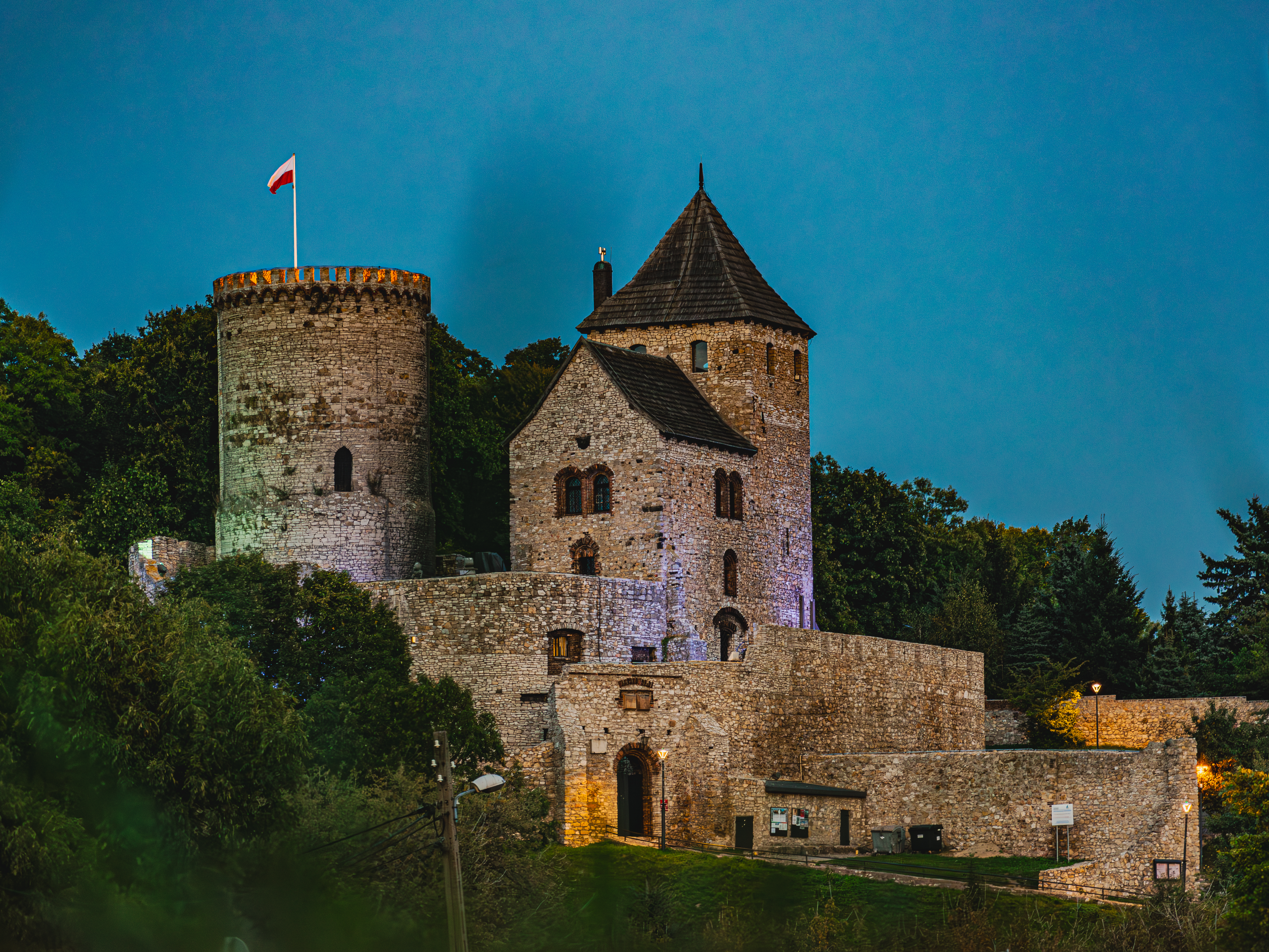
Będzin Castle

- Biała Prudnicka Castle – Opole Voivodeship
- Białoboki Castle – Subcarpathian Voivodeship
- Biały Bór Castle – West Pomeranian Voivodeship
- Biecz Castle – Lesser Poland Voivodeship
- Bielsko-Biała Castle – Silesian Voivodeship
- Bircza – Subcarpathian Voivodeship
- Biskupiec Castle – Warmian-Masurian Voivodeship
- Biskupin Castle – Kuyavian-Pomeranian Voivodeship
- Bobolice Castle – Silesian Voivodeship

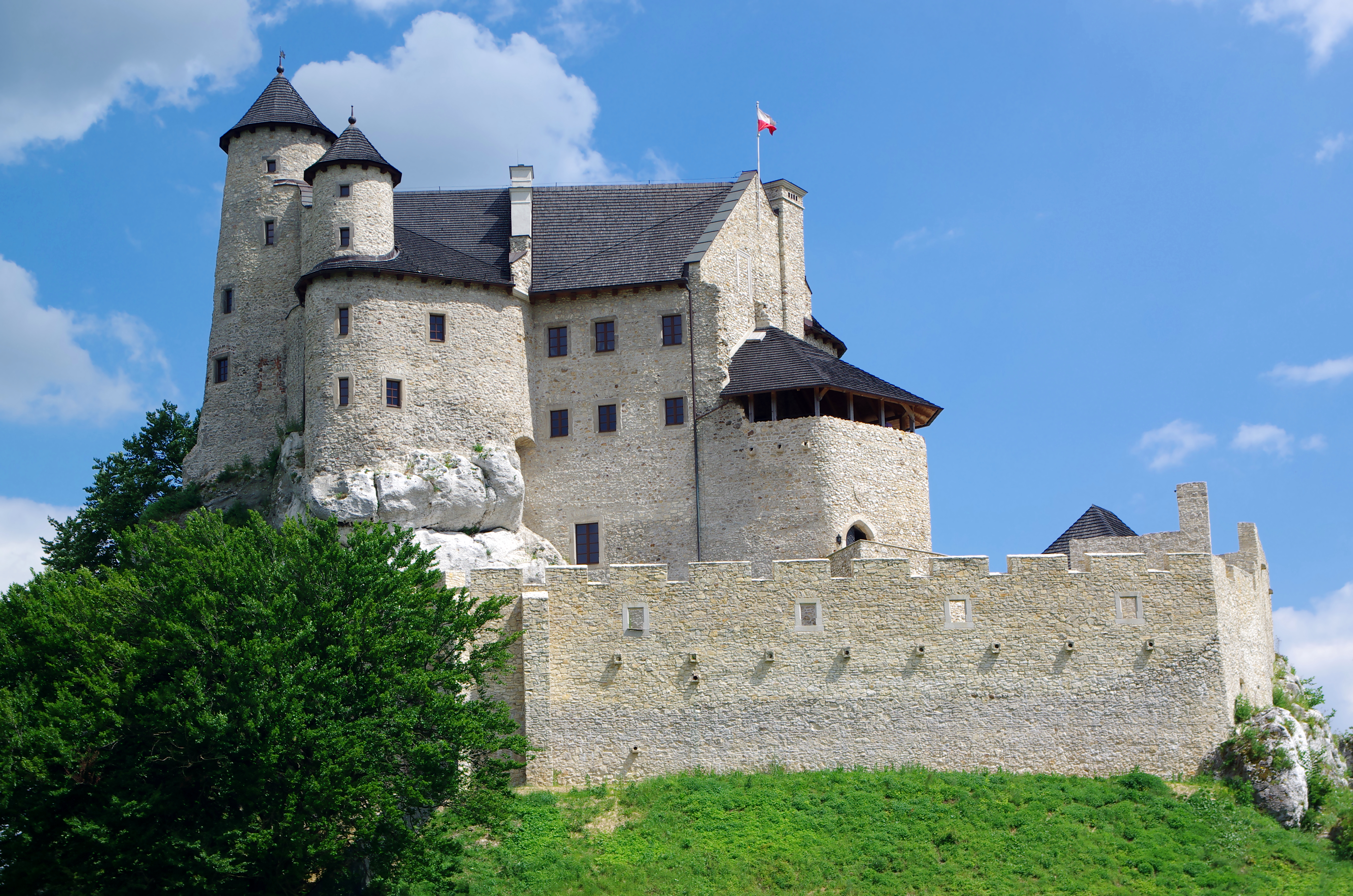
Bobolice Castle

- Bobrowniki Castle – Kuyavian-Pomeranian Voivodeship (ruins)
- Bochotnica Castle – Lublin Voivodeship
- Bodzentyn Castle – Świętokrzyskie Voivodeship
- Bolcz Castle – Lower Silesian Voivodeship
- Bolesławiec Castle – Łódź Voivodeship
- Bolków Castle – Lower Silesian Voivodeship
- Borysławice Zamkowe – Greater Poland Voivodeship (ruins)
- Braniewo Castle – Warmian-Masurian Voivodeship
- Bratian – Warmian-Masurian Voivodeship (ruins)
- Breń Castle – Lesser Poland Voivodeship
- Brodnica Castle – Kuyavian-Pomeranian Voivodeship (only tower preserved)
- Brok Castle in Brok, Masovian Voivodeship (ruins)
- Broniszów Castle – Lubusz Voivodeship
- Brzeg Castle – Opole Voivodeship

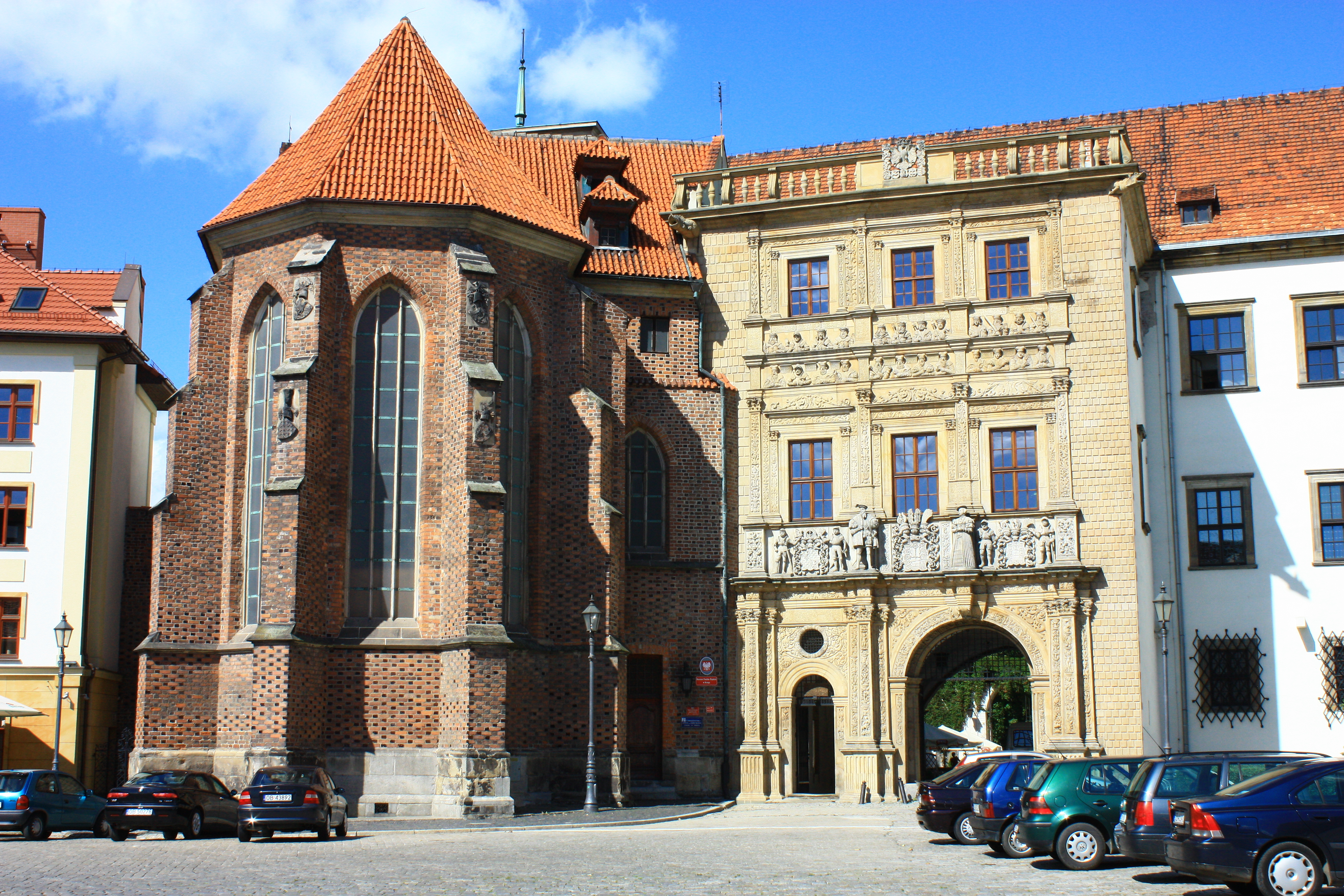
Brzeg Castle

- Bugaj – Greater Poland Voivodeship
- Bychawa Castle – Lublin Voivodeship
- Bydlin Castle – Lesser Poland Voivodeship (ruins)
- Byki Castle in Piotrków Trybunalski – Łódź Voivodeship
- Bytów Castle – Pomeranian Voivodeship

== C ==
- Chałupki Castle – Silesian Voivodeship
- Chełm Castle – Lublin Voivodeship
- Chęciny Castle – Świętokrzyskie Voivodeship

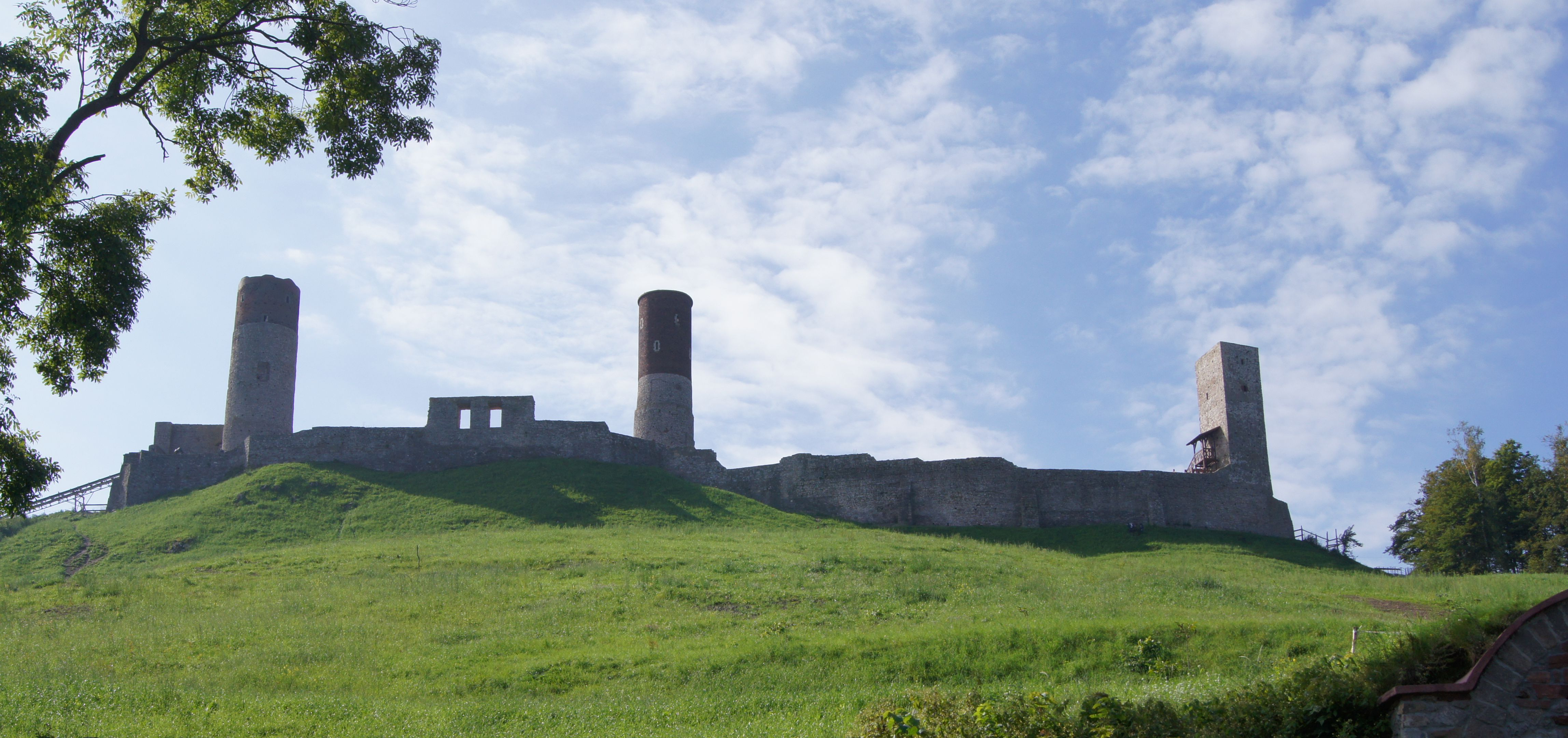
Chęciny Castle

- Chlewiska Castle – Masovian Voivodeship
- Chobienia Castle – Lower Silesian Voivodeship
- Chocianowiec Castle – Lower Silesian Voivodeship
- Chojnik Castle in Jelenia Góra – Lower Silesian Voivodeship

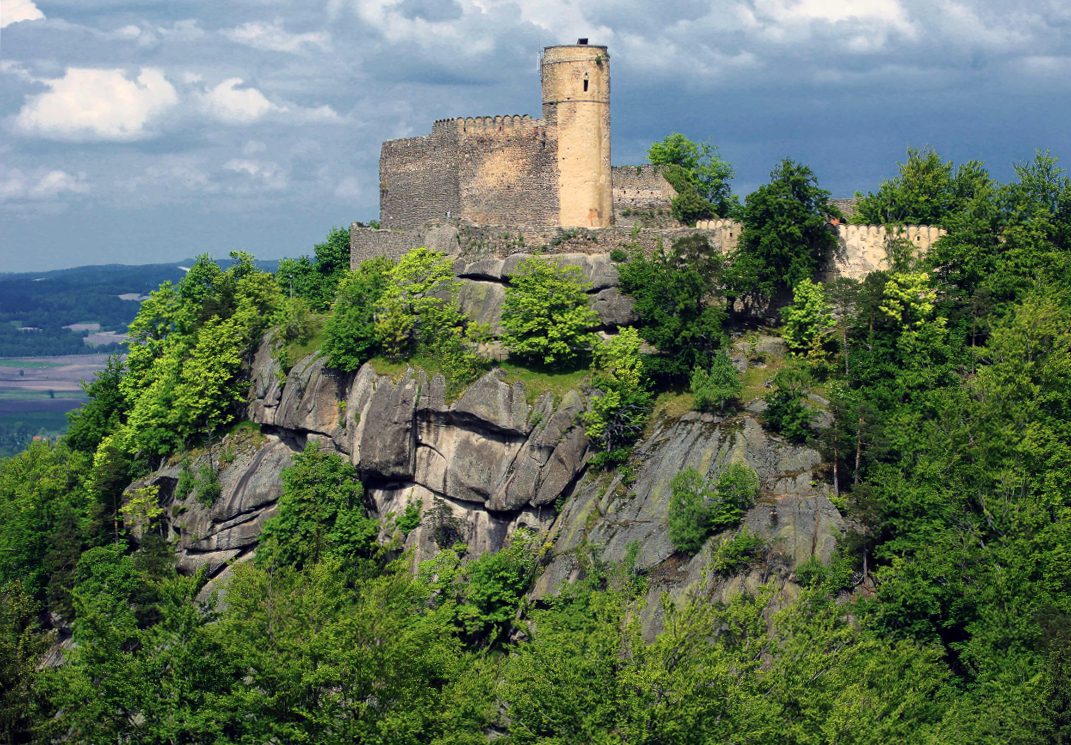
Chojnik Castle

- Chojnów Castle – Lower Silesian Voivodeship
- Chrzelice Castle – Opole Voivodeship
- Chudów Castle – Silesian Voivodeship
- Ciechanów Castle in Ciechanów, Masovian Voivodeship
- Ciepłowody Castle – Lower Silesian Voivodeship
- Cisy Castle near Cieszów, Lower Silesian Voivodeship
- Copice Palace
- Czarny Bór Castle – Lower Silesian Voivodeship
- Czchów Castle – Lesser Poland Voivodeship
- Czechów – Lubusz Voivodeship
- Czernina Dolna Castle – Lower Silesian Voivodeship
- Częstochowa Castle – Silesian Voivodeship
- Czernica Castle – Lower Silesian Voivodeship
- Czersk Castle – Masovian Voivodeship

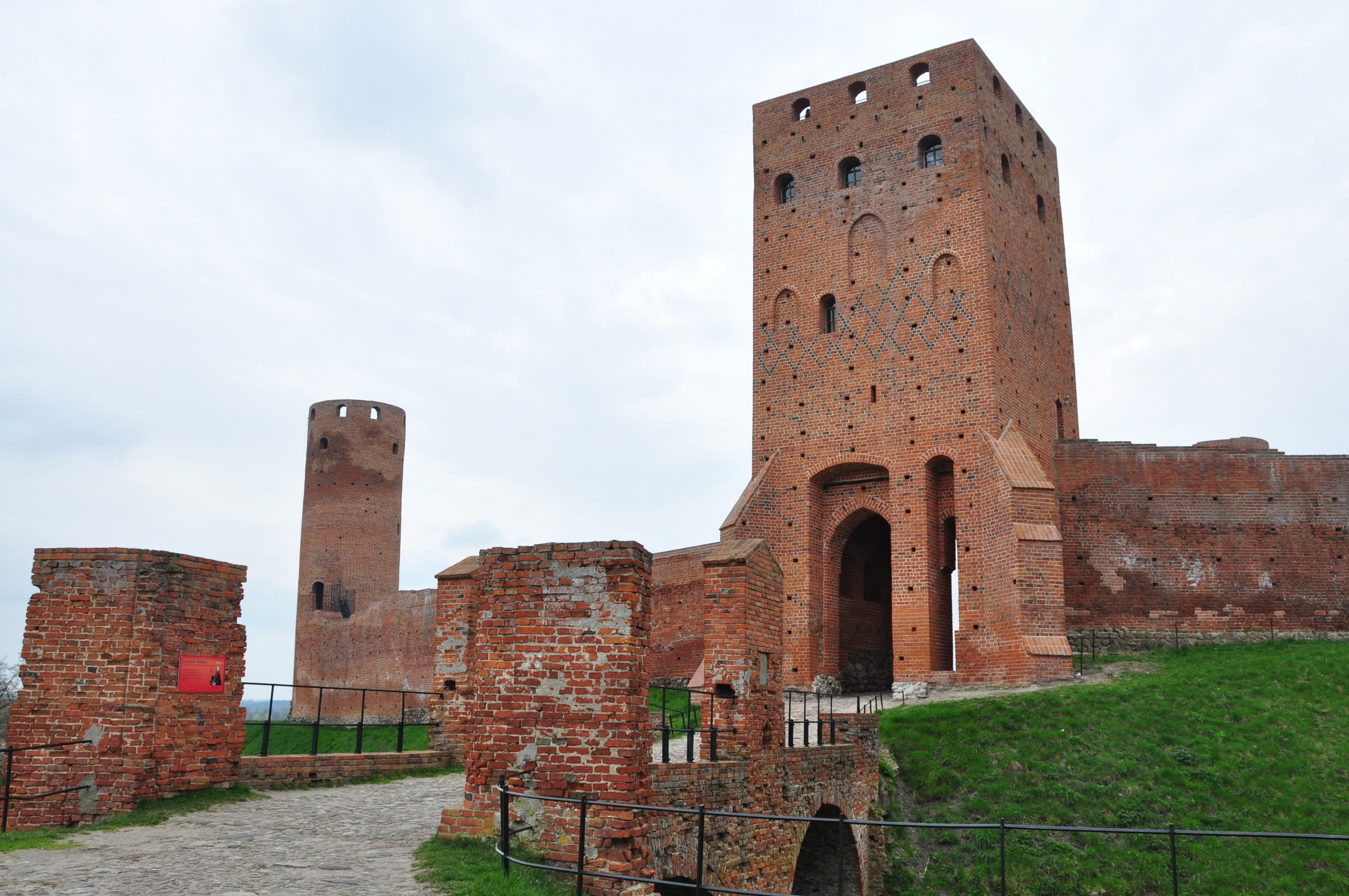
Czersk Castle

- Człuchów Castle – Pomeranian Voivodeship
- Czocha Castle – Lower Silesian Voivodeship

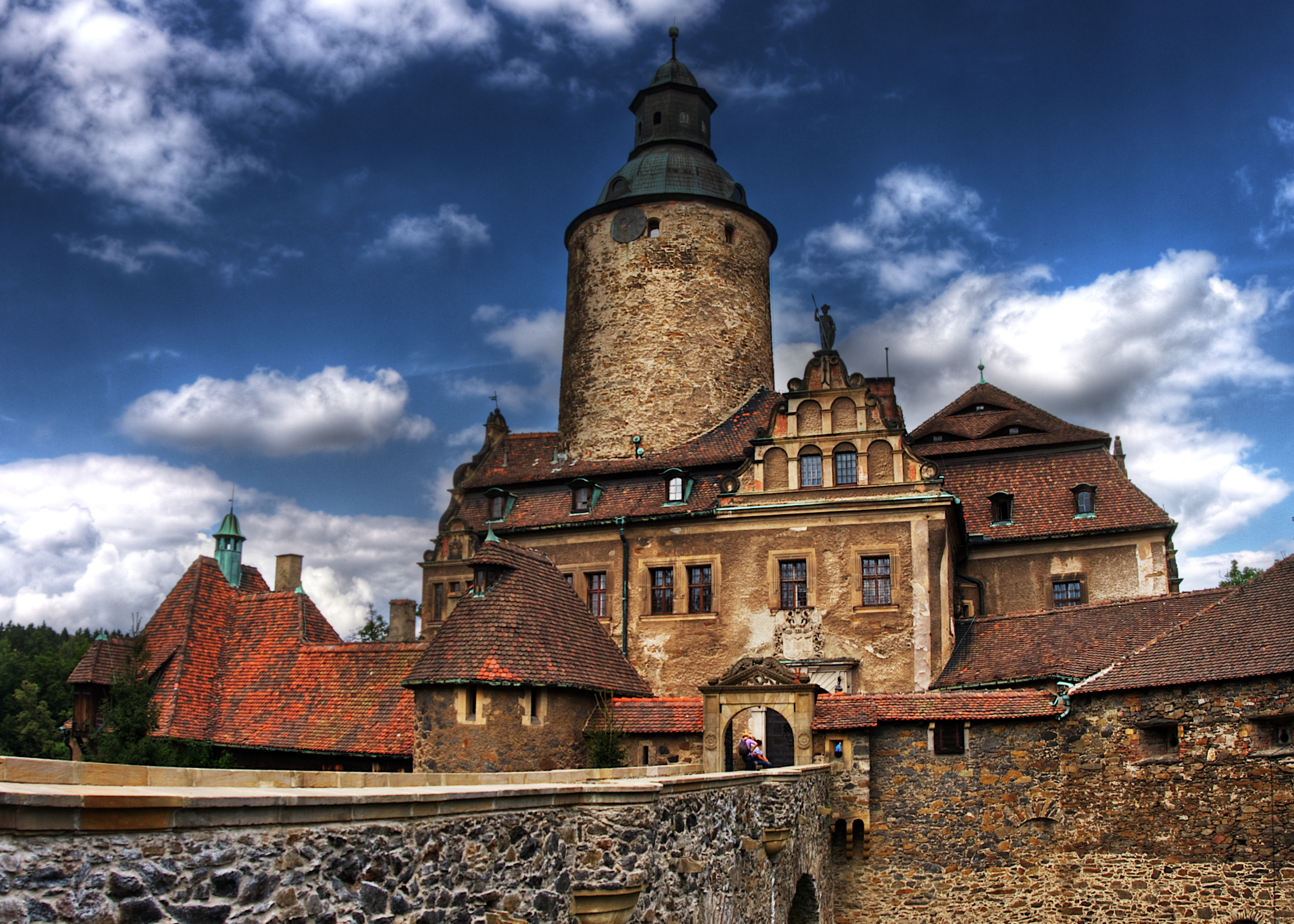
Czocha Castle

- Czorsztyn Castle – Lesser Poland Voivodeship
- Czudec Castle – Subcarpathian Voivodeship
- Czyżów Szlachecki Castle – Świętokrzyskie Voivodeship

== Ć ==
- Ćmielów Castle – Świętokrzyskie Voivodeship (ruins)

== D ==
- Darłowo Castle in Darłowo, West Pomeranian Voivodeship
- Dąbrowa Tarnowska Castle – Lesser Poland Voivodeship
- Dębno Castle – Lesser Poland Voivodeship
- Dobczyce Castle – Lesser Poland Voivodeship
- Dobra – West Pomeranian Voivodeship (ruins)
- Drahim Castle in Stare Drawsko, West Pomeranian Voivodeship (ruins)
- Drzewica Castle – Łódź Voivodeship
- Dybów Castle in Toruń, Kuyavian-Pomeranian Voivodeship
- Działdowo Castle in Działdowo, Warmian-Masurian Voivodeship
- Dzierzgoń Castle in Dzierzgoń, Pomeranian Voivodeship (ruins)
- Dzików Castle in Tarnobrzeg, Subcarpathian Voivodeship

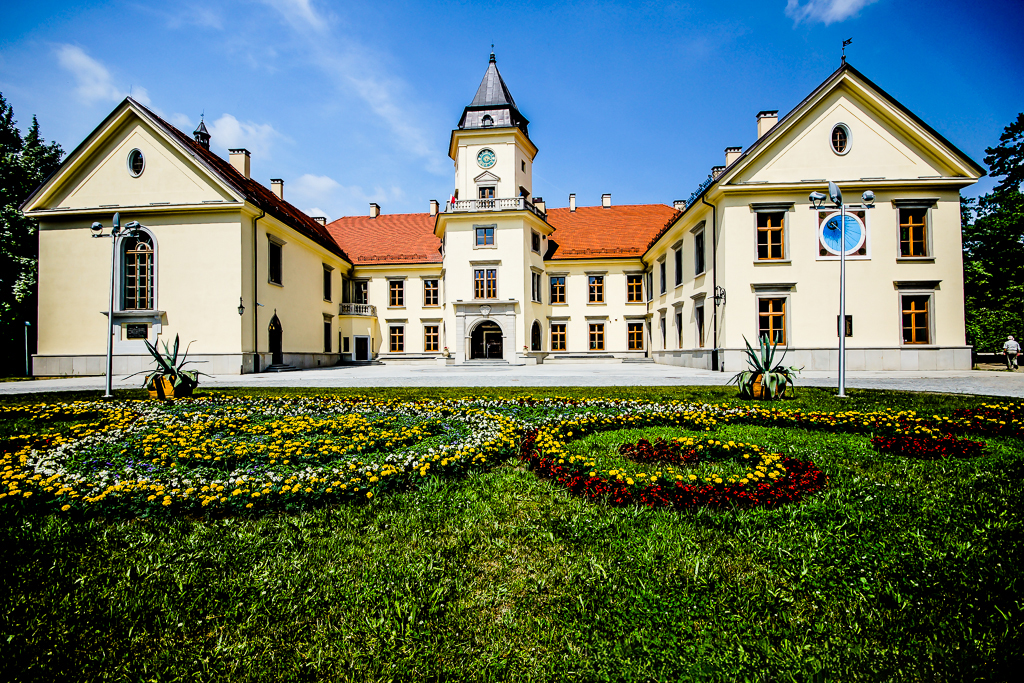
Dzików Castle

- Dźwiniacz Dolny Castle – Subcarpathian Voivodeship

== E ==
- Ełk Castle in Ełk, Warmian-Masurian Voivodeship

== F ==
- Fałków Castle – Świętokrzyskie Voivodeship
- Frombork Castle – Warmian-Masurian Voivodeship

== G ==
- Giżycko Castle in Giżycko, Warmian-Masurian Voivodeship
- Gliwice Castle in Gliwice, Silesian Voivodeship
- Głogów Castle – Lower Silesian Voivodeship
- Głogówek Castle – Opole Voivodeship
- Gniew Castle – Pomeranian Voivodeship

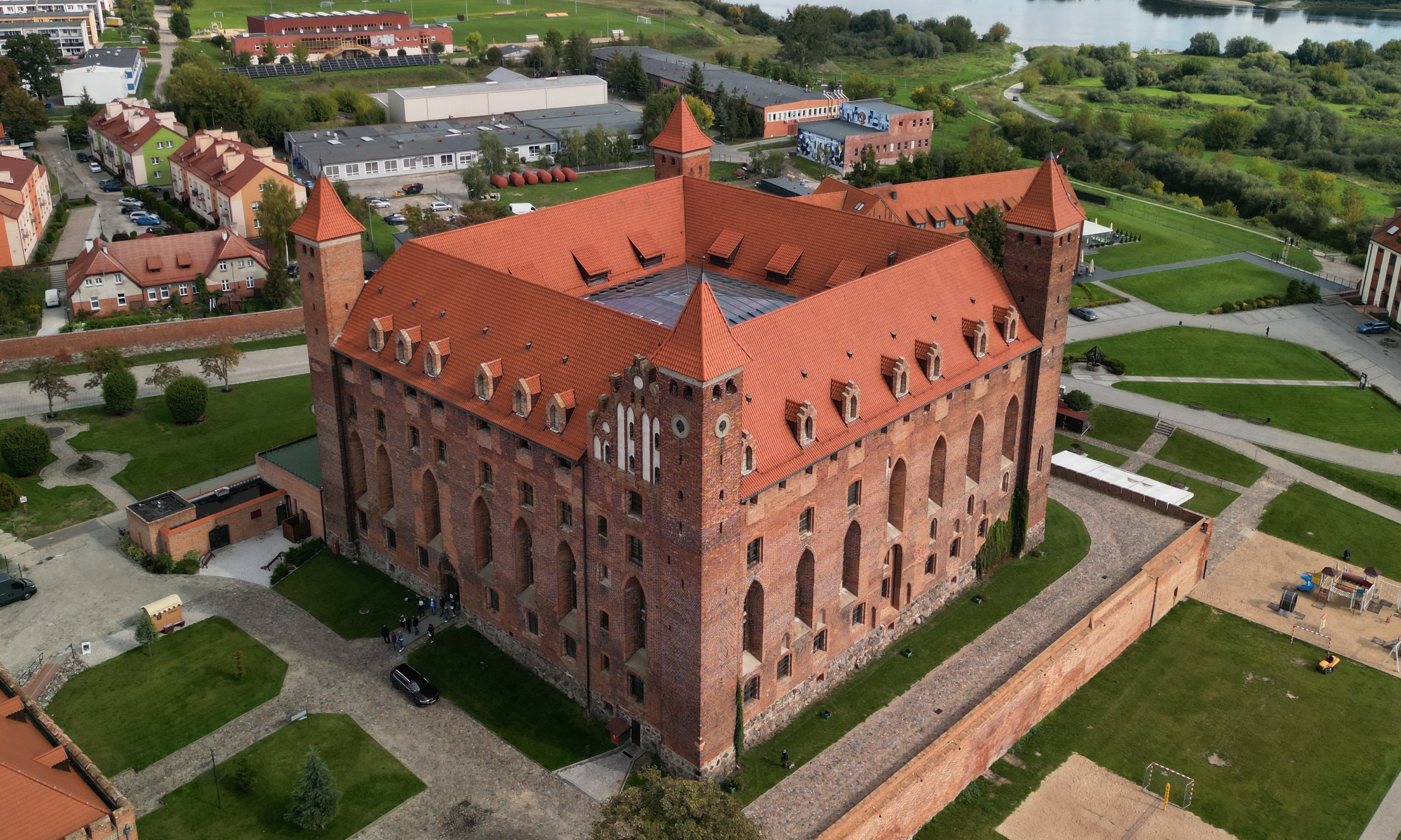
Gniew Castle

- Gola Castle in Gola Dzierżoniowska - Lower Silesian Voivodeship
- Golczewo Castle – West Pomeranian Voivodeship
- Golesz Castle in Krajowice, Subcarpathian Voivodeship (ruins)
- Golub Castle in Golub-Dobrzyń – Kuyavian-Pomeranian Voivodeship

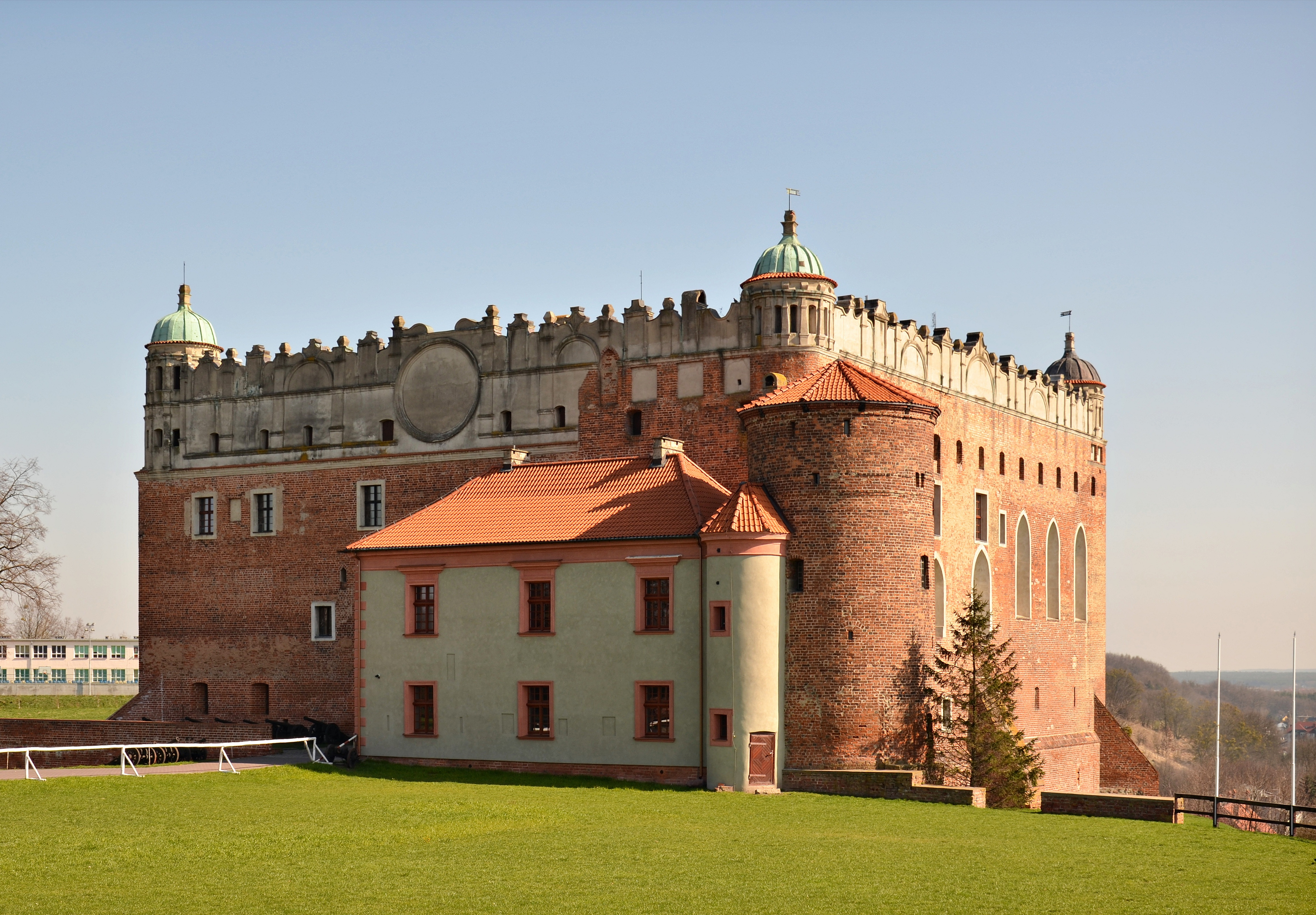
Golub Castle

- Gołańcz Castle – Greater Poland Voivodeship
- Gołuchów Castle – Greater Poland Voivodeship

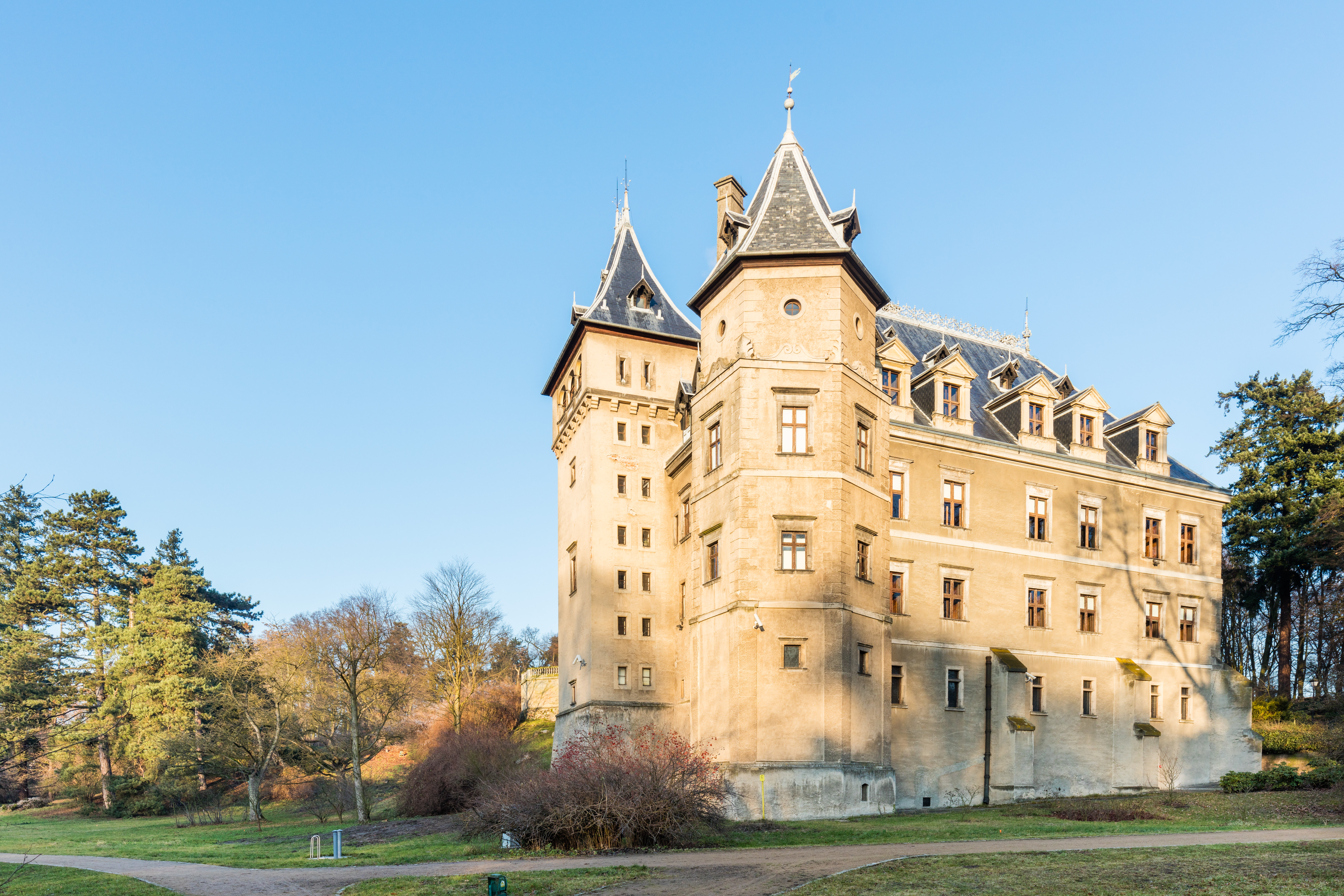
Gołuchów Castle

- Gorzanów Castle - Lower Silesian Voivodeship
- Gorzkowice Castle – Łódź Voivodeship
- Gosławice Castle – Konin, Greater Poland Voivodeship
- Gostynin Castle – Masovian Voivodeship
- Gościszów Castle – Lesser Poland Voivodeship
- Góra Castle – Lower Silesian Voivodeship
- Graboszyce Castle – Lesser Poland Voivodeship
- Gradówek Castle – Lower Silesian Voivodeship
- Grodno Castle in Zagórze Śląskie – Lower Silesian Voivodeship
- Grodztwo Castle in Kamienna Góra – Lower Silesian Voivodeship
- Gródek nad Dunajcem Castle – Lesser Poland Voivodeship
- Grodziec Castle – Lower Silesian Voivodeship

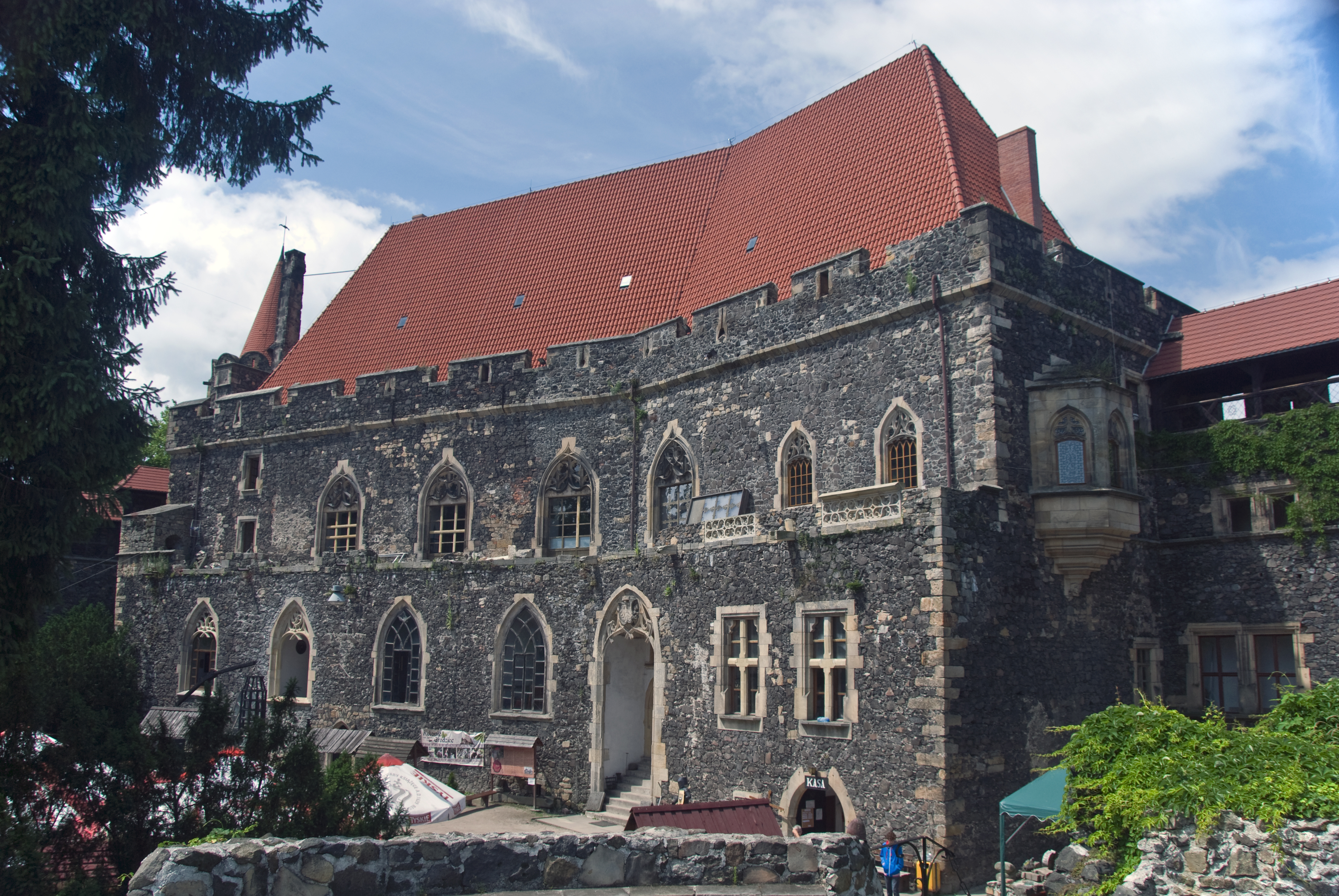
Grodziec Castle

- Gryf Castle in Proszówka – Lower Silesian Voivodeship

== H ==
- Hoczew – Subcarpathian Voivodeship
- Homole – Lower Silesian Voivodeship
- Horodło – Lublin Voivodeship
- Hrubieszów – Lublin Voivodeship

== I ==
- Iłża – Masovian
- Inowłódz – Łódź Voivodeship

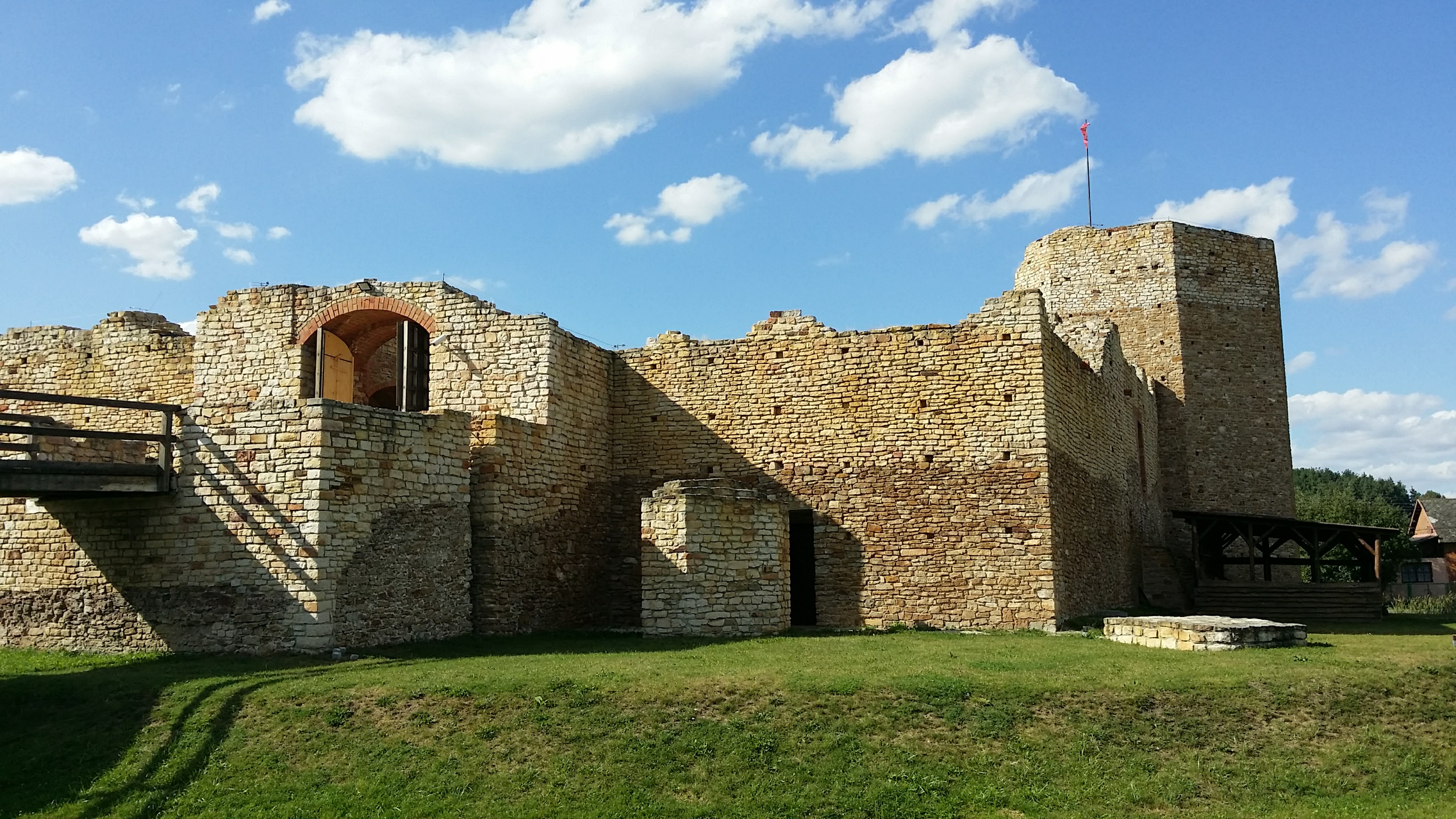
Inowłódz Castle

- Inowrocław – Kuyavian-Pomeranian Voivodeship

== J ==
- Janowiec Castle – Lublin Voivodeship
- Janowiec Castle in Janowiec, Żagań County, Lubusz Voivodeship (ruins)
- Jasna Góra – Silesian Voivodeship
- Jawor Castle – Lower Silesian Voivodeship
- Jelcz-Laskowice – Lower Silesian Voivodeship (ruins)
- Jurów – Lublin Voivodeship

== K ==
- Kapitanowo Castle in Ścinawka Średnia – Lower Silesian Voivodeship
- Karpień Castle – Lower Silesian Voivodeship (ruins)

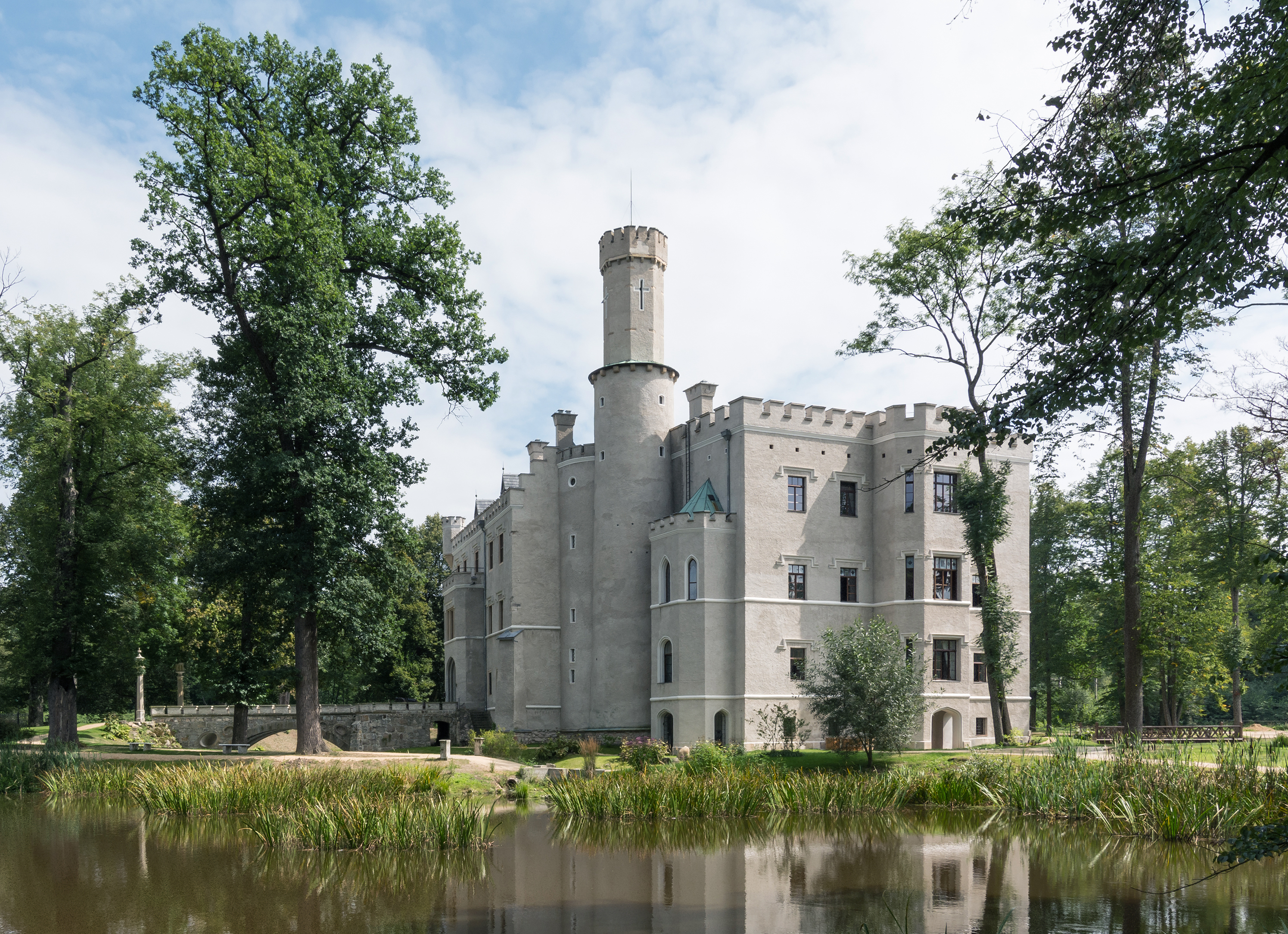
Karpniki Castle

- Karpniki – Lower Silesian Voivodeship
- Kazimierz Dolny Castle – Lublin Voivodeship
- Kąty Wrocławskie – Lower Silesian Voivodeship
- Kędzierzyn-Koźle Castle – Opole Voivodeship
- Kętrzyn Castle in Kętrzyn – Warmian-Masurian Voivodeship
- Kliczków Castle in Kliczków – Lower Silesian Voivodeship
- Kliczków Mały – Łódź Voivodeship
- Kłaczyna – Lower Silesian Voivodeship (ruins)
- Kowalewo Pomorskie – Kuyavian-Pomeranian Voivodeship (ruins)
- Koło Castle in Koło – Greater Poland Voivodeship
- Konary Castle – Świętokrzyskie Voivodeship (ruins)
- Korfantów Castle – Opole Voivodeship
- Korzkiew Castle – Lesser Poland Voivodeship
- Kostrzyn nad Odrą – Lubusz Voivodeship (ruins)
- Koziegłowy – Silesian Voivodeship
- Kożuchów – Lubusz Voivodeship
- Koźmin Wielkopolski – Greater Poland Voivodeship

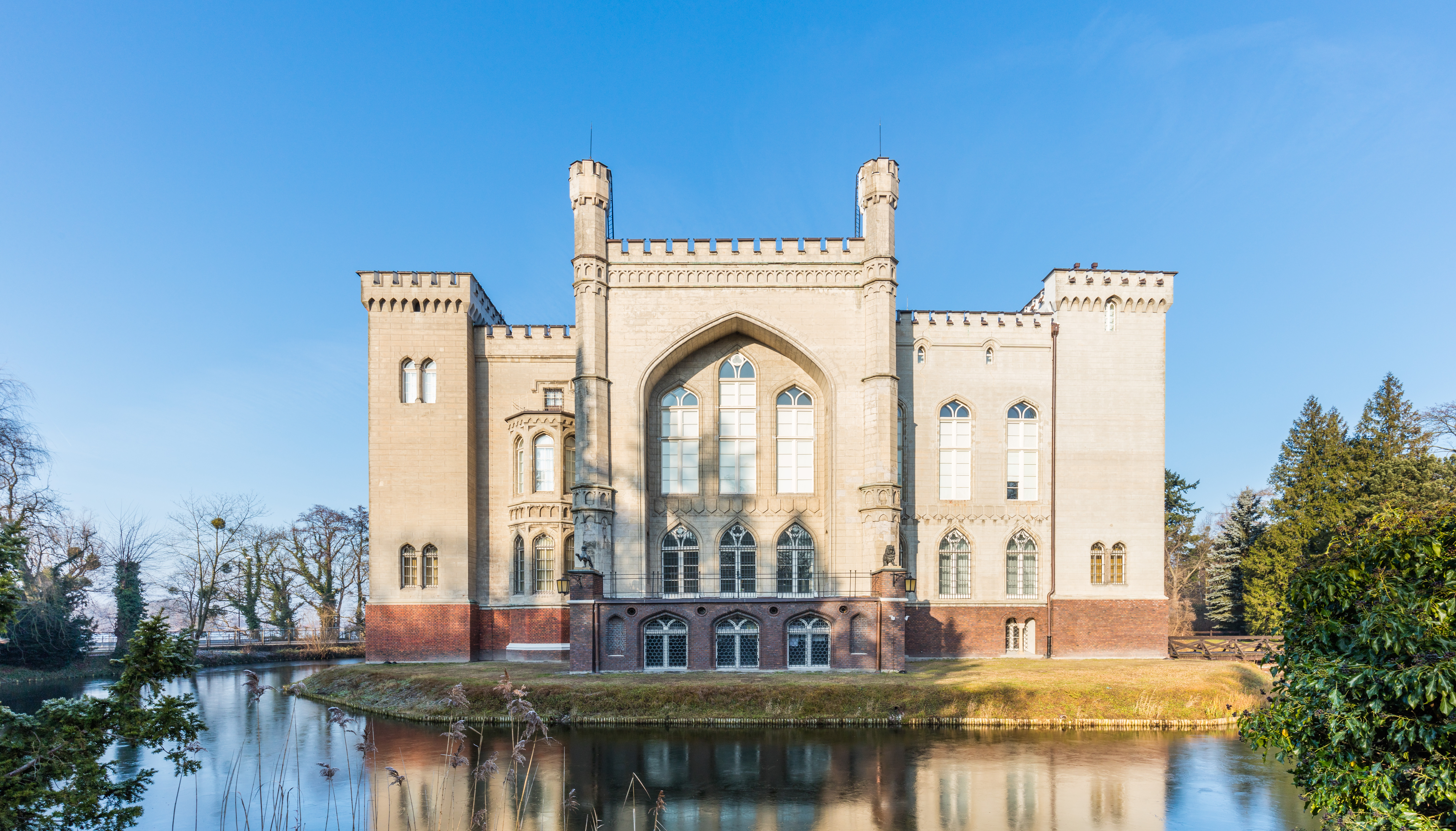
Kórnik Castle

- Kórnik Castle in Kórnik, Greater Poland Voivodeship
- Krapkowice Castle – Opole Voivodeship
- Krasiczyn Castle – Subcarpathian Voivodeship

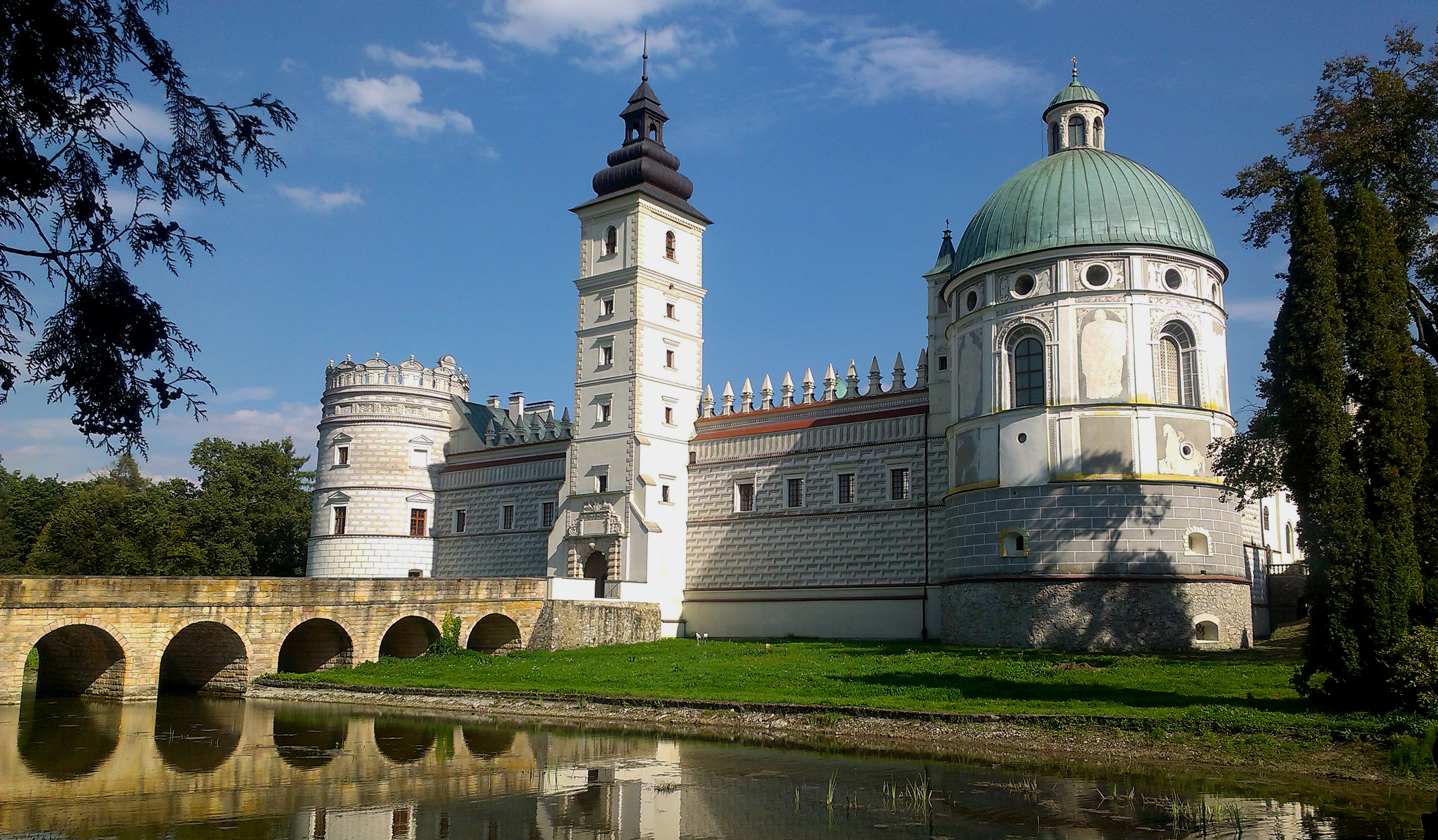
Krasiczyn Castle

- Krasnystaw – Lublin Voivodeship
- Krąg – West Pomeranian Voivodeship
- Krobielowice – Lower Silesian Voivodeship

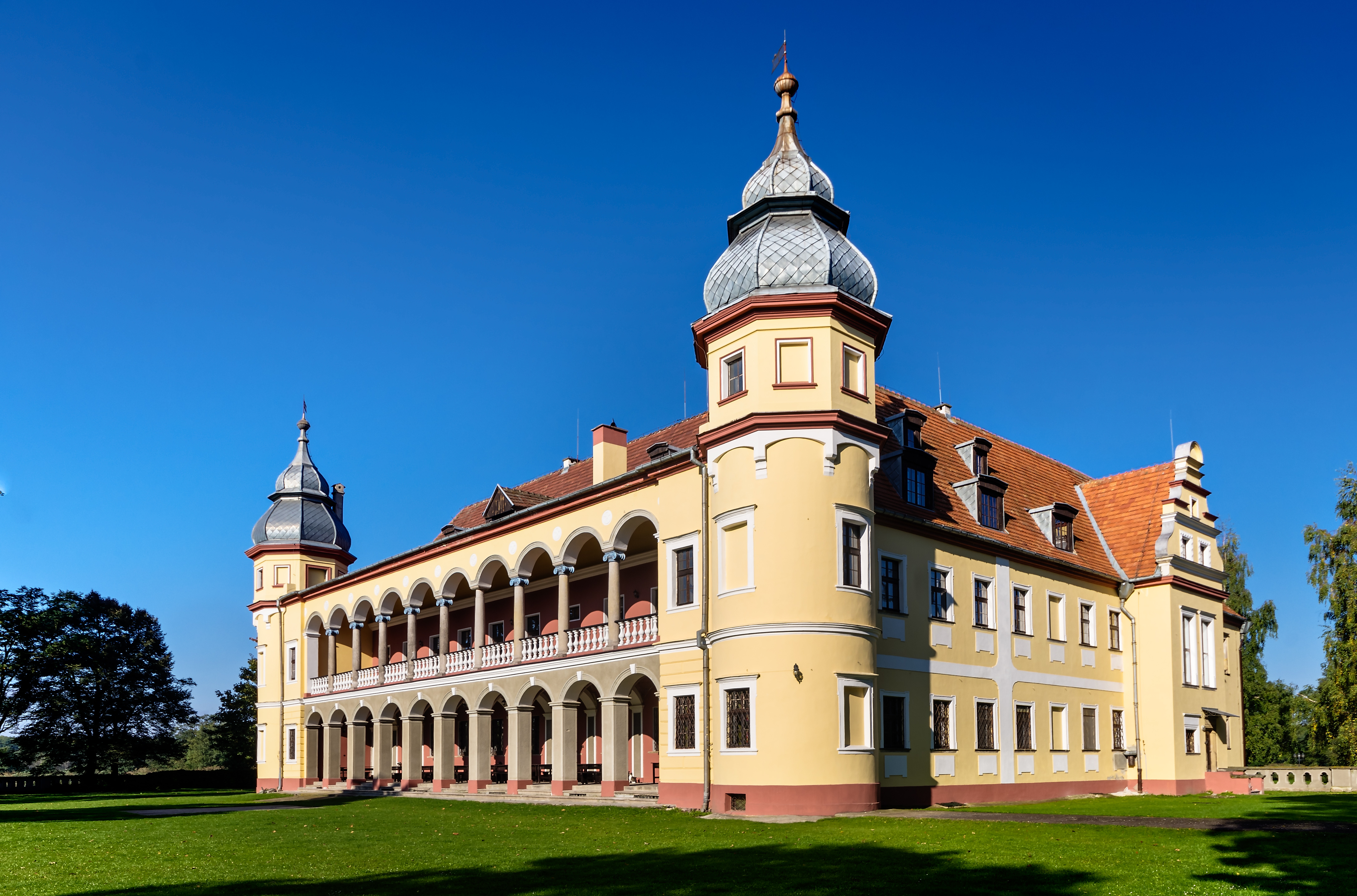
Krobielowice Castle

- Krosno Odrzańskie – Lower Silesian Voivodeship
- Krupe Castle – Lublin Voivodeship
- Kryłów – Lublin Voivodeship (ruins)
- Kruszwica – Kuyavian-Pomeranian Voivodeship
- Krzyżtopór in Ujazd, Świętokrzyskie Voivodeship
- Książ Castle in Wałbrzych, Lower Silesian Voivodeship

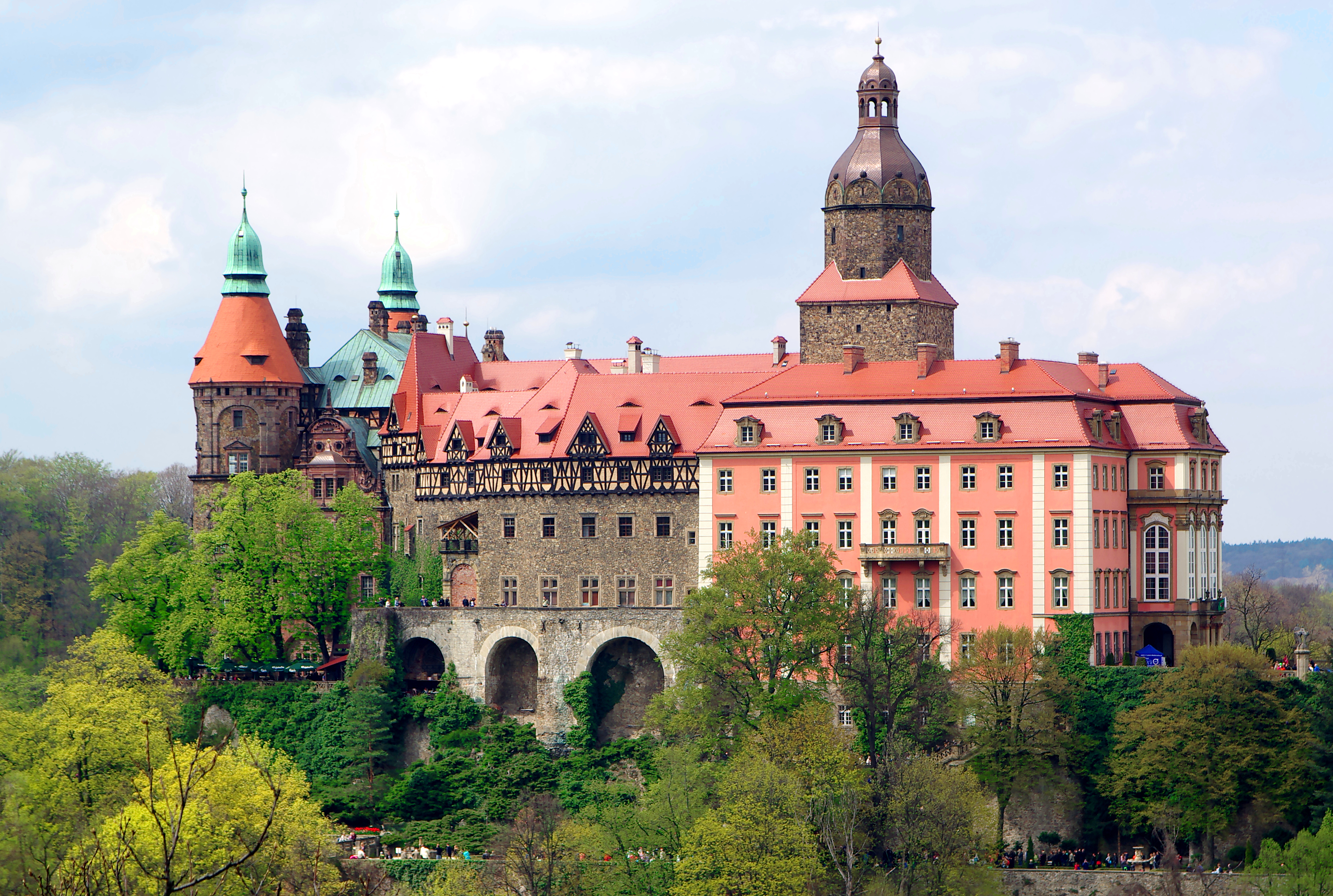
Książ Castle in Wałbrzych

- Kunowa – Subcarpathian Voivodeship
- Kurzętnik – Warmian-Masurian Voivodeship (ruins)
- Kwidzyn Castle – Pomeranian Voivodeship

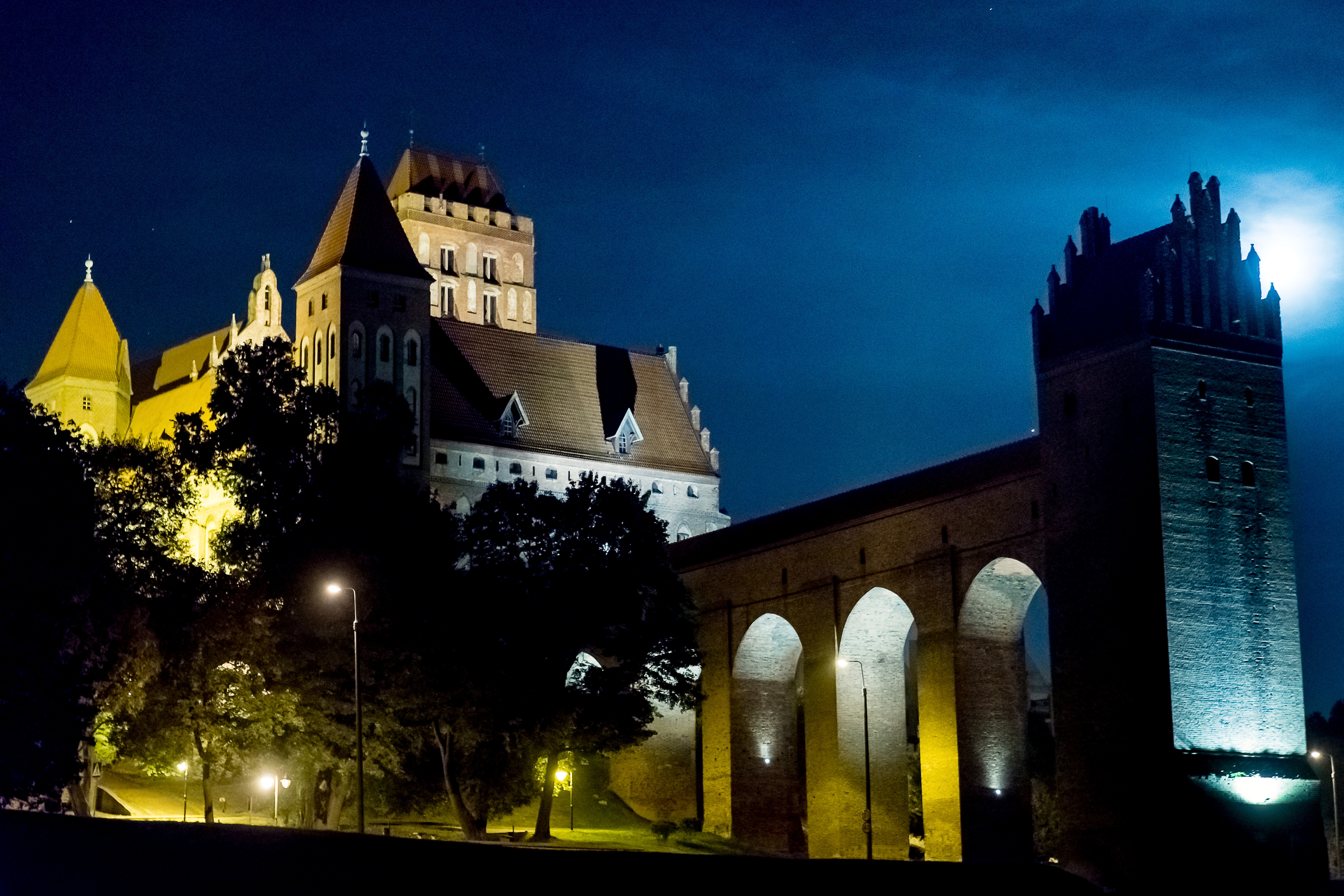
Kwidzyn Castle

== L ==
- Lanckorona Castle in Lanckorona – Lesser Poland Voivodeship (ruins)
- Legnica Castle – Lower Silesian Voivodeship

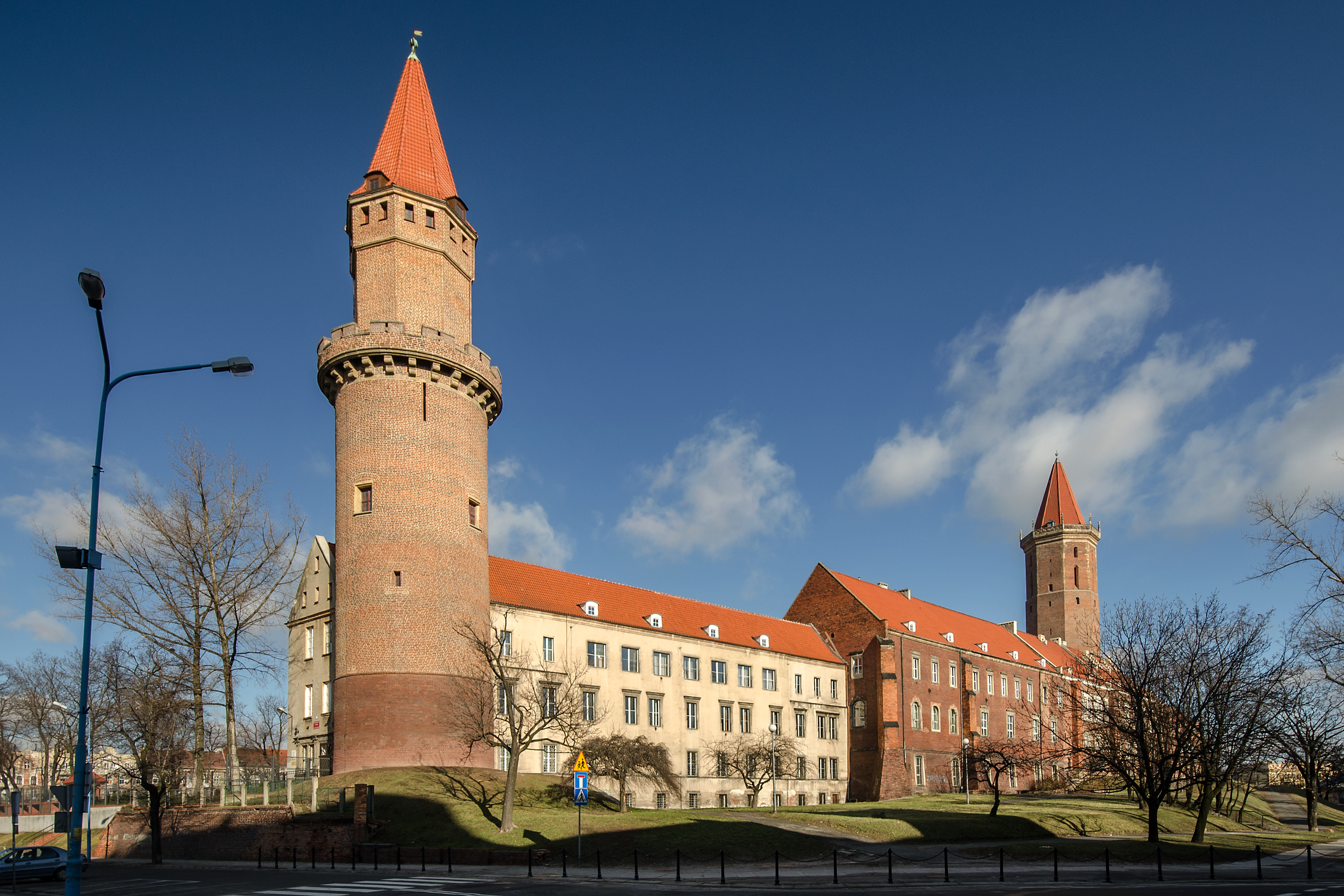
Piast Castle in Legnica

- Lesko – Subcarpathian Voivodeship
- Leśna Castle in Szczytna – Lower Silesian Voivodeship
- Lidzbark Castle in Lidzbark Warmiński, Warmian-Masurian Voivodeship

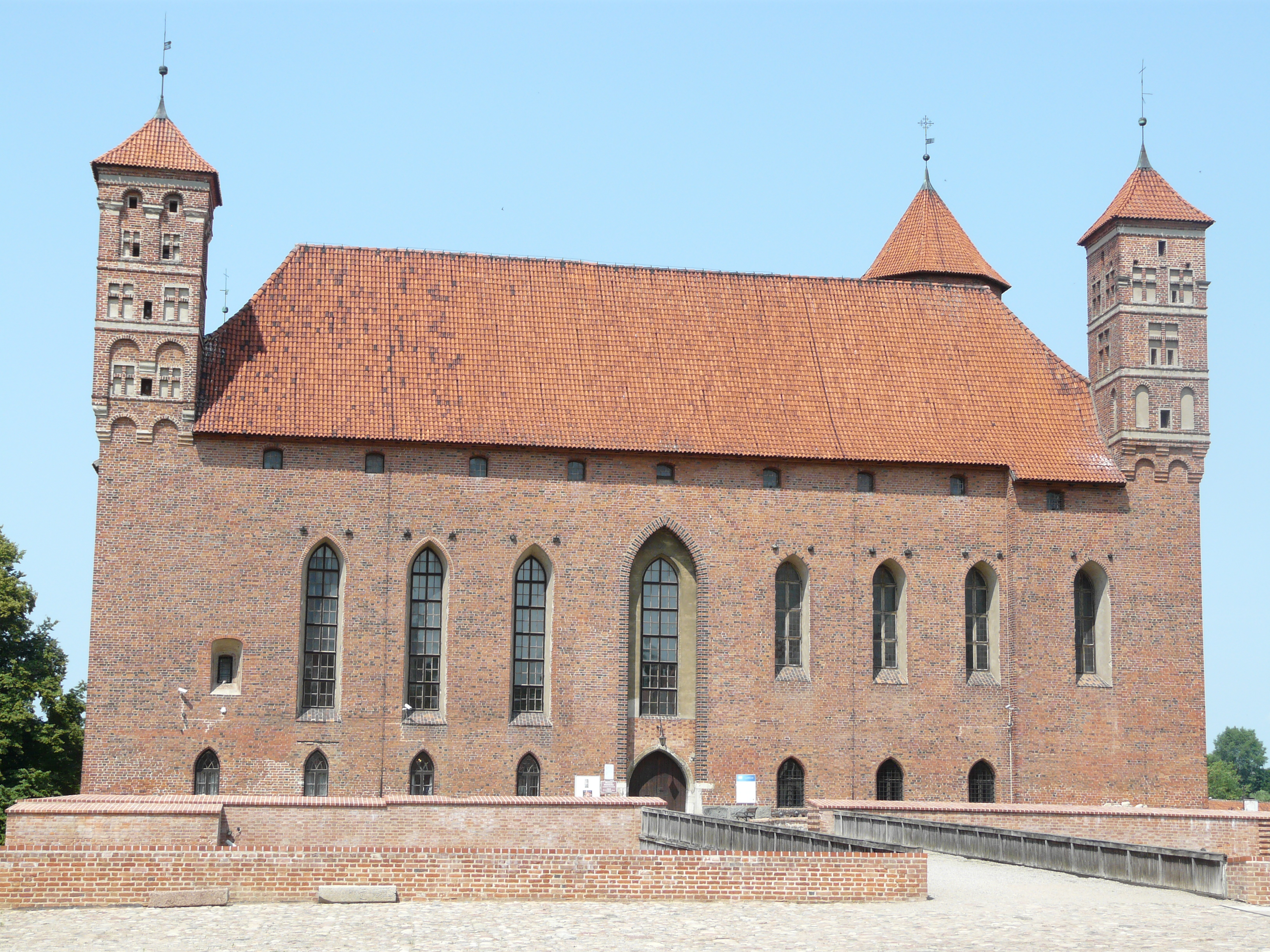
Lidzbark Castle

- Lipienek – Kuyavian-Pomeranian Voivodeship (ruins)
- Lipowiec Castle in Babice, Lesser Poland Voivodeship
- Lisów – Subcarpathian Voivodeship
- Liw Castle – Mazovian Voivodeship
- Lubartów – Lublin Voivodeship
- Lubawa Castle in Lubawa, Warmian-Masurian Voivodeship

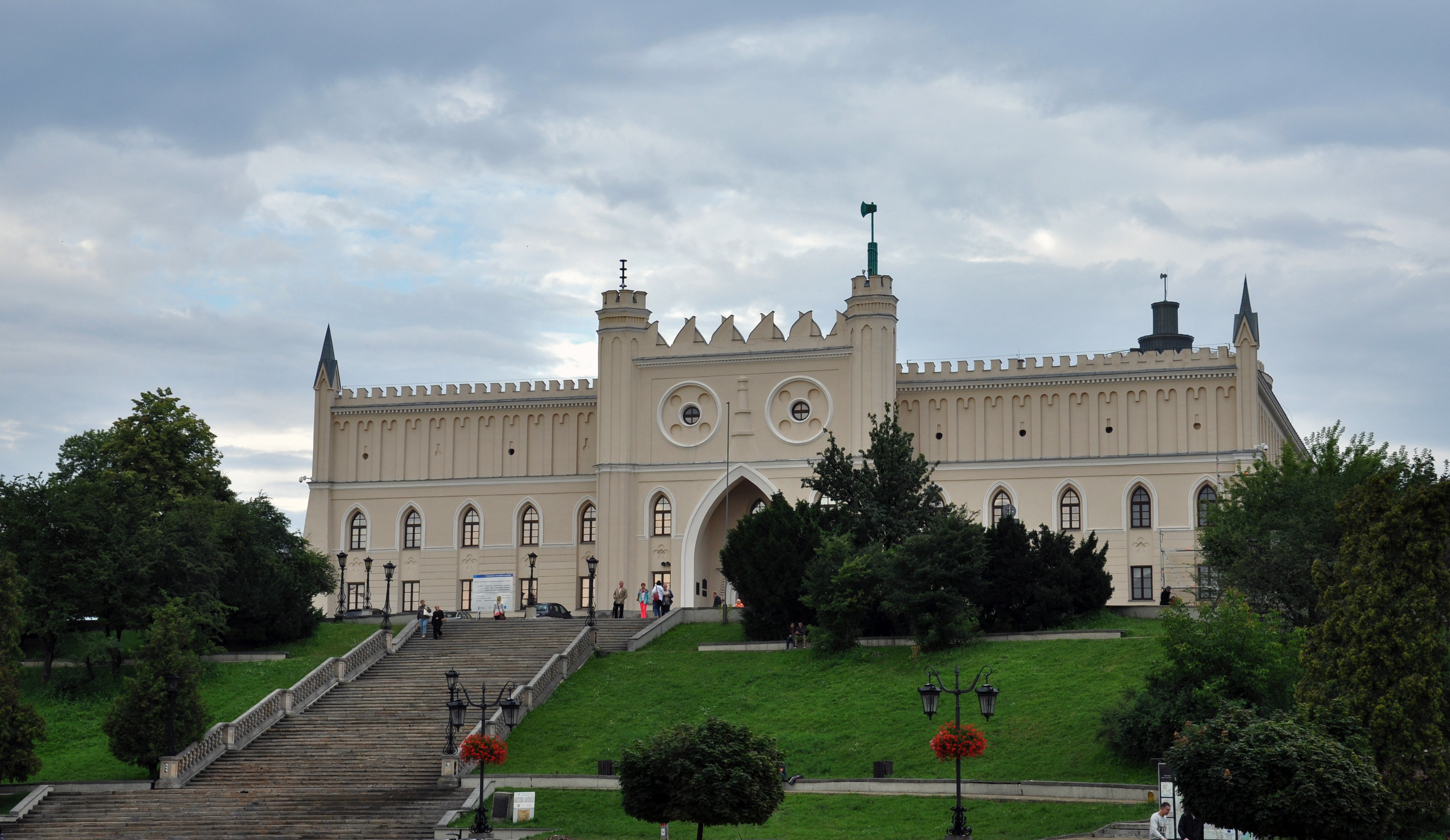
Lublin Castle

- Lubin – Lower Silesian Voivodeship
- Lublin Castle – Lublin Voivodeship
- Lubsko – Lubusz Voivodeship

== Ł ==
- Łagów Castle, Łagów – Lubusz Voivodeship
- Łapalice – Pomeranian Voivodeship

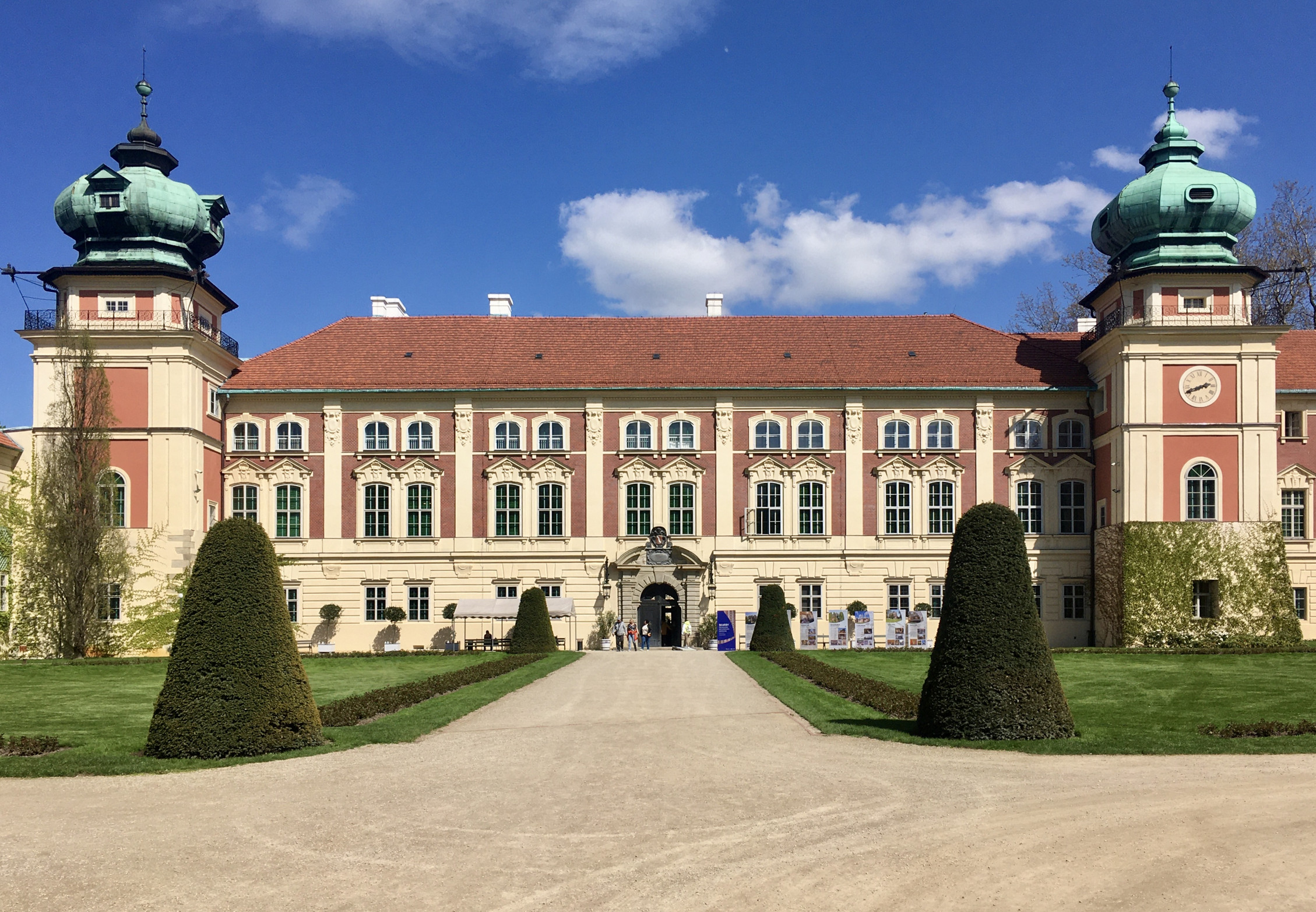
Łańcut Castle

- Łańcut Castle, Łańcut – Subcarpathian Voivodeship
- Łąka Prudnicka Castle – Opole Voivodeship
- Łęczyca Castle, Łęczyca – Łódź Voivodeship
- Łodygowice – Silesian Voivodeship
- Łownica – Świętokrzyskie Voivodeship

== M ==
- Machliny – West Pomeranian Voivodeship
- Malbork Castle – Pomeranian Voivodeship
- Malec – Lesser Poland Voivodeship
- Maleszowa – Świętokrzyskie Voivodeship
- Melsztyn – Lesser Poland Voivodeship
- Międzygórz – Holy Cross Voivodeship (ruins)
- Międzyrzecz Castle in Międzyrzecz, Lubusz Voivodeship
- Mirów – Silesian Voivodeship
- Modliszewice – Świętokrzyskie Voivodeship
- Moszna Castle – Opole Voivodeship
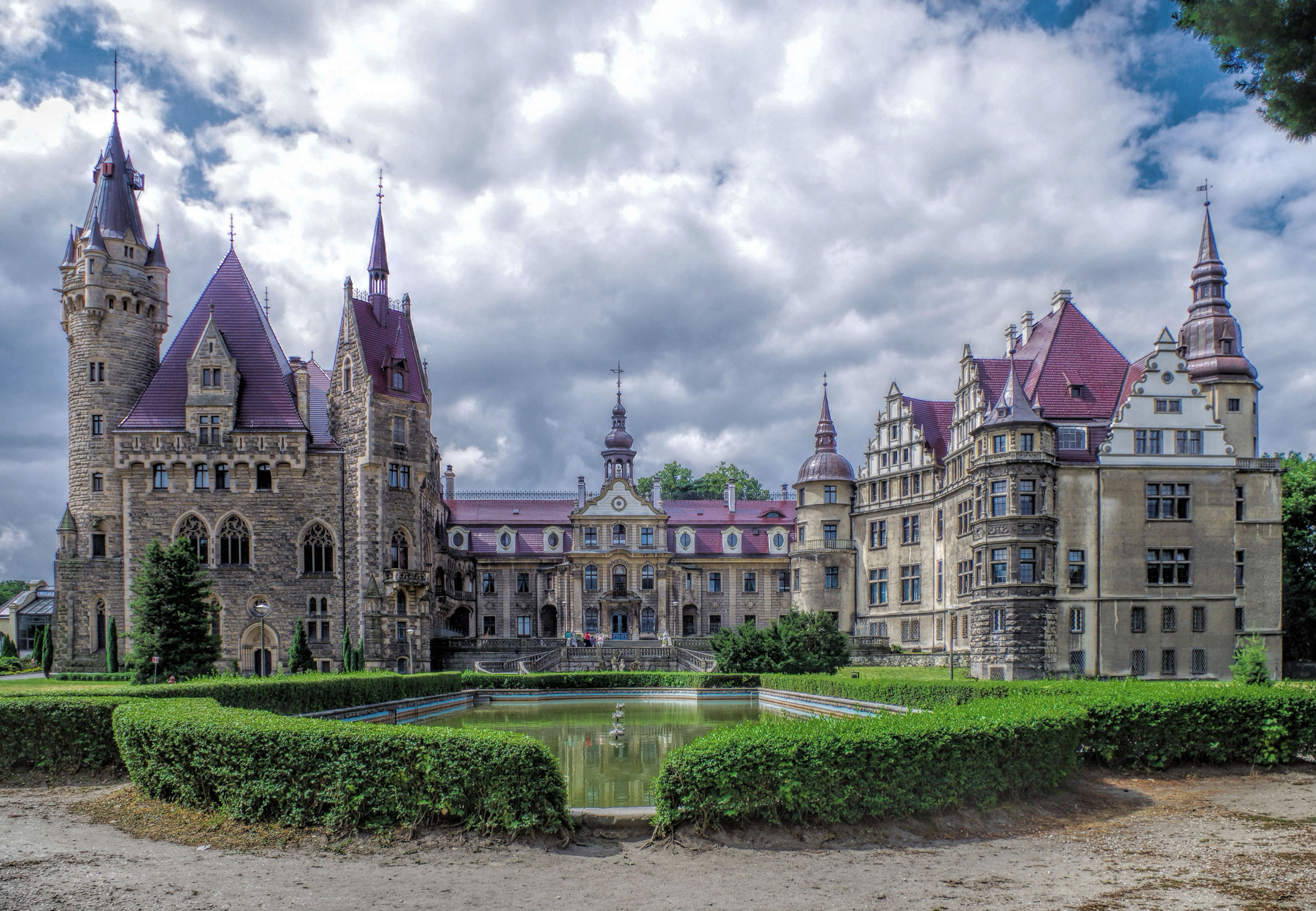
  Moszna Castle
- Muszyna – Lesser Poland Voivodeship
- Myślenice – Lesser Poland Voivodeship (ruins)

== N ==
- Namysłów Castle in Namysłów – Opole Voivodeship
- Nidzica Castle in Nidzica – Warmian-Masurian Voivodeship
- Niedzica Castle in Niedzica – Lesser Poland Voivodeship

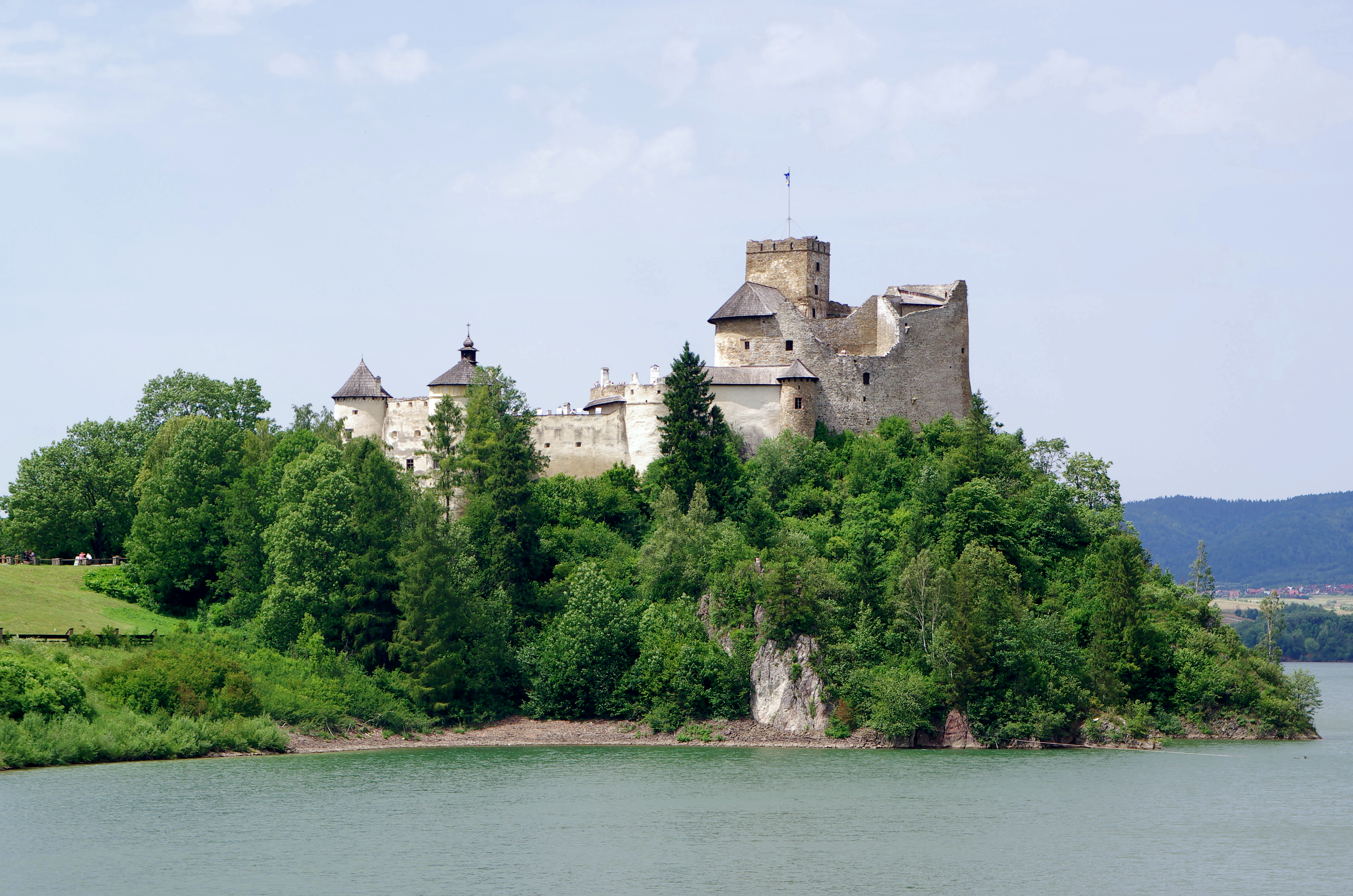
Niedzica Castle

- Niemcza – Lower Silesian Voivodeship
- Niemodlin – Opole Voivodeship
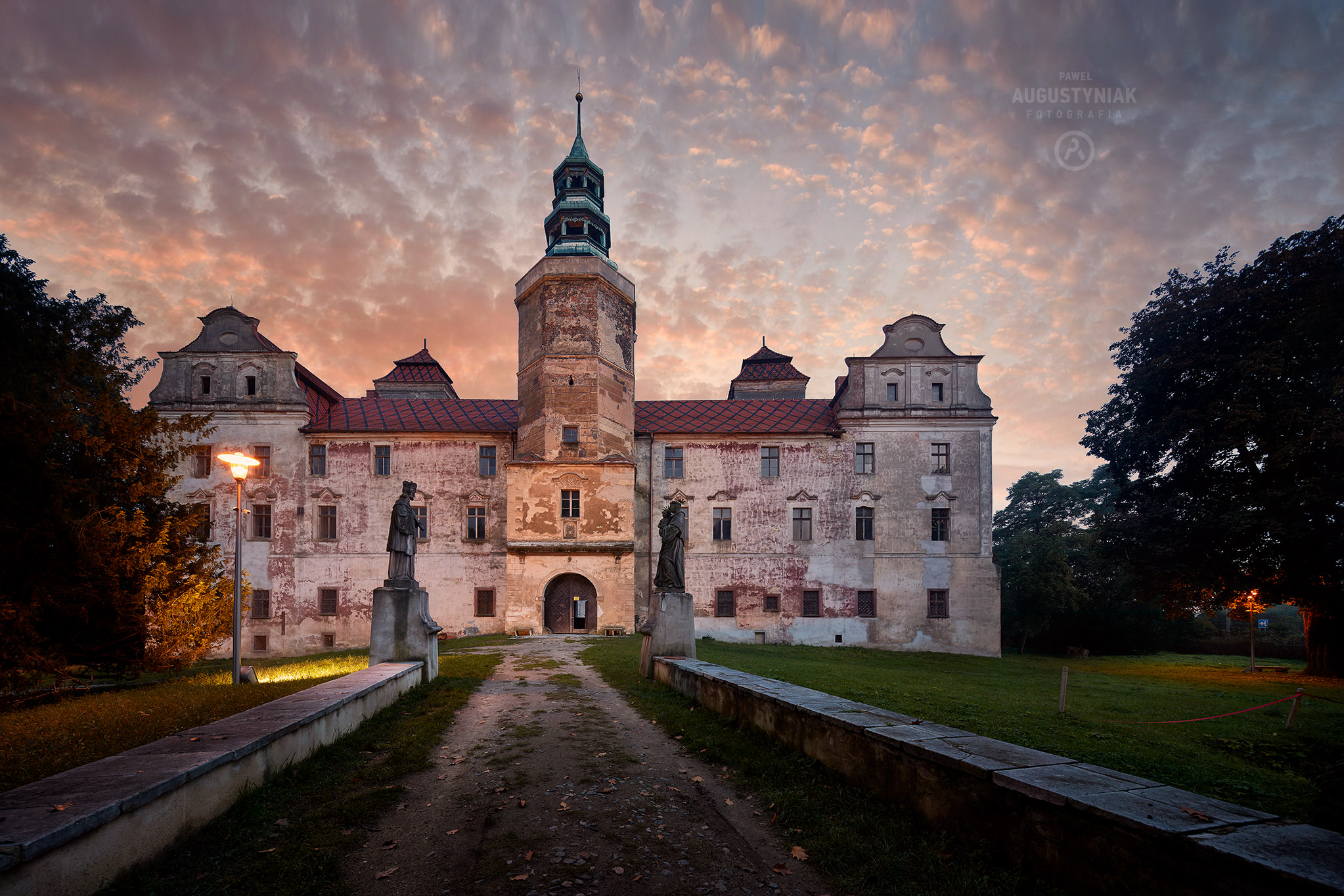
  Niemodlin Castle
- Niepołomice Castle in Niepołomice – Lesser Poland Voivodeship
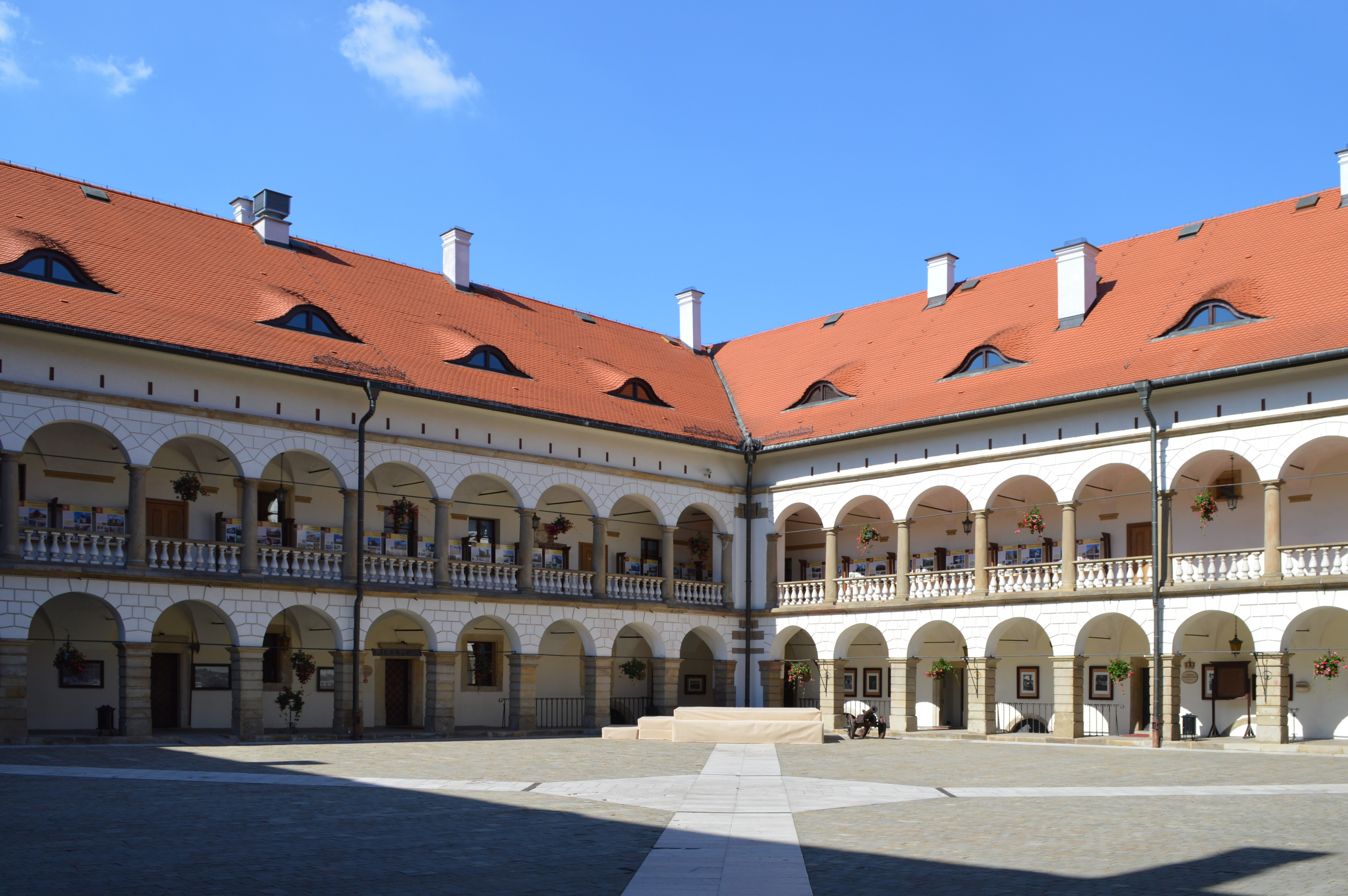
  Niepołomice Castle
- Niesytno Castle in Płonina, Lower Silesian Voivodeship (ruins)
- Nowe Castle – Kuyavian-Pomeranian Voivodeship
- Nowy Jasiniec – Kuyavian-Pomeranian Voivodeship (ruins)
- Nowy Korczyn – Holy Cross Voivodeship
- Nowy Sącz – Lesser Poland Voivodeship
- Nowy Wiśnicz – Lesser Poland Voivodeship
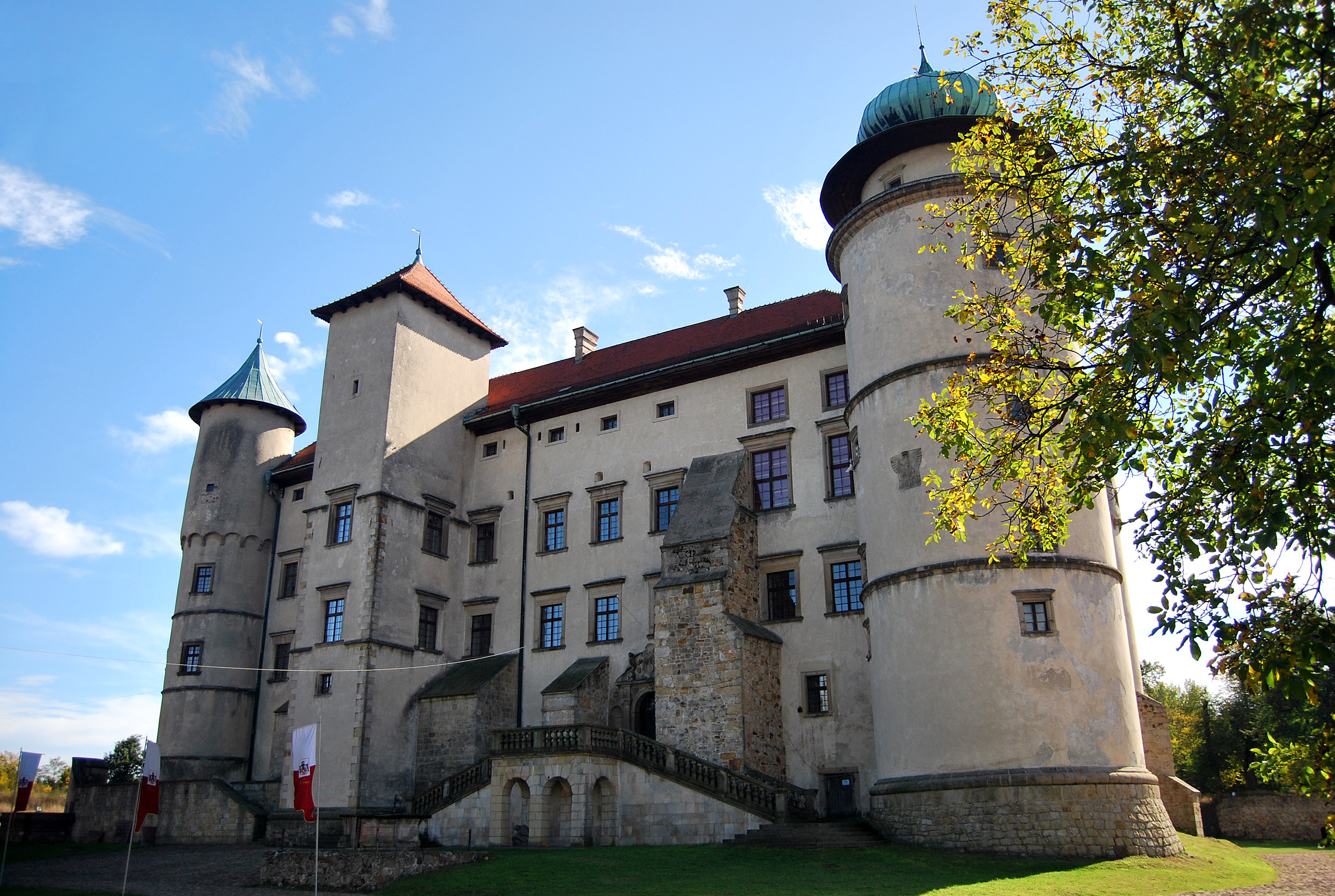
  Nowy Wiśnicz Castle
- Nysa Castle – Opole Voivodeship

== O ==
- Odrzykoń – Subcarpathian Voivodeship
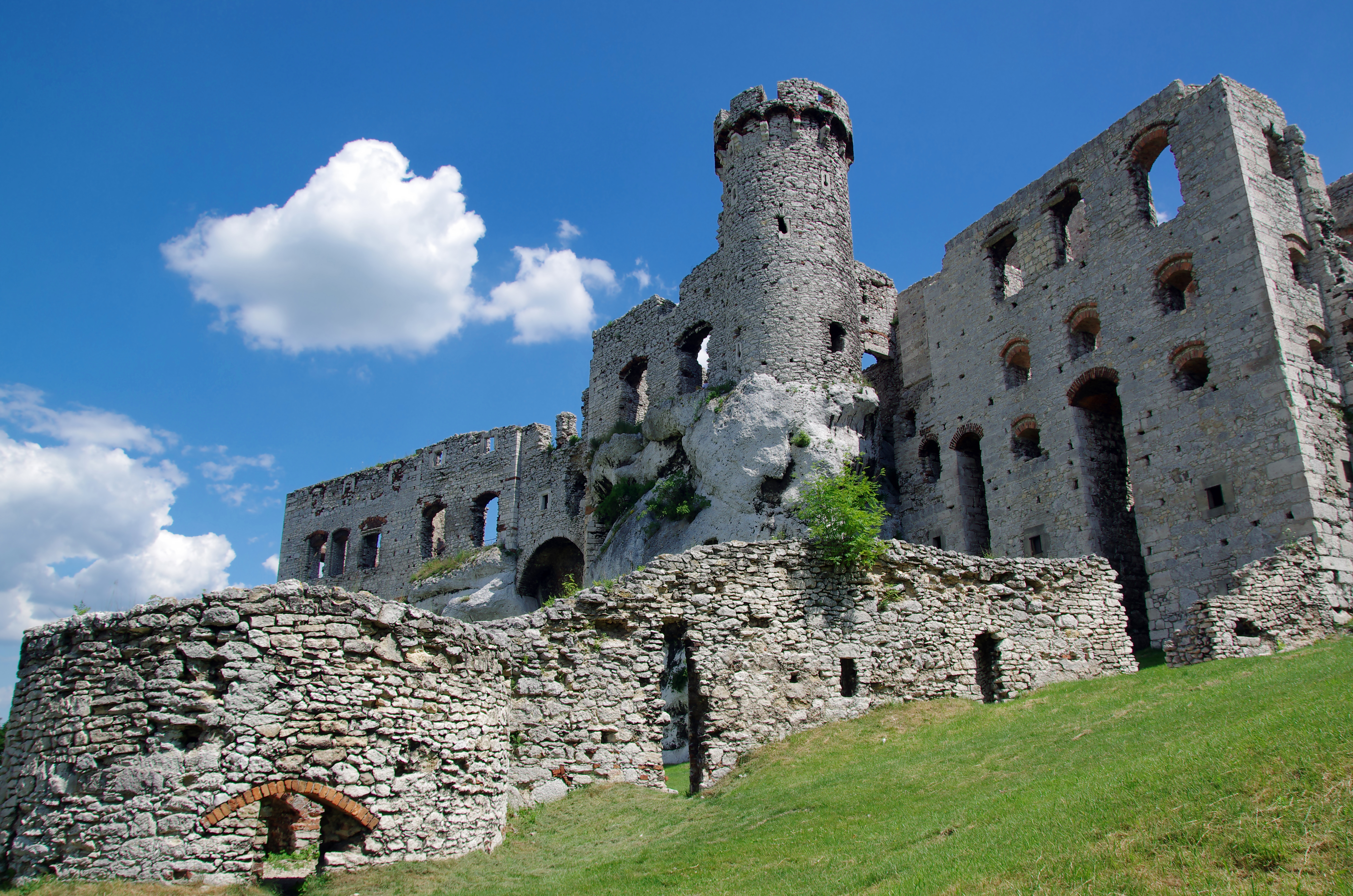
  Ogrodzieniec Castle
- Ogrodzieniec Castle – Silesian Voivodeship
- Okartowo – Warmian-Masurian Voivodeship
- Ojców Castle – Lesser Poland Voivodeship
- Oleszyce – Subcarpathian Voivodeship
- Oleśnica Castle – Lower Silesian Voivodeship
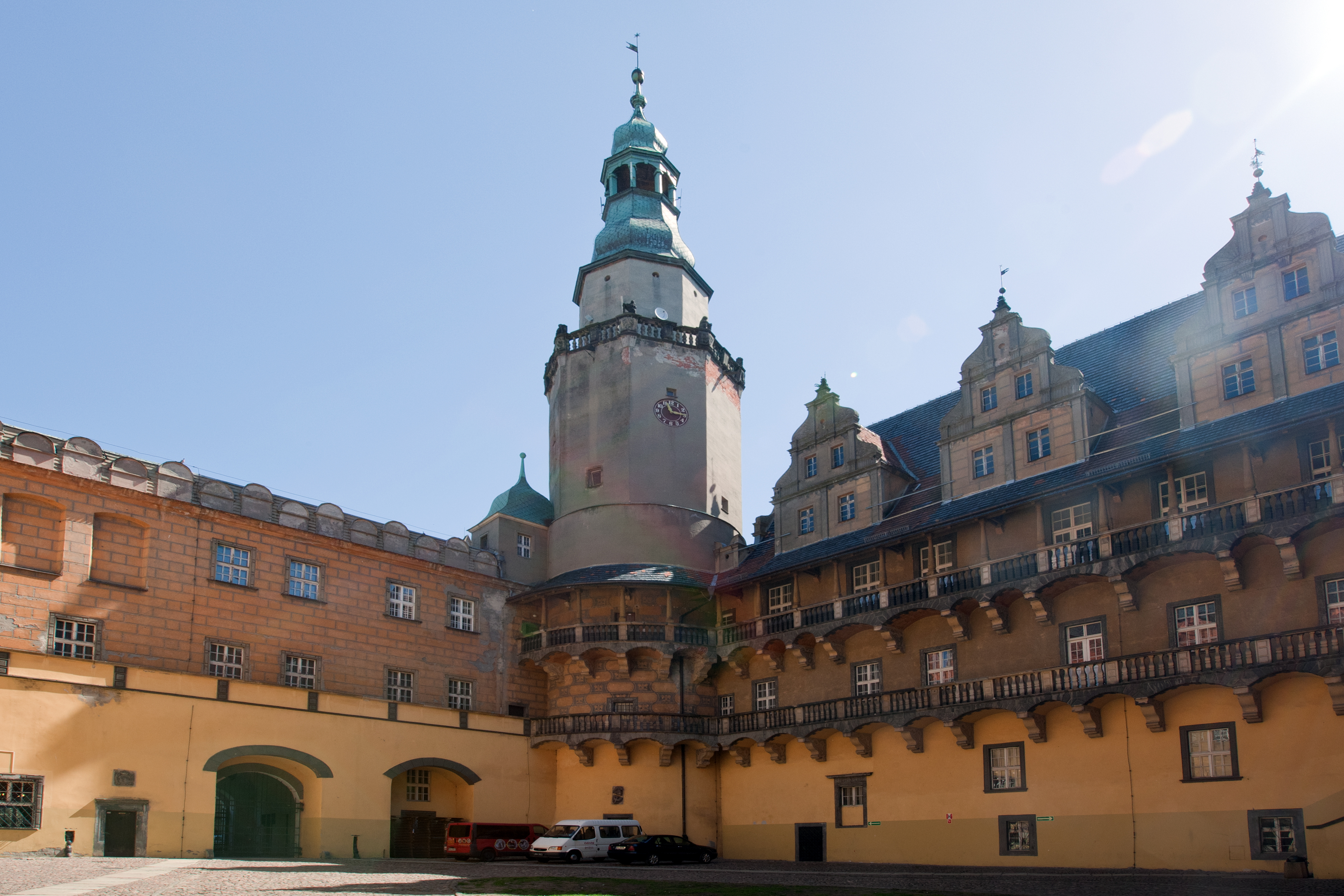
  Oleśnica Castle
- Olszanica – Subcarpathian Voivodeship
- Olsztyn Castle in Olsztyn, Warmian-Masurian Voivodeship
- Olsztyn Castle in Olsztyn, Silesian Voivodeship
- Olsztynek Castle in Olsztynek, Warmian-Masurian Voivodeship
- Oława Castle – Lower Silesian Voivodeship
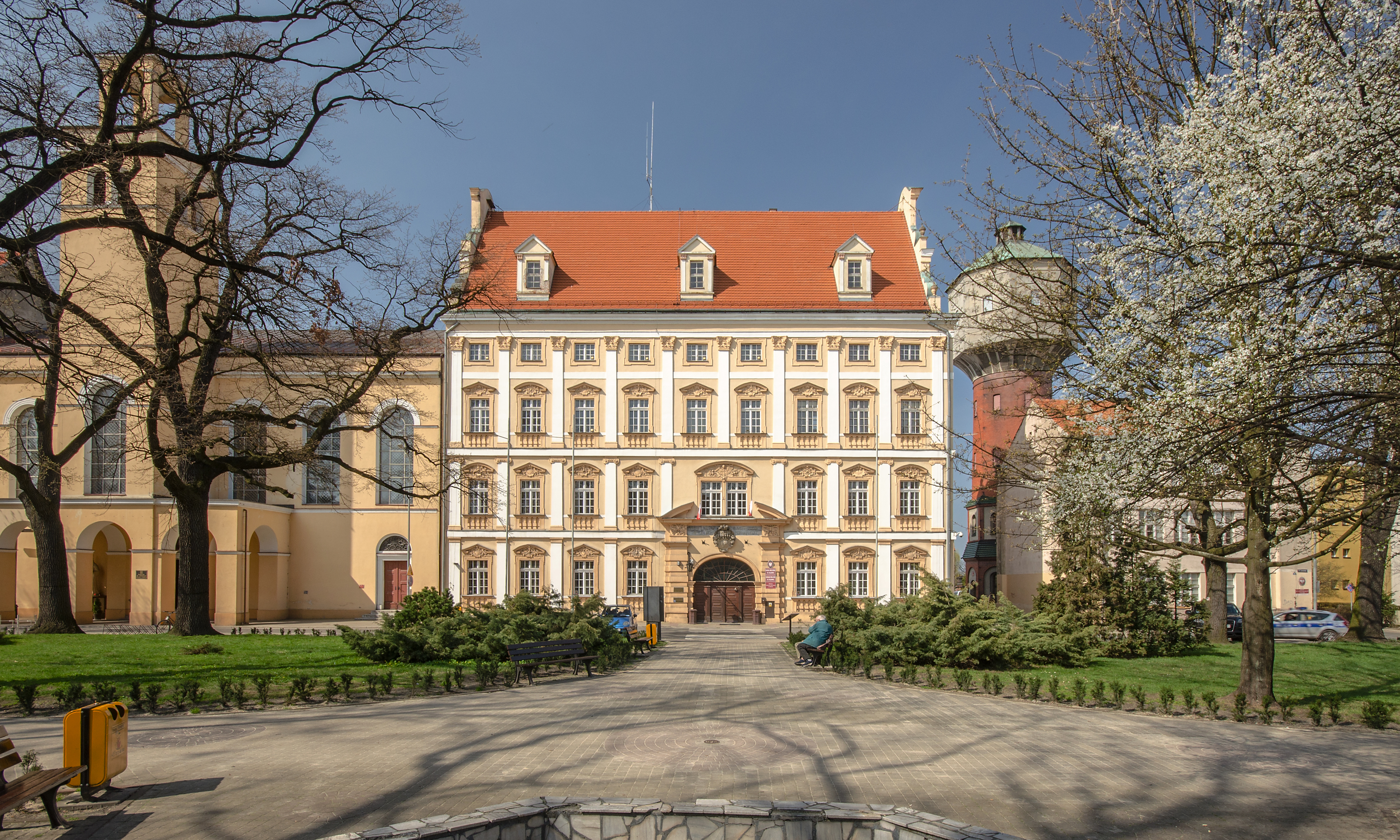
  Oława Castle
- Opoczno – Łódź Voivodeship
- Opole – Opole Voivodeship (only tower preserved)
- Opole Lubelskie – Lublin Voivodeship
- Oporów Castle – Łódź Voivodeship
- Orneta – Warmian-Masurian Voivodeship
- Osiek – Świętokrzyskie Voivodeship
- Ossolin – Świętokrzyskie Voivodeship (ruins)
- Ostroróg Castle in Ostroróg, Greater Poland Voivodeship (ruins)
- Ostróda Castle in Ostróda, Warmian-Masurian Voivodeship
- Ostrężnik – Silesian Voivodeship (ruins)
- Ostrzeszów – Greater Poland Voivodeship (only tower preserved)
- Oświęcim Castle – Lesser Poland Voivodeship
- Otyń – Lubusz Voivodeship
- Otmuchów Castle in Otmuchów – Opole Voivodeship
- Owiesno – Lower Silesian Voivodeship (ruins)

== P ==
- Papowo Biskupie – Kuyavian-Pomeranian Voivodeship (ruins)
- Pasłęk – Warmian-Masurian Voivodeship
- Pęzino Castle in Pęzino – Pomeranian Voivodeship

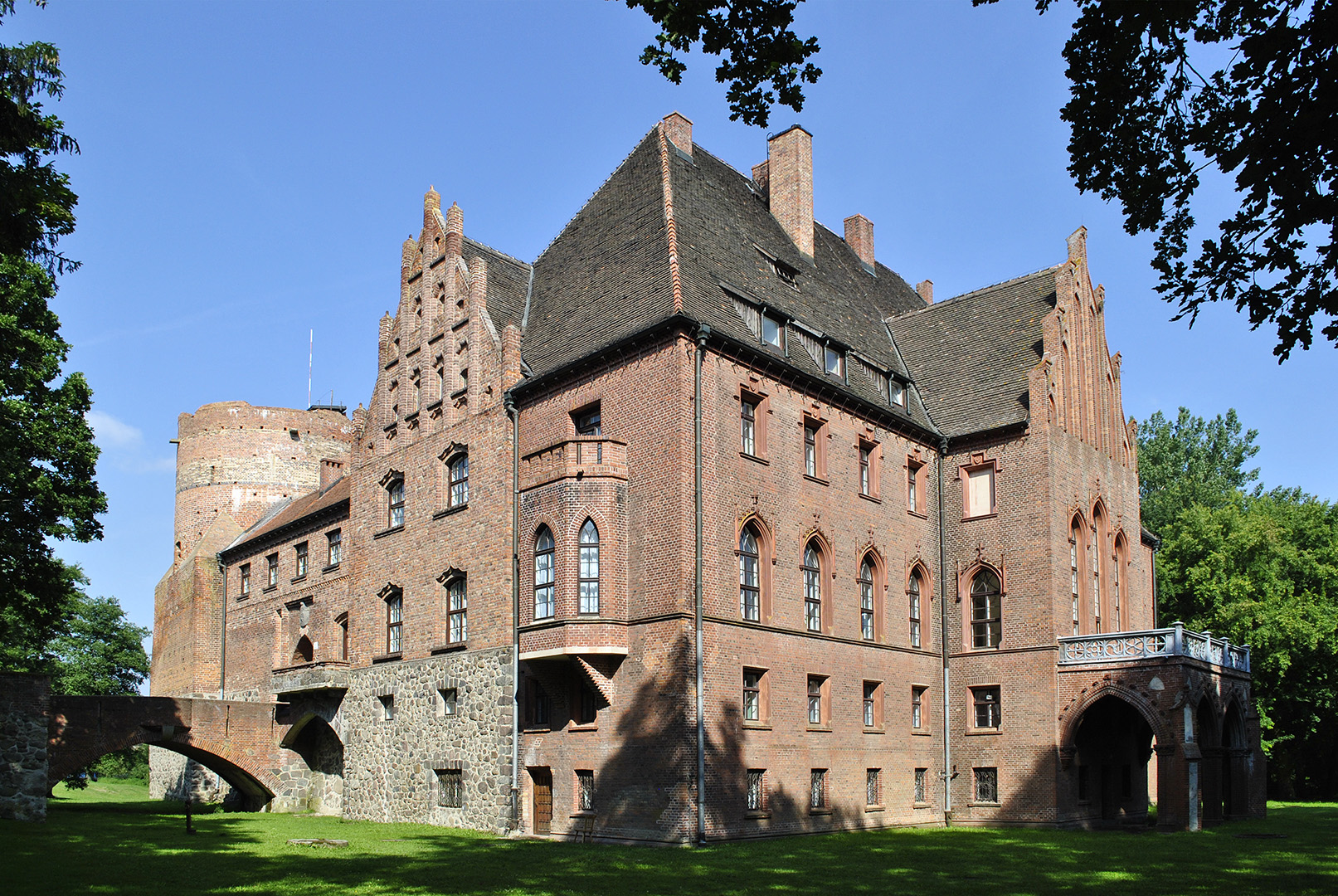
Pęzino Castle

- Pieniężno – Warmian-Masurian Voivodeship
- Pieskowa Skała Castle in Sułoszowa – Lesser Poland Voivodeship

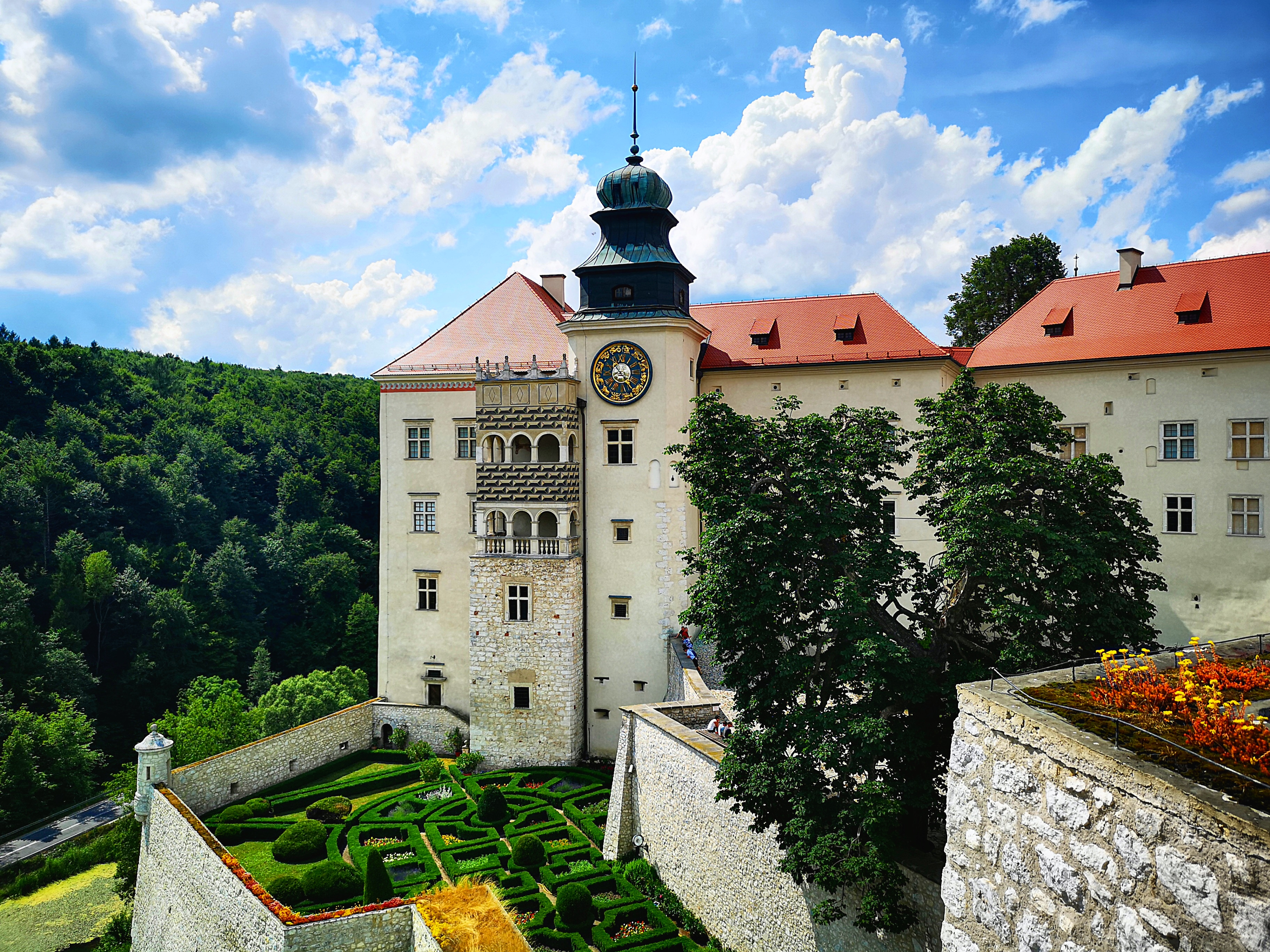
Pieskowa Skała

- Pilica – Silesian Voivodeship
- Pieszyce – Lower Silesian Voivodeship
- Piotrków Trybunalski Castle in Piotrków Trybunalski - Łódź Voivodeship
- Płakowice Castle in Lwówek Śląski – Lower Silesian Voivodeship
- Płock Castle in Płock – Mazovian Voivodeship
- New Castle in Płoty – West Pomeranian Voivodeship
- Old Castle in Płoty – West Pomeranian Voivodeship
- Podskale Castle in Rząsiny – Lower Silesian Voivodeship (ruins)
- Pokrzywno – Kuyavian-Pomeranian Voivodeship (ruins)
- Polska Cerekiew – Opole Voivodeship
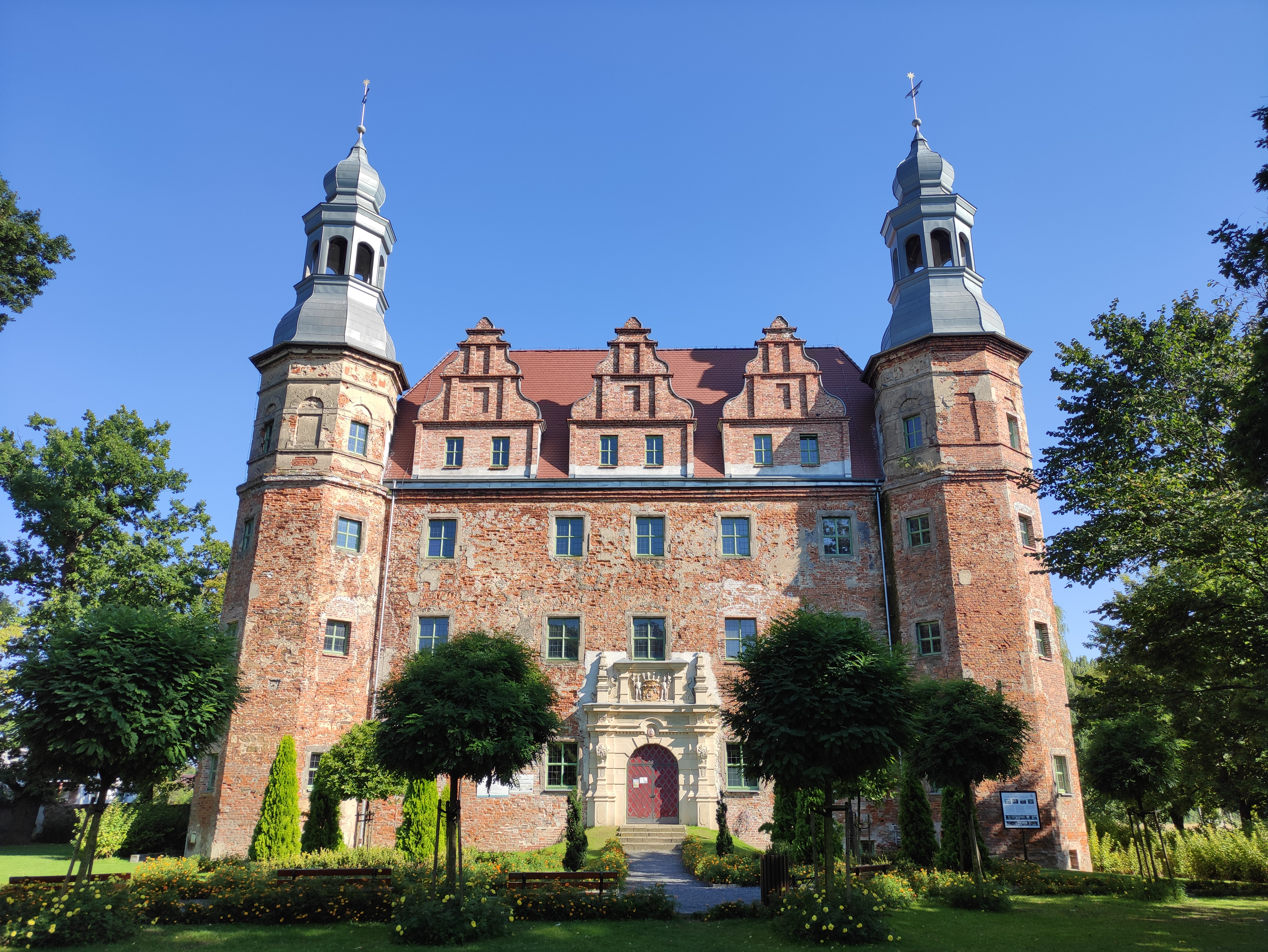
  Polska Cerekiew Castle
- Pomeranian Dukes' Castle in Szczecin
- Poznań – Imperial Castle in Poznań
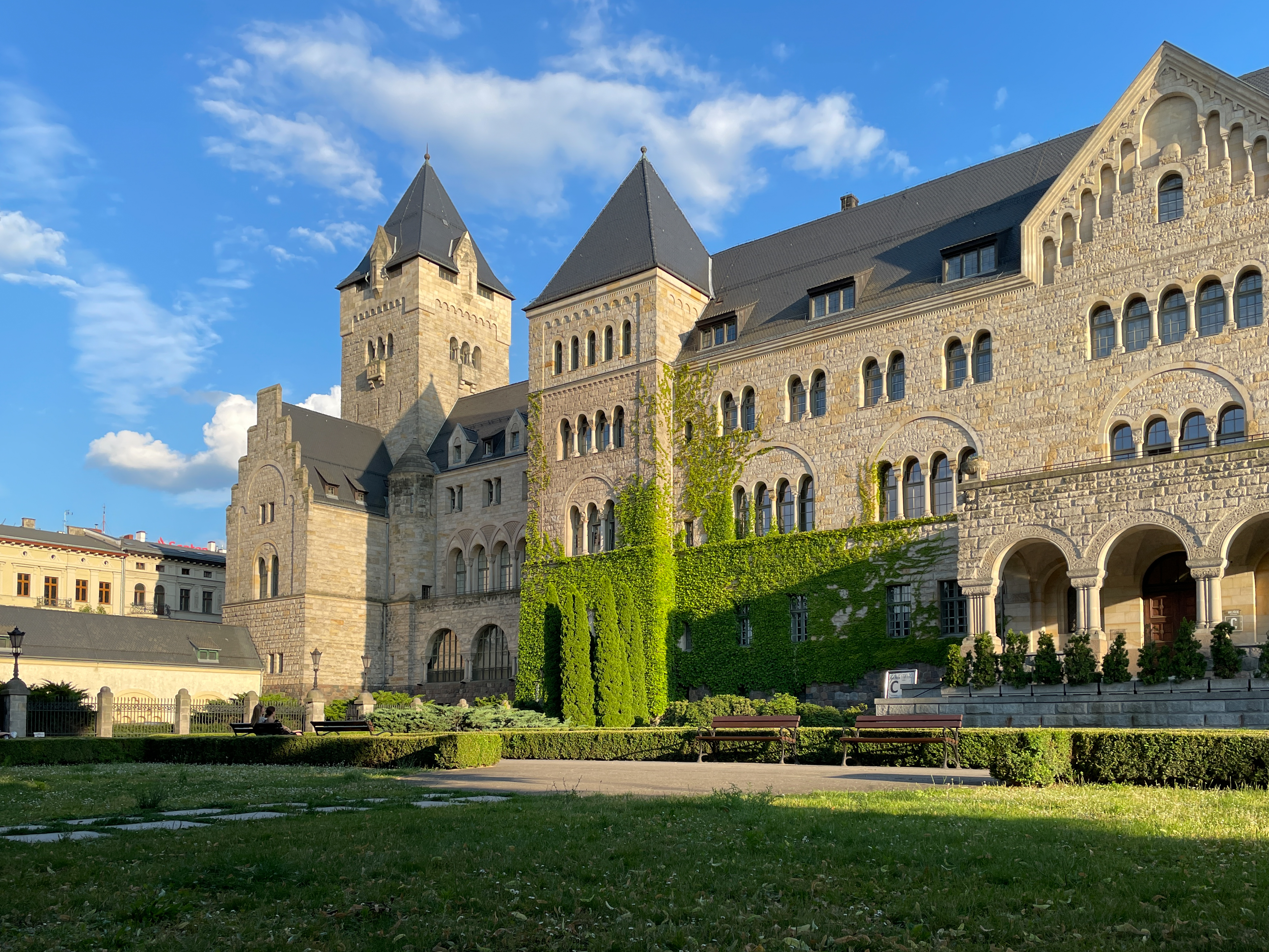
  Poznań Imperial Castle
- Poznań – Royal Castle in Poznań
- Prudnik Castle – Opole Voivodeship
- Przecław – Subcarpathian Voivodeship
- Przegorzały – Lesser Poland Voivodeship
- Przewodziszowice – Silesian Voivodeship
- Przemyśl Castle – Subcarpathian Voivodeship
- Przezmark – Pomeranian Voivodeship
- Przyszów – Subcarpathian Voivodeship
- Pszczyna Castle – Silesian Voivodeship

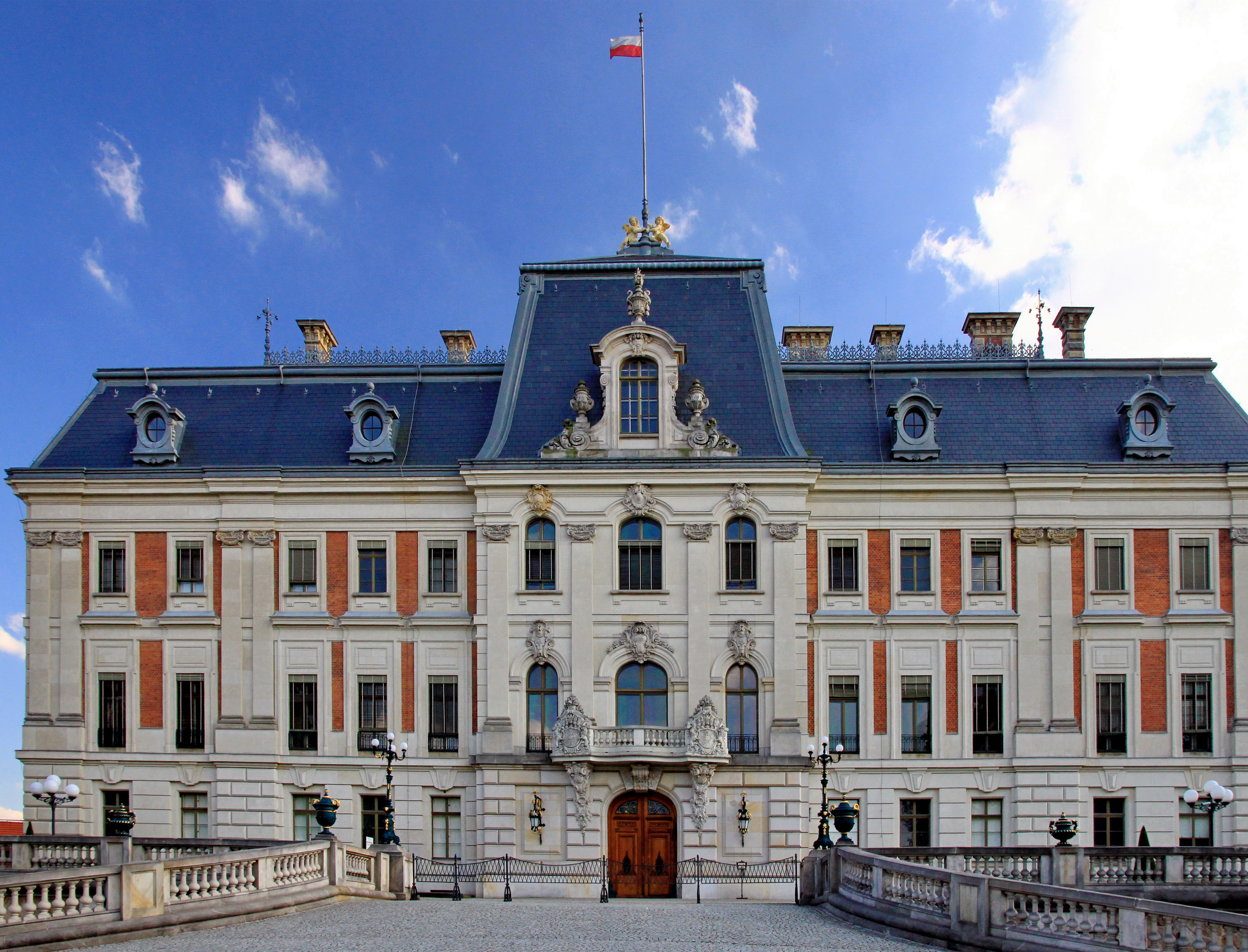
Pszczyna Castle

- Pułtusk – Masovian Voivodeship

== R ==
- Rabsztyn Castle – Lesser Poland Voivodeship
- Raciążek – Kuyavian-Pomeranian Voivodeship (ruins)
- Radków – Lower Silesian Voivodeship
- Radziki Duże – Kuyavian-Pomeranian Voivodeship (ruins)
- Radzyń Chełmiński Castle in Radzyń Chełmiński – Kuyavian-Pomeranian Voivodeship
- Radzyń Podlaski Castle – Lublin Voivodeship
- Ratno Dolne – Lower Silesian Voivodeship
- Rawa Mazowiecka Castle – Łódź Voivodeship
- Recz – West Pomeranian Voivodeship
- Resko – West Pomeranian Voivodeship
- Reszel Castle in Reszel – Warmian-Masurian Voivodeship

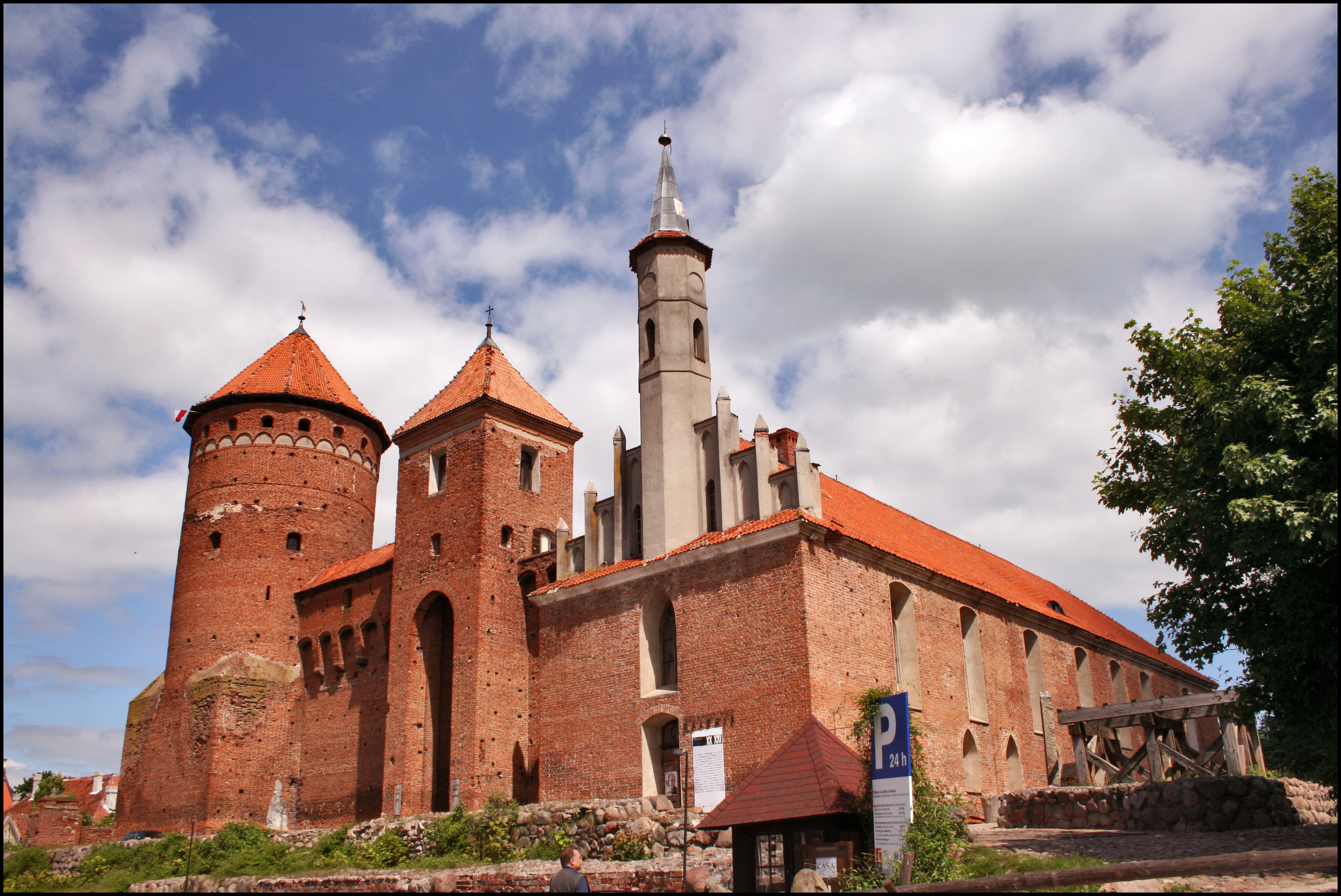
Reszel Castle

- Rembów – Świętokrzyskie Voivodeship
- Rogóźno-Zamek – Kuyavian-Pomeranian Voivodeship
- Rokitnica – Lower Silesian Voivodeship (ruins)
- Rożnów – Lesser Poland Voivodeship
- Rusiec – Łódź Voivodeship
- Rydzyna Castle – Greater Poland Voivodeship
- Rymanów – Subcarpathian Voivodeship
- Ryn Castle – Warmian-Masurian Voivodeship
- Rytro – Lesser Poland Voivodeship
- Rytwiany – Świętokrzyskie Voivodeship
- Rzeszów Castle – Subcarpathian Voivodeship
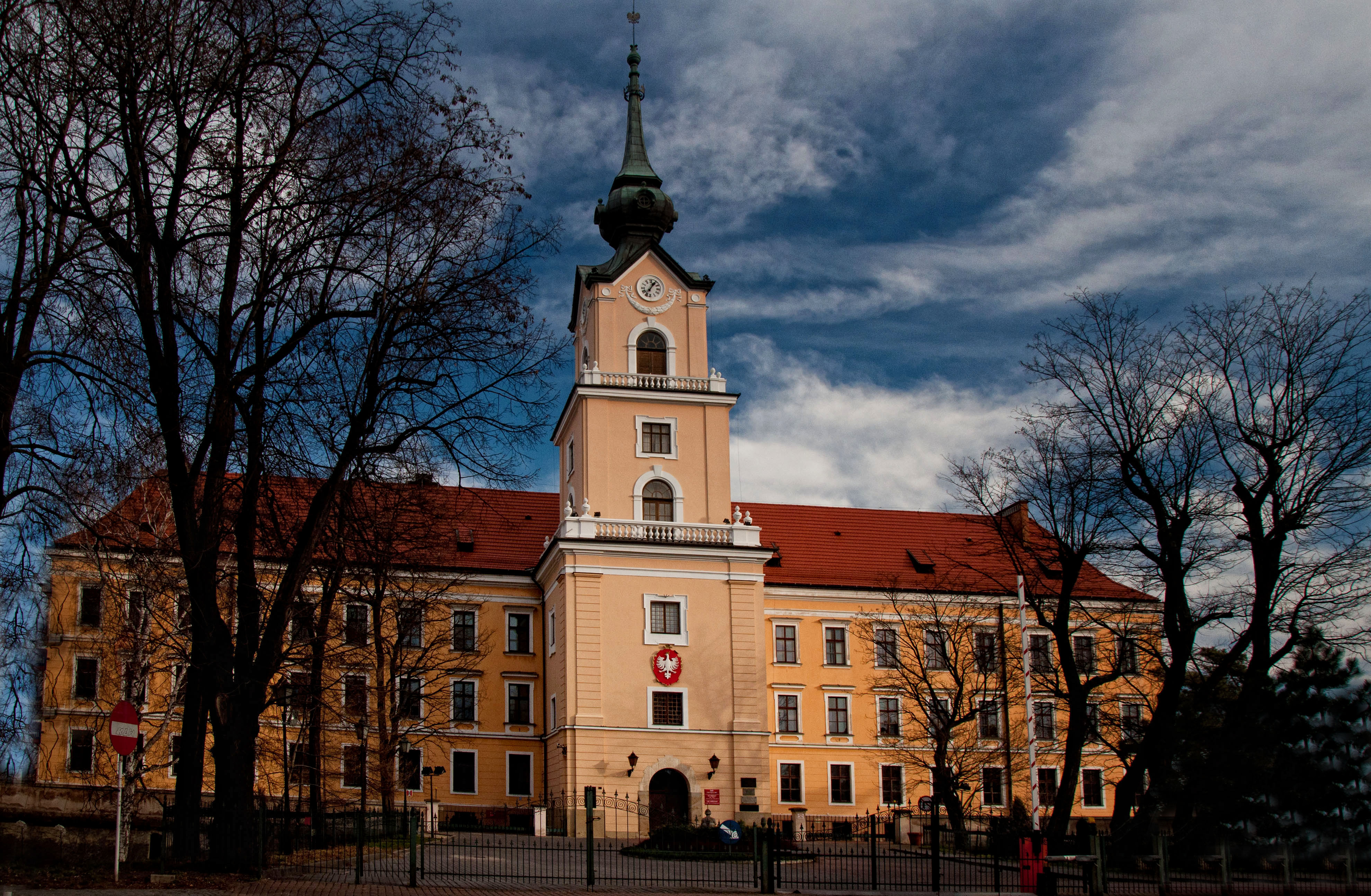
  Rzeszów Castle
- Rzucewo Castle – Pomeranian Voivodeship

== S ==
- Sandomierz Castle – Świętokrzyskie Voivodeship
- Sanok Castle – Subcarpathian Voivodeship
- Sianów – West Pomeranian Voivodeship
- Siedlisko – Lubusz Voivodeship
- Sieraków – Greater Poland Voivodeship
- Siewierz – Silesian Voivodeship
- Siedlęcin Tower in Siedlęcin – Lower Silesian Voivodeship
- Sielecki Castle in Sosnowiec – Silesian Voivodeship

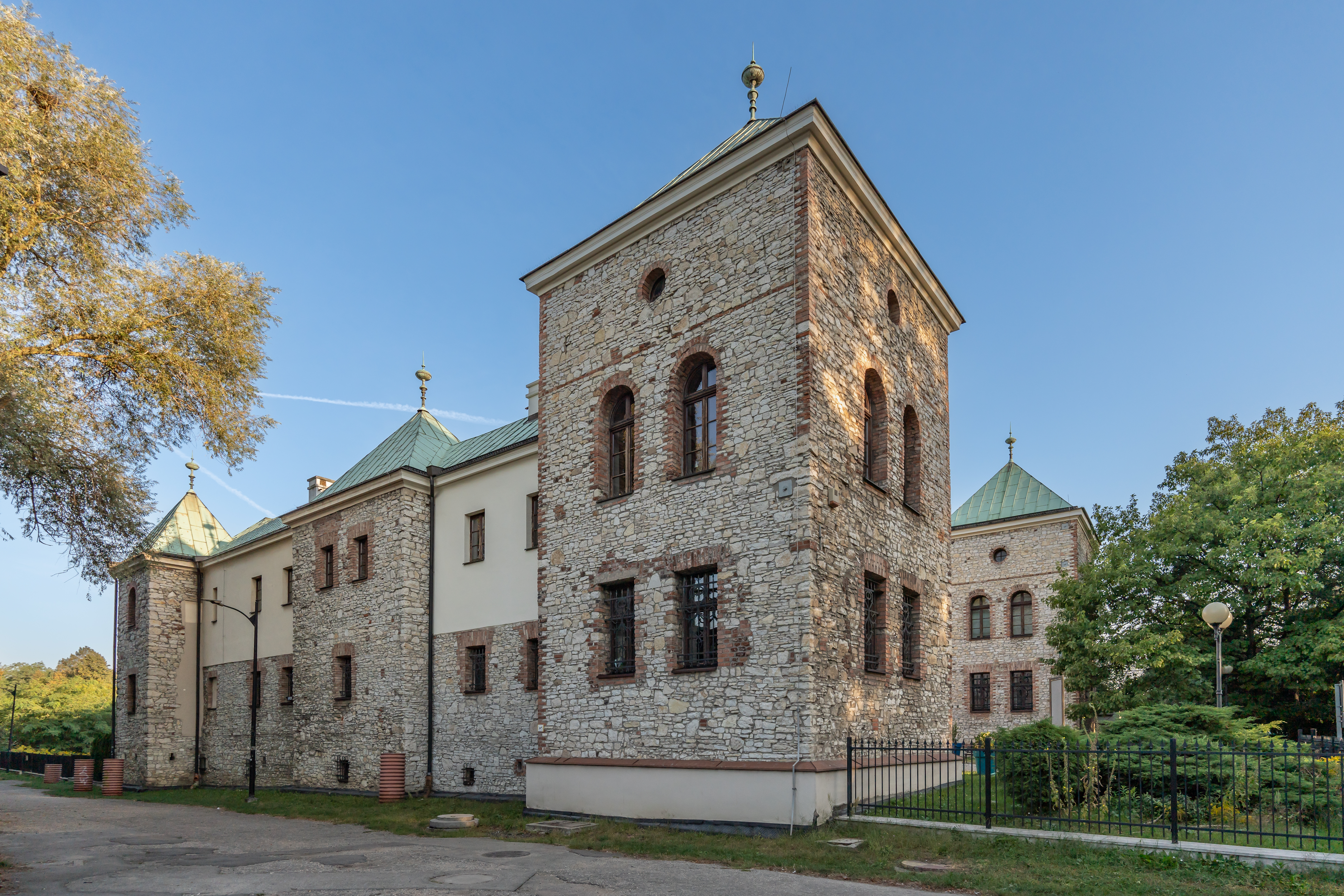
Sielecki Castle

- Skarszewy – Pomeranian Voivodeship
- Skępe – Kuyavian-Pomeranian Voivodeship
- Skierbieszów – Lublin Voivodeship
- Sławków – Silesian Voivodeship (ruins)
- Słońsk – Lubusz Voivodeship
- Słupsk Castle – Pomeranian Voivodeship
- Smolajny – Warmian-Masurian Voivodeship
- Smolec – Lower Silesian Voivodeship (ruins)
- Smoleń – Silesian Voivodeship
- Sobień Castle in Manasterzec, Subcarpathian Voivodeship (ruins)
- Sochaczew – Masovian Voivodeship (ruins)
- Solec nad Wisłą – Masovian Voivodeship (ruins)
- Spycimierz – Łódź Voivodeship
- Stary Dzierzgoń – Pomeranian Voivodeship
- Stobnica Castle – Greater Poland Voivodeship
- Stołpie – Lublin Voivodeship
- Strzegom – Lower Silesian Voivodeship
- Strzygi – Kuyavian-Pomeranian Voivodeship
- Suchań – West Pomeranian Voivodeship
- Susiec – Lublin Voivodeship
- Swobnica – West Pomeranian Voivodeship
- Syców – Lower Silesian Voivodeship
- Szaflary – Lesser Poland Voivodeship
- Szamotuły – Greater Poland Voivodeship
- Szczebrzeszyn – Lublin Voivodeship (ruins)
- Szestno – Warmian-Masurian Voivodeship (ruins)
- Ducal Castle in Szczecin – West Pomeranian Voivodeship

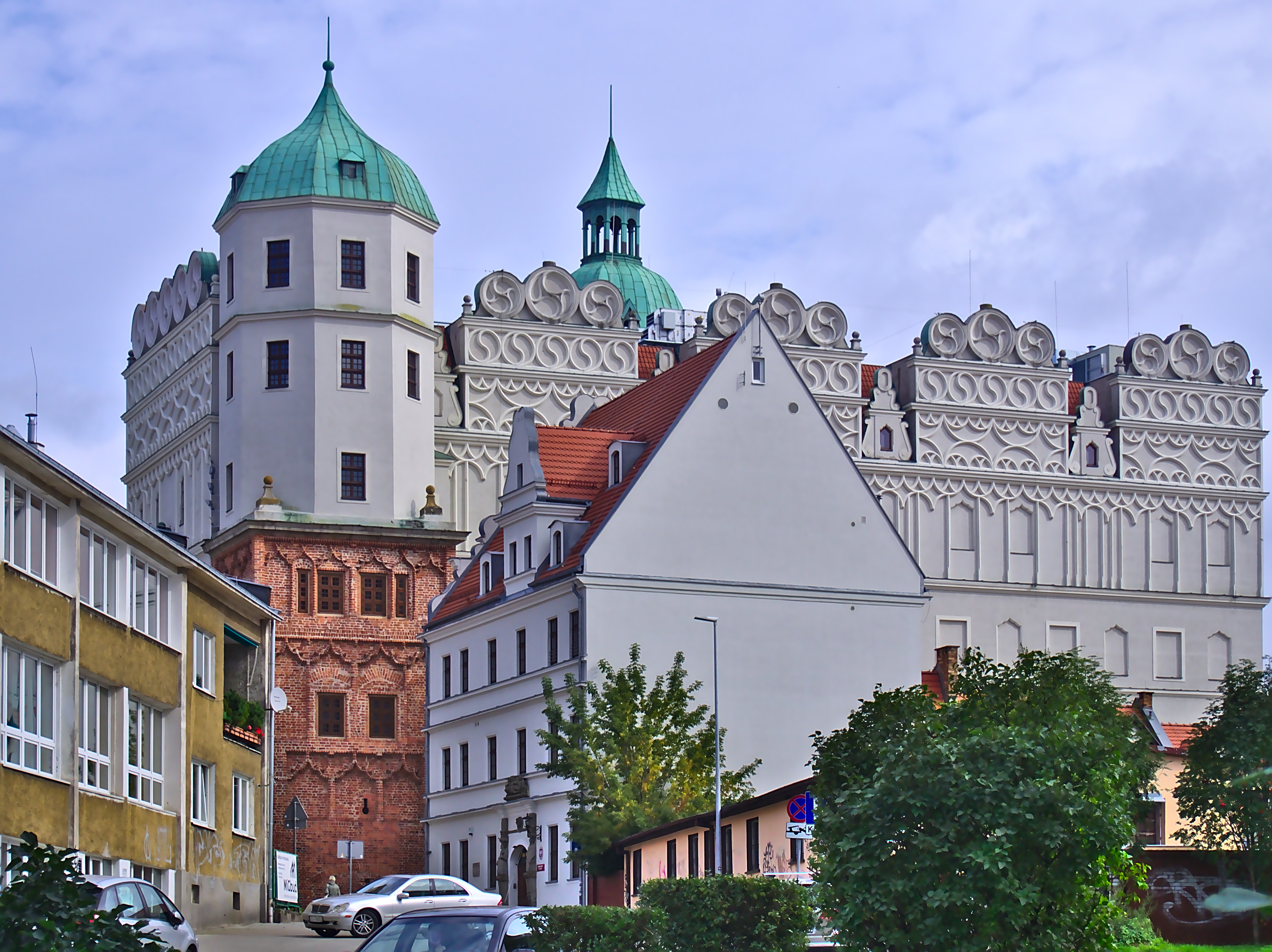
Ducal Castle, Szczecin

- Szczecinek Castle in Szczecinek, West Pomeranian Voivodship
- Szprotawa – Lower Silesian Voivodeship
- Szreńsk – Masovian Voivodeship (ruins)
- Sztum – Pomeranian Voivodeship
- Szubin – Kuyavian-Pomeranian Voivodeship (ruins)
- Szydłowiec – Mazovian Voivodeship
- Szydłów – Świętokrzyskie Voivodeship
- Szymbark – Lesser Poland Voivodeship

== Ś ==
- Ścinawa – Lower Silesian Voivodeship
- Świdwin – West Pomeranian Voivodeship
- Świecie Castle in Świecie, Kuyavian-Pomeranian Voivodeship
- Świecie Castle in Świecie, Lower Silesian Voivodeship (ruins)
- Świny – Lower Silesian Voivodeship (ruins)

== T ==
- Taczanów – Greater Poland Voivodeship
- Tarnów – Lesser Poland Voivodeship
- Tenczyn Castle in Rudno, Lesser Poland Voivodeship
- Toruń Castle in Toruń, Kuyavian-Pomeranian Voivodeship
- Tropsztyn Castle in Wytrzyszczka – Lesser Poland Voivodeship
- Trzebina Castle in Trzebina, Opole Voivodeship (ruins)
- Trzewlin Castle in Wielka Wieś, Lesser Poland Voivodeship (ruins)
- Tuczno Castle in Tuczno, West Pomeranian Voivodeship
- Tudorów – Świętokrzyskie Voivodeship (ruins)
- Tuligłowy – Subcarpathian Voivodeship
- Tykocin Castle – Podlaskie Voivodeship

Tykocin Castle

- Tyszowce – Lublin Voivodeship

Toszek / Gliwice voivodeship

== U ==
- Udórz – Silesian Voivodeship (ruins)
- Uniejów Castle in Uniejów – Łódź Voivodeship
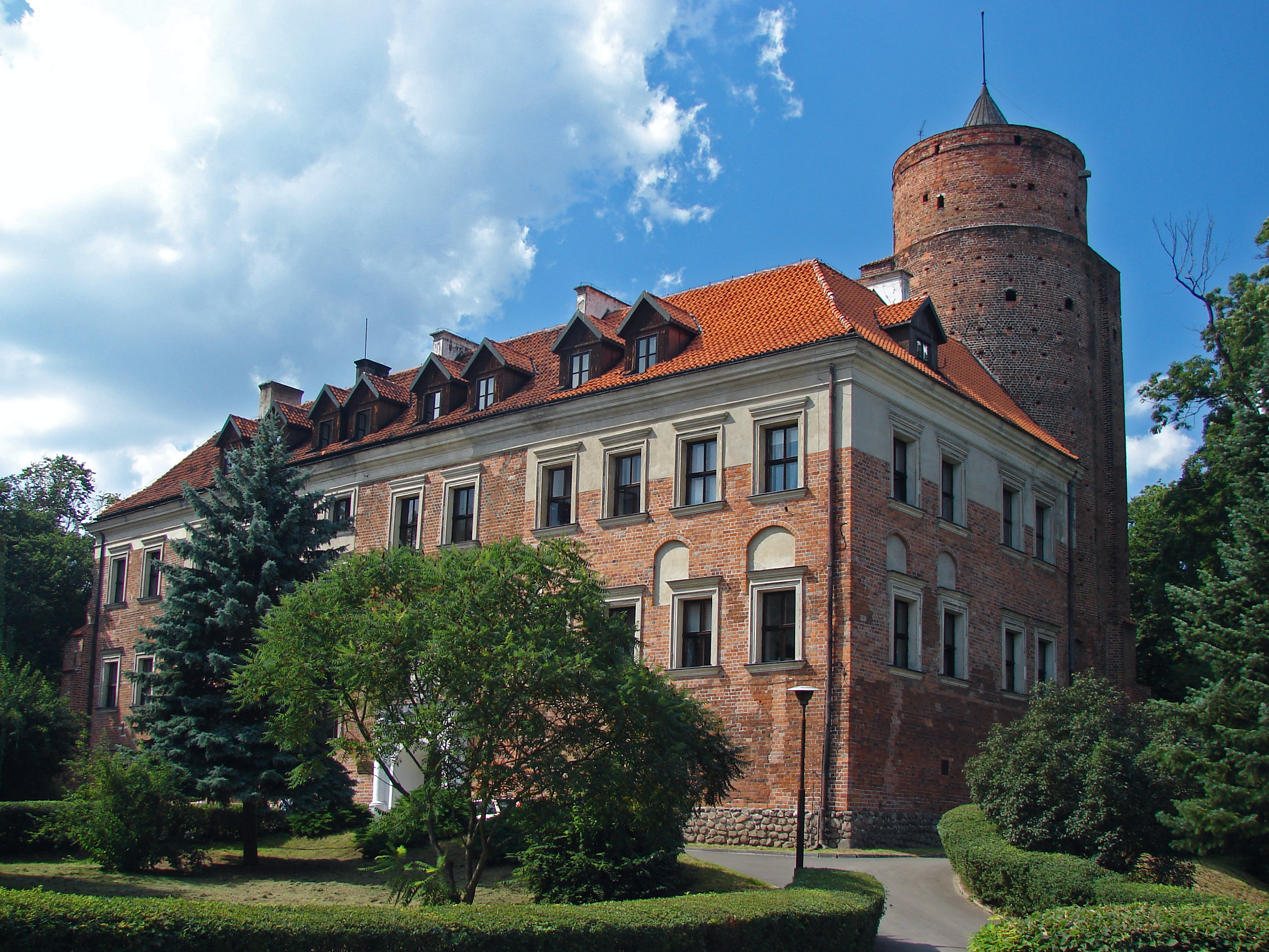
  Uniejów Castle
- Uraz – Lower Silesian Voivodeship

== W ==
- Warta Bolesławiecka – Lower Silesian Voivodeship (ruins)
- Wąbrzeźno – Kuyavian-Pomeranian Voivodeship (ruins)
- Węgierka – Subcarpathian Voivodeship
- Wałcz – West Pomeranian Voivodeship
- Warsaw – Royal Castle

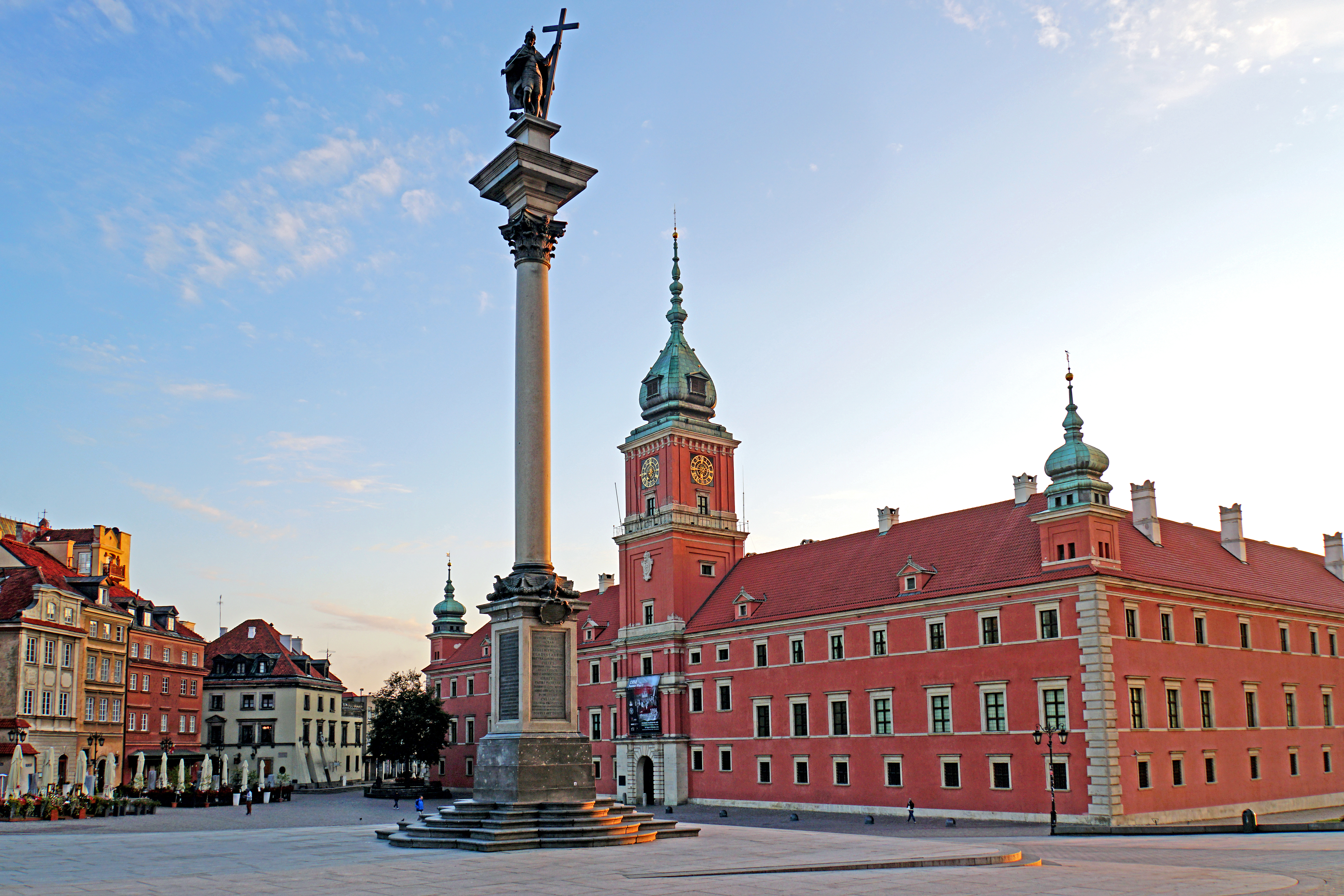
Royal Castle, Warsaw, a UNESCO World Heritage Site

- Warsaw – Ujazdów Castle
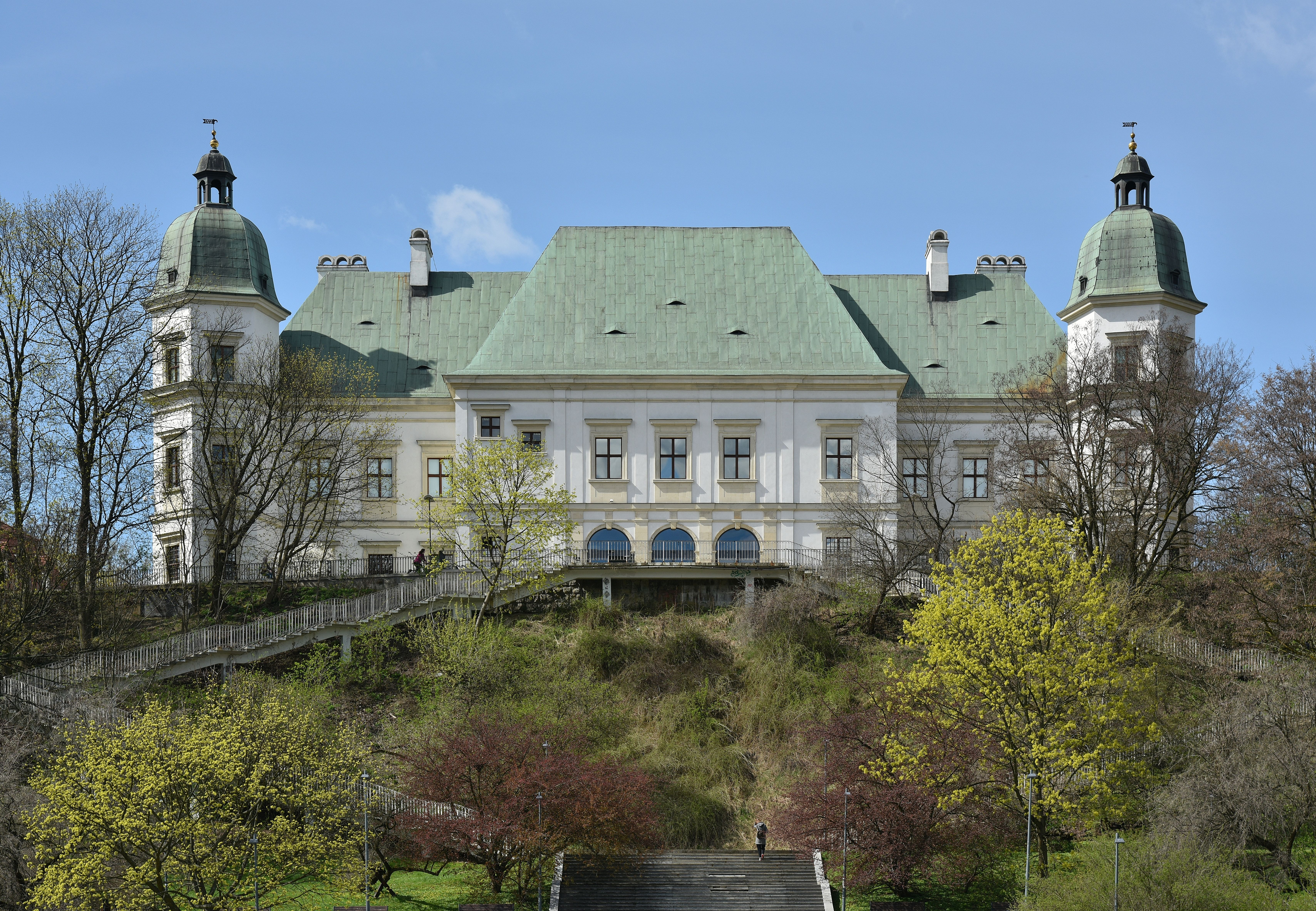
  Ujazdów Castle, Warsaw
- Warsaw – Ostrogski Castle
- Wawel Castle in Kraków, Lesser Poland Voivodeship

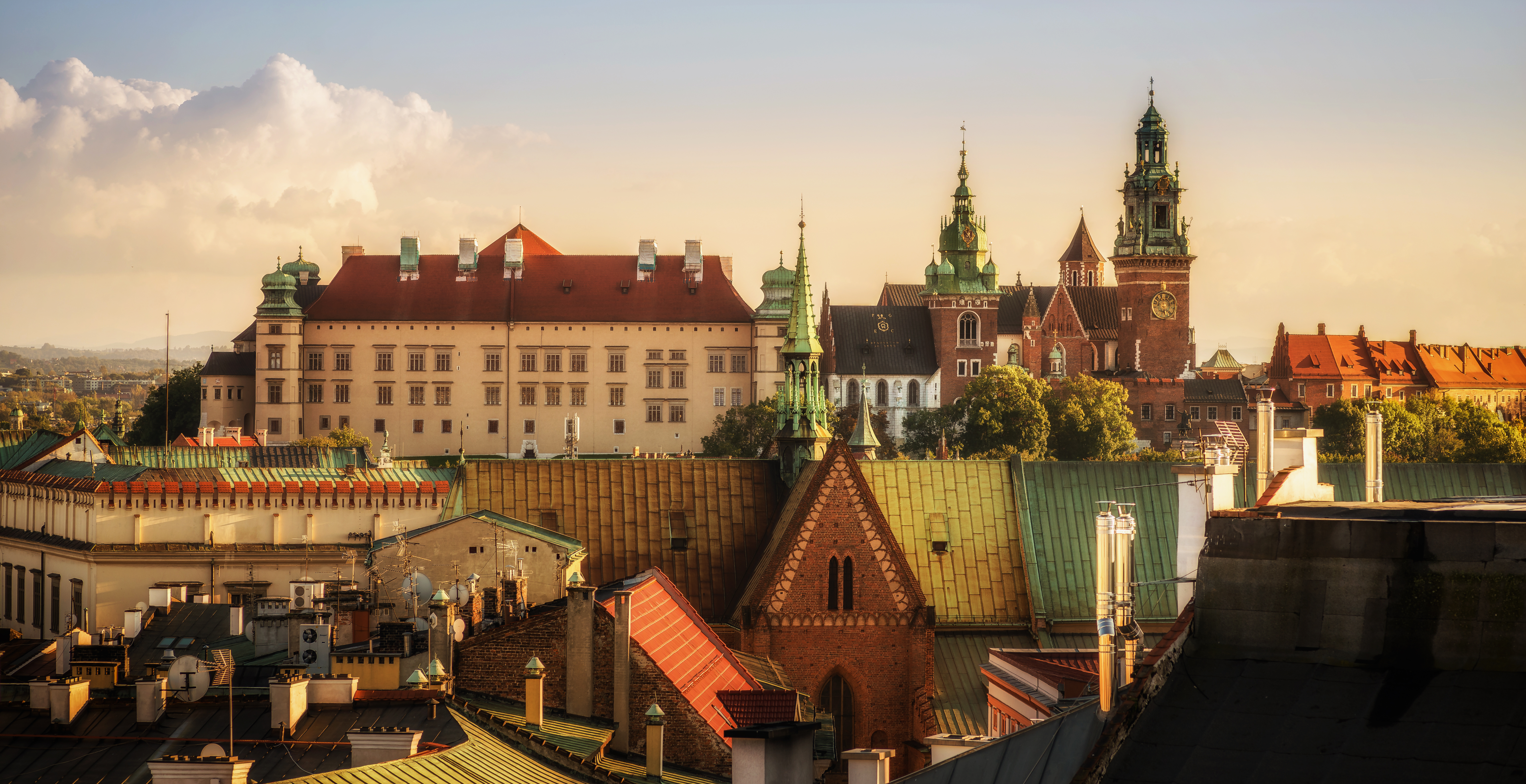
Wawel Castle in Kraków, a UNESCO World Heritage Site

- Wenecja Castle in Wenecja, Kuyavian-Pomeranian Voivodeship (ruins)
- Węgorzewo Castle in Węgorzewo, Warmian-Masurian Voivodeship
- Wieliczka – Lesser Poland Voivodeship
- Wieruszyce – Lesser Poland Voivodeship
- Wierzchosławice – Lesser Poland Voivodeship
- Wiewiórka – Subcarpathian Voivodeship
- Witostowice – Lower Silesian Voivodeship
- Wleń – Lower Silesian Voivodeship
- Wodzisław Castle in Wodzisław Śląski - Silesian Voivodeship
- Wojanów, Lower Silesian Voivodeship

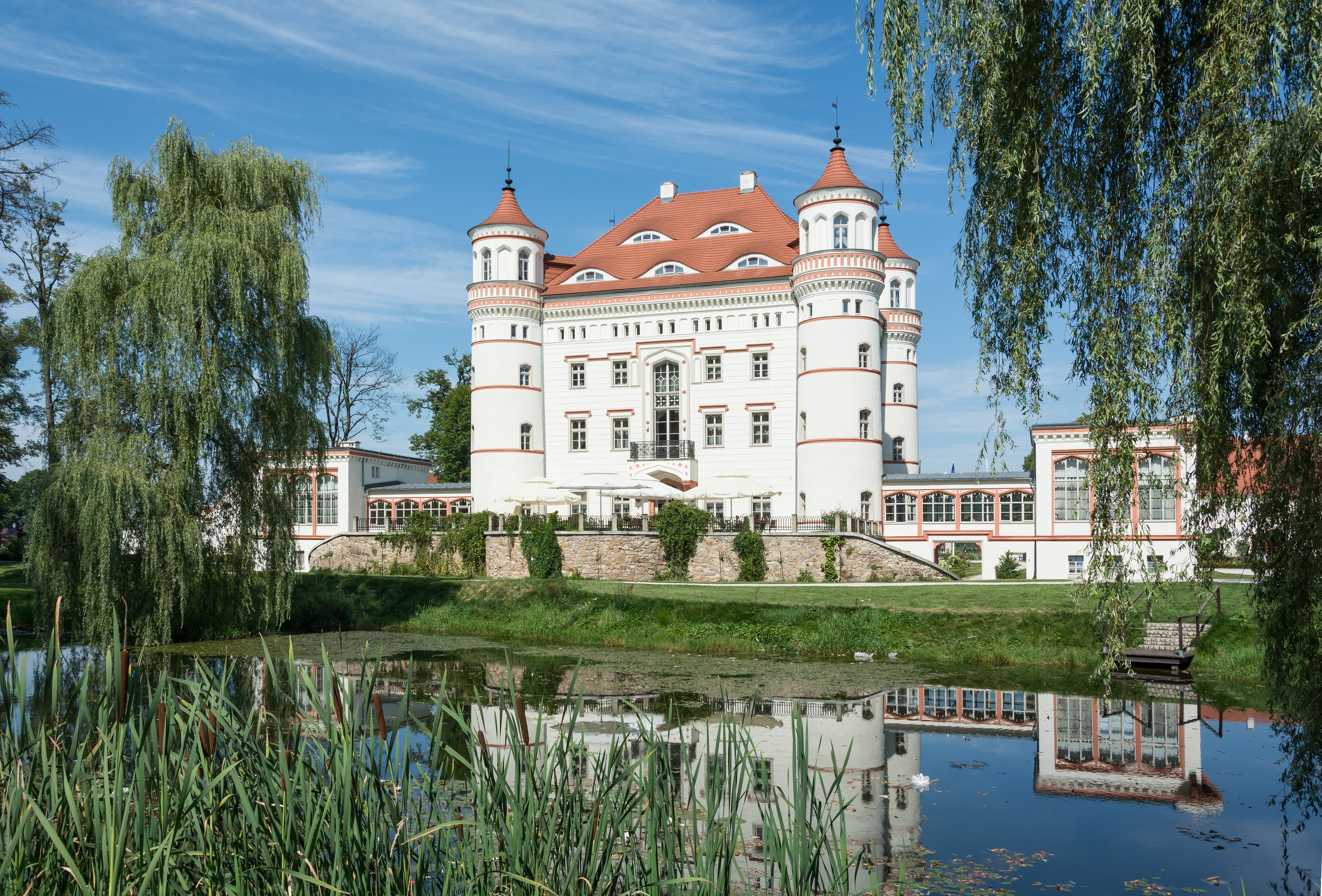
Wojanów Castle

- Wojciechów – Lublin Voivodeship
- Wolibórz – Lower Silesian Voivodeship
- Wołczyn – Opole Voivodeship

== Z ==
- Zabór – Lubusz Voivodeship
- Zabrzeż – Lesser Poland Voivodeship
- Zagórz – Subcarpathian Voivodeship
- Załóż – Subcarpathian Voivodeship
- Zamek Bierzgłowski (Bierzgłowo Castle) – Kuyavian-Pomeranian Voivodeship
- Zamość – Lublin Voivodeship
- Zatoń – Lubusz Voivodeship
- Zator – Lesser Poland Voivodeship
- Zawada – Subcarpathian Voivodeship
- Zawichost – Świętokrzyskie Voivodeship
- Zawidów – Lower Silesian Voivodeship
- Zawiercie – Lesser Poland Voivodeship

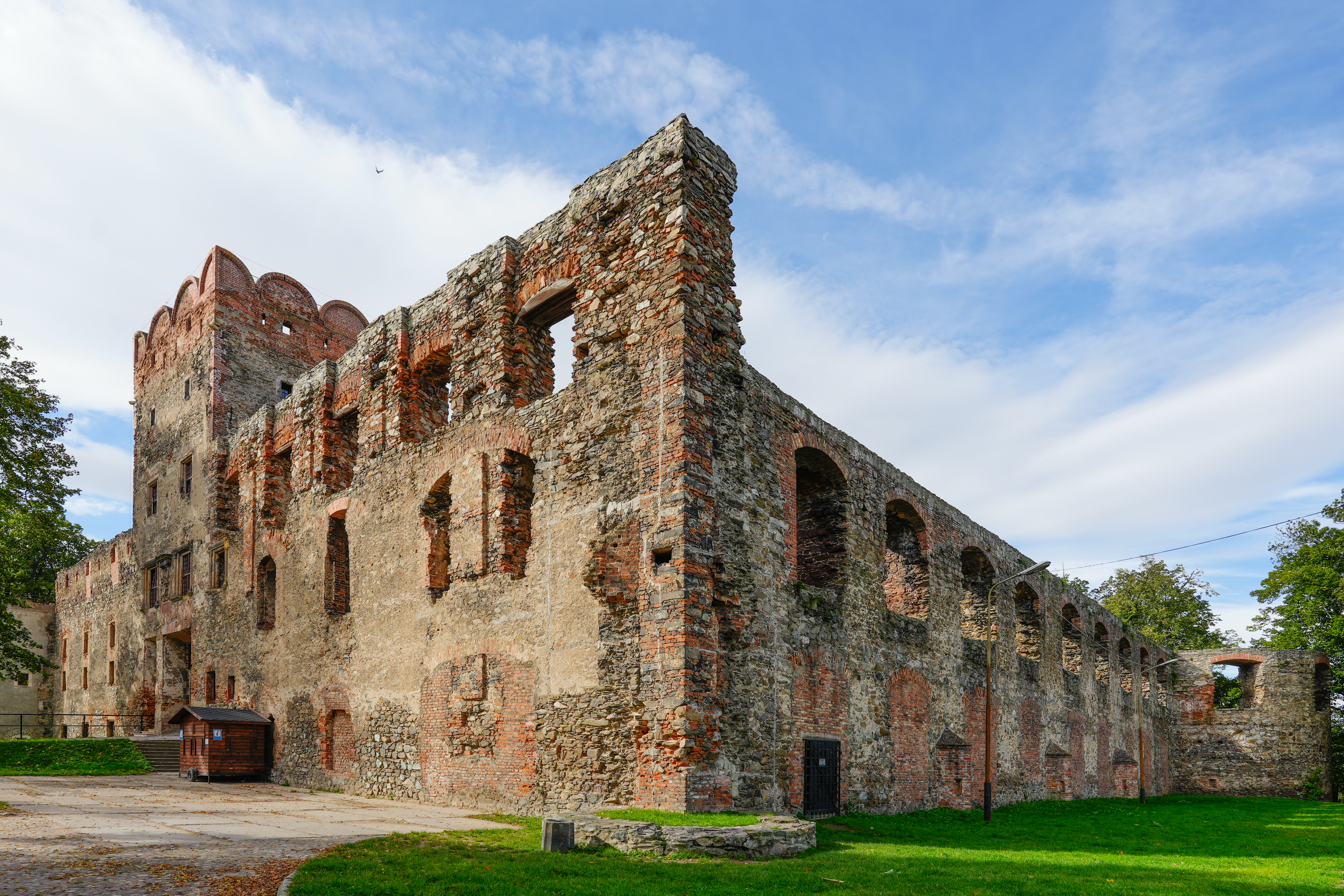
Ząbkowice Śląskie Castle

- Ząbkowice Śląskie – Lower Silesian Voivodeship
- Zboiska – Subcarpathian Voivodeship
- Zgórsko–Podborze – Subcarpathian Voivodeship
- Ziębice – Lower Silesian Voivodeship
- Złocieniec – West Pomeranian Voivodeship (ruins)
- Złotoria – Kuyavian-Pomeranian Voivodeship (ruins)

== Ż ==
- Żałe – Kuyavian-Pomeranian Voivodeship
- Żagań – Lubusz Voivodeship
- Żmigród – Lower Silesian Voivodeship
- Żywiec Castle – Silesian Voivodeship

== List of fortressess ==
- Boyen Fortress in Giżycko, Warmian-Masurian Voivodeship
- Fort Srebrna Góra in Srebrna Góra, Lower Silesian Voivodeship
- Grudziądz Fortress in Grudziądz, Kuyavian-Pomeranian Voivodeship
- Kłodzko Fortress in Kłodzko, Lower Silesian Voivodeship
- Kołobrzeg Fortress in Kołobrzeg, West Pomeranian Voivodeship
- Kraków Fortress in Kraków, Lesser Poland Voivodeship
- Modlin Fortress in Nowy Dwór Mazowiecki, Mazovian Voivodeship
- Osowiec Fortress in Osowiec-Twierdza, Podlaskie Voivodeship
- Świnoujście Fortress in Świnoujście, West Pomeranian Voivodeship
- Toruń Fortress in Toruń, Kuyavian-Pomeranian Voivodeship
- Wisłoujście Fortress in Gdańsk, Pomeranian Voivodeship
