= Cisy Castle =

Ruined castle in Poland

- German: Burg Cisy, Cziskenberg, Zeisberg, Zeisburg, Zeiskenschloss; Polish: Zamek Cieszów, Zamek Cisów, Zamek Cisy
- Gmina Stare Bogaczowice, Lower Silesian Voivodeship in Poland
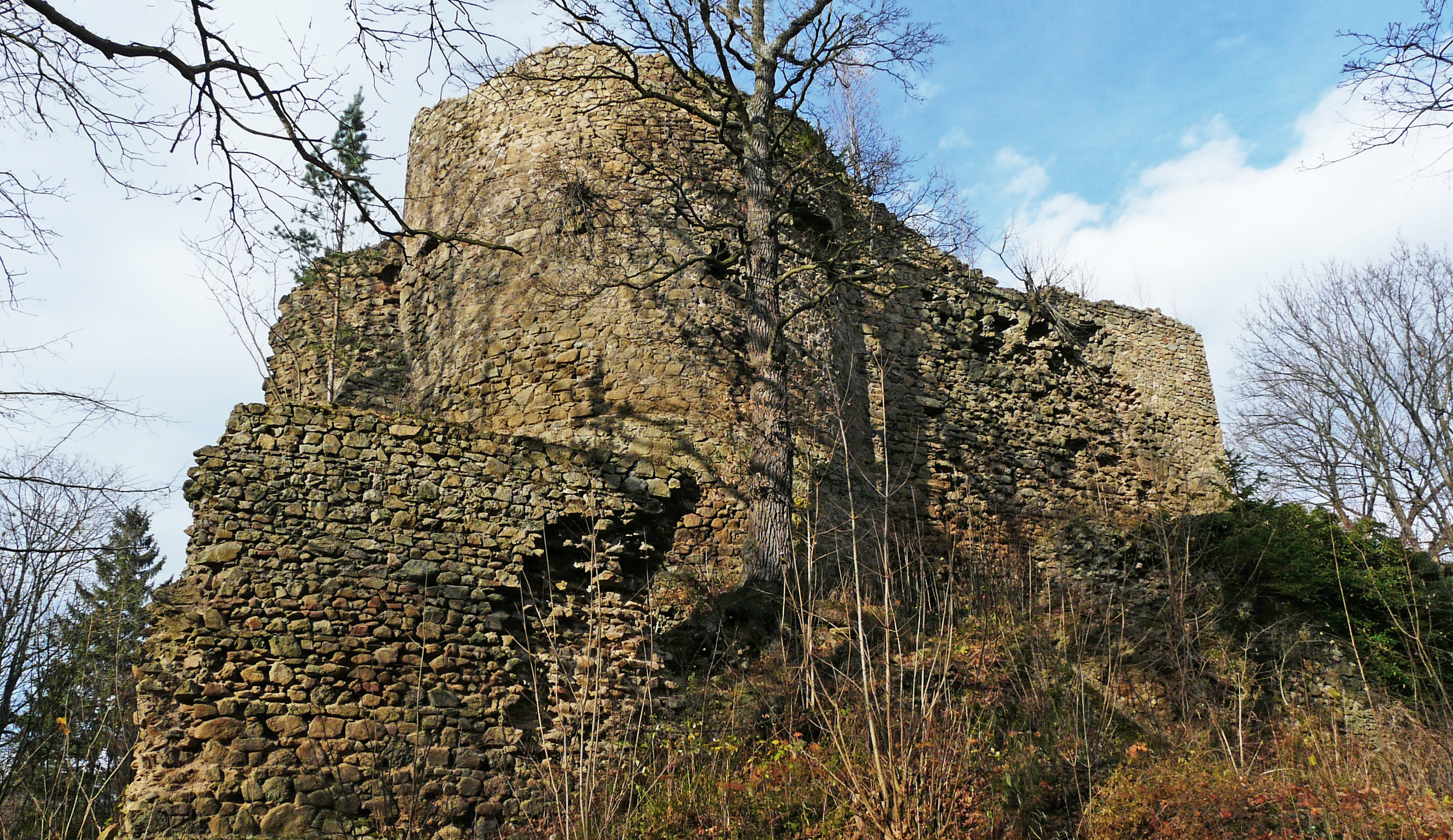
- Cisy Castle

Site information
- Condition: Ruins

Location
- Coordinates: 50°51′38″N 16°14′51″E

Site history
- Built: 13th-14th century

Cisy Castle is a ruined mediaeval hillside castle near the village of Cieszów, in Gmina Stare Bogaczowice (a municipality), Wałbrzych County, Lower Silesian Voivodeship, Poland.

== History ==
Sources disagree with each other (and sometimes within themselves) over historical details, and are not easy to reconcile. There seems to have been some sort of stronghold on the site from the 10th or 11th century. The date of construction of Cisy Castle is uncertain. So too is its date of first historical mention; for which sources variously say 1240, 1243, 1264, and 1327.

According to some accounts, construction was begun under Bolko I the Strict (1252/56 - 1301) of the house of Piast, and was completed under his grandson Bolko II the Small (c. 1312 – 1368). According to another account, in 1355 Bolko II captured the castle from robber knights. According to a yet another account, the castle was built by Bolko I at the turn of the 13th and 14th centuries, it was captured by robber knights, and it was subsequently recaptured by Bolko II. Its purpose was similar to those of the castles at Rogowiec, Grodno, Radosno, Nowy Dwór and Stary Książ: to guard the western borders of the Piast dukedoms of Świdnica and Jawor. The castle achieved its greatest fame during the late 14th century, when Nikel Bolcze, castellan of Strzegom, lived there, and was often visited by Agnes (1322-1392), widow of Bolko II, who had inherited the castle from him.

The castle next passed into Bohemian ownership. As already mentioned, sources are conflicting. (1) According to one account, ownership of the castle passed by prior agreement after the deaths of Nikel and of Agnes to new but unidentified owners, who enlarged it. In 1428, the castle was occupied by the Hussites during their unsuccessful struggle for religious freedom (1419-1434). It was subsequently occupied by robber knights. In 1484, they were expelled and the castle was destroyed. In the 16th century, ownership passed to the wealthy Czettritz family. During the Thirty Years War (1618-1648), the castle was burnt by Swedish troops during their intervention in that conflict. (2) According to another account, ownership passed by unspecified means. The castle was successively occupied by various families; namely, Zeispercek, A. von Grunau and Czettritz, and was further enlarged. (3) According to yet another account, in 1408 the castle was bought by Alexander von Grunau, and in 1429 by Ulrich von Seydlitz. In 1466, the castle was severely damaged by Hussite troops. (Note: A questionable statement. The Hussites had been suppressed in 1434.) It is conjectured that it was later repaired and improved. The castle was damaged again by Swedish troops during the Thirty Years War. It was subsequently (i.e. not earlier than the 17th century) taken over by the Czettritz family. (4) According to another account still, after Agnes' death the castle became the property of the king of Bohemia, who passed it in succession to two knightly families, von Grunau and von Czettritz. The castle was damaged during the Hussite Wars. It was subsequently repaired and strengthened. In 1643, Swedish troops destroyed it. After the end of the Thirty Years War, the Czettritz family reclaimed the castle, but did not repair it. Stones were removed and used in other buildings.

Later accounts also are not easy to reconcile. (1) According to one account, in 1794-1797 Jan Henryk VI von Hochberg commissioned architect Christian Tischbein to rebuild the ruins in an antique style appropriate to his castle of Nowy Dwór. (2) According to another account, the castle was abandoned around 1800. (3) According to still another account, authorities at the turn of the 18th and 19th centuries ordered that the castle be destroyed. (4) According to yet another account, the castle fell into ruin over the years as stones were taken away and used elsewhere. In 1830, what was left of the castle passed to the von Zieten family.

Some preservation and reconstruction work was carried out during the 19th century and between the World Wars. Those efforts were destroyed during fighting in 1945 towards the end of World War II. There have been more recent attempts to preserve the site, and to promote it as a tourist attraction.

== Description ==
The castle was built of local sandstone. Its walls were irregular, and were adapted to the hillside terrain. The original design seems to have included a fortified western entrance and a more-or-less square surrounding wall, with a circular Bergfried about 10 m (33 ft) in diameter in the southeastern corner; as well as a residential building at least two storeys in height in the opposite corner. Further military elements were added later. It was protected by a dry moat. The best preserved parts are the tower, fragments of the wall, remains of the gate, and a part of one of the residential buildings.

== See also ==
- Castles in Poland
