= Struga, Lower Silesian Voivodeship =

Struga
- Village
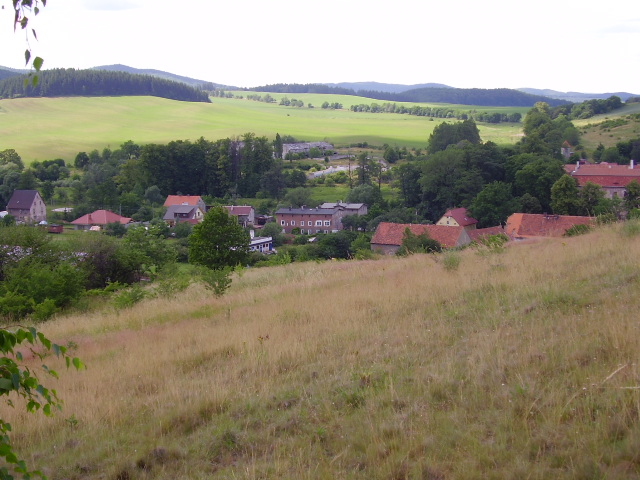

- Location within Poland
- Coordinates: 50°49′28″N 16°13′42″E
- Country: Poland
- Voivodeship: Lower Silesian
- County: Wałbrzych
- Gmina: Stare Bogaczowice
- Highest elevation: 400 m (1,300 ft)
- Lowest elevation: 380 m (1,250 ft)
- Population: 850
- Time zone: UTC+1 (CET)
  - Summer (DST): UTC+2 (CEST)
- Postal code: 58-311
- Area code: (+48) 74
- Vehicle registration: DBA

Struga ([ˈstruɡa]; German: Adelsbach) is a village in the administrative district of Gmina Stare Bogaczowice, within Wałbrzych County, Lower Silesian Voivodeship, in southwestern Poland. The village borders with the spa town of Szczawno-Zdrój in the east. It is located within the historic region of Lower Silesia.

Among the historic architecture of Struga are the Church of Our Lady of Sorrows, dating back to the 14th century, and an 18th-century palace.

The village is known as the site of the Battle of Struga, fought on May 15, 1807, in which the Poles defeated a much larger Prussian army.
