= Nowe Bogaczowice =

- Village
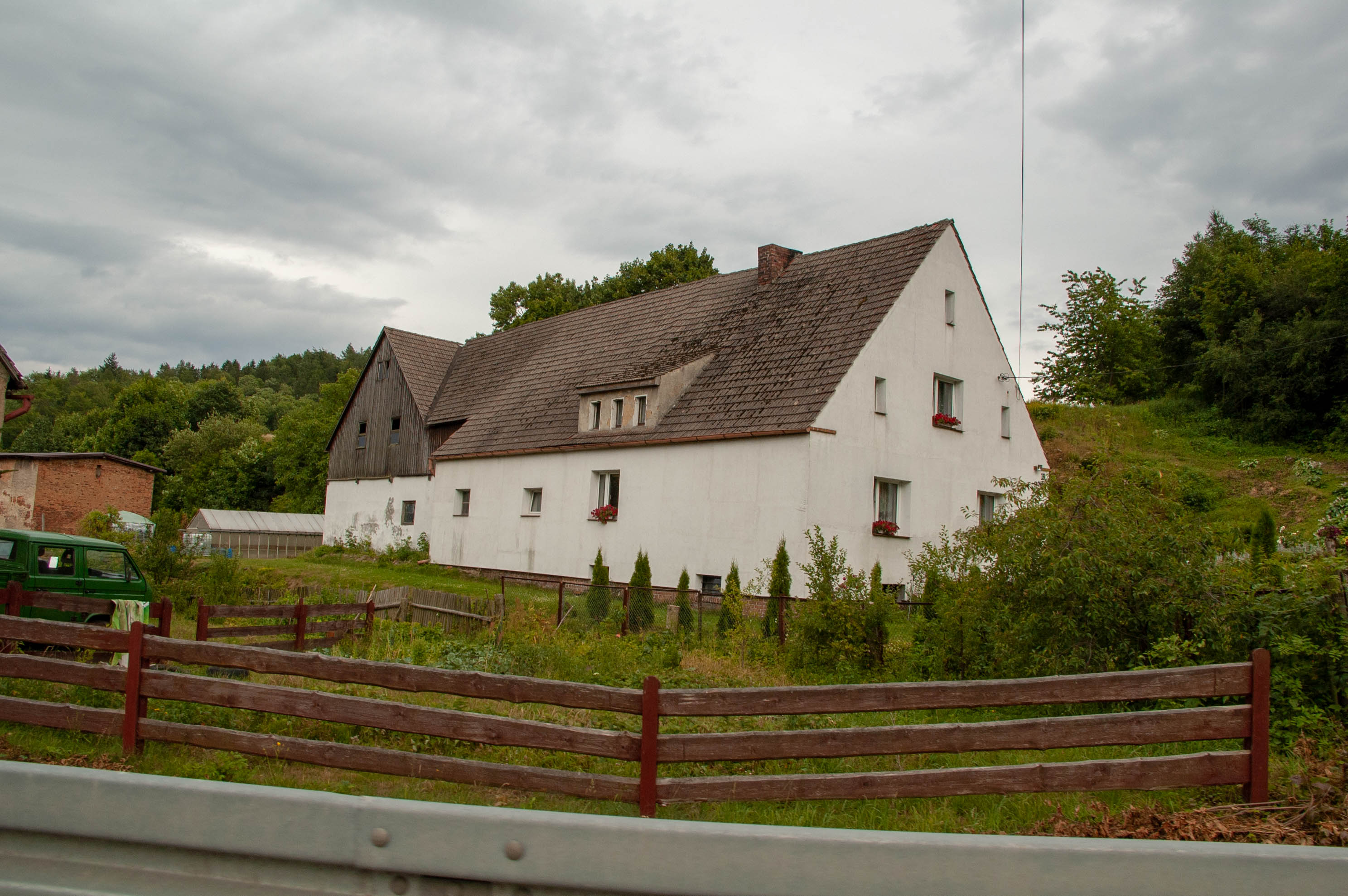
- House

- Location within Poland
- Coordinates: 50°51′N 16°8′E
- Country: Poland
- Voivodeship: Lower Silesian
- County: Wałbrzych
- Gmina: Stare Bogaczowice

Nowe Bogaczowice [ˈnɔvɛ bɔɡat͡ʂɔˈvit͡sɛ] is a village in the administrative district of Gmina Stare Bogaczowice, within Wałbrzych County, Lower Silesian Voivodeship, in south-western Poland.

== Gallery ==
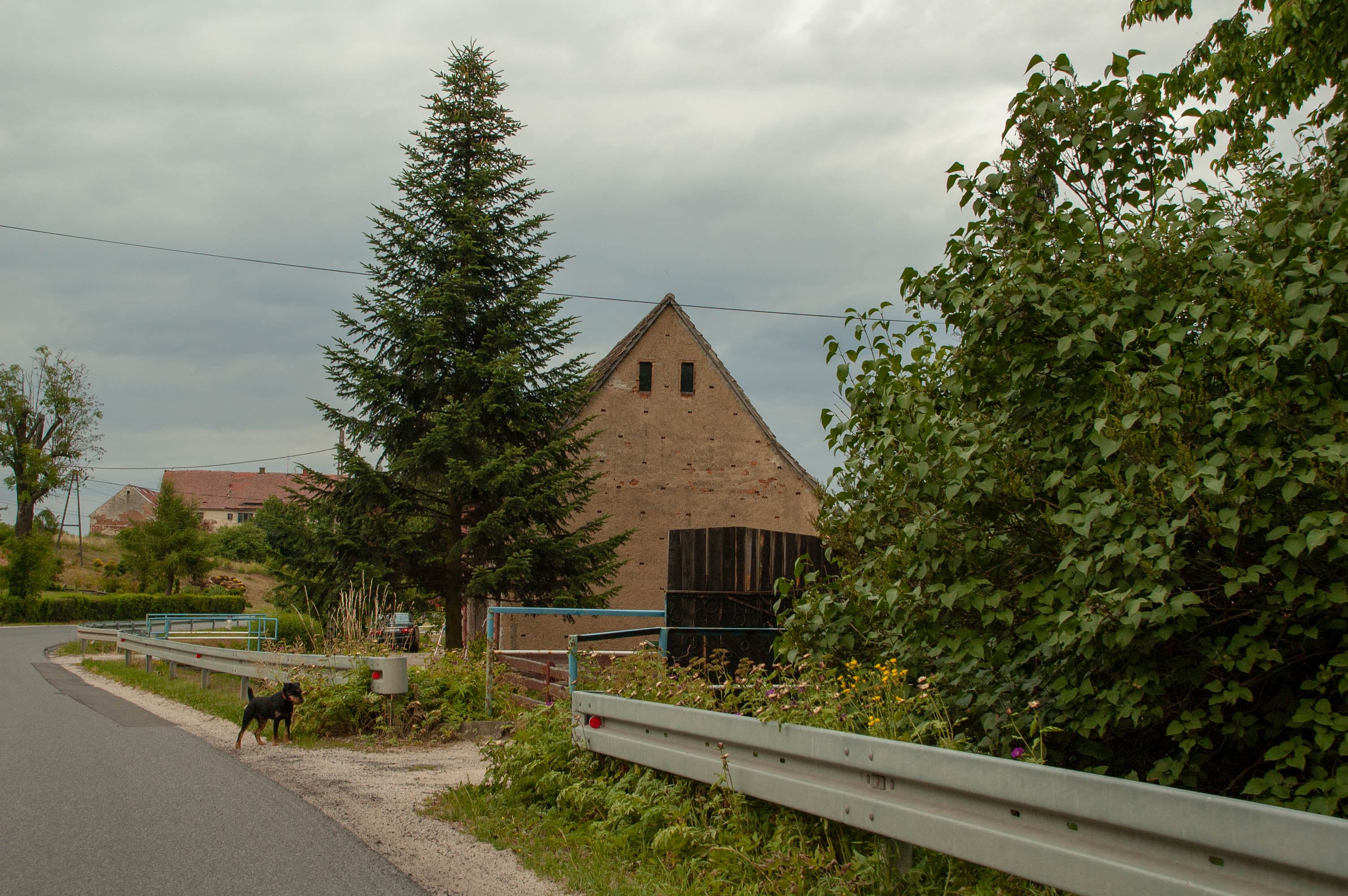
House by road

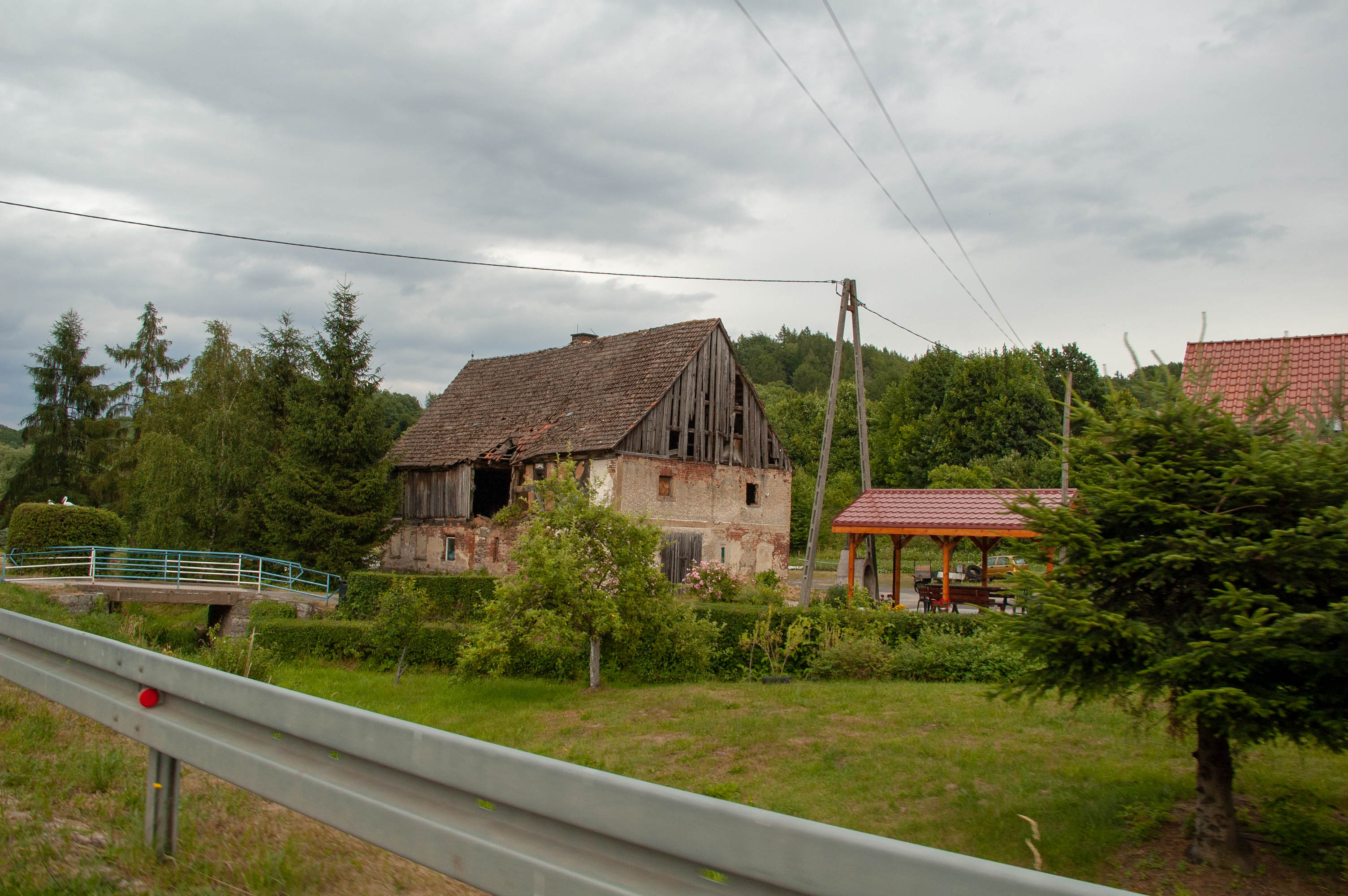
Barn

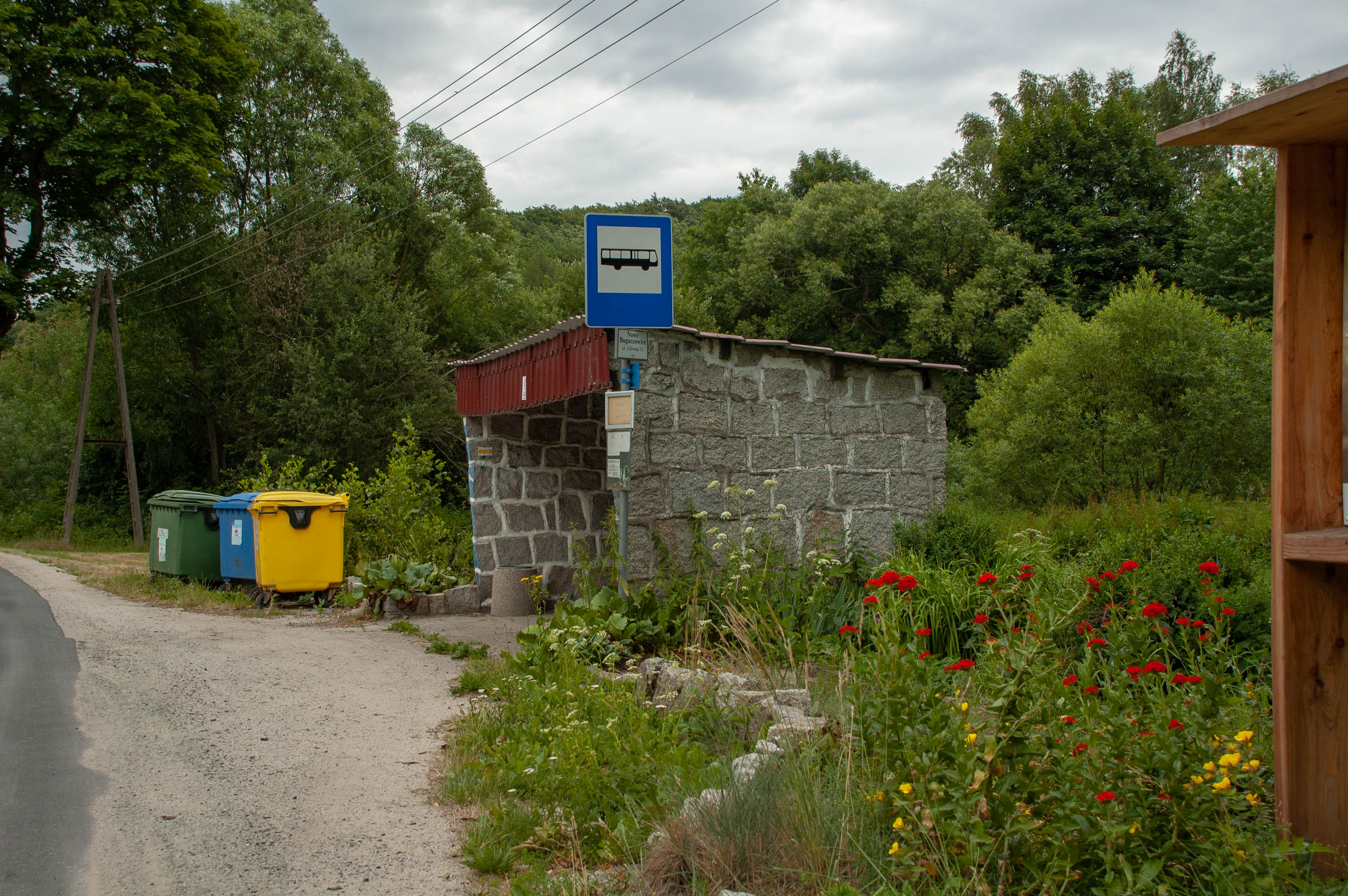
Bus stop
