= Wrony, Lower Silesian Voivodeship =

Wrony
- Village
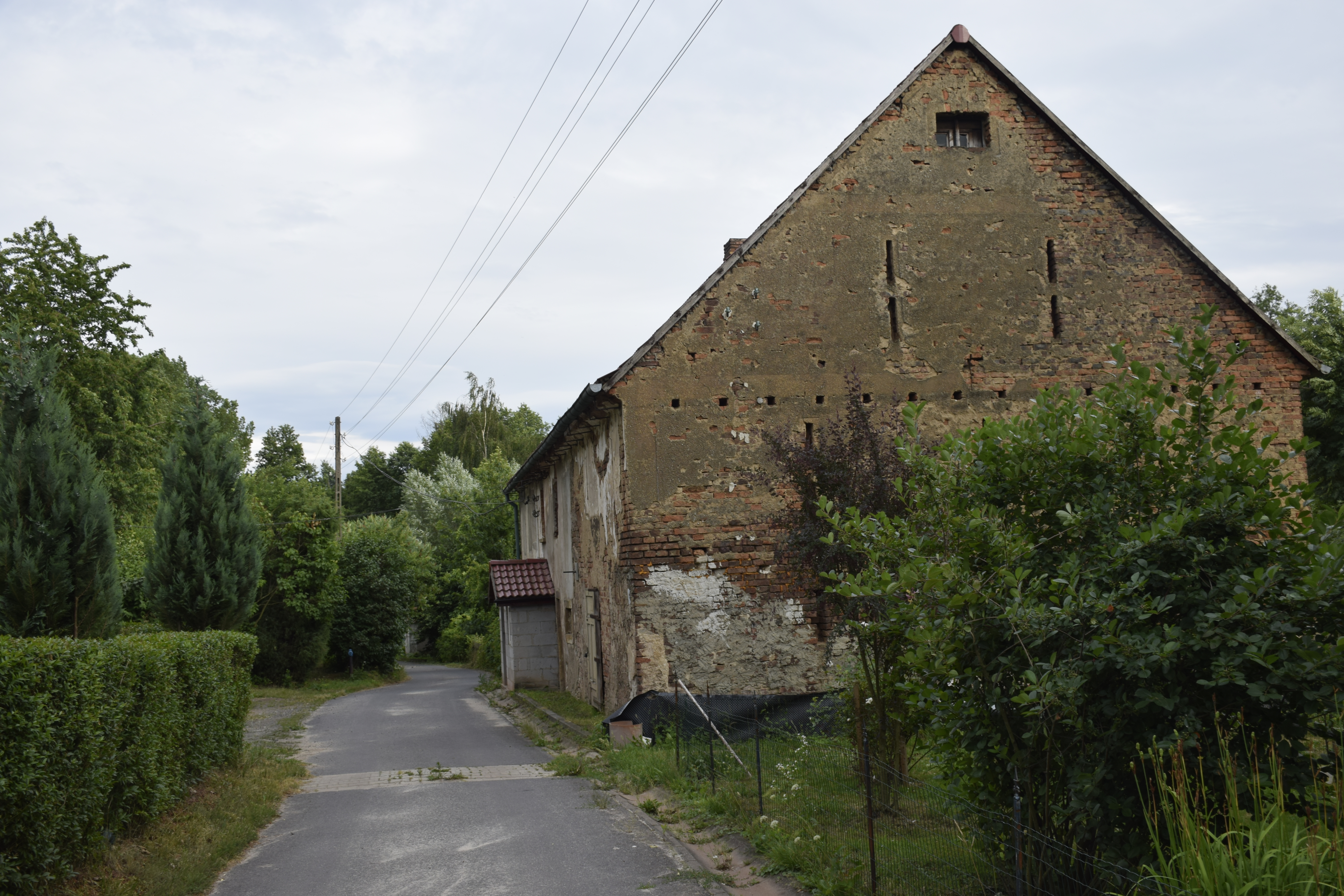
- Barn

- Location within Poland
- Coordinates: 50°51′35″N 16°11′12″E
- Country: Poland
- Voivodeship: Lower Silesian
- County: Wałbrzych
- Gmina: Stare Bogaczowice

Wrony [ˈvrɔnɨ] is a village in the administrative district of Gmina Stare Bogaczowice, within Wałbrzych County, Lower Silesian Voivodeship, in south-western Poland.

== Gallery ==
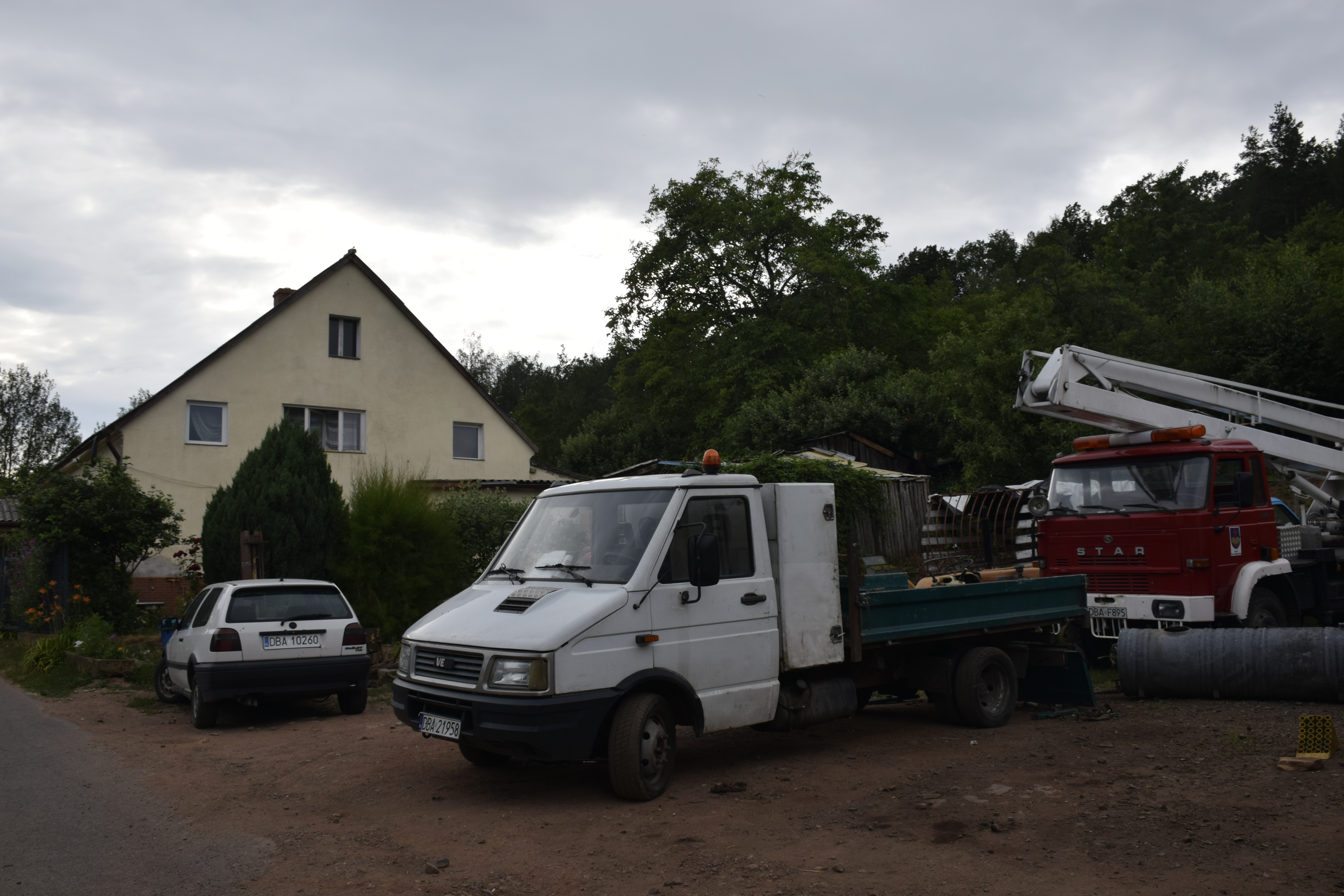
Vehicles

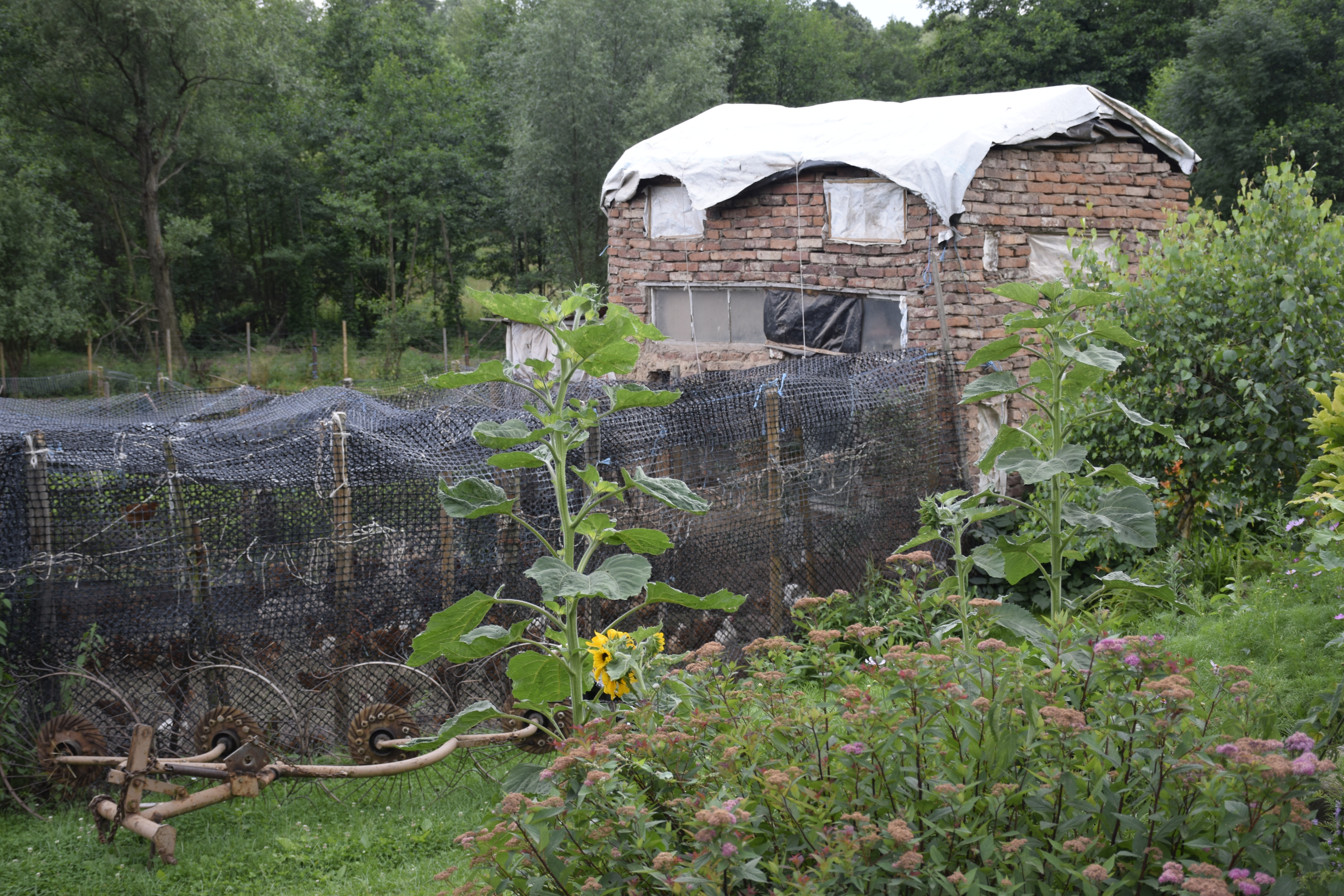
Garden

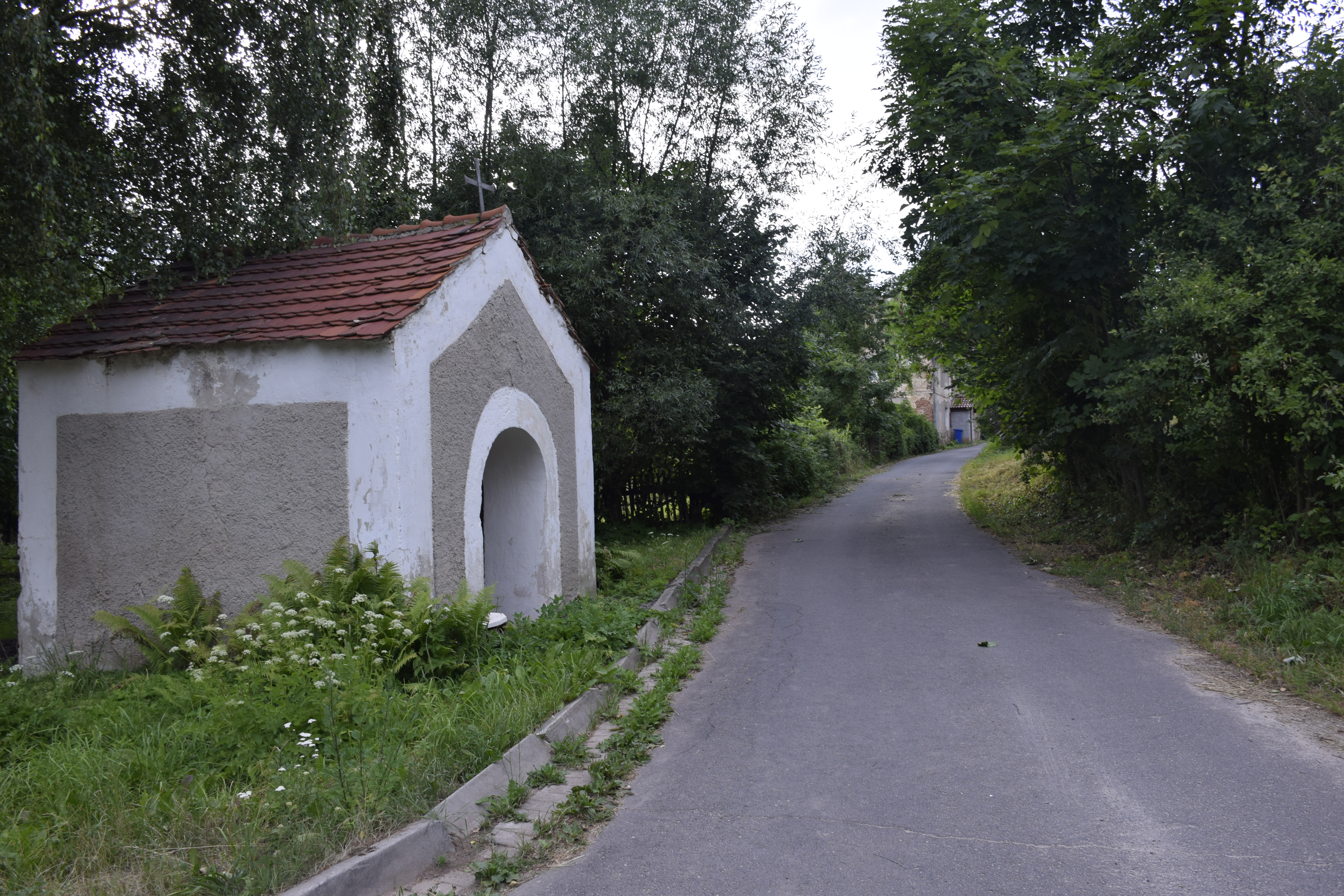
Village chapel

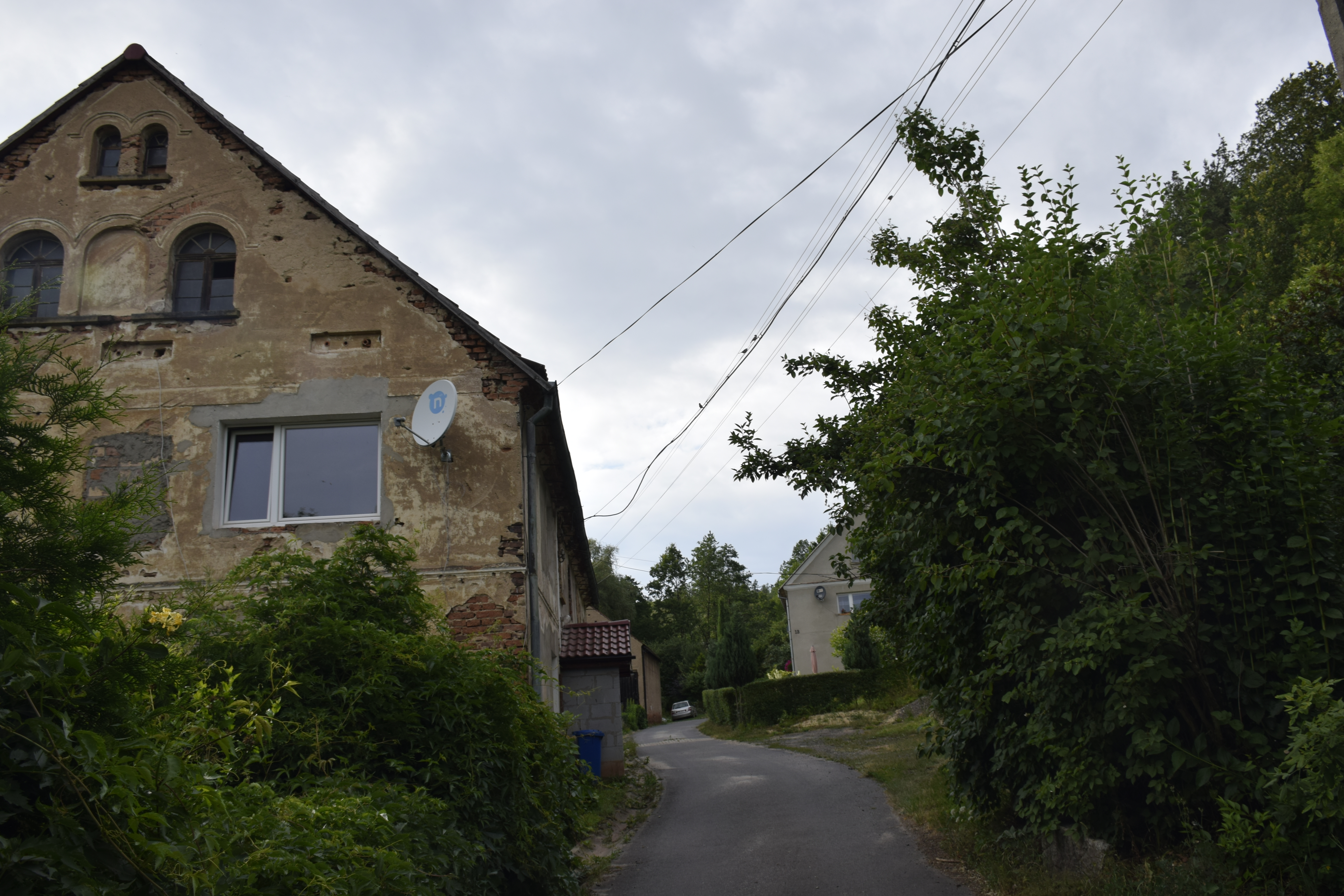
House by the road
