= Chwaliszów =

- Village
- Timber-framed house no. 94

- Location within Poland
- Coordinates: 50°51′55″N 16°13′32″E
- Country: Poland
- Voivodeship: Lower Silesian
- County: Wałbrzych
- Gmina: Stare Bogaczowice

Population
  - Total: 427
- Time zone: UTC+1 (CET)
  - Summer (DST): UTC+2 (CEST)
- Vehicle registration: DBA, DB

Chwaliszów [xfaˈliʂuf] is a village in the administrative district of Gmina Stare Bogaczowice, within Wałbrzych County, Lower Silesian Voivodeship, in south-western Poland.
