= Gostków, Lower Silesian Voivodeship =

Gostków
- Village
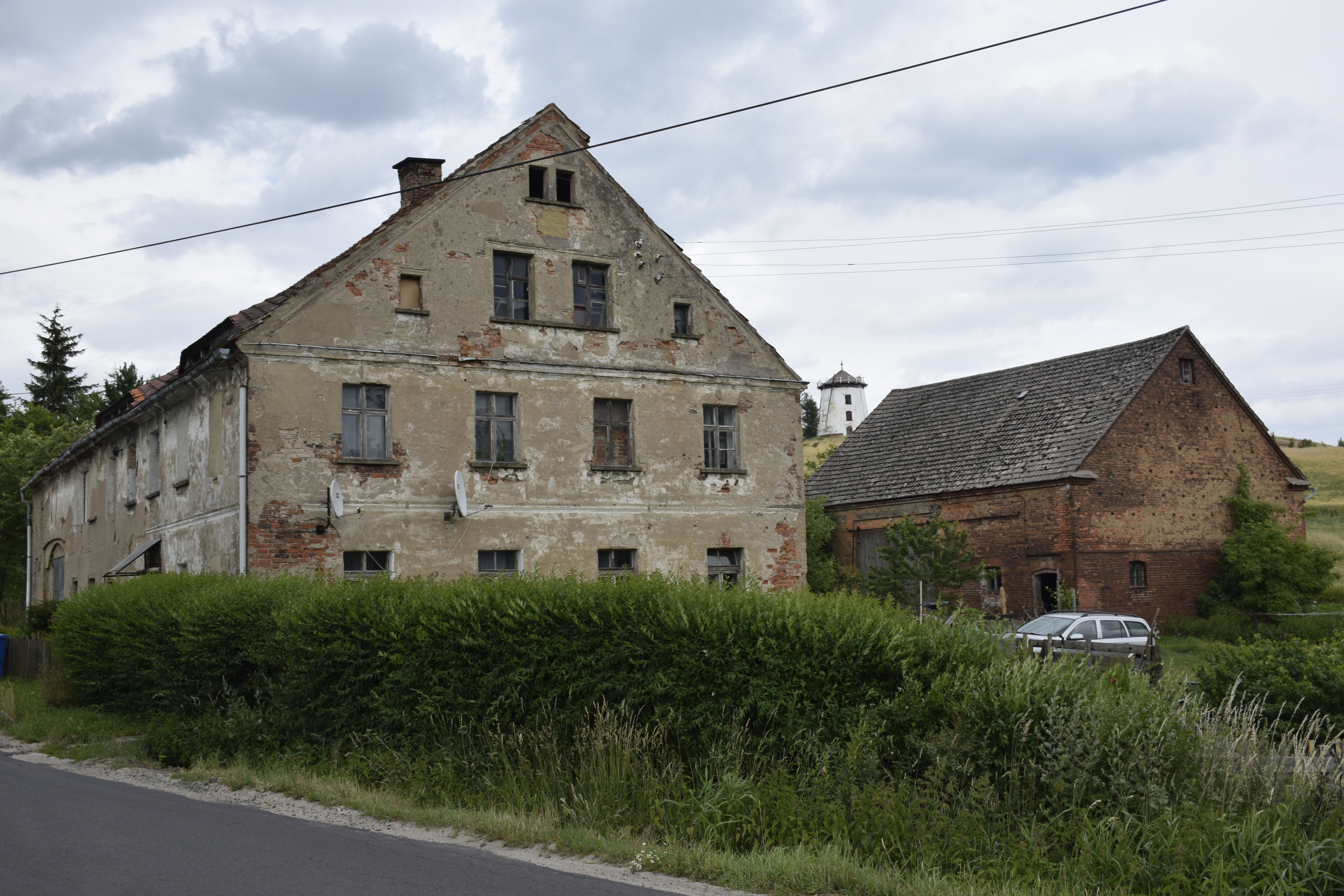
- A house

- Location within Poland
- Coordinates: 50°50′40″N 16°06′02″E
- Country: Poland
- Voivodeship: Lower Silesian
- County: Wałbrzych
- Gmina: Stare Bogaczowice

Gostków [ˈɡɔstkuf] is a village in the administrative district of Gmina Stare Bogaczowice, within Wałbrzych County, Lower Silesian Voivodeship, in south-western Poland.

== Gallery ==
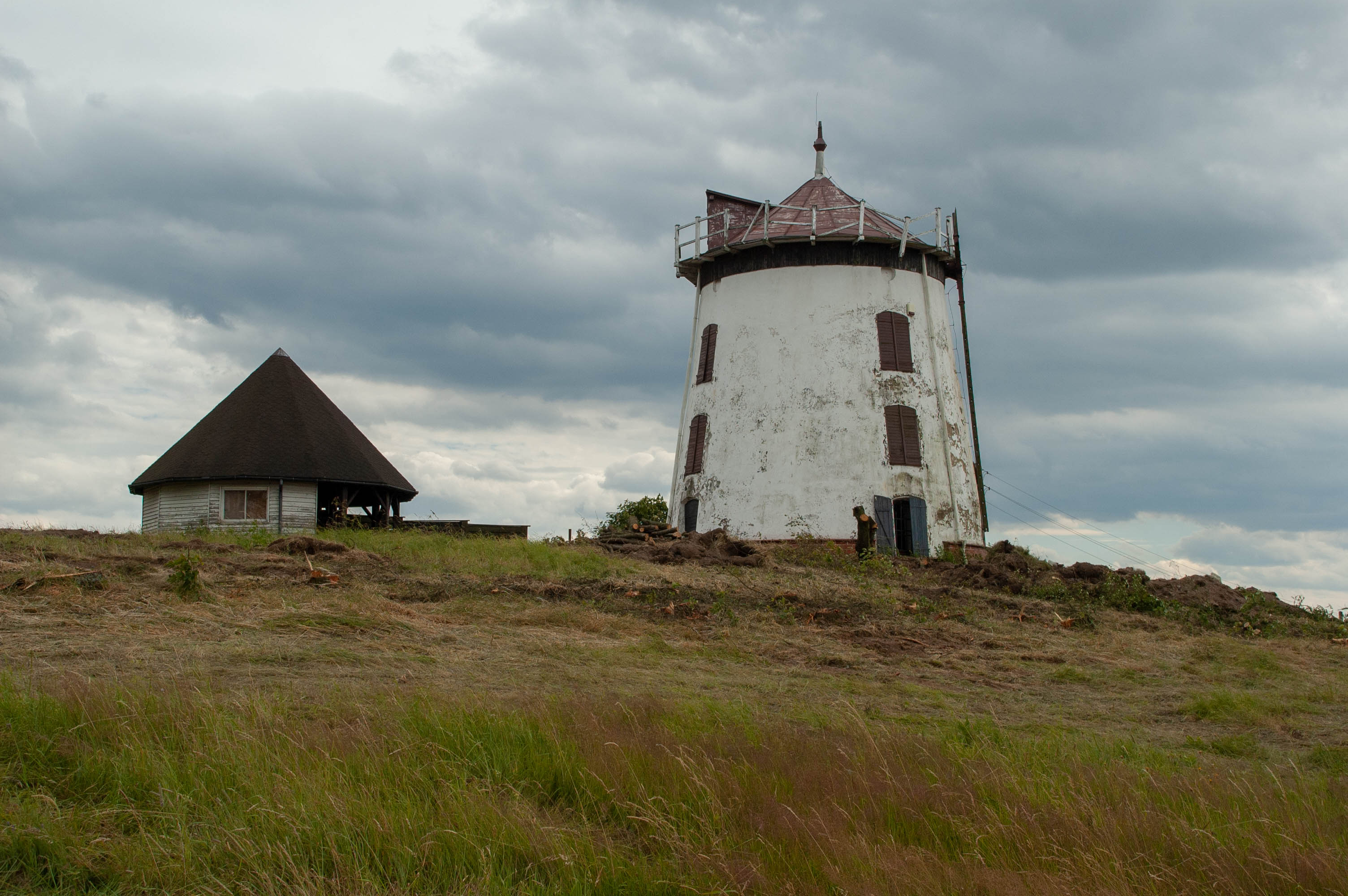
Windmill

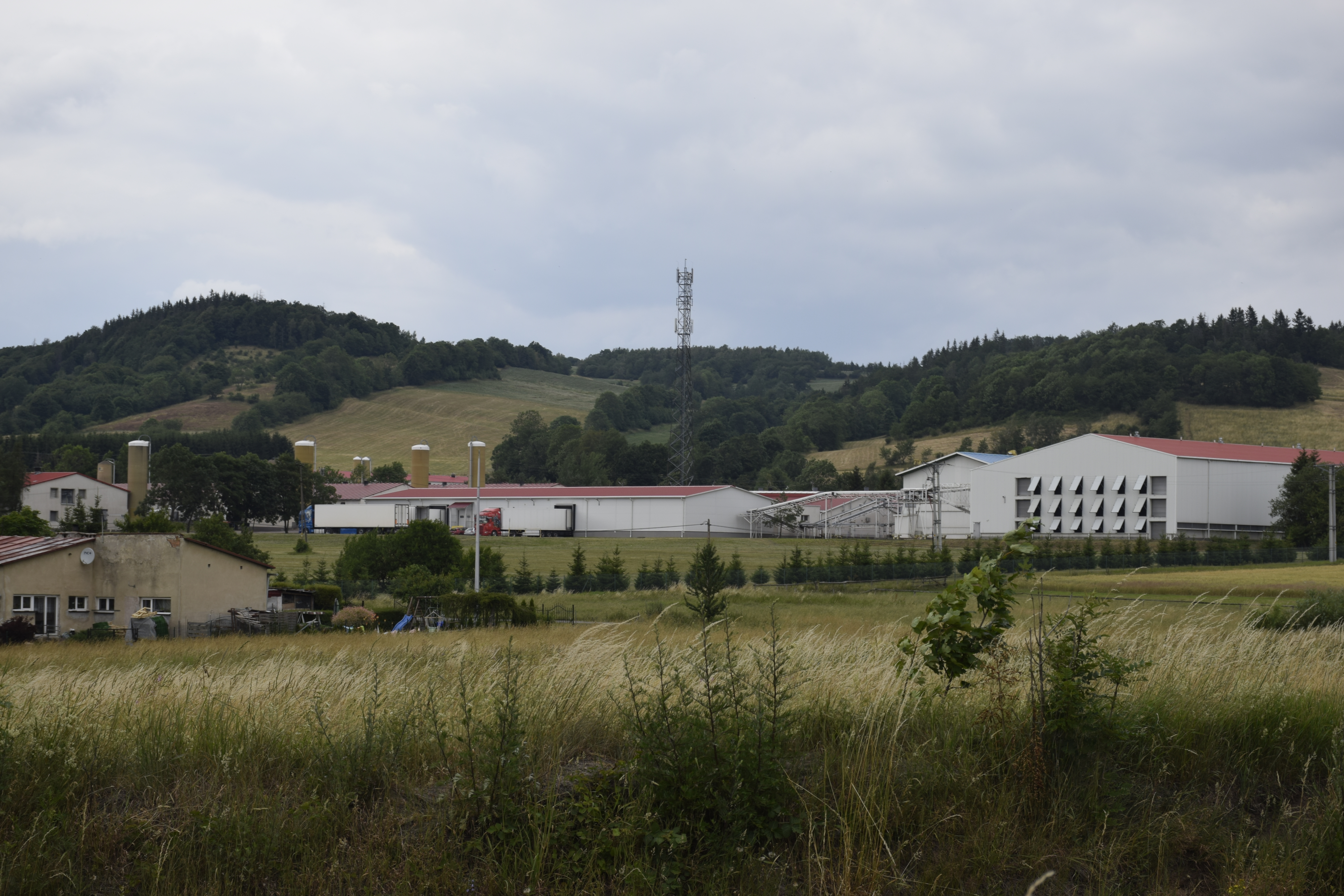
A factory

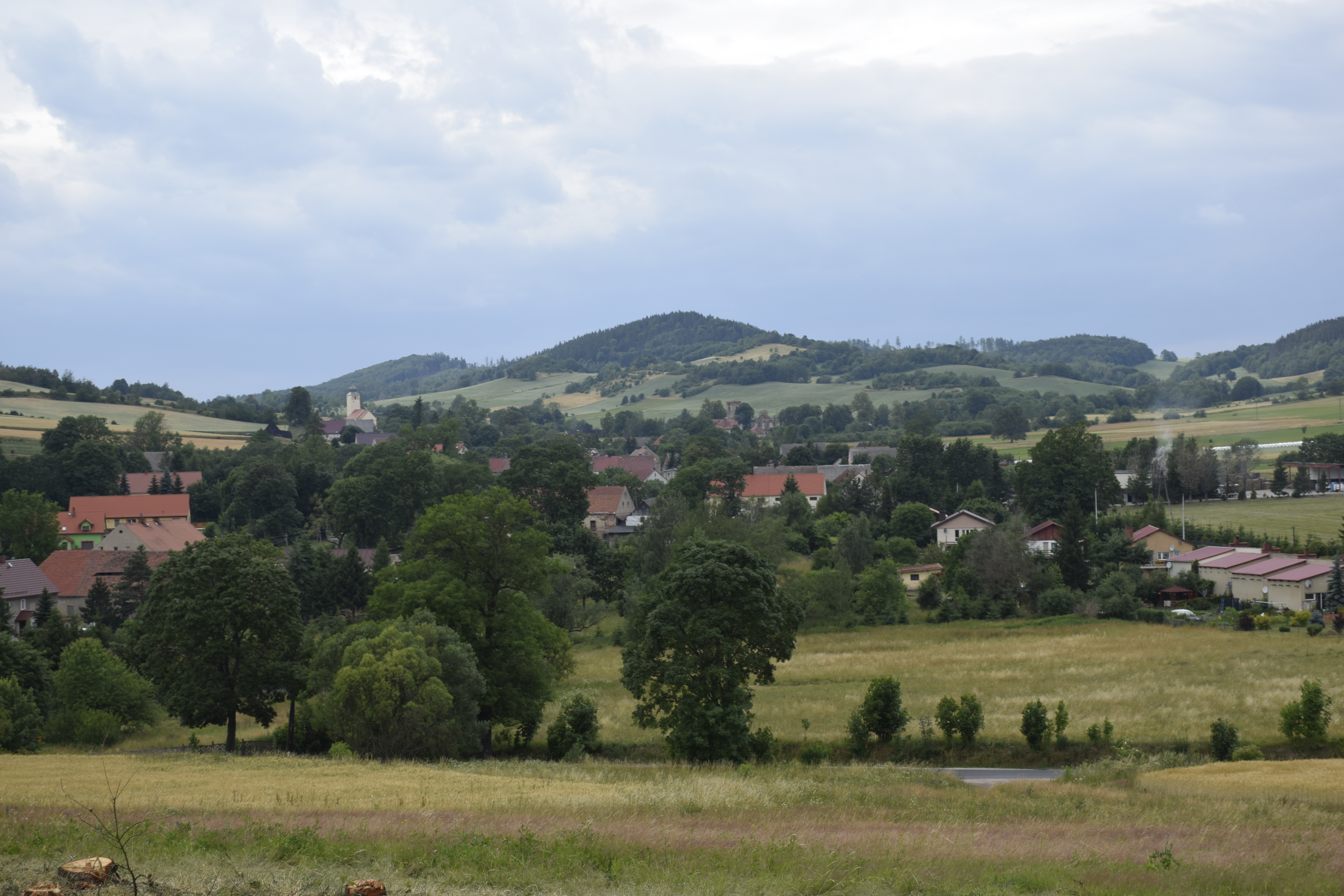
View at the village from the field

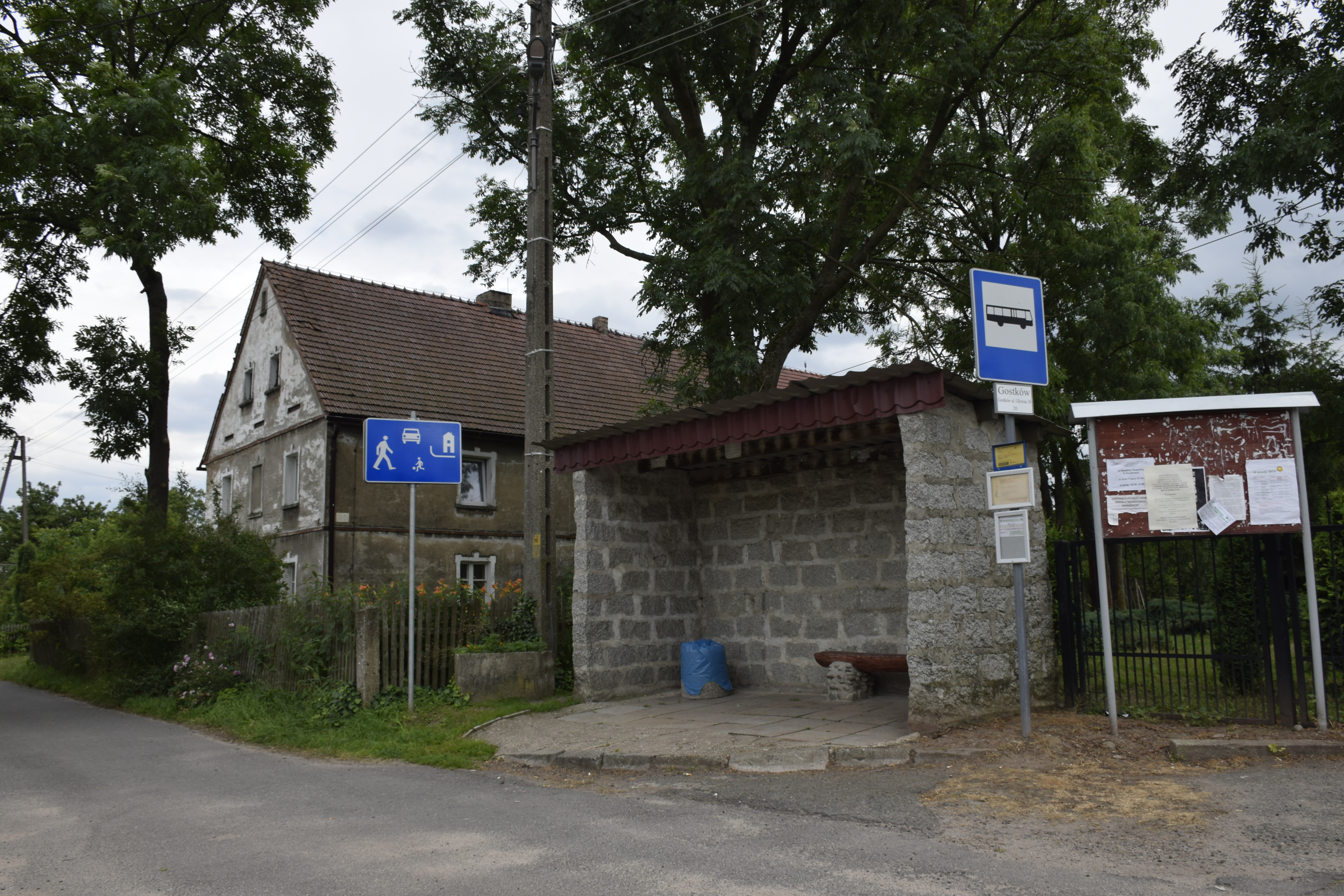
Bus stop

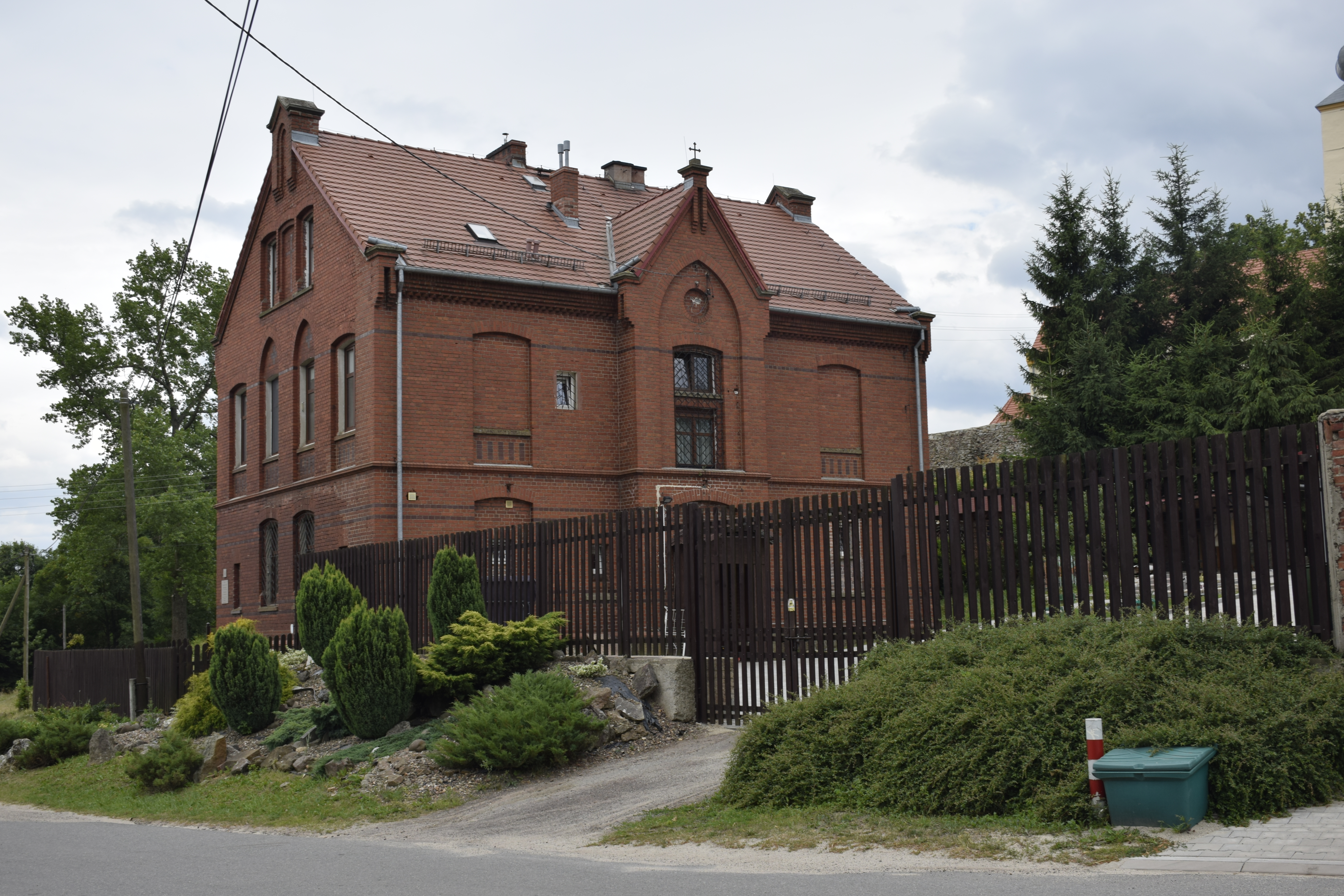
House by road
