= Aradi =

Aradi may refer to:

- Aradi (see), a diocese in the early African church
- False name assumed by János Bartl
