= Podgórna, Lower Silesian Voivodeship =

Podgórna
- Village
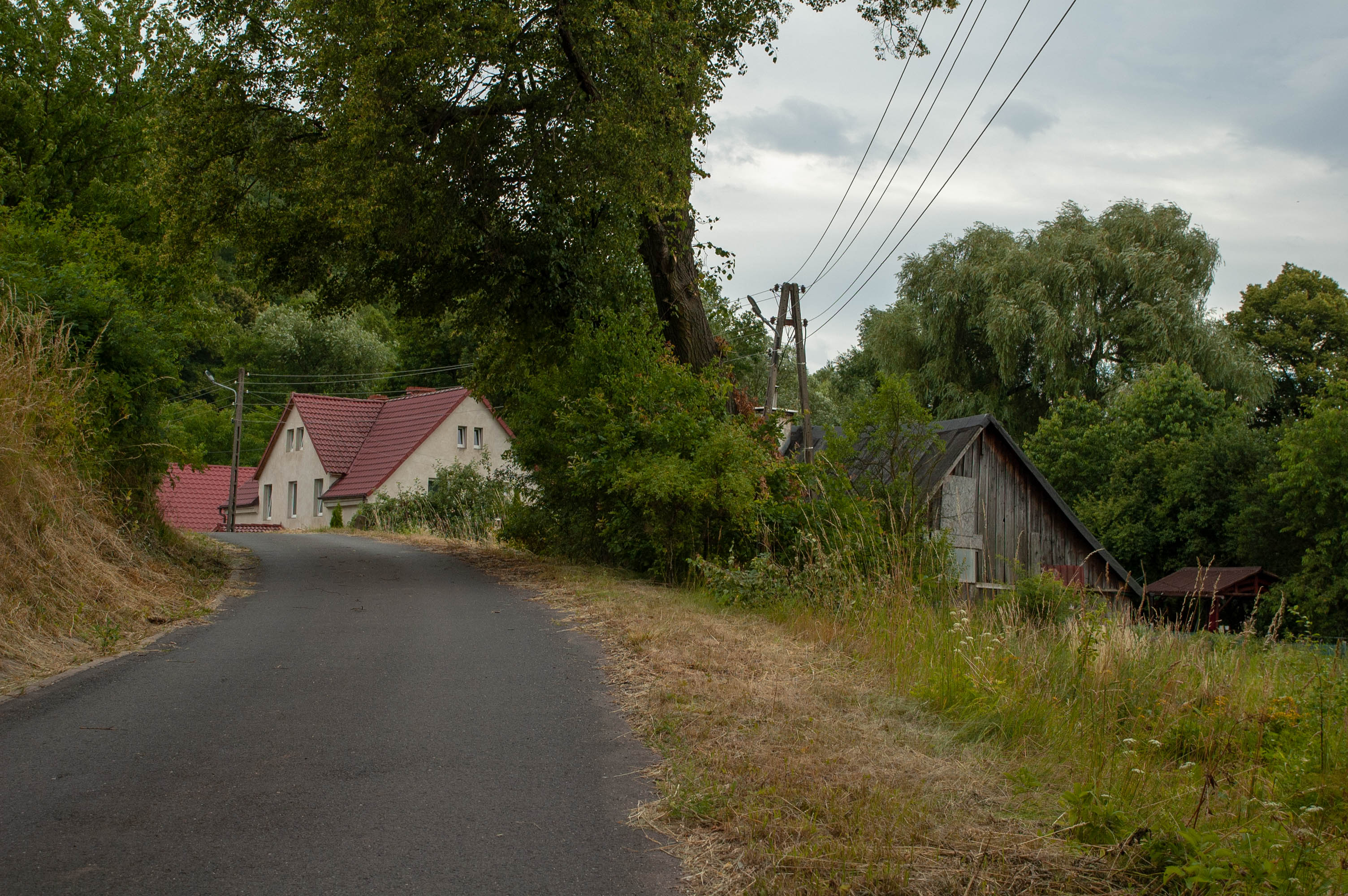
- Houses by road

- Location within Poland
- Coordinates: 50°50′24″N 16°11′37″E
- Country: Poland
- Voivodeship: Lower Silesian
- County: Wałbrzych
- Gmina: Stare Bogaczowice

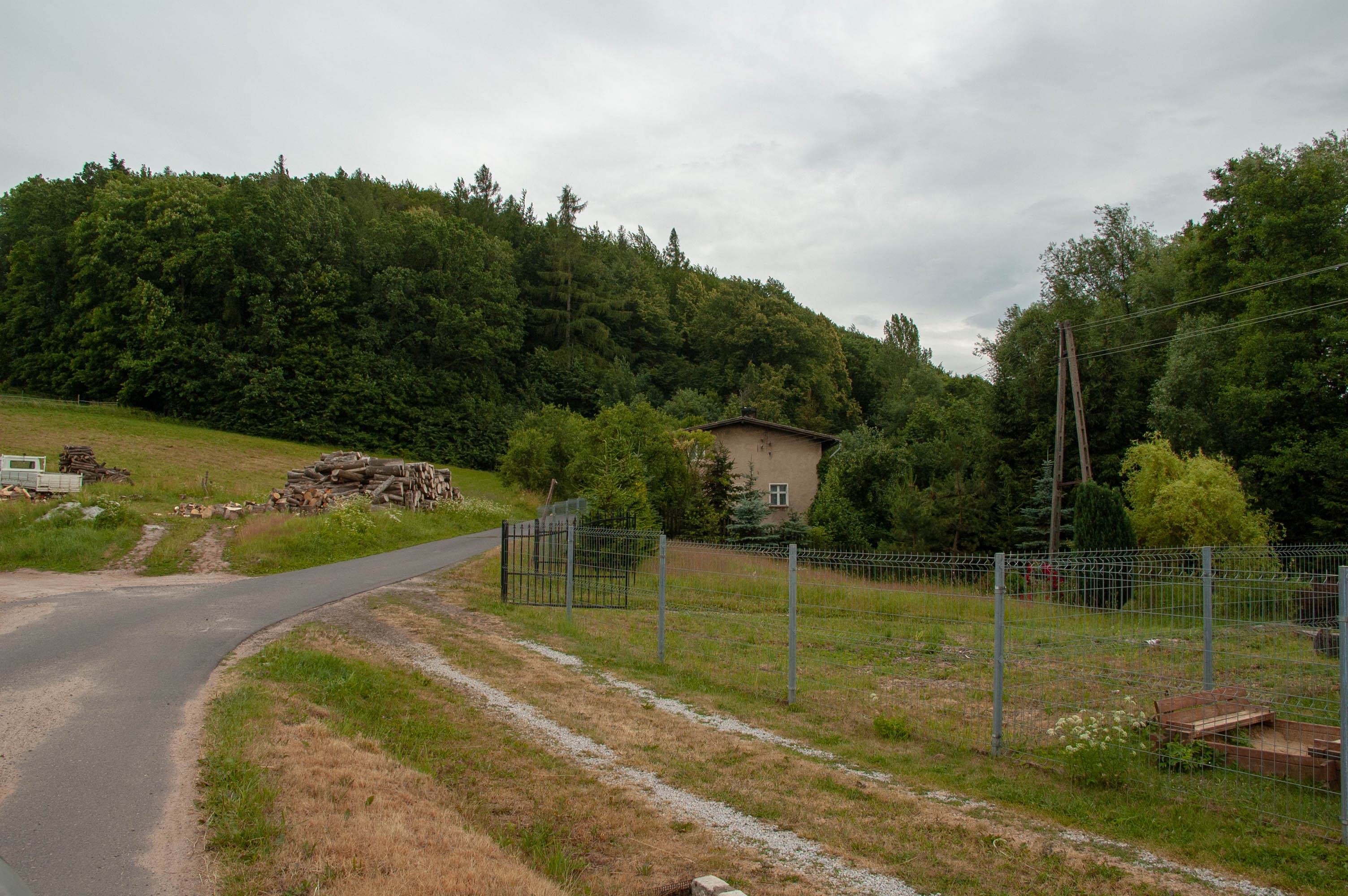
A garden in Podgórna

Podgórna [pɔdˈɡurna] is a village in the administrative district of Gmina Stare Bogaczowice, within Wałbrzych County, Lower Silesian Voivodeship, in south-western Poland.
