= Agnes Edwards (craftworker) =

Aboriginal Australian craftswoman

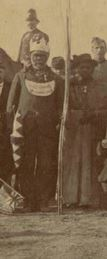
- 1902 "Crowning Ceremony" Queen Aggie
- Born: Agnes Crow c. 1873; Mellool Station, New South Wales, Australia
- Died: 1928 homestead on the Murray River, Victoria, Australia
- Occupation: craft maker
- Years active: 1897-1928
- Known for: feather flowers

Agnes Edwards, (c.1873-1928) also known as Queen Aggie was an Aboriginal Australian craftswoman who made hand-crafted goods to earn her livelihood in New South Wales and Victoria. Gathering items along the riverbanks, she fashioned them into decorative ornaments or useful items and sold them in and around Swan Hill. Widely known she was honored by several local ceremonies. Works attributed to her are featured in the Museum of Victoria in Melbourne.

== Early life ==
Agnes Crow was born about 1873 at Mellool Station, New South Wales, Australia, located between Moulamein, NSW and Swan Hill, Victoria to Sarah and Jim Crow, who was a worker at the station. They were of the Edward River Wati Wati people. Around 1890, Aggie, as she was known, married, probably in a traditional arrangement, Harry Edwards, an older Muti Muti Aborigine.

== Mid-life ==
Edwards was widely known in the area as Queen Aggie having been introduced to the governor, Lord Hopetoun, in 1897 and later shown in 1902 a photograph of her "crowning ceremony" taken near Swan Hill. After her parents died in 1898, the couple moved to a campsite about forty kilometers north of Swan Hill on the Edward River. In the area, which became known as Aggie's Swamp, they and other Aborigines operated a changing station for horses on the Cobb and Co's Balranald route. In addition, Edwards earned a living from fishing, trapping and selling eggs, as well as from handcrafted goods, which she sold on weekends in Swan Hill. Using a canoe to gather duck eggs and feathers, Edwards collected items along the banks of the Murray River.

Edwards provided feathers for the turn-of-the-century fashion trend of highly-decorative feathered hats. Her hand-made crafts included feather flowers, drawstring purses made from rat skins, reed mats, baskets and feather fishing lures. Her use of colour and sense of design and style were widely recognized, as her decorations adorned homes and became part of museum collections. Seven arrangements of feather flowers attributed to Aggie are held by the Museum of Victoria in Melbourne. Edwards maintained her independence and homestead on the Murray River until her death, though in her later years, she utilized ration distribution programs to supplement her living.

From around 1912, after Harry's death, Aggie lived alone. She and Bob Nicholls were known as partners, but each maintained their own separate living quarters.

== Death and legacy ==
Edwards died on 17 November 1928 on her homestead and was buried in Swan Hill Cemetery. The local Australian Natives' Association erected a tombstone to honor her. In 1988, to address the disparity of women's biographies in Australian history, the Australian Bicentennial Authority pressed for inclusion of more women and began collecting histories on notable women. Edwards along with other noted Australian women were featured in an article in The Age to highlight the drive.
