= Jabłów =

- Village
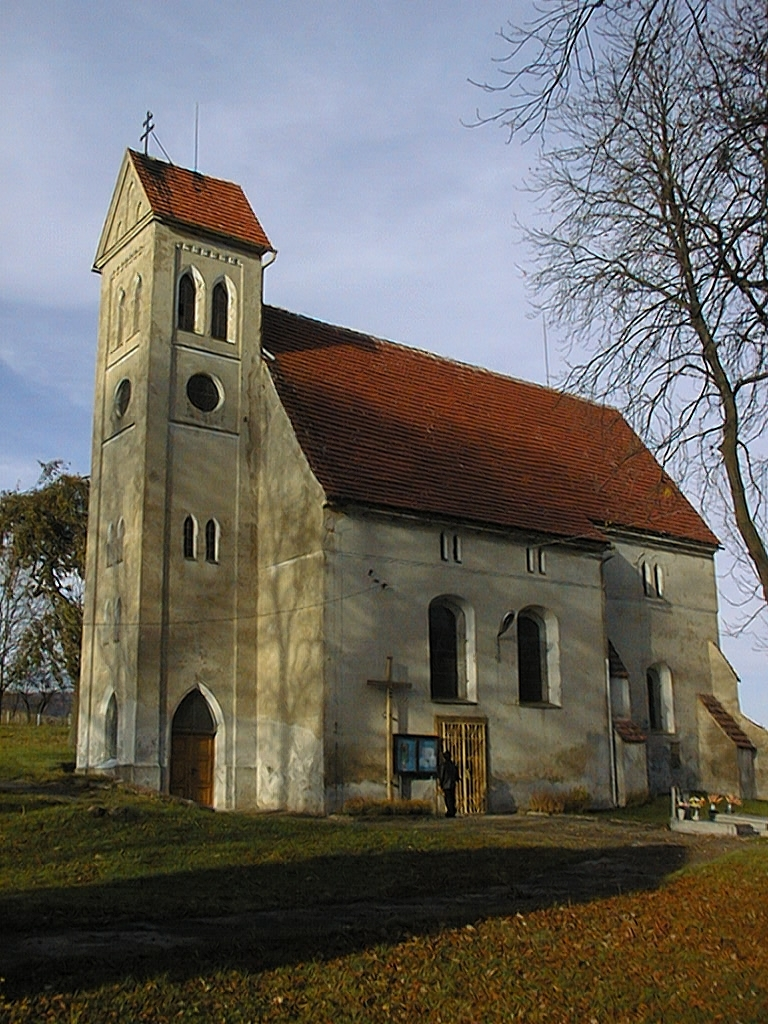
- Church

- Location within Poland
- Coordinates: 50°47′20″N 16°10′10″E
- Country: Poland
- Voivodeship: Lower Silesian
- County: Wałbrzych
- Gmina: Stare Bogaczowice

Jabłów [ˈjabwuf] is a village in the administrative district of Gmina Stare Bogaczowice, within Wałbrzych County, Lower Silesian Voivodeship, in south-western Poland.

== Gallery ==
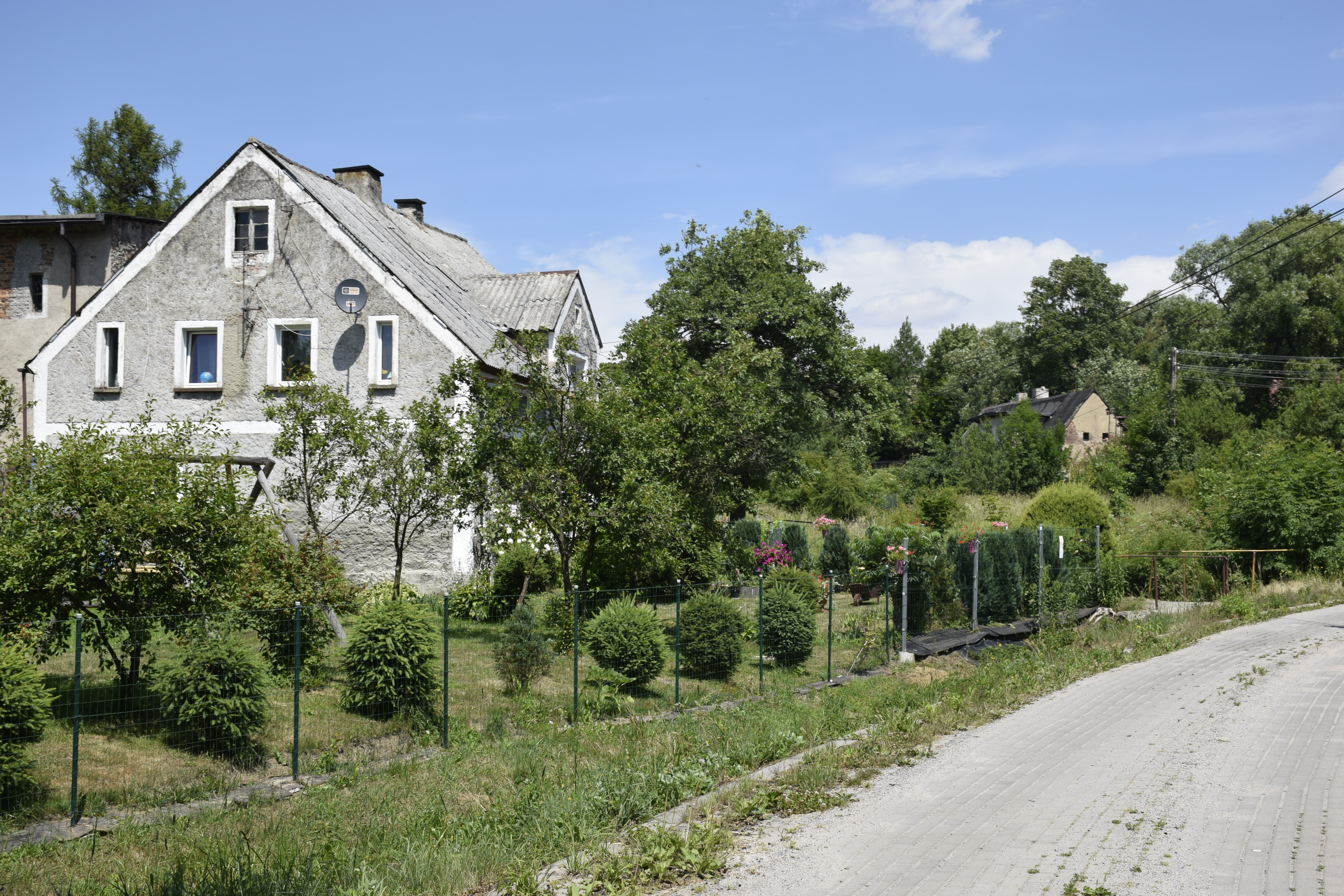
House with the garden

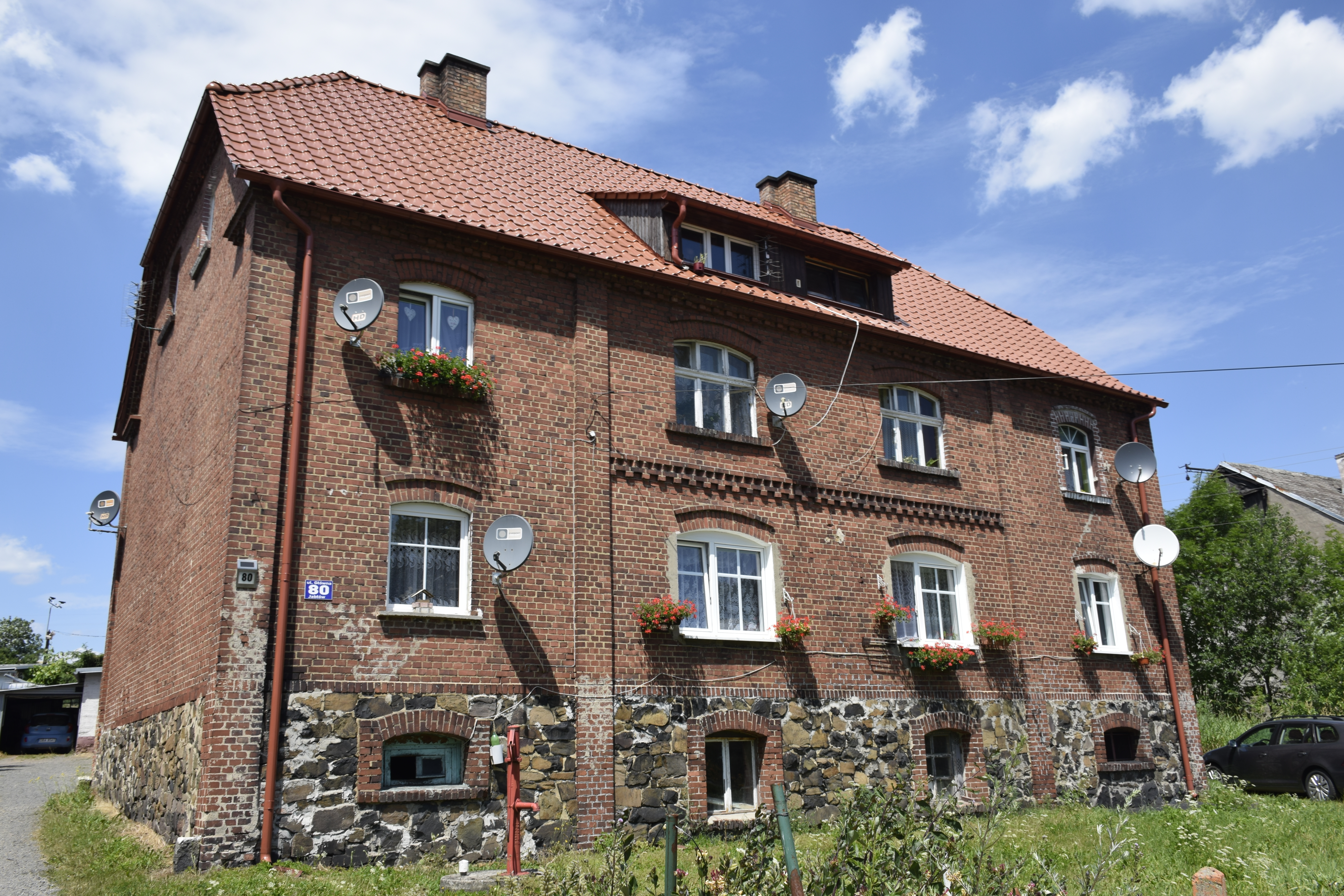
Brick house

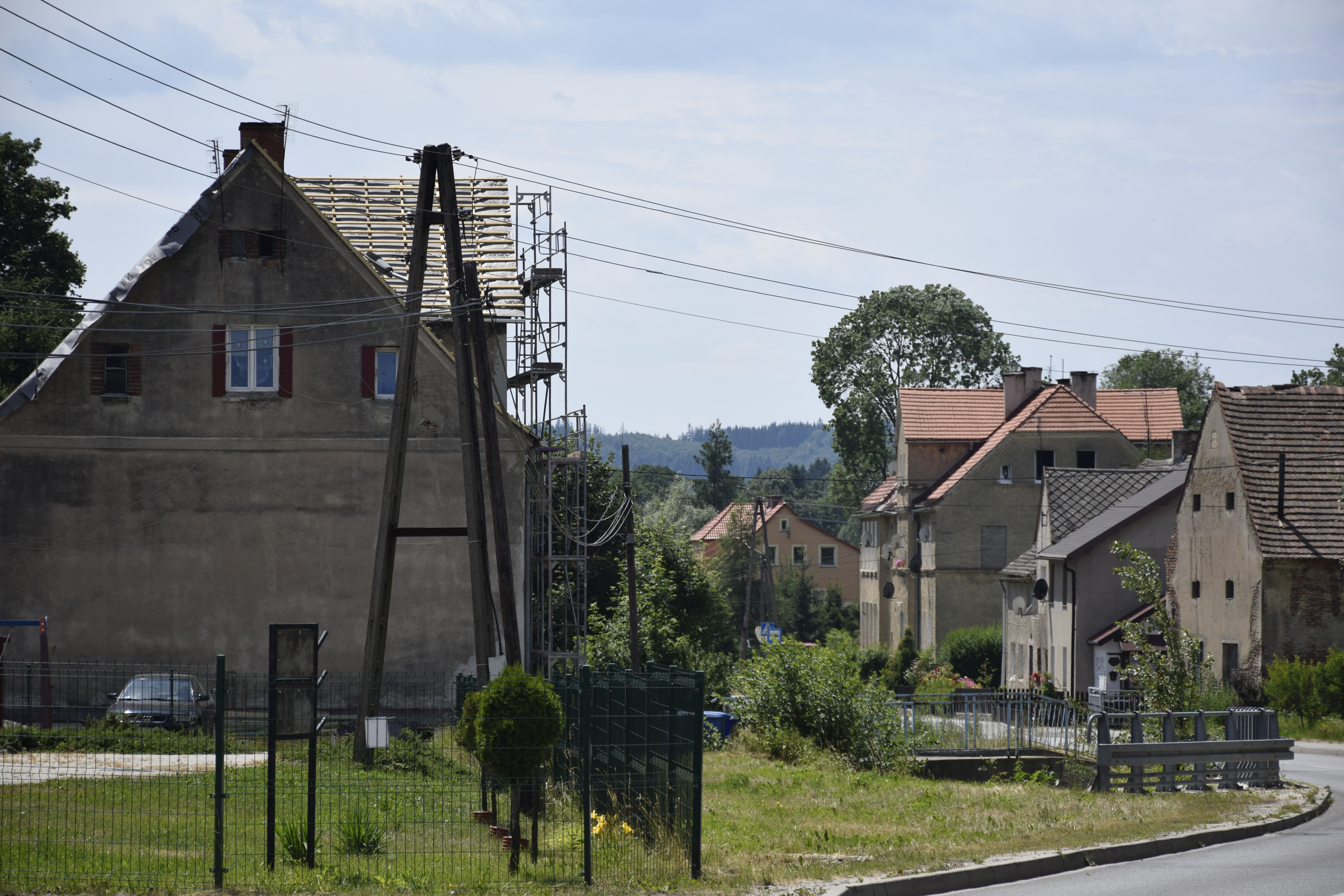
Houses by the road
