= Lubomin, Lower Silesian Voivodeship =

Lubomin
- Village
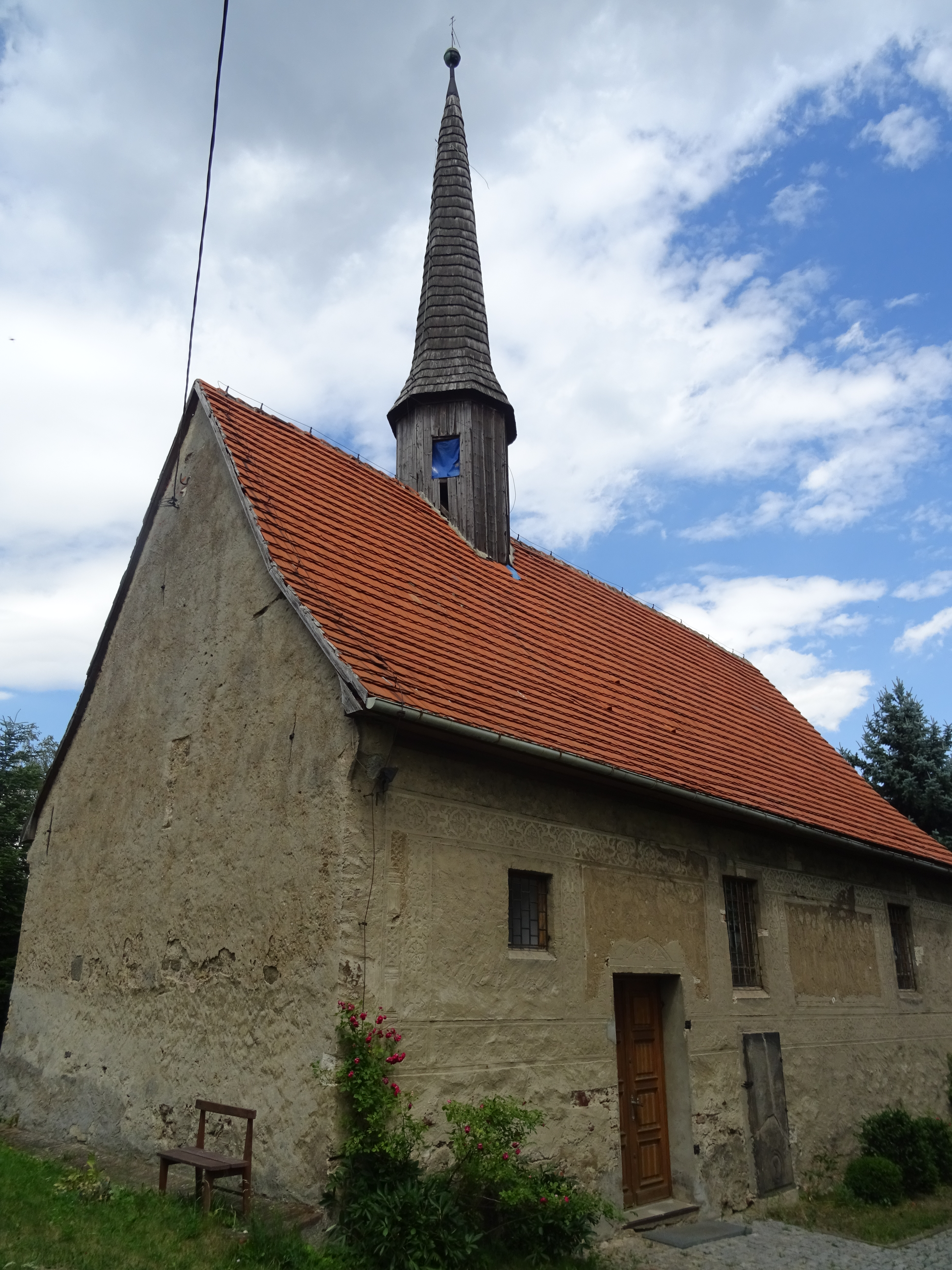
- Church

- Location within Poland
- Coordinates: 50°49′N 16°13′E
- Country: Poland
- Voivodeship: Lower Silesian
- County: Wałbrzych
- Gmina: Stare Bogaczowice

Lubomin [luˈbɔmin] is a village in the administrative district of Gmina Stare Bogaczowice, within Wałbrzych County, Lower Silesian Voivodeship, in south-western Poland.

== Galerie ==
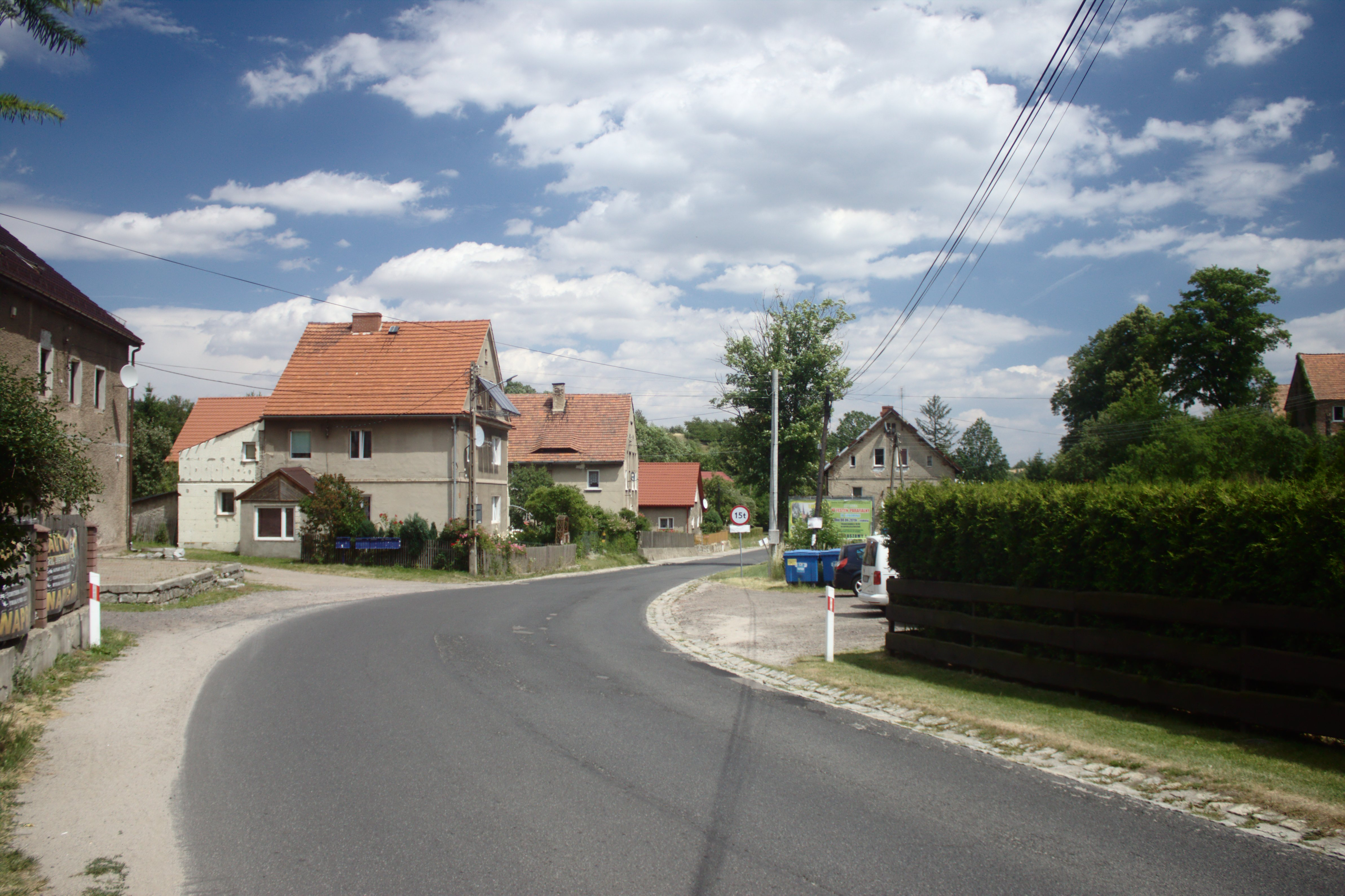
Road with houses by

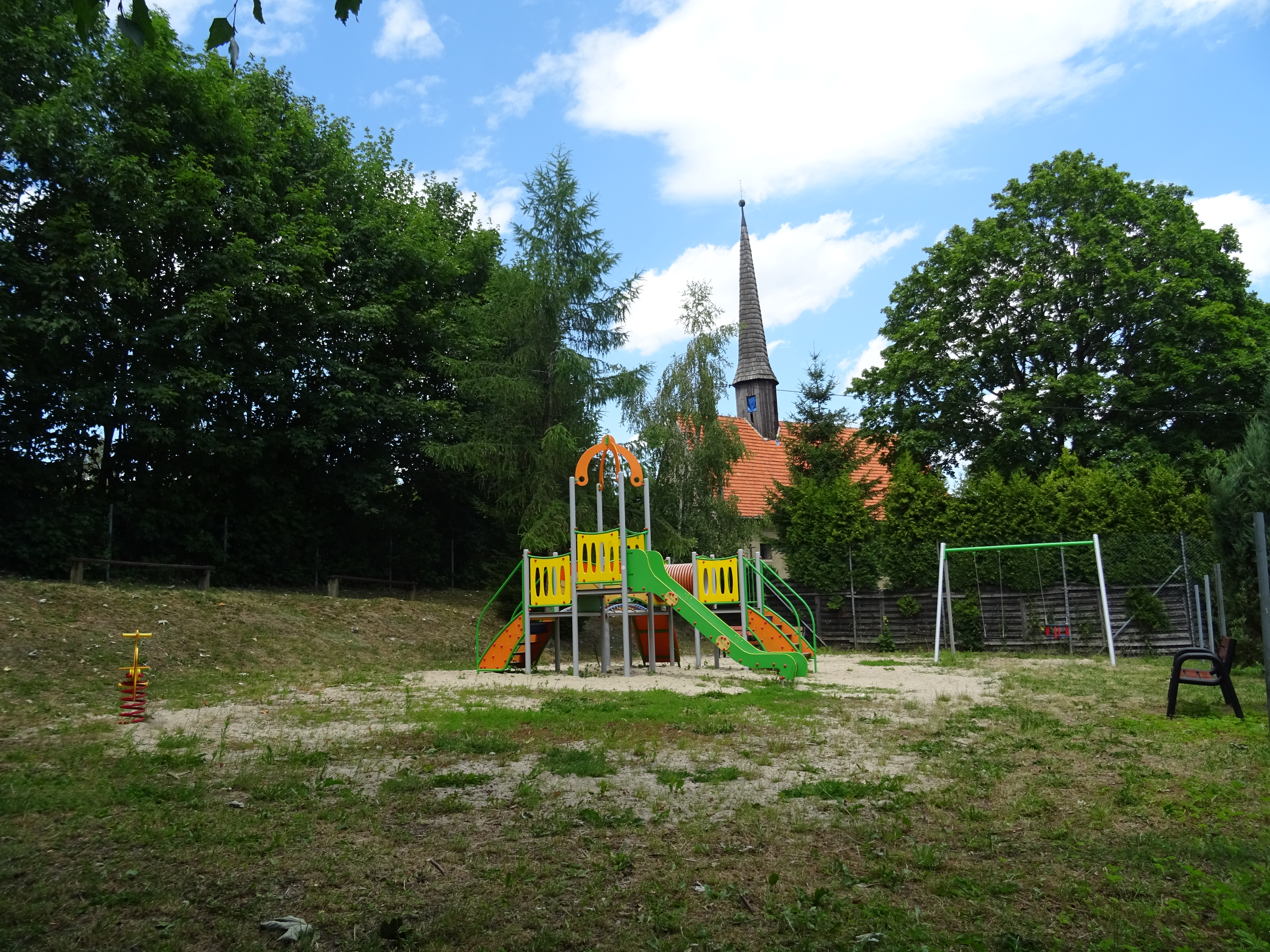
Children playground

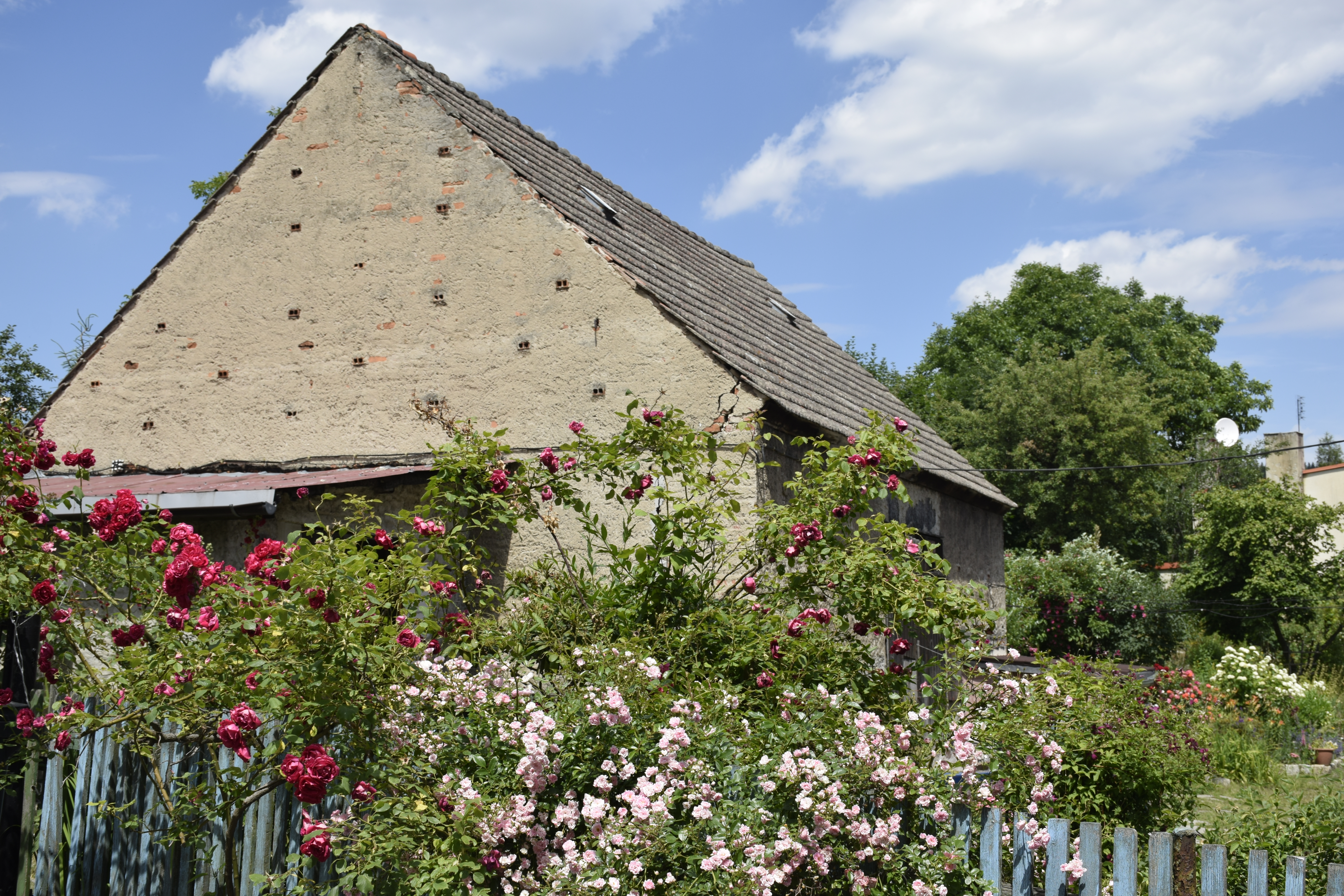
Barn in the garden
