= Cisów, Lower Silesian Voivodeship =

Cisów
- Village
- Location within Poland
- Coordinates: 50°51′23″N 16°15′48″E
- Country: Poland
- Voivodeship: Lower Silesian
- County: Wałbrzych
- Gmina: Stare Bogaczowice
- Time zone: UTC+1 (CET)
  - Summer (DST): UTC+2 (CEST)
- Vehicle registration: DBA

Cisów [ˈt͡ɕisuf] is a village in the administrative district of Gmina Stare Bogaczowice, within Wałbrzych County, Lower Silesian Voivodeship, in south-western Poland.

During the Seven Years' War, in 1757, Hussars and Pandurs of Austria were stationed in the settlement.
