= Stare Bogaczowice =

- Village
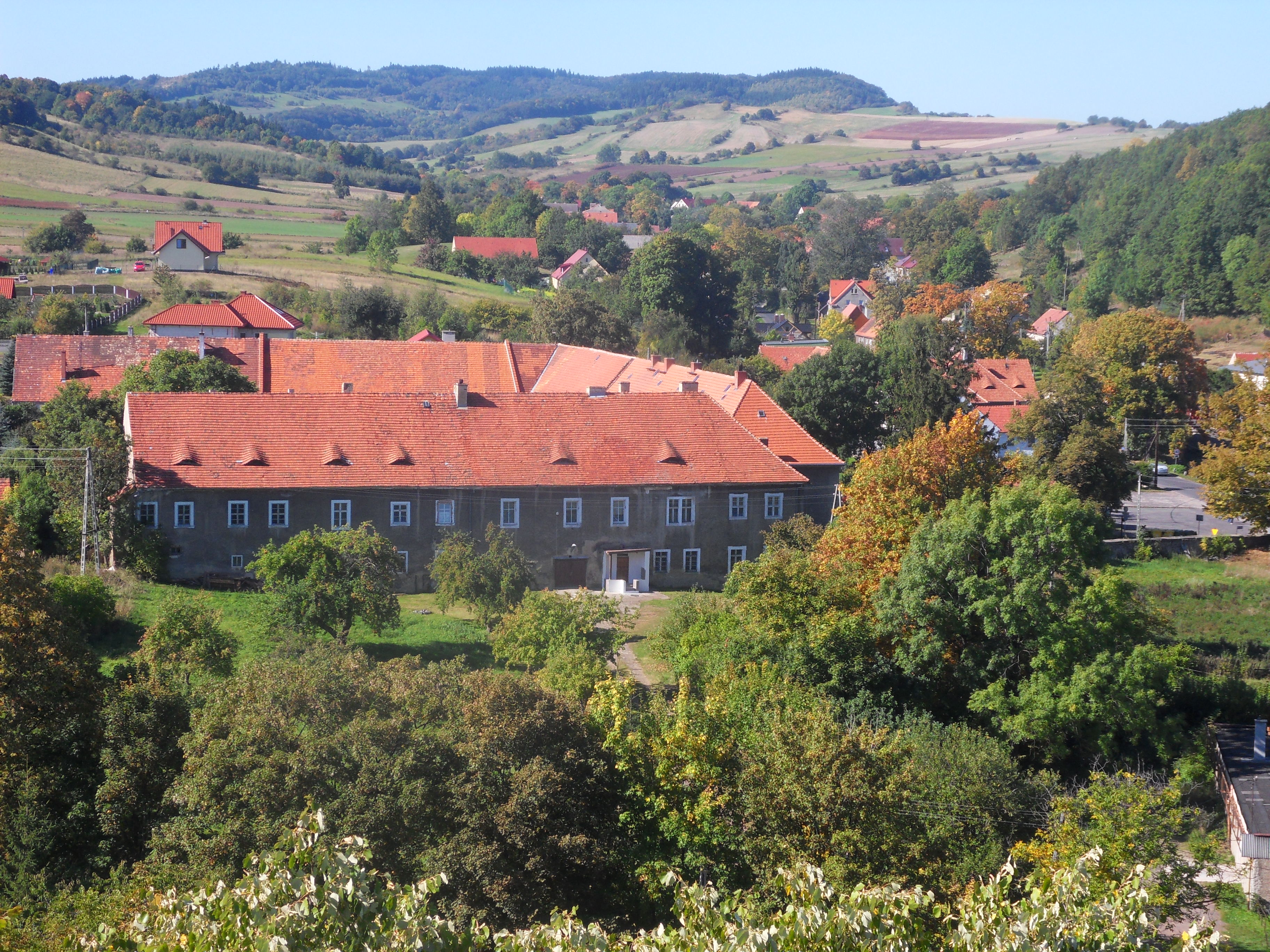
- Cistercian abbey in the village

- Location within Poland
- Coordinates: 50°51′N 16°10′E
- Country: Poland
- Voivodeship: Lower Silesian
- County: Wałbrzych
- Gmina: Stare Bogaczowice
- Population: 1,450

Stare Bogaczowice [ˈstarɛ bɔɡat͡ʂɔˈvit͡sɛ] is a village in Wałbrzych County, Lower Silesian Voivodeship, in southwestern Poland. It is the seat of the administrative district (gmina) called Gmina Stare Bogaczowice.

== Notable people ==
- Dinardi, German stage magician
