= Dinardi =

German magician (1911–1996)

- Born: Alfred Körber; 18 June 1911; Altreichenau, Prussia
- Died: 3 October 1996 (aged 85)
- Occupation: Magician
- Spouse: Anni Körber

Alfred Körber (18 June 1911 – 3 October 1996), known by his stage name Rolf Dinardi (or simply Dinardi) was a German magician best known for his performances with feather flowers.

== Biography ==
Körber was apprenticed as a baker and confectioner from a young age. He was introduced to magic by a stage hypnotist by the name of Rolf Dinardi and, after the latter's death, obtained permission to perform under that name. His first public show was on 6 January 1939, using props obtained from János Bartl.

Dinardi met his future wife, a stage performer named Anni, at a travelling circus in Gladbeck, and they married in 1944. The Second World War prevented them from performing together until 1946.

Dinardi was best known for his performances with springed feather flowers, which he would produce in tremendous quantities from a box that seemed too small to contain them all. The lush, realistic-looking bouquets were manufactured by Dinardi himself using dyed chicken feathers.

Dinardi was recognized as Magician of the Year for 1989/1990 by the Magischer Zirkel von Deutschland, the magicians' association of West Germany.
