= Cieszów, Lower Silesian Voivodeship =

Cieszów
- Village
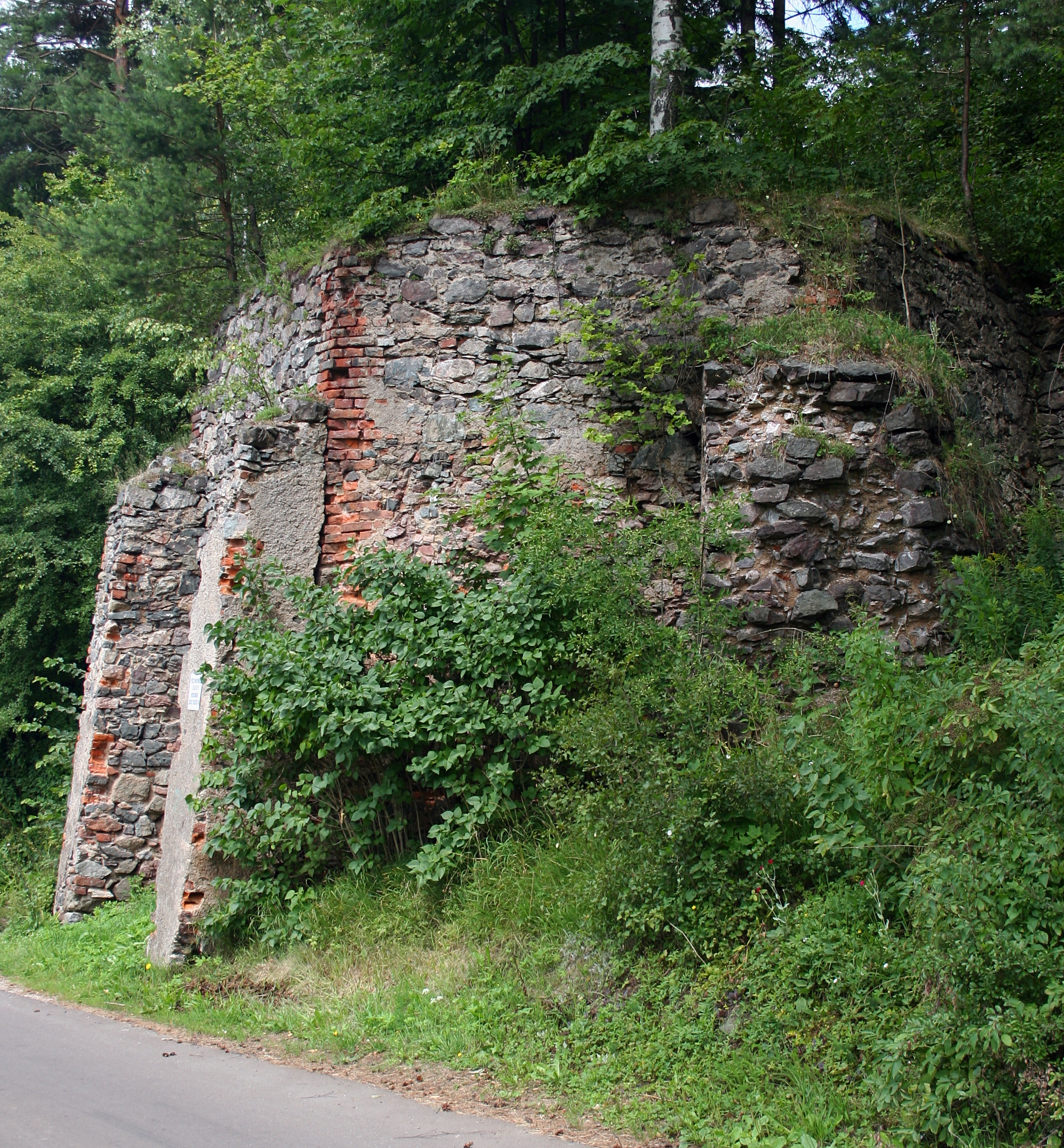
- Ruina pieca wapienniczego w Cieszowie2 25.07.2011

- Location within Poland
- Coordinates: 50°51′54″N 16°15′39″E
- Country: Poland
- Voivodeship: Lower Silesian
- County: Wałbrzych
- Gmina: Stare Bogaczowice

Cieszów [ˈt͡ɕɛʂuf] (German: Fröhlichsdorf) is a village in the administrative district of Gmina Stare Bogaczowice, within Wałbrzych County, Lower Silesian Voivodeship, in south-western Poland.
