= Gmina Stare Bogaczowice =

Gmina Stare Bogaczowice Stare Bogaczowice Commune
- Gmina
- Coat of arms
- Interactive map of Gmina Stare Bogaczowice
- Coordinates (Stare Bogaczowice): 50°51′N 16°10′E
- Country: Poland
- Voivodeship: Lower Silesian
- County: Wałbrzych
- Seat: Stare Bogaczowice
- Sołectwos: Chwaliszów, Cieszów, Gostków, Jabłów, Lubomin, Nowe Bogaczowice, Stare Bogaczowice, Struga

Area
  - Total: 86.89 km^{2} (33.55 sq mi)

Population (2019-06-30)
  - Total: 4,297
  - Density: 49.45/km^{2} (128.1/sq mi)
- Website: https://www.starebogaczowice.ug.gov.pl

Gmina Stare Bogaczowice is a rural gmina (administrative district) in Wałbrzych County, Lower Silesian Voivodeship, in south-western Poland. Its seat is the village of Stare Bogaczowice, which lies approximately 12 kilometres (7 mi) north-west of Wałbrzych, and 69 kilometres (43 mi) south-west of the regional capital Wrocław.

The gmina covers an area of 86.89 square kilometres (33.5 sq mi), and as of 2019 its total population is 4,297.

== Neighbouring gminas ==
Gmina Stare Bogaczowice is bordered by the towns of Boguszów-Gorce, Świebodzice, Szczawno-Zdrój and Wałbrzych, and the gminas of Bolków, Czarny Bór, Dobromierz and Marciszów.

== Villages ==
The gmina contains the villages of Chwaliszów, Cieszów, Cisów, Gostków, Jabłów, Lubomin, Nowe Bogaczowice, Podgórna, Stare Bogaczowice, Struga and Wrony.
