= János Bartl =

- Born: 13 April 1878; Nagybecskerek, Austria-Hungary
- Died: 27 September 1958 (aged 80); Hamburg, West Germany
- Occupation: Magician

János Bartl (1878–1958), a descendant of a German craftsman family which had emigrated to Hungary, was one of the most important magic supply dealers of the pre-war era.

== Biography ==
His parents called him Johann, but on his Hungarian birth certificate it said János. After attending school, he learned the craft of book-binding in his home town. As a journeyman he worked in Budapest, Vienna, Dresden, Munich, and Hamburg in large workshops. By 1902 Bartl was employed as a book cover gilder.

He studied magic books in his free time and by 1909 he was performing professionally. He travelled predominantly through German towns under the name of "Aradi" and later under his own name. Around 1910 he opened a magic school, which called "Academy for Modern Magic Art", but it was apparently not very successful. A short time after the family arrival in Hamburg, they rented several rooms in an adjacent house for the production and sale of magic items. The store took off quickly offering not only magic tricks and books but also gag gifts, puzzle games, fireworks, and picture postcards.

From 1919 to 1924, he joined Carl Willmann in the Vereinigte Zauberapparate Fabrik Bartl & Willmann (United Magic Instruments Factory of Bartl & Willmann). Bartl was still offering Willmann's products for years afterwards in his sale lists. Bartl shipped his products to all parts of the world. Dinardi and Okito, among others, used Bartl's inventions.
