= Feather flowers =

Artificial flowers created using feathers

Feather flowers are artificial flowers created using feathers that are dyed, cut and shaped to resemble petals. Some artists are able to create very realistic looking flowers and leaves using feathers.

Feather flowers can be created with goose nagoire feather or peacock strands. Goose nagoire are one of the most popular to create with, because they are easy to cut and shape.

== History ==
The art of creating feather flowers was mentioned as early as 1873 in a book called Art Recreations published by Shepard and Gill in Boston.

== Mythology ==
The name of Xochiquetzal, the Aztec god of beauty, sexual love, and household arts, is translated from Nahuatl as "Precious Feather Flower".

== See also ==
- Dinardi, stage magician famous for his performances with feather flowers
