= Szczawno-Zdrój =

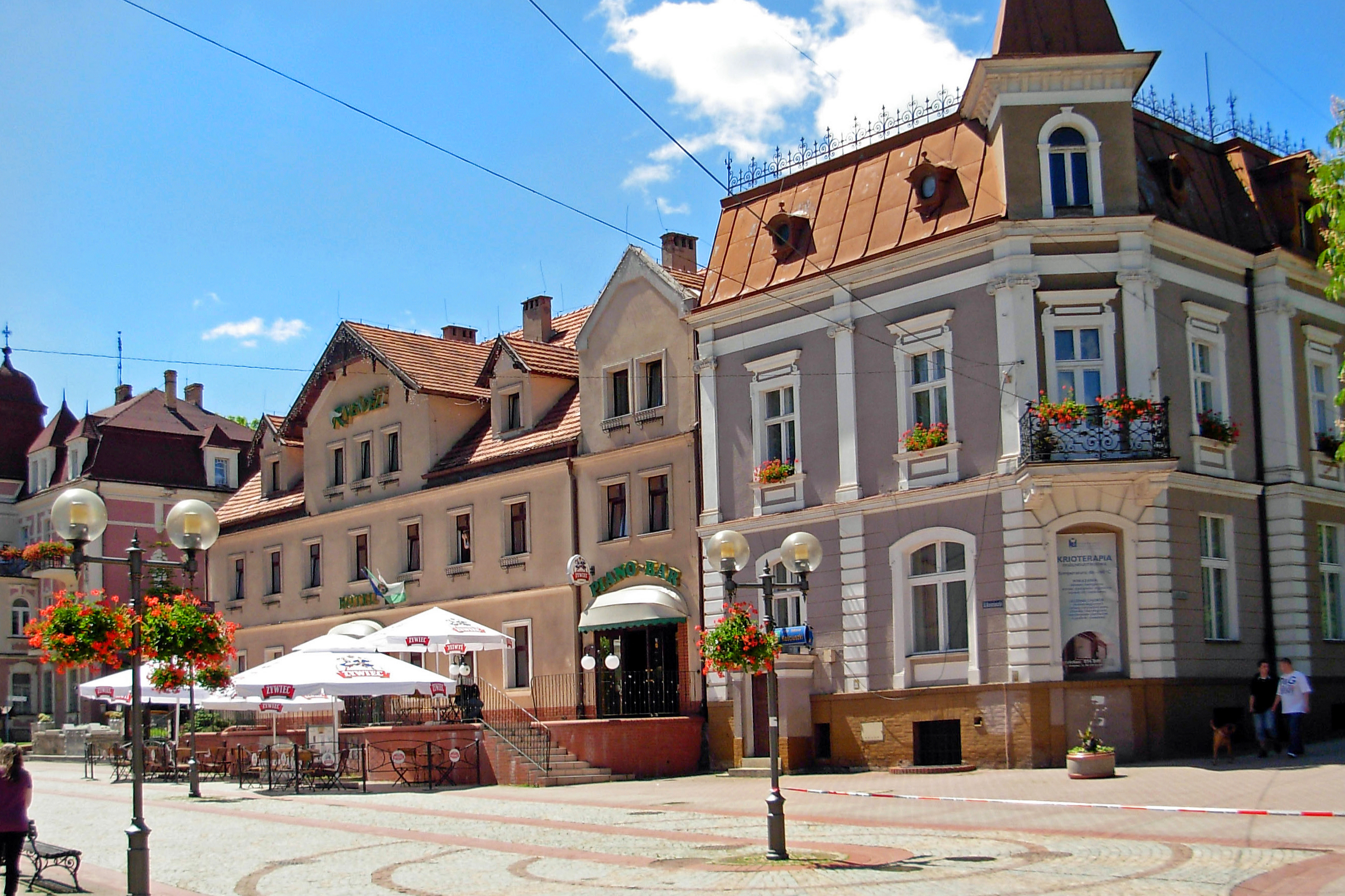
- Szczawno-Zdrój

- Flag Coat of arms

- Location within Poland
- Coordinates: 50°47′58″N 16°15′18″E
- Country: Poland
- Voivodeship: Lower Silesian
- County: Wałbrzych
- Gmina: Szczawno-Zdrój (urban gmina)
- Town rights: 1945

Area
  - Total: 14.74 km^{2} (5.69 sq mi)
- Highest elevation: 430 m (1,410 ft)
- Lowest elevation: 400 m (1,300 ft)

Population (2019-06-30)
  - Total: 5,608
  - Density: 380.5/km^{2} (985.4/sq mi)
- Time zone: UTC+1 (CET)
  - Summer (DST): UTC+2 (CEST)
- Postal code: 58-310
- Area code: (+48) 74
- Vehicle registration: DBA
- Website: http://www.szczawno-zdroj.pl

Szczawno-Zdrój [ˈʂt͡ʂavnɔ ˈzdrui̯] (German: Bad Salzbrunn, until 1935 Ober Salzbrunn) is a spa town in Wałbrzych County, Lower Silesian Voivodeship, in south-western Poland.

== Geography ==
The town in the historic Lower Silesia region is situated north of the Central Sudetes mountains, approximately 3 km (2 mi) north-west of Wałbrzych and 66 km (41 mi) south-west of the regional capital Wrocław.

Szczawno-Zdrój borders the city of Wałbrzych to the east and the town of Boguszów-Gorce to the south.

As of 2019, the town has a population of 5,608.

== History ==
The area was settled in the course of the clearing of the former Silesian Przesieka borderland. A place called Salzborn was first mentioned in a 1221 deed, from the 14th century two settlements, Nieder ("Lower") and Ober ("Upper") Salzbrunn are documented. The parish church and a hospital at Nieder Salzbrunn were probably established by the Piast duke Henry I the Bearded after 1200, benefitting from the healing spring at Ober Salzbrunn first mentioned in 1385. As a result of the fragmentation of Poland into smaller duchies, it was part of the Duchy of Silesia and later the Duchy of Jawor. Together with the Silesian Duchy of Jawor-Świdnica it fell to the Bohemian Crown after the death of Duke Bolko II the Small in 1368, held by his widow Agnes of Habsburg until 1392.

Ruled by Bohemian governors residing at Książ (Fürstenstein) Castle, the area was devastated during the Thirty Years' War. It was annexed by the Prussian king Frederick the Great after the First Silesian War in 1742. In 1807, during the Napoleonic Wars, the Battle of Struga took place nearby, in which the Poles defeated a much larger Prussian army.

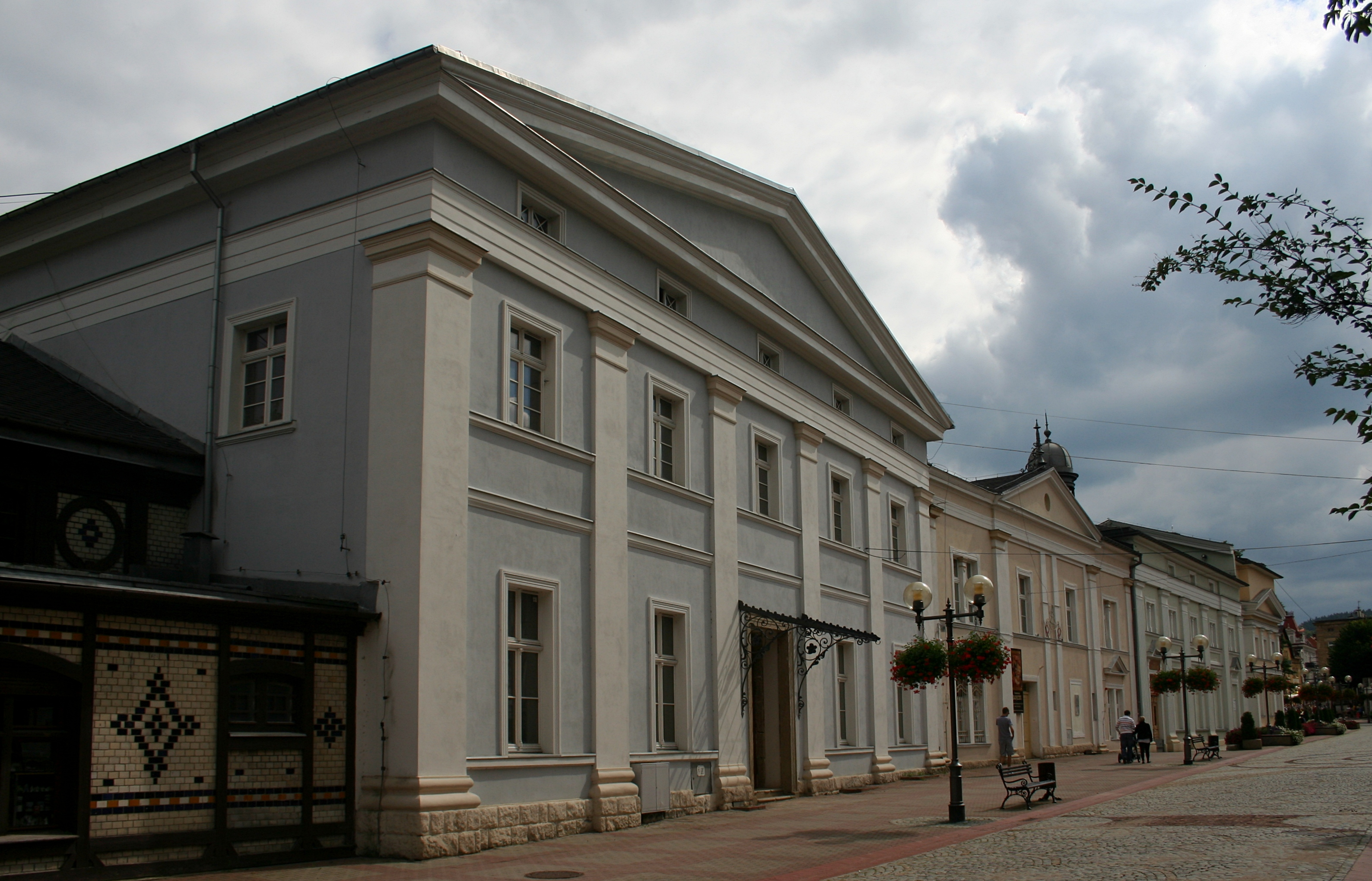
The Zdrojowy Theater hosts the annual International Wieniawski Festival

Since the 19th century the spa was very popular among the Polish cultural elite. Among its guests were poets Zygmunt Krasiński, Teofil Lenartowicz, Lucjan Siemieński and Narcyza Żmichowska, composer and virtuoso violinist Karol Lipiński, philosopher August Cieszkowski and the inventor of Esperanto L. L. Zamenhof. In 1855 and 1857, one of the greatest Polish violinists Henryk Wieniawski visited the spa and played concerts here. From 1966, the city hosts the annual International Wieniawski Festival. Among famous guests of other nationalities were King Constantine I of Greece and British politician Winston Churchill. In 1896 a new Spa Theater was built, after World War II named after Henryk Wieniawski.

In 1935 Ober Salzbrunn was officially acknowledged as a spa town and renamed Bad Salzbrunn.

At the end of World War II, the town was occupied by Red Army forces in the course of the Vistula–Oder Offensive. It became part of the Republic of Poland after the territorial changes after World War 2; subsequently, its German population was expelled. In 1945 Szczawno-Zdrój was granted town rights.

== Notable people ==
- Gerhart Hauptmann (1862–1946), playwright and writer, Nobel laureate in literature for the year 1912
- Clytus Gottwald (1925–2023), composer, conductor, and musicologist

== Surroundings ==
- Historical city of Kłodzko with its houses from 15th and 16th century
- Gola Dzierżoniowska Castle
- Medieval town of Niemcza
- Cistercian monastery at Henryków
- Wojsławice Arboretum

== Gallery ==
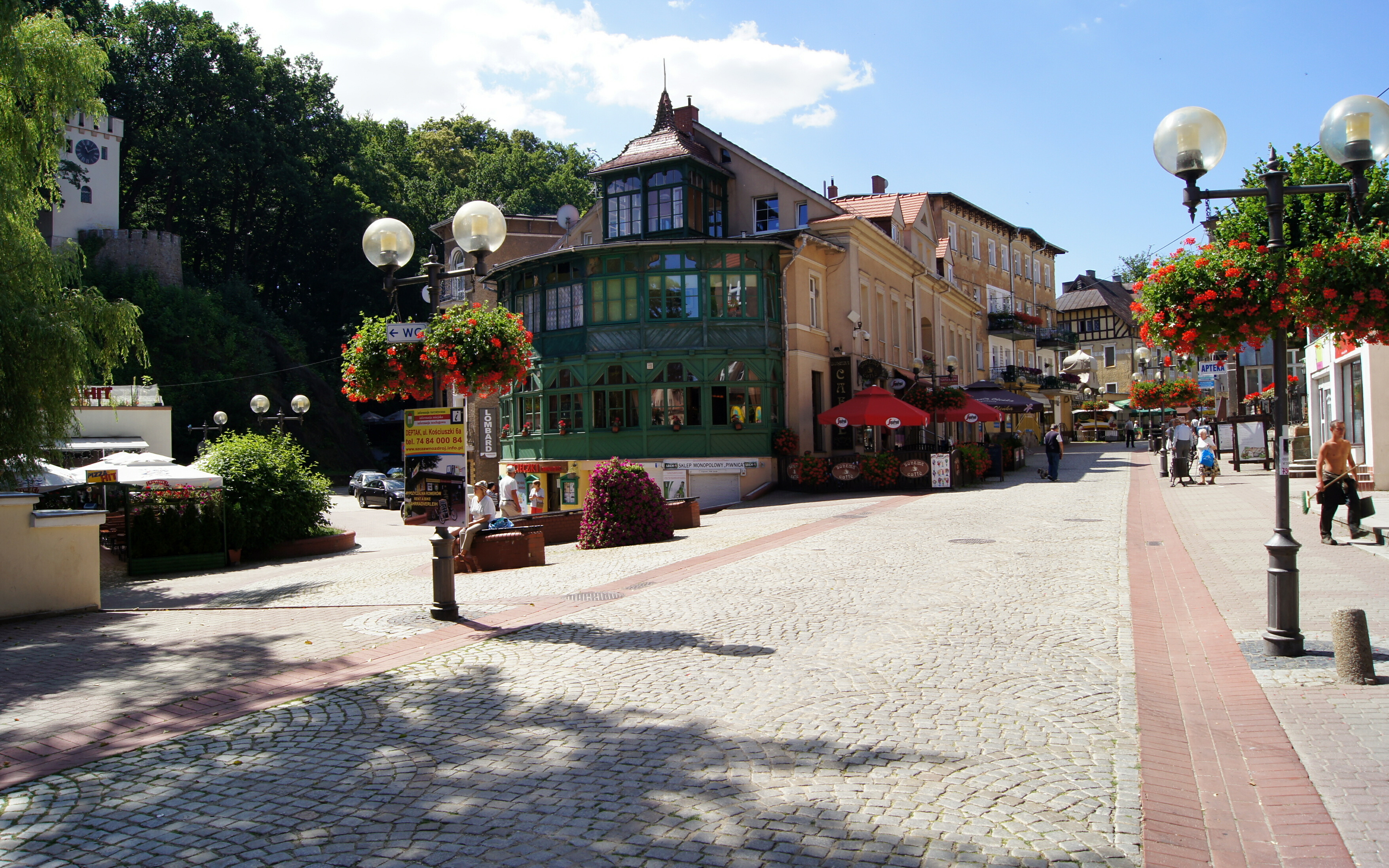
Kościuszki Street

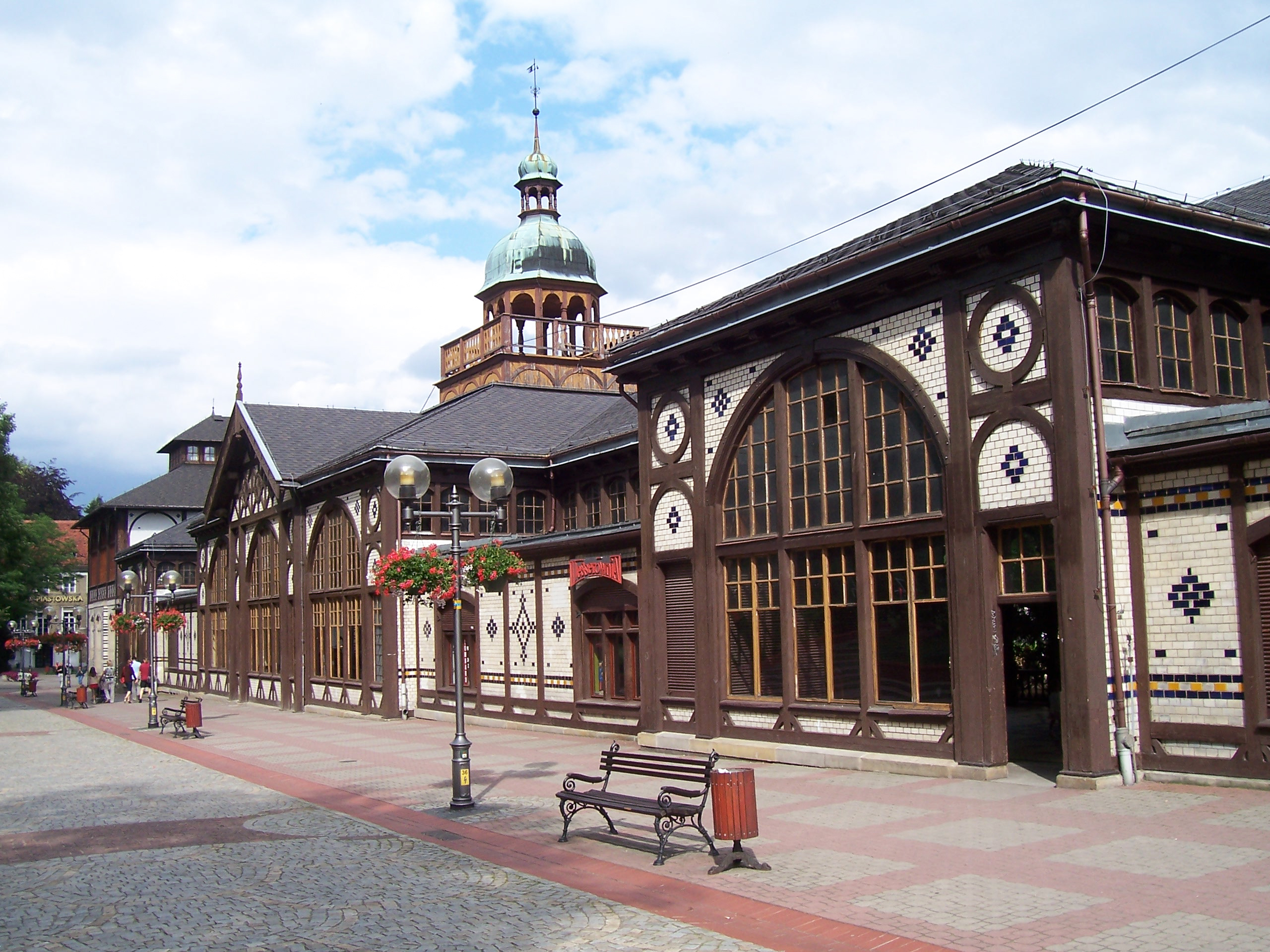
Spa house rebuilt in 1968-1974

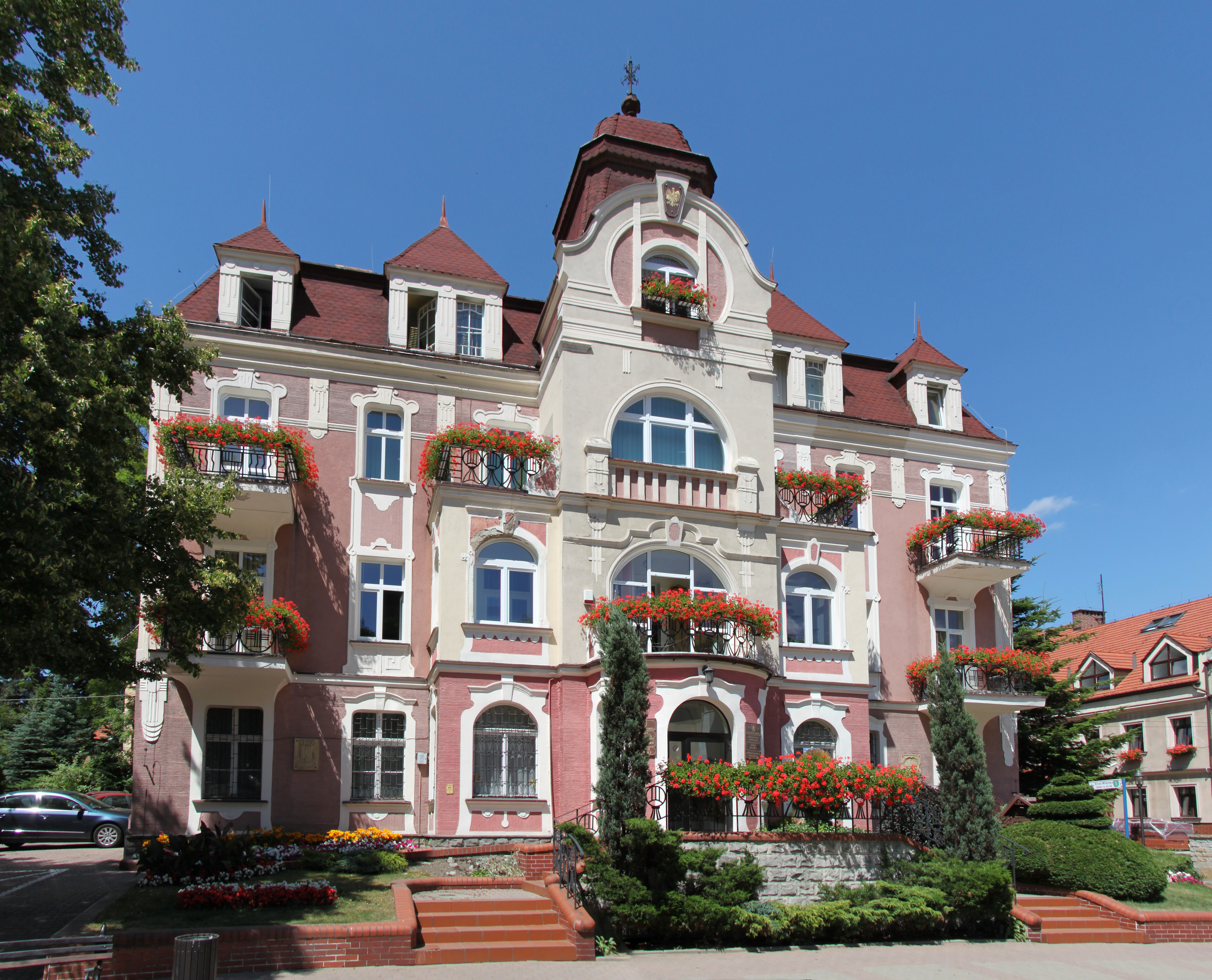
Town Hall

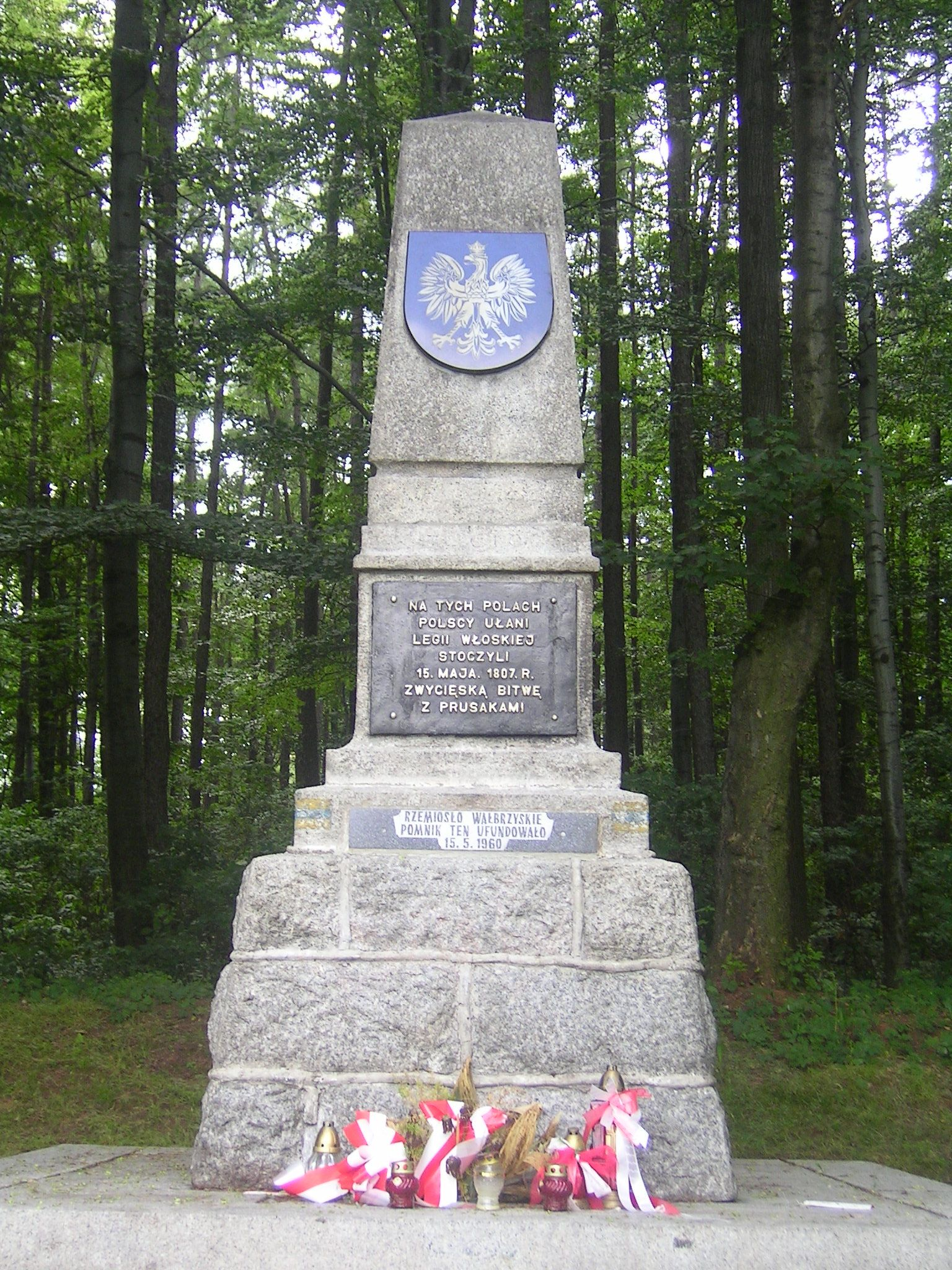
A monument commemorating the Battle of Struga of 1807
