= Wałbrzych County =

Coordinates: 50°47′N 16°17′E

Wałbrzych County Powiat wałbrzyski
- County
- Flag Coat of arms

- Location within the voivodeship
- Country: Poland
- Voivodeship: Lower Silesian
- Seat: Wałbrzych
- Gminas: Total 9 (incl. 4 urban): Boguszów-Gorce; Jedlina-Zdrój; Szczawno-Zdrój; Wałbrzych; Gmina Czarny Bór; Gmina Głuszyca; Gmina Mieroszów; Gmina Stare Bogaczowice; Gmina Walim

Area
  - Total: 514.18 km^{2} (198.53 sq mi)

Population (2019-06-30)
  - Total: 55,820
  - Density: 108.6/km^{2} (281.2/sq mi)
  - Urban: 36,235
  - Rural: 19,585
- Car plates: DBA
- Website: www.powiatwalbrzyski.pl

Wałbrzych County (Polish: powiat wałbrzyski; German: Waldenburg) is a unit of territorial administration and local government (powiat) in Lower Silesian Voivodeship, south-western Poland. It was created on January 1, 1999, as a result of the Polish local government reforms passed in 1998. The county covers an area of 514.2 square kilometres (198.5 sq mi). Its administrative seat is the city of Wałbrzych, which is located outside of the county, and it also contains the towns of Boguszów-Gorce, Głuszyca, Szczawno-Zdrój, Jedlina-Zdrój and Mieroszów.

When the county came into being in 1999, the city of Wałbrzych was not part of its territory, although it served as the county seat. As of 2003 the city county (powiat grodzki) of Wałbrzych was incorporated into Wałbrzych County. Wałbrzych became again a separate city county starting from 1 January 2013 and is no longer part of the Wałbrzych County (powiat wałbrzyski).

As of 2019 the total population of the county is 55,820. The most populated towns are Boguszów-Gorce with 15,368 inhabitants and Głuszyca with 6,361 inhabitants.

== Neighbouring counties ==
Wałbrzych County is bordered by Kamienna Góra County to the west, Jawor County to the north, Świdnica County to the north-east, Dzierżoniów County to the east and Kłodzko County to the south-east. It also borders the Czech Republic to the south.

== Administrative divisions ==
The county is subdivided into eight gminas (three urban, two urban-rural and three rural). These are listed in the following table, in descending order of population.

Gmina	Type	Area (km^{2})	Population (2019)	Seat
Boguszów-Gorce	urban	27.0	15,368	
Gmina Głuszyca	urban-rural	61.9	8,631	Głuszyca
Gmina Mieroszów	urban-rural	76.2	6,808	Mieroszów
Szczawno-Zdrój	urban	14.7	5,608	
Gmina Walim	rural	78.8	5,416	Walim
Gmina Czarny Bór	rural	66.3	4,864	Czarny Bór
Jedlina-Zdrój	urban	17.5	4,828	
Gmina Stare Bogaczowice	rural	86.9	4,297	Stare Bogaczowice
