= Ołpiny =

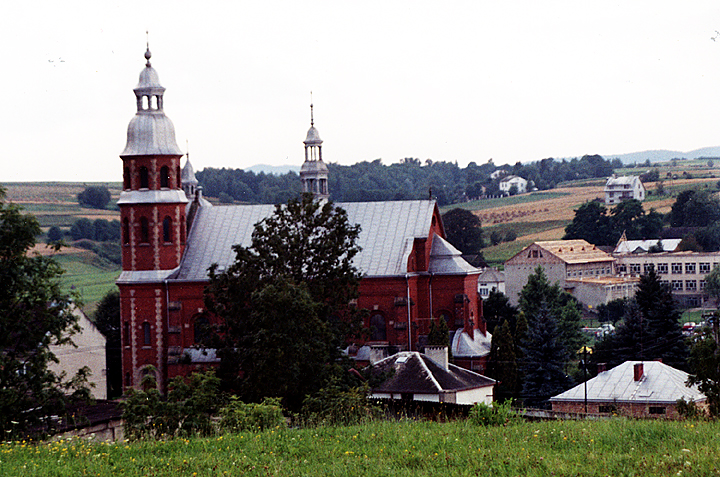
- Church in Ołpiny

- Location within Poland
- Coordinates: 49°49′N 21°12′E
- Country: Poland
- Voivodeship: Lesser Poland
- County: Tarnów
- Gmina: Szerzyny
- Foundation: 1349
- Time zone: UTC+1 (CET)
  - Summer (DST): UTC+2 (CEST)
- Postal code: 32-247
- Area code: +48 14
- Car plates: KTA

Ołpiny ([ɔu̯ˈpinɨ]; Yiddish: אלפין Olpin) is a village in the Lesser Poland Voivodeship (province), district of Tarnów, gmina (commune) of Szerzyny, in southeastern Poland.

The village lies in the sub-Carpathian region known as Pogórze Ciężkowickie where the average elevations reach 350 to 420 meters with the highest Gilowa Góra in the village of Swoszowa, 508 meters, Brzanka in Jodłówka Tuchowska, 538 meters, and Dobrocin in Żurowa.

The valley, part of which Ołpiny occupies, runs northwest to southeast. A small river Olszynka flows at the bottom of the valley separating it into two parts in the course of its 24 kilometers. Olszynka has its source on the slopes of Brzanka which is completely covered with forest. The river empties into the Ropa River in Siepietnica.

== Historical note ==
There is evidence of settlement in the Neolithic (New Stone Age) in stone axes found and displayed at the regional museum in nearby Biecz. These date to 4500-1700 BC. An extensive group of Slavic people who are thought to have migrated from Asia in the 2nd and 3rd millennium BC inhabited an area greater than present Poland. Roman and Byzantine coins found in Biecz indicate an east-west and north-south trade route. In the 880s AD the Kingdom of Moravia extended its influence over this area though much is uncertain except that the people converted to Christianity during this period. The historical period begins in 12th or 13th century.

The Benedictine abbey at Tyniec held claims over the geographical area that included Ołpiny from the mid-12th century for more than a hundred years. The degree of influence of the abbey is disputed but there is evidence that a tithe was collected by the monastery.

Ołpiny was officially founded on August 7, 1349. On this date a royal decree in the name of King Kazimierz Wielki (Casimir the Great) was issued at the Biecz castle and granted Ołpiny the right to establish a village. This declaration in the form of a royal privilege that granted the right to settle the land, clear the primeval forest, also released the first inhabitants from any obligations to the crown for twenty years.

The village was tied to the Biecz castle and was royal property until King Jagiełło gave Ołpiny away in 1386 to one Spytek of Melsztyn, and to his survivors for services rendered. For 500 years various owners held the village inhabitants under an ever tightening feudal yoke, a state not far removed from slavery.

Few historically significant events happened in the village beyond various taxes, and military obligations, which at times nearly brought it to ruin. The Tatar invasion was unusual. The Mongol horde stormed through in 1241. The mostly peaceful peasant uprising of 1748 and a bloody Austrian-instigated one of 1846 were also extraordinary events. In the early-mid 1900s there was more violence from various armies mostly passing through during the two World Wars. There were plenty of massive population decimations by cholera, typhus and other diseases especially in the 17th century. In the 1860s immigration became a steady part of life here and it continues till today.
