= Stanisław Zając =

Polish lawyer and politician

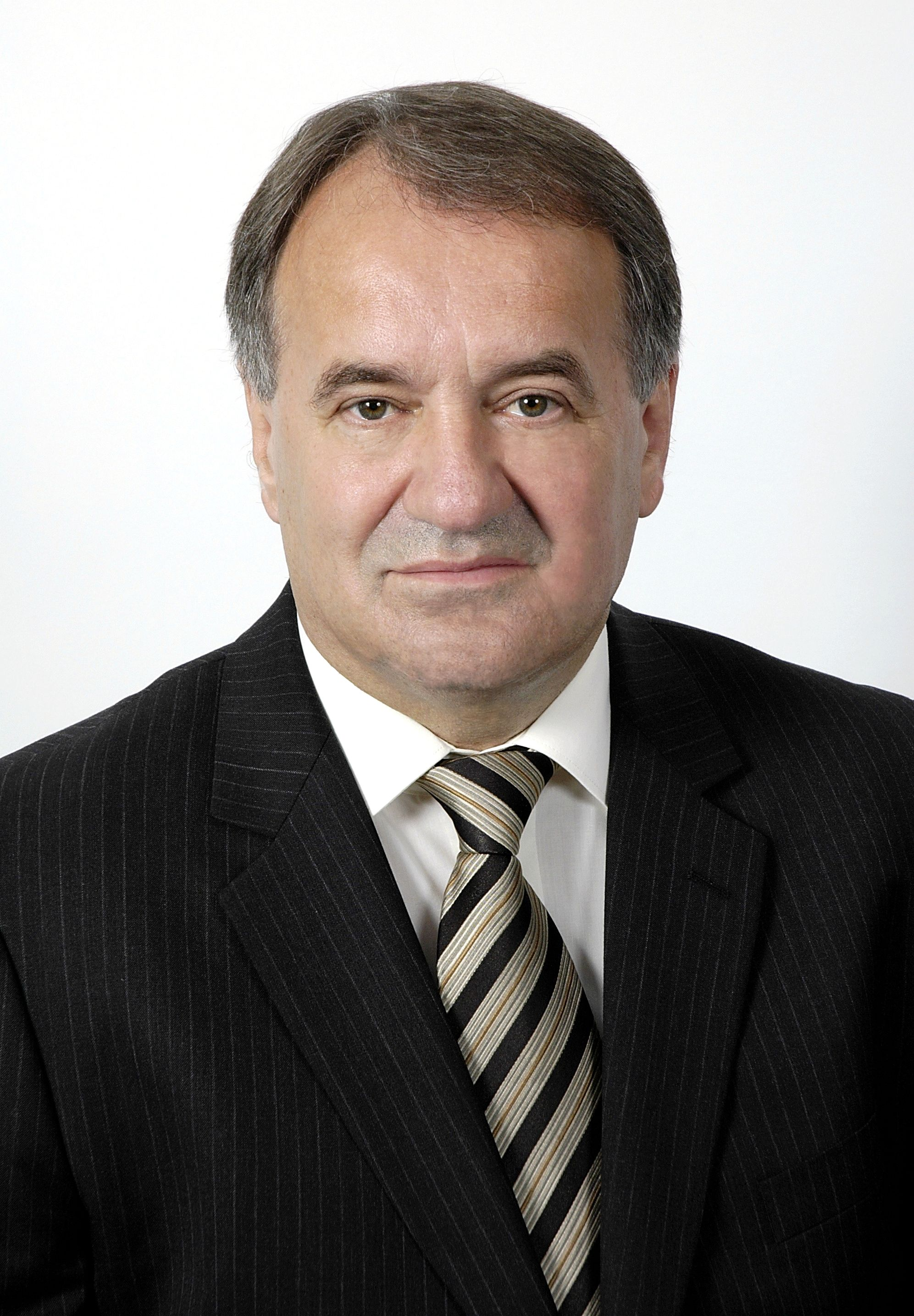

member of Sejm 2005–2007
- In office 25 September 2005 – April 2010

Personal details
- Born: 1 May 1949 Święcany, Poland
- Died: 10 April 2010 (aged 60) Smolensk, Russia
- Party: Law and Justice

Stanisław Zając (Polish pronunciation: [staˈɲiswav ˈzajɔnts], 1 May 1949 – 10 April 2010) was a Polish lawyer and politician. He was a member of Sejm 1991–1993 and Sejm 1997–2001. On 25 September 2005 he was elected a member of the Sejm again, getting 25,225 votes in the 22 Krosno district as a candidate from the Law and Justice list.

Zając was born in Święcany.

On 1 May 2008, he won the by-election for the Polish Senate, held in Krosno-constituency following the death of Senator Andrzej Mazurkiewicz.

He was listed on the flight manifest of the Tupolev Tu-154 of the 36th Special Aviation Regiment carrying the President of Poland Lech Kaczyński which crashed near Smolensk-North airport near Pechersk near Smolensk, Russia, on 10 April 2010, killing all aboard.

Zając was posthumously awarded the Commander's Cross with Star of the Order of the Polonia Restituta (2010). He had been awarded the gold and silver medals for his contribution to national defence (2010 and 2009, respectively) and he was made a Freeman of the Municipality of Dydnia Jasło in 2010.

== See also ==
- List of Sejm members (2005–2007)
