= Burzyn =

Burzyn may refer to the following places in Poland:

- Burzyn, Lesser Poland Voivodeship, in southern Poland
- Burzyn, Podlaskie Voivodeship, in north-eastern Poland
