= Harklowa, Podkarpackie Voivodeship =

Harklowa
- Village
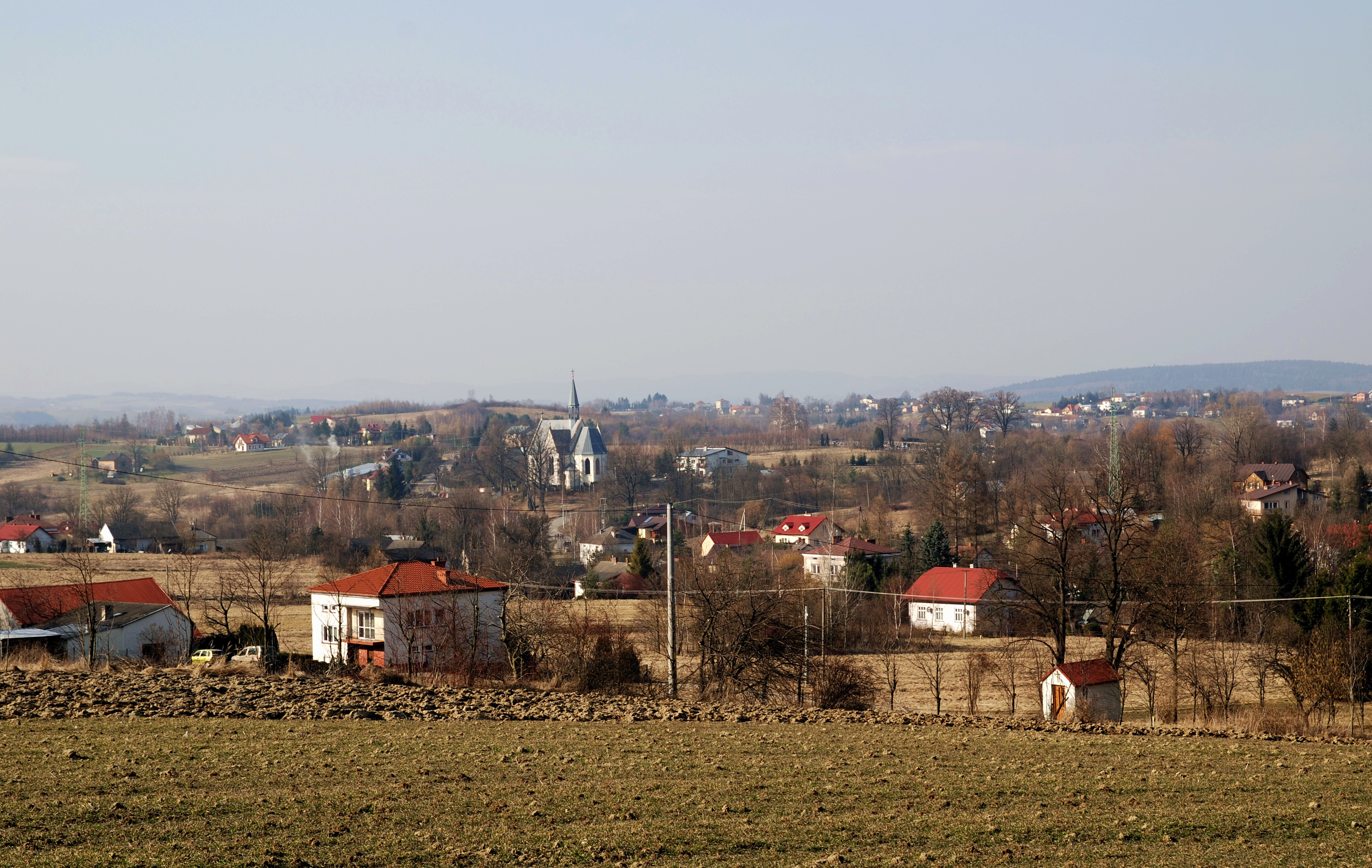
- Harklowa

- Location within Poland
- Coordinates: 49°43′N 21°21′E
- Country: Poland
- Voivodeship: Subcarpathian
- County: Jasło
- Gmina: Skołyszyn
- Population: 2,000

Harklowa [xarˈklɔva] is a village in the administrative district of Gmina Skołyszyn, within Jasło County, Subcarpathian Voivodeship, in south-eastern Poland.

Polish supercentenarian Aleksandra Dranka (1903-2014) was born in and lived in the village.
