= Gmina Skołyszyn =

Gmina Skołyszyn Skołyszyn Commune
- Gmina
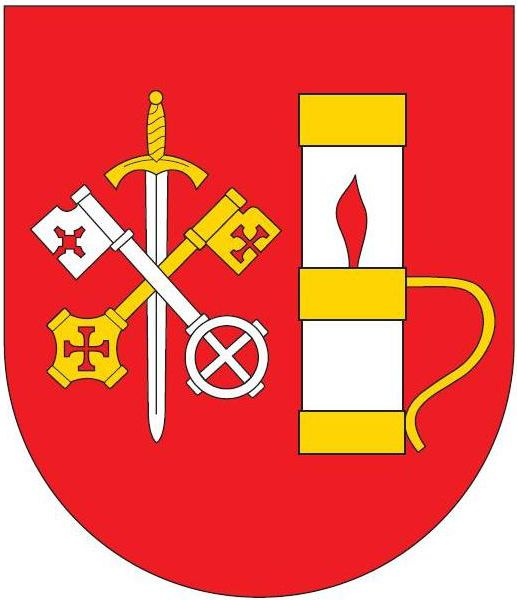
- Coat of arms
- Interactive map of Gmina Skołyszyn
- Coordinates (Skołyszyn): 49°44′53″N 21°20′20″E
- Country: Poland
- Voivodeship: Subcarpathian
- County: Jasło
- Seat: Skołyszyn

Area
  - Total: 77.92 km^{2} (30.09 sq mi)

Population (2006)
  - Total: 12,422
  - Density: 159.4/km^{2} (412.9/sq mi)

Gmina Skołyszyn is a rural gmina (administrative district) in Jasło County, Subcarpathian Voivodeship, in south-eastern Poland. Its seat is the village of Skołyszyn, which lies approximately 10 kilometres (6 mi) west of Jasło and 58 km (36 mi) south-west of the regional capital Rzeszów.

The gmina covers an area of 77.92 square kilometres (30.1 sq mi), and as of 2006 its total population is 12,422.

The gmina contains part of the protected area called Pasmo Brzanki Landscape Park.

== Villages ==
Gmina Skołyszyn contains the villages and settlements of Bączal Dolny, Bączal Górny, Harklowa, Jabłonica, Kunowa, Lipnica Górna, Lisów, Przysieki, Pusta Wola, Siedliska Sławęcińskie, Siepietnica, Skołyszyn, Sławęcin and Święcany.

== Neighbouring gminas ==
Gmina Skołyszyn is bordered by the gminas of Biecz, Brzyska, Jasło, Lipinki and Szerzyny.
