= Siedliska Sławęcińskie =

- Village
- Location within Poland
- Coordinates: 49°44′20″N 21°22′46″E
- Country: Poland
- Voivodeship: Podkarpackie
- County: Jasło
- Gmina: Skołyszyn

Siedliska Sławęcińskie [ɕɛdˈlʲiska swavɛnˈt͡ɕiɲskʲɛ] is a village in the administrative district of Gmina Skołyszyn, within Jasło County, Podkarpackie Voivodeship, in southeastern Poland.
