= Zabłędza =

- Village
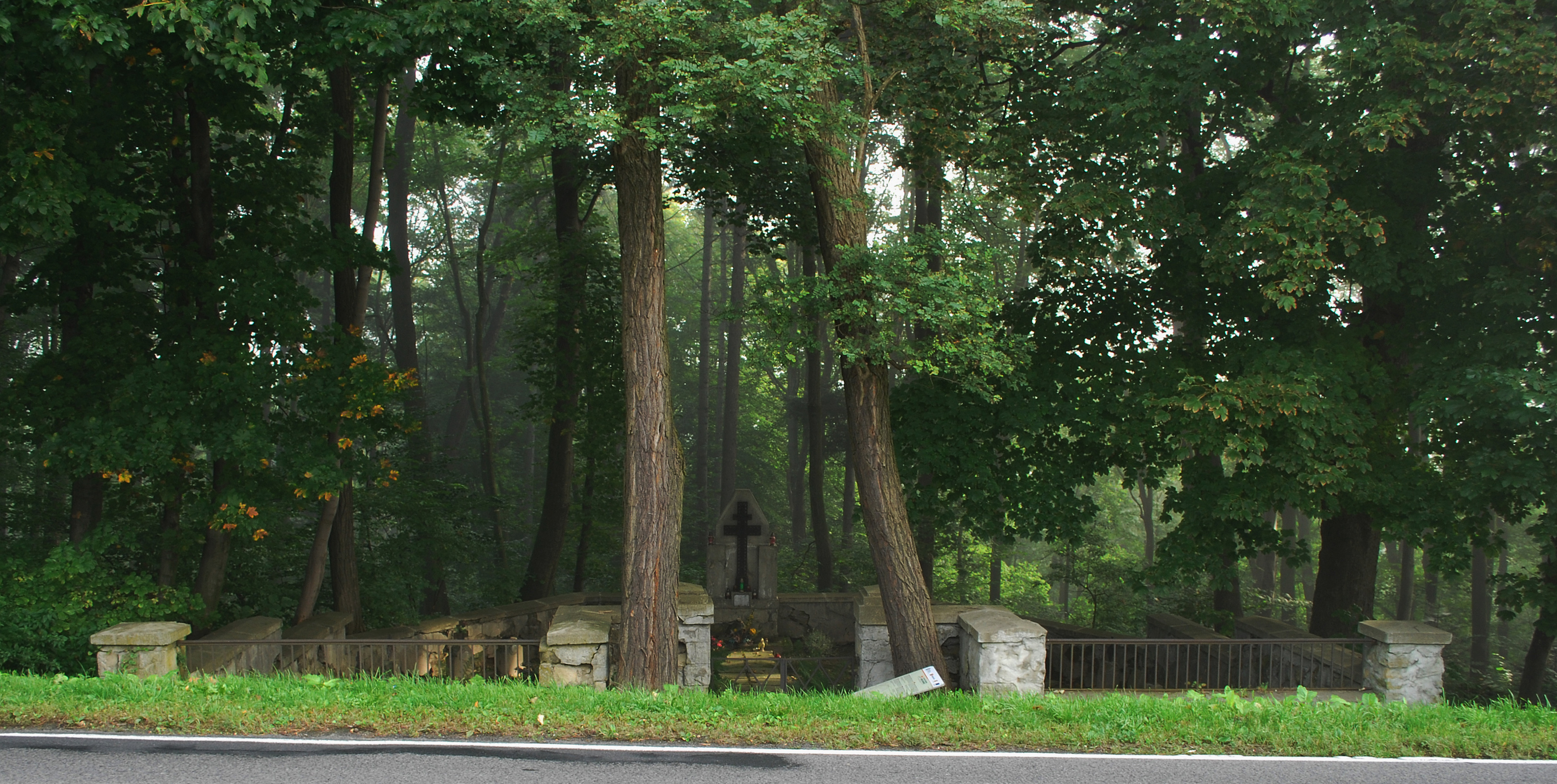
- War cemetery

- Location within Poland
- Coordinates: 49°56′N 21°4′E
- Country: Poland
- Voivodeship: Lesser Poland
- County: Tarnów
- Gmina: Tuchów
- Elevation: 275 m (902 ft)
- Population (approx.): 834
- Website: http://www.zabledza.pl

Zabłędza [zaˈbwɛnd͡za] is a village in the administrative district of Gmina Tuchów, within Tarnów County, Lesser Poland Voivodeship, in southern Poland.

The village has an approximate population of 834.
