= Kunowa =

- Village
- Location within Poland
- Coordinates: 49°44′8″N 21°20′19″E
- Country: Poland
- Voivodeship: Subcarpathian
- County: Jasło
- Gmina: Skołyszyn
- Population: 489

Kunowa [kuˈnɔva] is a village in the administrative district of Gmina Skołyszyn, within Jasło County, Subcarpathian Voivodeship, in south-eastern Poland.
