= Lisów, Podkarpackie Voivodeship =

Lisów
- Village
- Location within Poland
- Coordinates: 49°46′2″N 21°19′48″E
- Country: Poland
- Voivodeship: Subcarpathian
- County: Jasło
- Gmina: Skołyszyn

Lisów [ˈlisuf] is a village in the administrative district of Gmina Skołyszyn, within Jasło County, Subcarpathian Voivodeship, in south-eastern Poland.

In the western part of the village there is a stronghold dated on 10th - 13th century that was a part of the Lesser Poland defence line in Carpathian Mountain belonging to Biecz castellany.

During the Second World War Lisów was a part of Polish Home Army operational area.

The village has population of approximately 900.
