= Szerzyny =

- Village
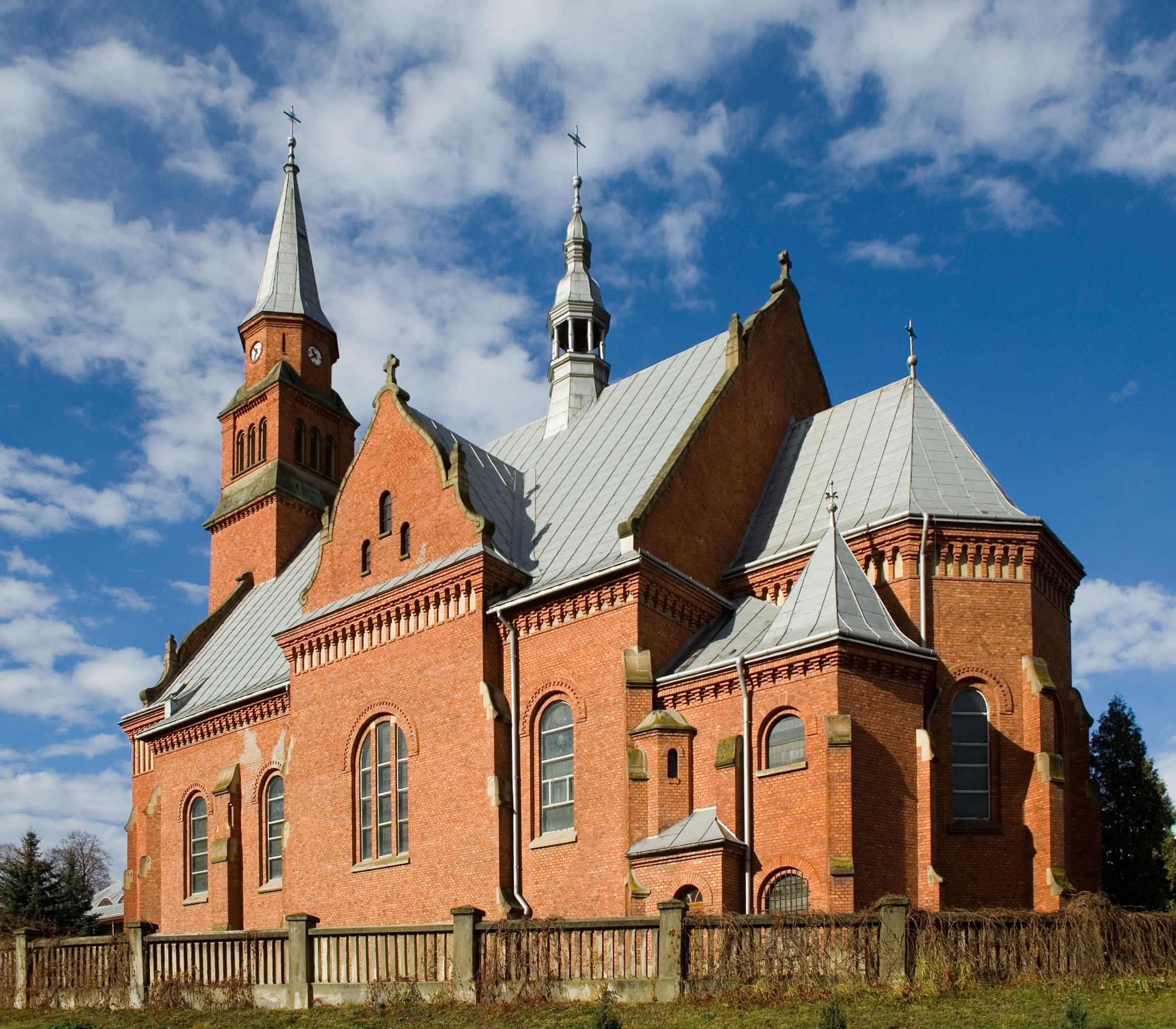
- Church of Our Lady of the Rosary

- Location within Poland
- Coordinates: 49°49′N 21°16′E
- Country: Poland
- Voivodeship: Lesser Poland
- County: Tarnów
- Gmina: Szerzyny

Szerzyny [ʂɛˈʐɨnɨ] is a village in Tarnów County, Lesser Poland Voivodeship, in southern Poland. It is the seat of the gmina (administrative district) called Gmina Szerzyny.
