= Jabłonica, Podkarpackie Voivodeship =

Jabłonica
- Village
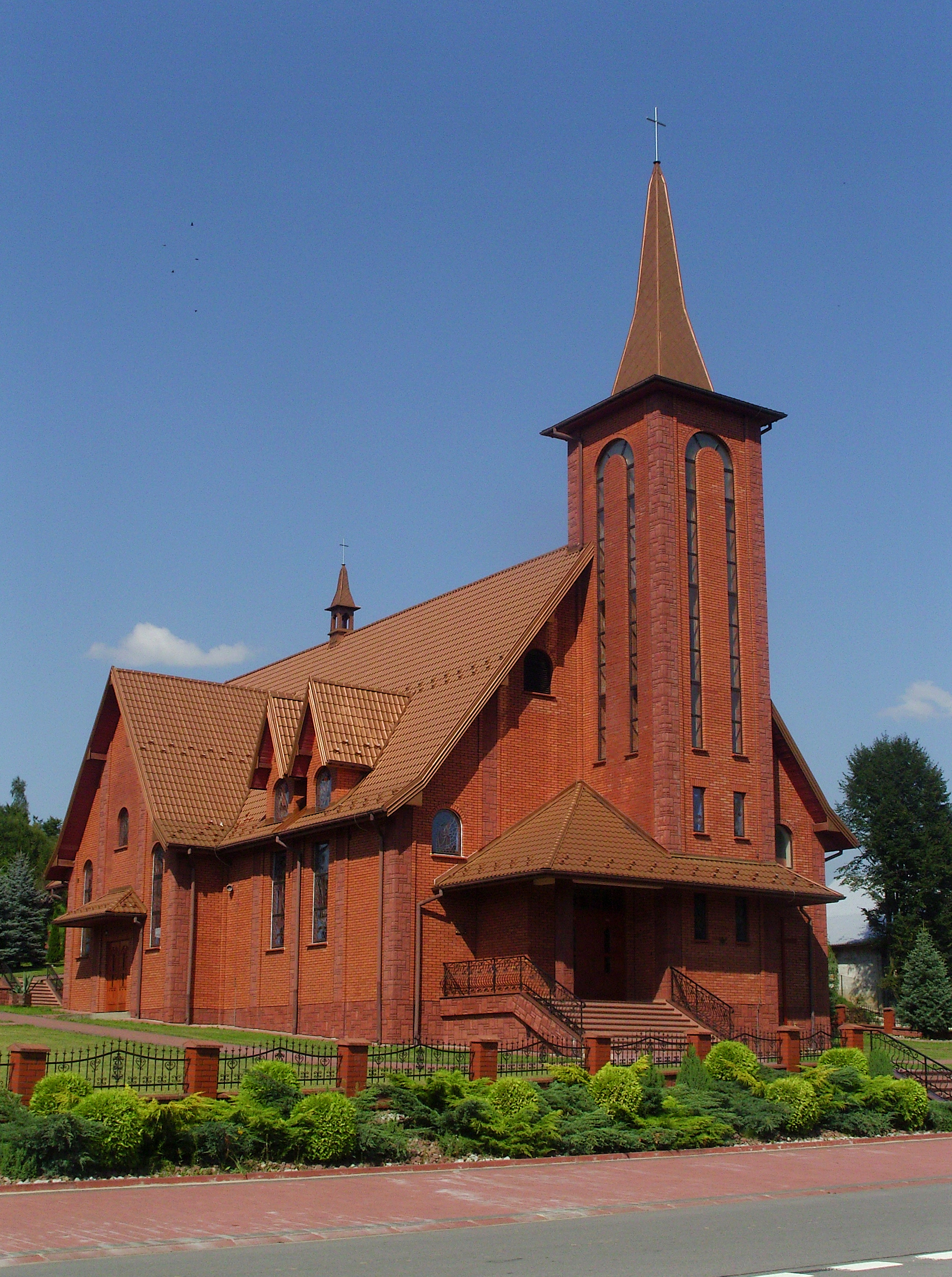
- Church of the Queen Virgin Mary

- Location within Poland
- Coordinates: 49°47′29″N 21°19′49″E
- Country: Poland
- Voivodeship: Subcarpathian
- County: Jasło
- Gmina: Skołyszyn
- Population: 680

Jabłonica [jabwɔˈnit͡sa] is a village in the administrative district of Gmina Skołyszyn, within Jasło County, Subcarpathian Voivodeship, in south-eastern Poland.
