= Lubaszowa =

- Village
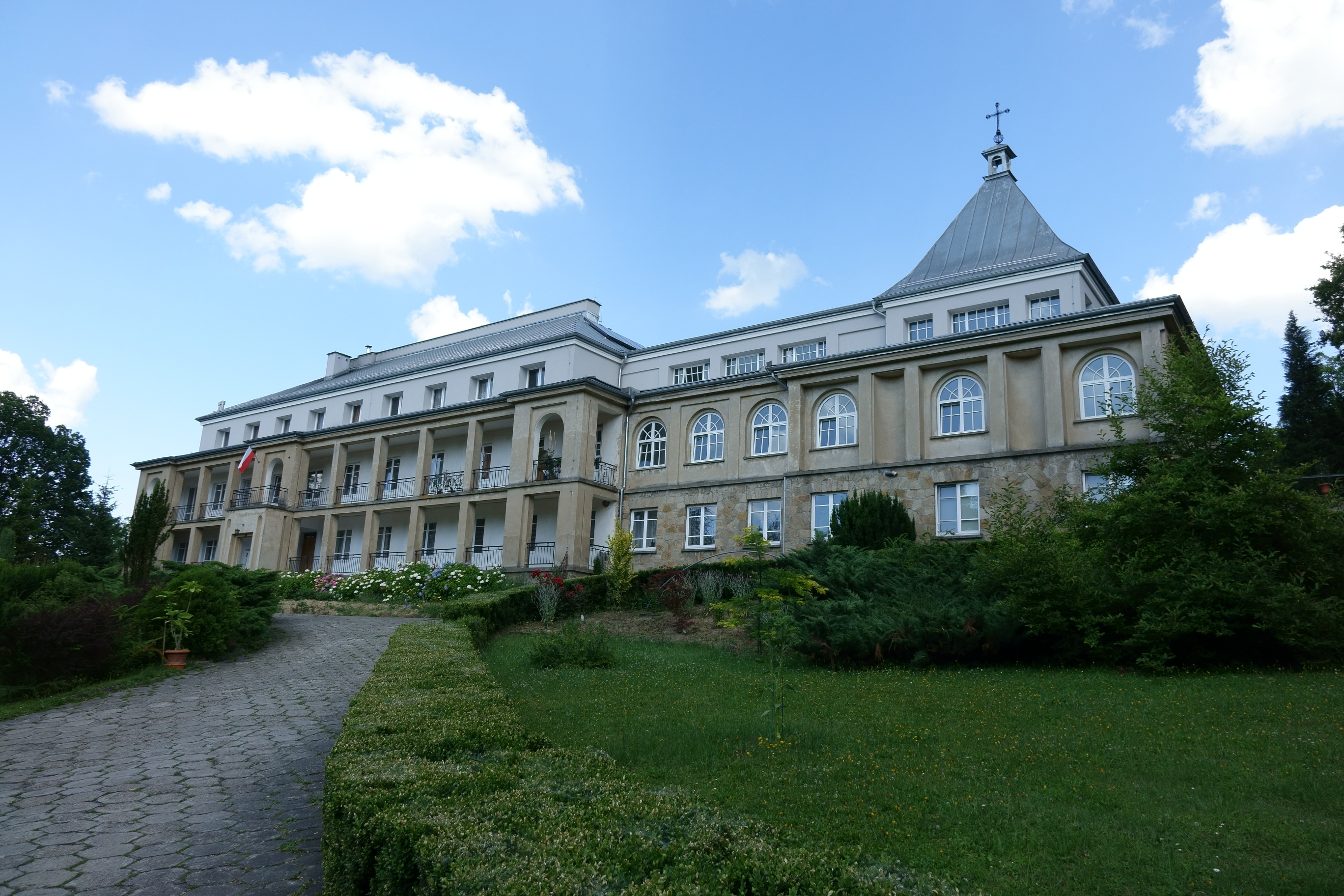
- Redemptorist monastery in Lubaszowa

- Location within Poland
- Coordinates: 49°52′N 21°2′E
- Country: Poland
- Voivodeship: Lesser Poland
- County: Tarnów
- Gmina: Tuchów
- Population: 783

Lubaszowa [lubaˈʂɔva] is a village in the administrative district of Gmina Tuchów, within Tarnów County, Lesser Poland Voivodeship, in southern Poland.
