= Łowczów =

- Village
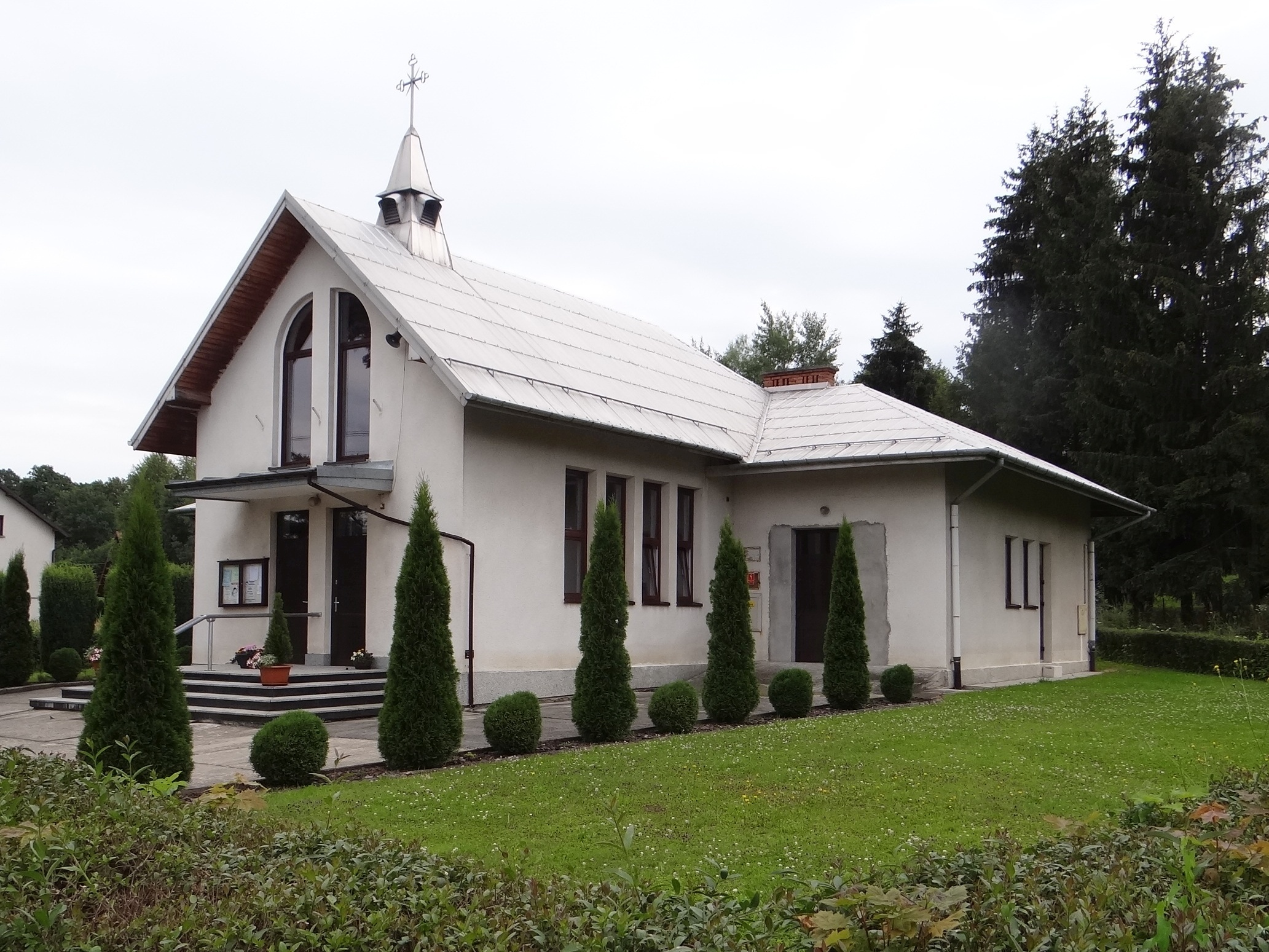
- Chapel

- Location within Poland
- Coordinates: 49°55′N 21°0′E
- Country: Poland
- Voivodeship: Lesser Poland
- County: Tarnów
- Gmina: Tuchów

Łowczów [ˈwɔft͡ʂuf] is a village in the administrative district of Gmina Tuchów, within Tarnów County, Lesser Poland Voivodeship, in southern Poland.
