= Gmina Szerzyny =

Gmina Szerzyny Szerzyny Commune
- Gmina
- Coat of arms
- Interactive map of Gmina Szerzyny
- Coordinates (Szerzyny): 49°49′N 21°16′E
- Country: Poland
- Voivodeship: Lesser Poland
- County: Tarnów County
- Seat: Szerzyny

Area
  - Total: 82.24 km^{2} (31.75 sq mi)

Population (2006)
  - Total: 8,211
  - Density: 99.84/km^{2} (258.6/sq mi)
- Website: http://www.gmszerzyny.republika.pl

Gmina Szerzyny is a rural gmina (administrative district) in Tarnów County, Lesser Poland Voivodeship, in southern Poland. Its seat is the village of Szerzyny, which lies approximately 31 kilometres (19 mi) south-east of Tarnów and 99 km (62 mi) east of the regional capital Kraków.

The gmina covers an area of 82.24 square kilometres (31.8 sq mi), and as of 2006 its total population is 8,211.

The gmina contains part of the protected area called Pasmo Brzanki Landscape Park.

== Villages ==
Gmina Szerzyny contains the villages and settlements of Czermna, Ołpiny, Swoszowa, Szerzyny and Żurowa.

== Neighbouring gminas ==
Gmina Szerzyny is bordered by the gminas of Biecz, Brzyska, Jodłowa, Ryglice, Rzepiennik Strzyżewski, Skołyszyn and Tuchów.
