= Buchcice =

- Village
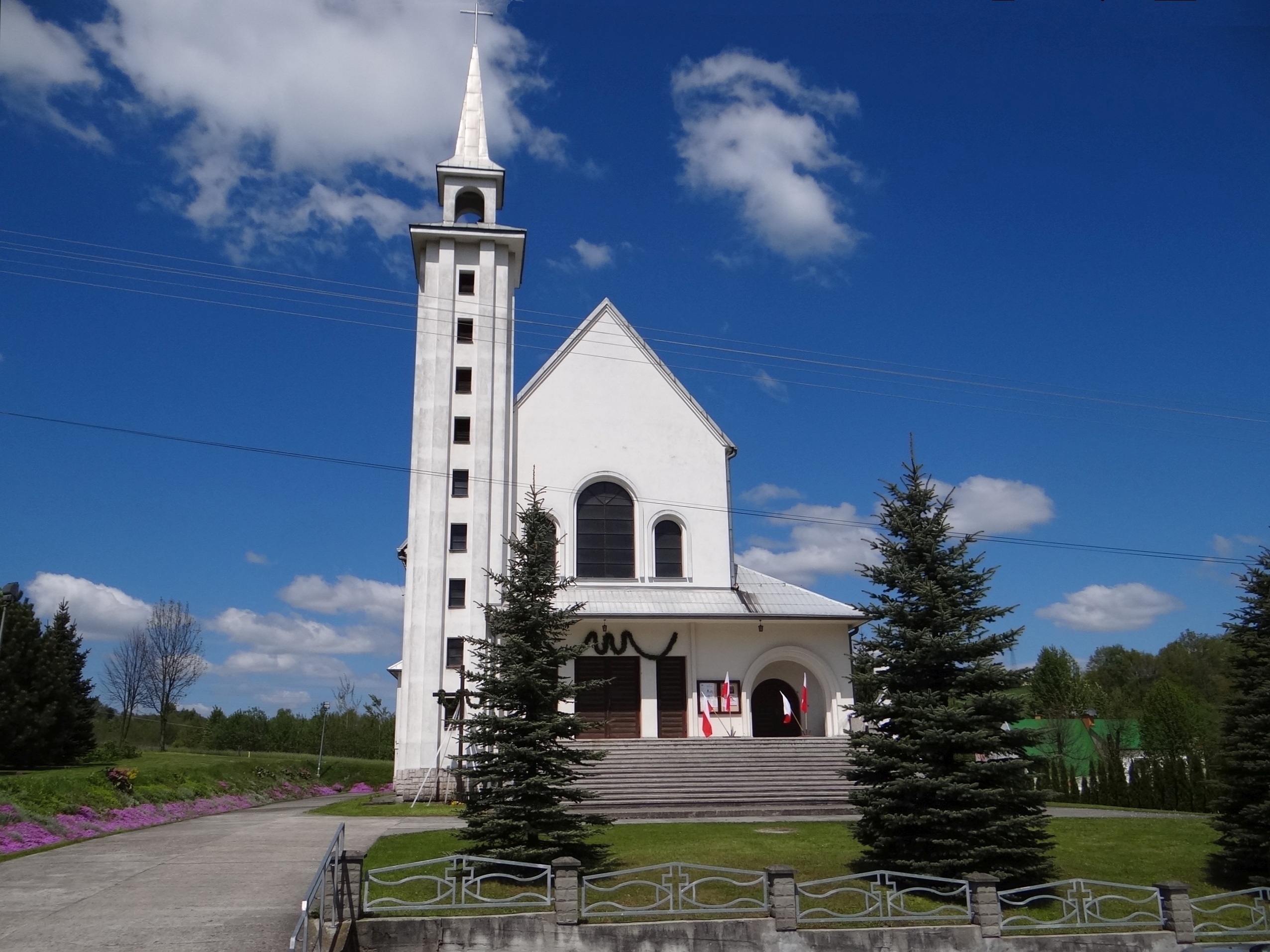
- Church in Buchcice

- Location within Poland
- Coordinates: 49°54′15″N 21°1′3″E
- Country: Poland
- Voivodeship: Lesser Poland
- County: Tarnów
- Gmina: Tuchów

Population
  - Total: 660

Buchcice [buxˈt͡ɕit͡sɛ] (formerly Meszna Szlachecka) is a village in the administrative district of Gmina Tuchów, within Tarnów County, Lesser Poland Voivodeship, in southern Poland.
