= Lipnica Górna, Podkarpackie Voivodeship =

Lipnica Górna
- Village
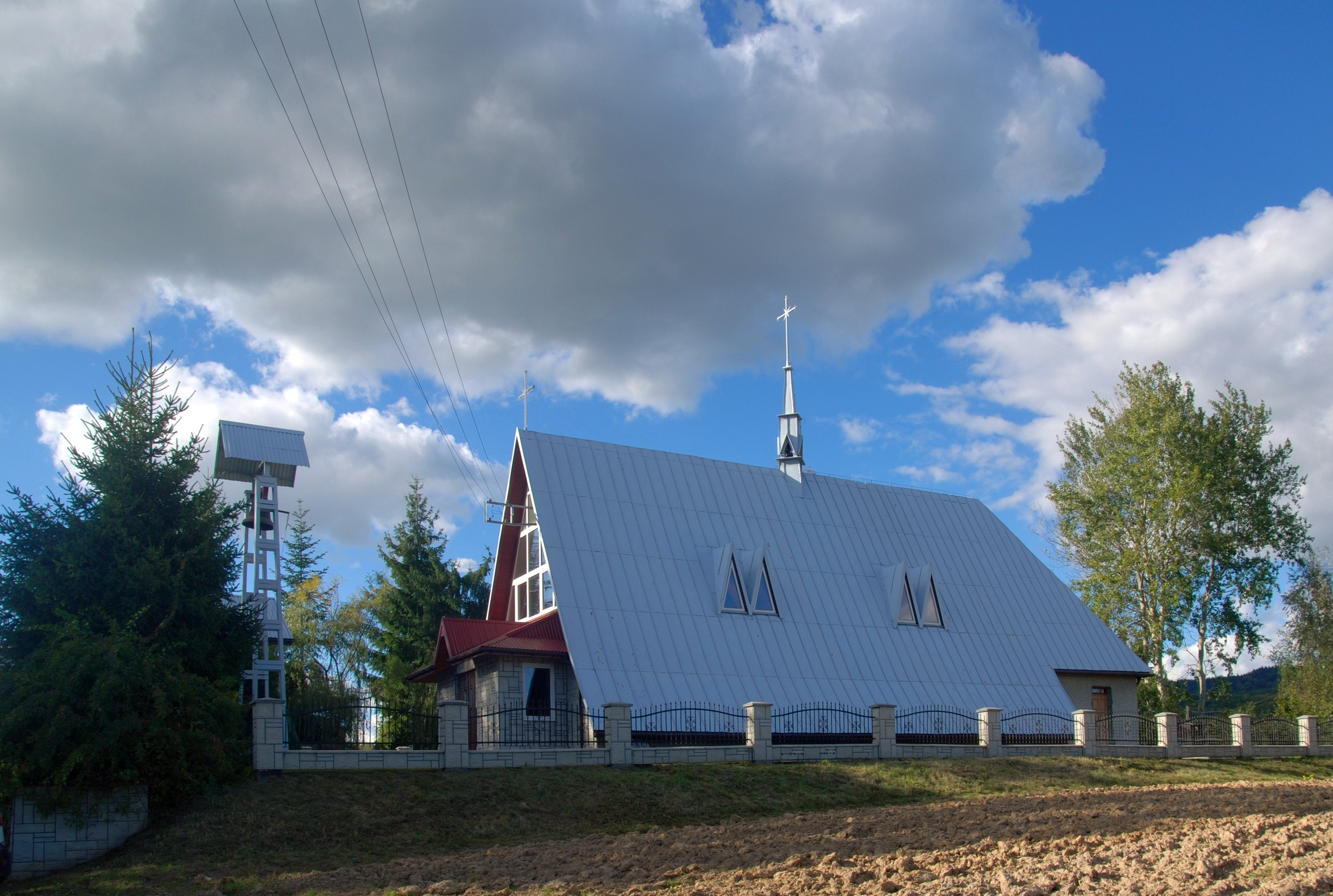
- Church of Saint Michael

- Location within Poland
- Coordinates: 49°48′N 21°22′E
- Country: Poland
- Voivodeship: Subcarpathian
- County: Jasło
- Gmina: Skołyszyn

Lipnica Górna (Polish pronunciation: [lipˈɲit͡sa ˈɡurna]) is a village in the administrative district of Gmina Skołyszyn, within Jasło County, Subcarpathian Voivodeship, in south-eastern Poland.
