= Pusta Wola =

- Village
- Location within Poland
- Coordinates: 49°44′N 21°18′E
- Country: Poland
- Voivodeship: Subcarpathian
- County: Jasło
- Gmina: Skołyszyn

Pusta Wola [ˈpusta ˈvɔla] is a village in the administrative district of Gmina Skołyszyn, within Jasło County, Subcarpathian Voivodeship, in south-eastern Poland.
