= Czermna, Lesser Poland Voivodeship =

Czermna
- Village
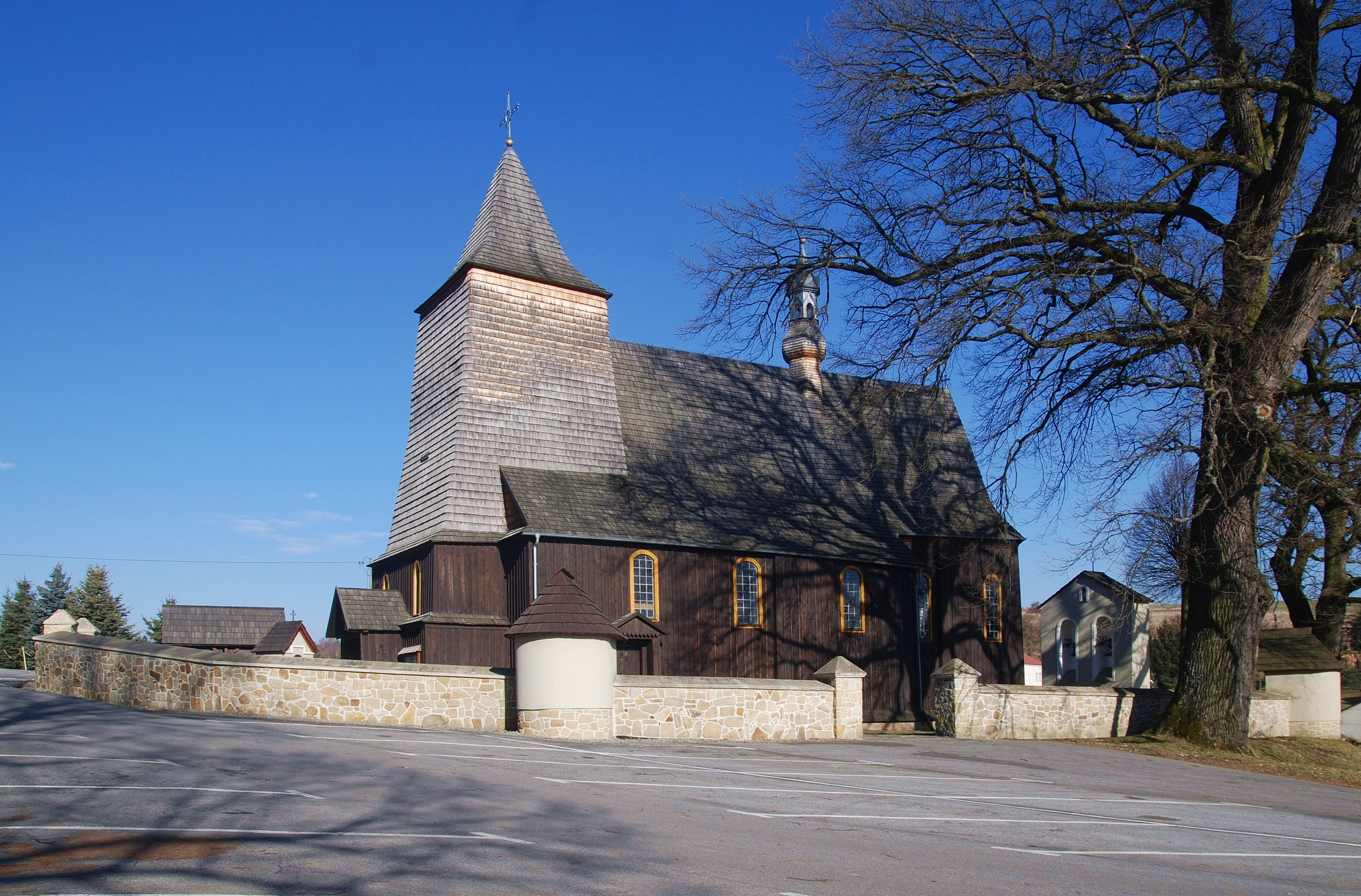
- Church of Saint Martin

- Location within Poland
- Coordinates: 49°48′35″N 21°17′23″E
- Country: Poland
- Voivodeship: Lesser Poland
- County: Tarnów
- Gmina: Szerzyny

Czermna [ˈt͡ʂɛrmna] is a village in the administrative district of Gmina Szerzyny, within Tarnów County, Lesser Poland Voivodeship, in southern Poland.
