= Trzemeszna =

- Village
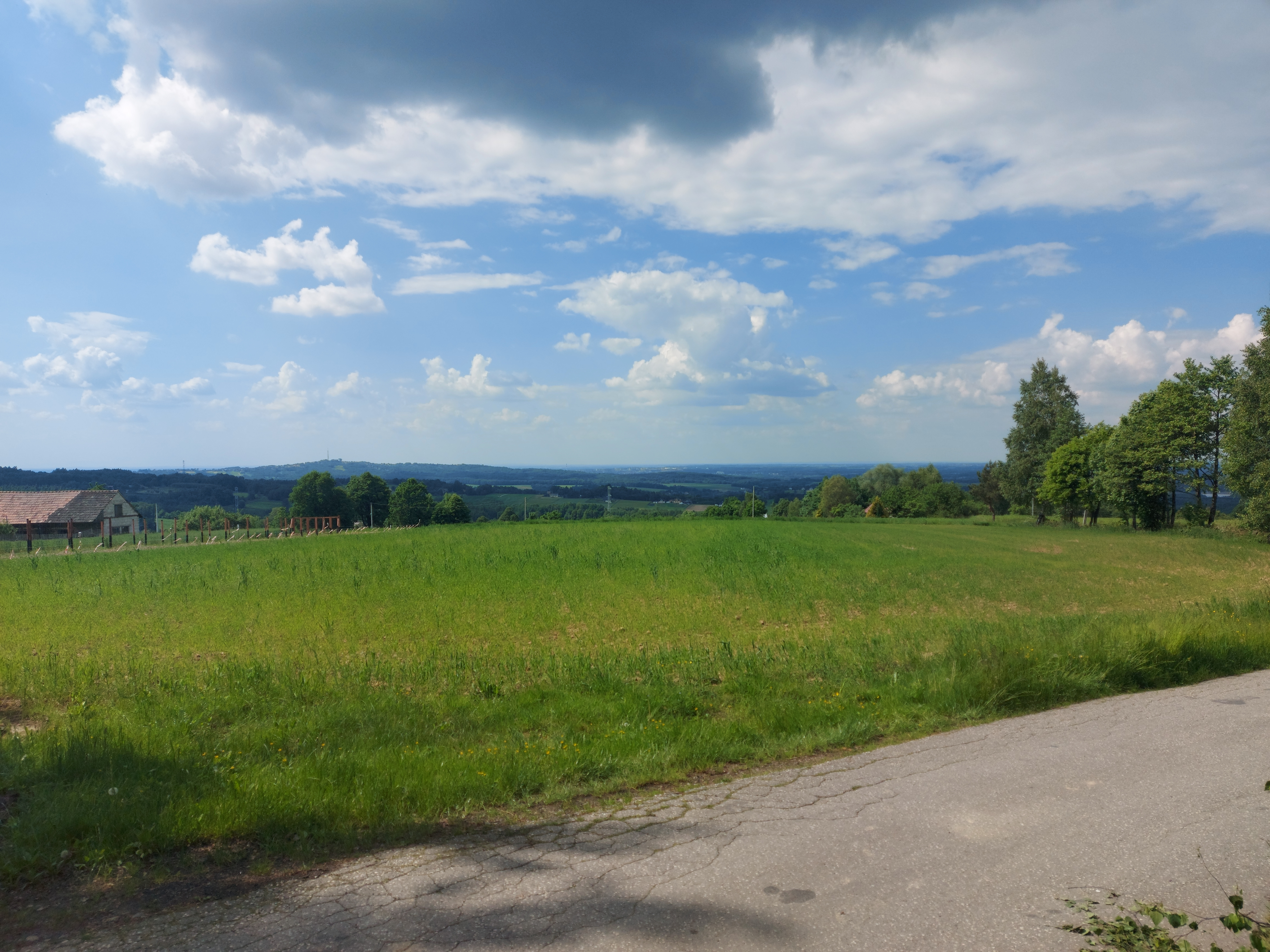

- Location within Poland
- Coordinates: 49°57′N 21°4′E
- Country: Poland
- Voivodeship: Lesser Poland
- County: Tarnów
- Gmina: Tuchów

Trzemeszna [tʂɛˈmɛʂna] is a village in the administrative district of Gmina Tuchów, within Tarnów County, Lesser Poland Voivodeship, in southern Poland.
