= Karwodrza =

- Village
- Location within Poland
- Coordinates: 49°55′17″N 21°4′4″E
- Country: Poland
- Voivodeship: Lesser Poland
- County: Tarnów
- Gmina: Tuchów

Karwodrza [karˈvɔdʐa] is a village in the administrative district of Gmina Tuchów, within Tarnów County, Lesser Poland Voivodeship, in southern Poland.
