= Gmina Tuchów =

Gmina Tuchów Tuchów Commune
- Gmina
- Flag Coat of arms
- Interactive map of Gmina Tuchów
- Coordinates (Tuchów): 49°54′N 21°3′E
- Country: Poland
- Voivodeship: Lesser Poland
- County: Tarnów County
- Seat: Tuchów

Area
  - Total: 100.14 km^{2} (38.66 sq mi)

Population (2006)
  - Total: 17,654
  - Density: 176.29/km^{2} (456.60/sq mi)
  - Urban: 6,501
  - Rural: 11,153
- Website: http://www.tuchow.pl

Gmina Tuchów is an urban-rural gmina (administrative district) in Tarnów County, Lesser Poland Voivodeship, in southern Poland. Its seat is the town of Tuchów, which lies approximately 16 kilometres (10 mi) south of Tarnów and 82 km (51 mi) east of the regional capital Kraków.

The gmina covers an area of 100.14 square kilometres (38.7 sq mi), and as of 2006 its total population is 17,654 (out of which the population of Tuchów amounts to 6,501, and the population of the rural part of the gmina is 11,153).

The gmina contains part of the protected area called Pasmo Brzanki Landscape Park.

== Villages ==
Apart from the town of Tuchów, Gmina Tuchów contains the villages and settlements of Buchcice, Burzyn, Dąbrówka Tuchowska, Jodłówka Tuchowska, Karwodrza, Łowczów, Lubaszowa, Meszna Opacka, Piotrkowice, Siedliska, Trzemeszna and Zabłędza.

== Neighbouring gminas ==
Gmina Tuchów is bordered by the gminas of Gromnik, Pleśna, Ryglice, Rzepiennik Strzyżewski, Skrzyszów, Szerzyny and Tarnów.
