= Sławęcin, Podkarpackie Voivodeship =

Sławęcin
- Village
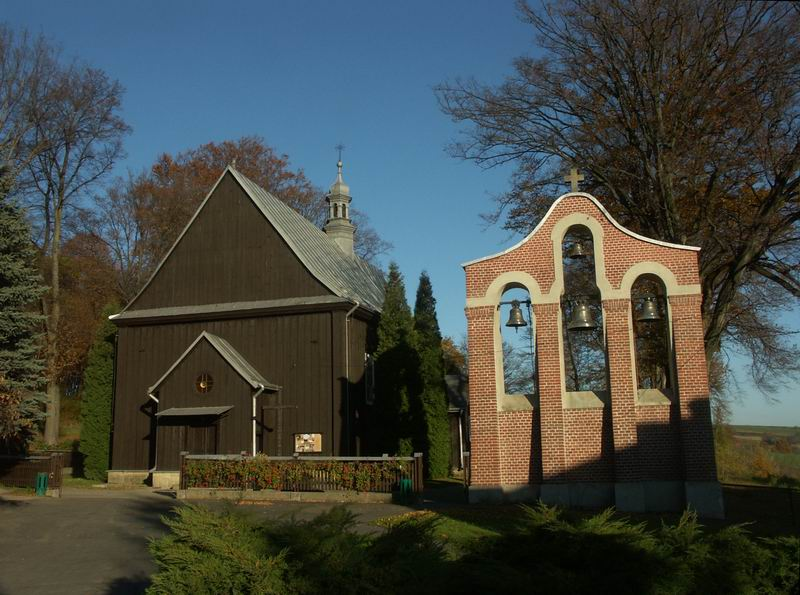
- St. Catherine church from 1779

- Location within Poland
- Coordinates: 49°44′35″N 21°22′0″E
- Country: Poland
- Voivodeship: Subcarpathian
- County: Jasło
- Gmina: Skołyszyn

Sławęcin [swaˈvɛnt͡ɕin] is a village in the administrative district of Gmina Skołyszyn, within Jasło County, Subcarpathian Voivodeship, in south-eastern Poland.
