= Skołyszyn =

- Village
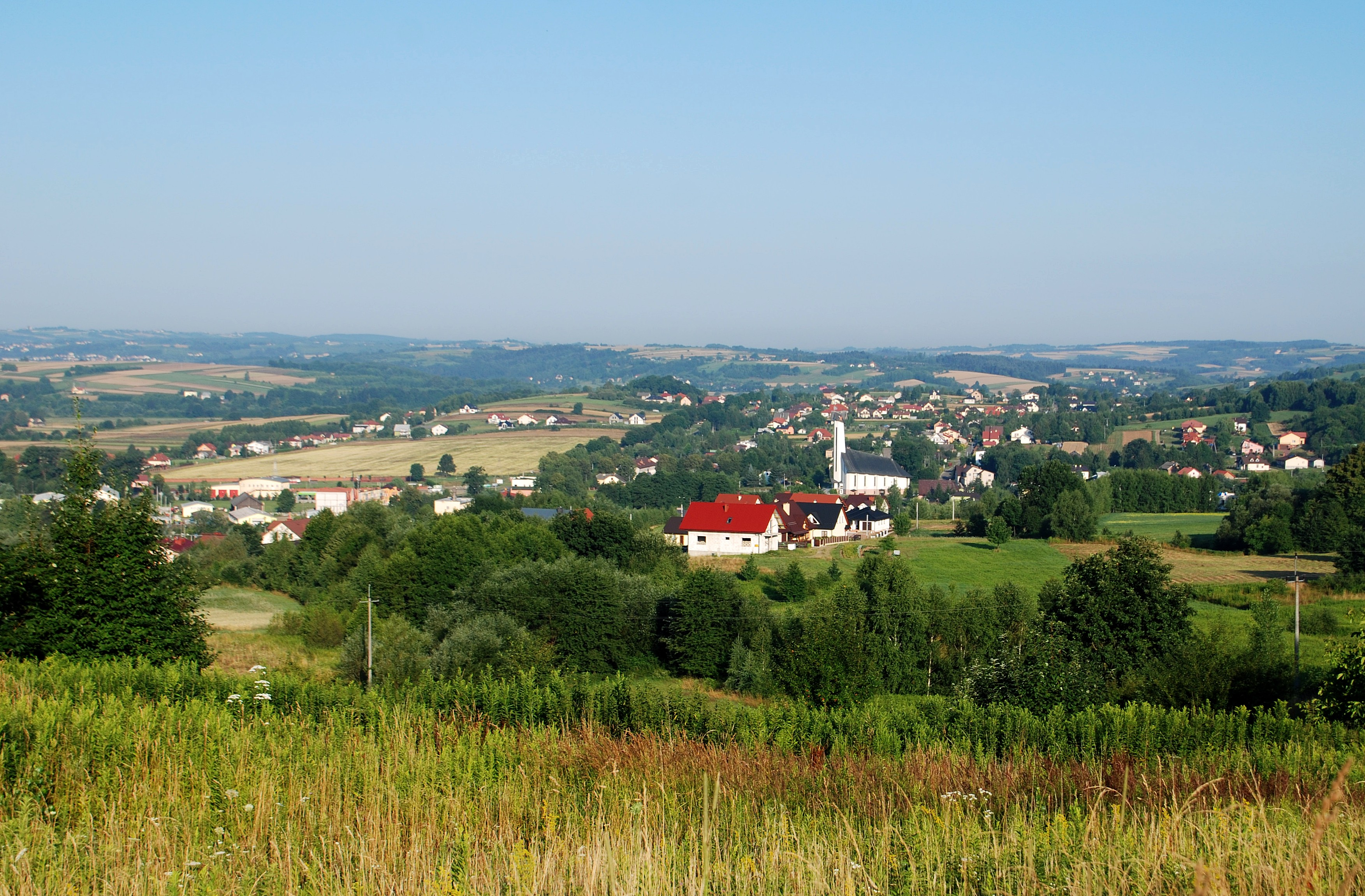
- Skołyszyn

- Location within Poland
- Coordinates: 49°44′53″N 21°20′20″E
- Country: Poland
- Voivodeship: Subcarpathian
- County: Jasło
- Gmina: Skołyszyn

Skołyszyn [skɔˈwɨʂɨn] is a village in Jasło County, Subcarpathian Voivodeship, in south-eastern Poland. It is the seat of the Gmina Skołyszyn.
