= Meszna Opacka =

- Village
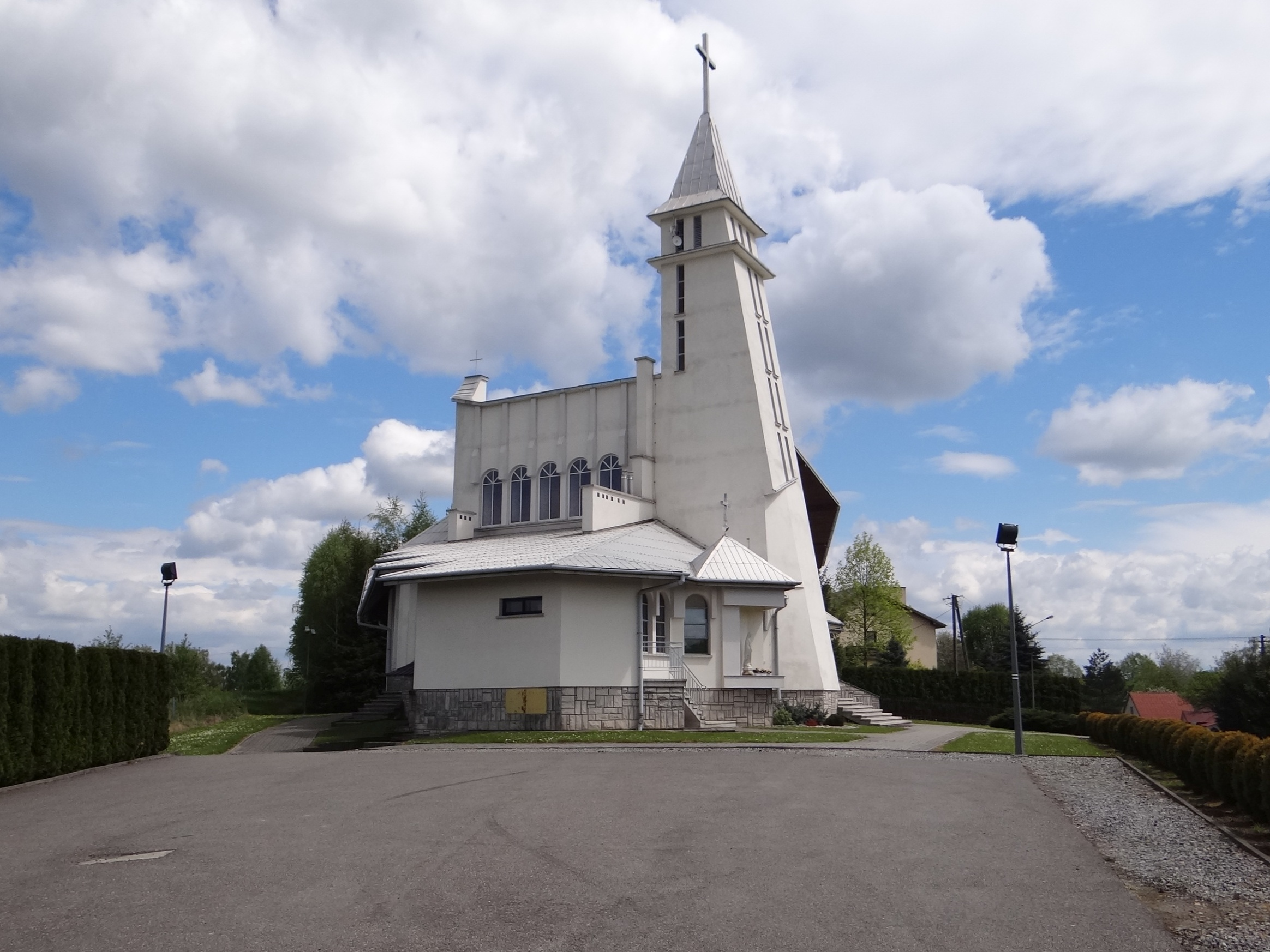
- Church in Meszna Opacka

- Location within Poland
- Coordinates: 49°53′24″N 20°59′22″E
- Country: Poland
- Voivodeship: Lesser Poland
- County: Tarnów
- Gmina: Tuchów

Meszna Opacka [ˈmɛʂna ɔˈpat͡ska] is a village in the administrative district of Gmina Tuchów, within Tarnów County, Lesser Poland Voivodeship, in southern Poland.
