= Przysieki =

- Village
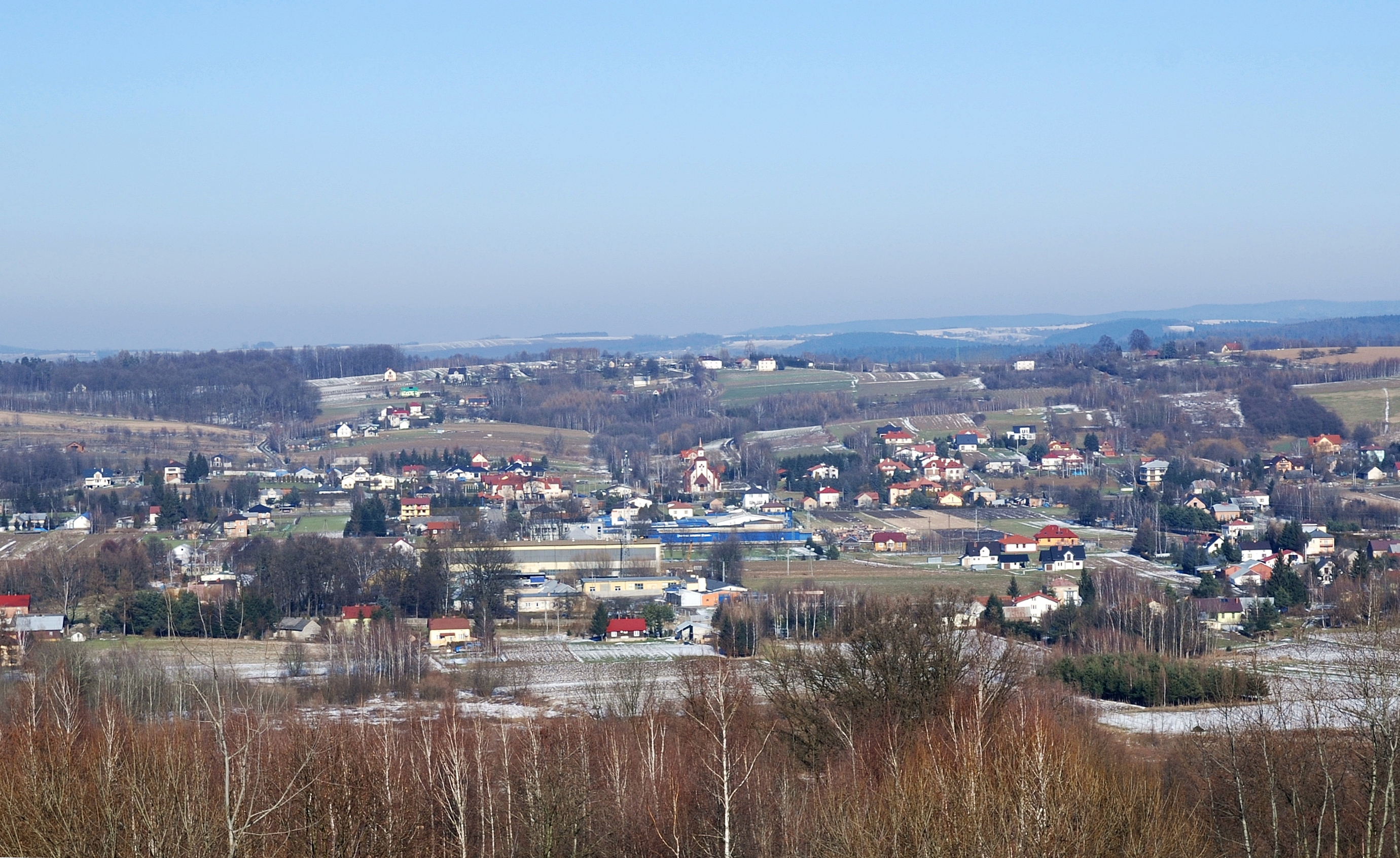

- Location within Poland
- Coordinates: 49°44′5″N 21°22′30″E
- Country: Poland
- Voivodeship: Subcarpathian
- County: Jasło
- Gmina: Skołyszyn

Area
  - Total: 6,203 ha (15,330 acres)

Population
  - Total: 1,607
- Time zone: UTC+1 (CET)
  - Summer (DST): UTC+2 (CEST)
- Vehicle registration: RJS

Przysieki [pʂɨˈɕɛki] is a village in the administrative district of Gmina Skołyszyn, within Jasło County, Subcarpathian Voivodeship, in south-eastern Poland. Its population as of 2019 is 1607 people, up from a population of 1545 in 2002. It covers an area of 620,3 hectares.

== History ==
The village was founded 1 December 1364 by King Casimir III the Great. Przysieki were mentioned by the medieval historian Jan Długosz in his writings.

On 2 February 1943, during World War II, a train fuel cistern exploded near the train station. Three people were executed in reprisals by the Gestapo. A memorial was unveiled in 1985 (picture below).

Zuzanna Stusowska (1866–1973) the oldest Polish citizen in the early 1970s lived in the village.

== Religion ==
The dominant religion is Roman Catholicism, the village is split between Saint Catherine's Parish in Sławęcin and the Parish of the Transfiguration in Trzcinica, and lies in the Roman Catholic Diocese of Rzeszów.

== Gallery ==
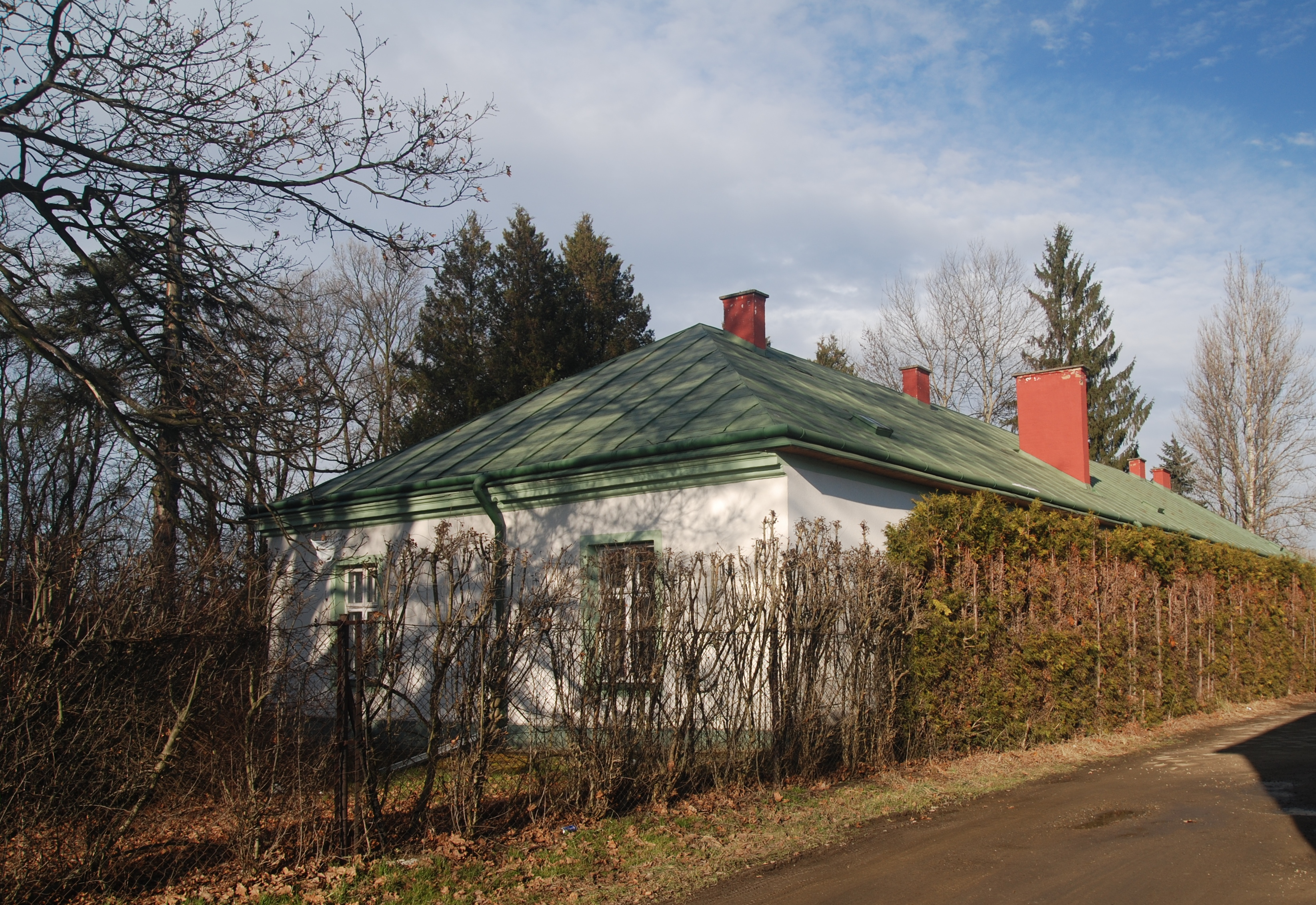
Historic House

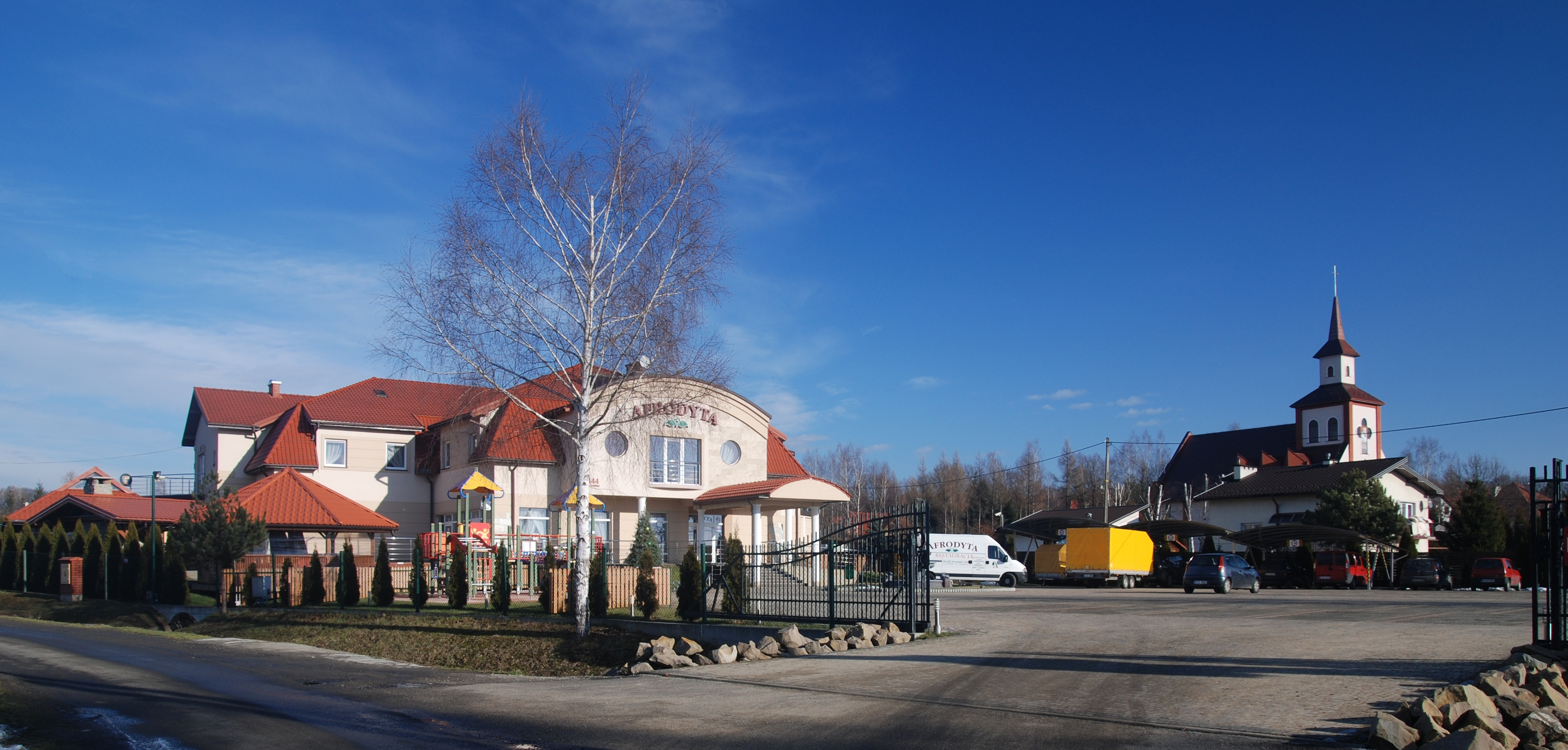
Hotel "Afrodyta"

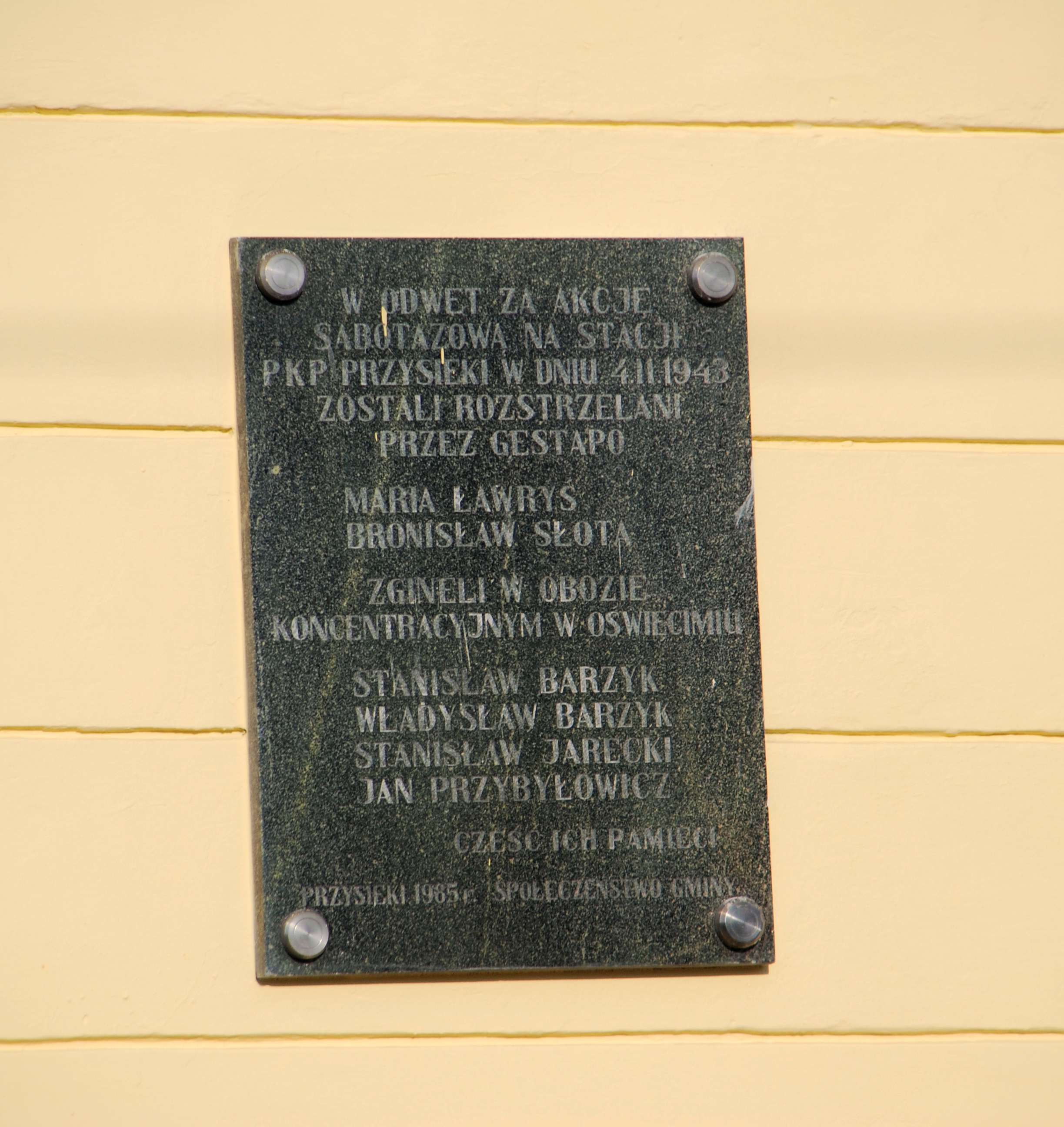
Memorial to the people killed in reprisals relating to the explosion of the fuel cistern.

== Bibliography ==
- Irena Becla, Lata niezmarnowane, Trzcinica-Krosno 1995
- Jan Gancarski, Trzcinica-Karpacka Troja, Krosno 2011, ISBN 978-83-923562-3-3
- Józef Garbacik – redakcja, Studia z dziejów Jasła i powiatu jasielskiego, PWN Kraków 1964
- Wiesław Hap, Ziemia Jasielska naszą Małą Ojczyzną, Jasło 2014, wyd.II, ISBN 978-83-63105-04-4
