= Dąbrówka Tuchowska =

- Village
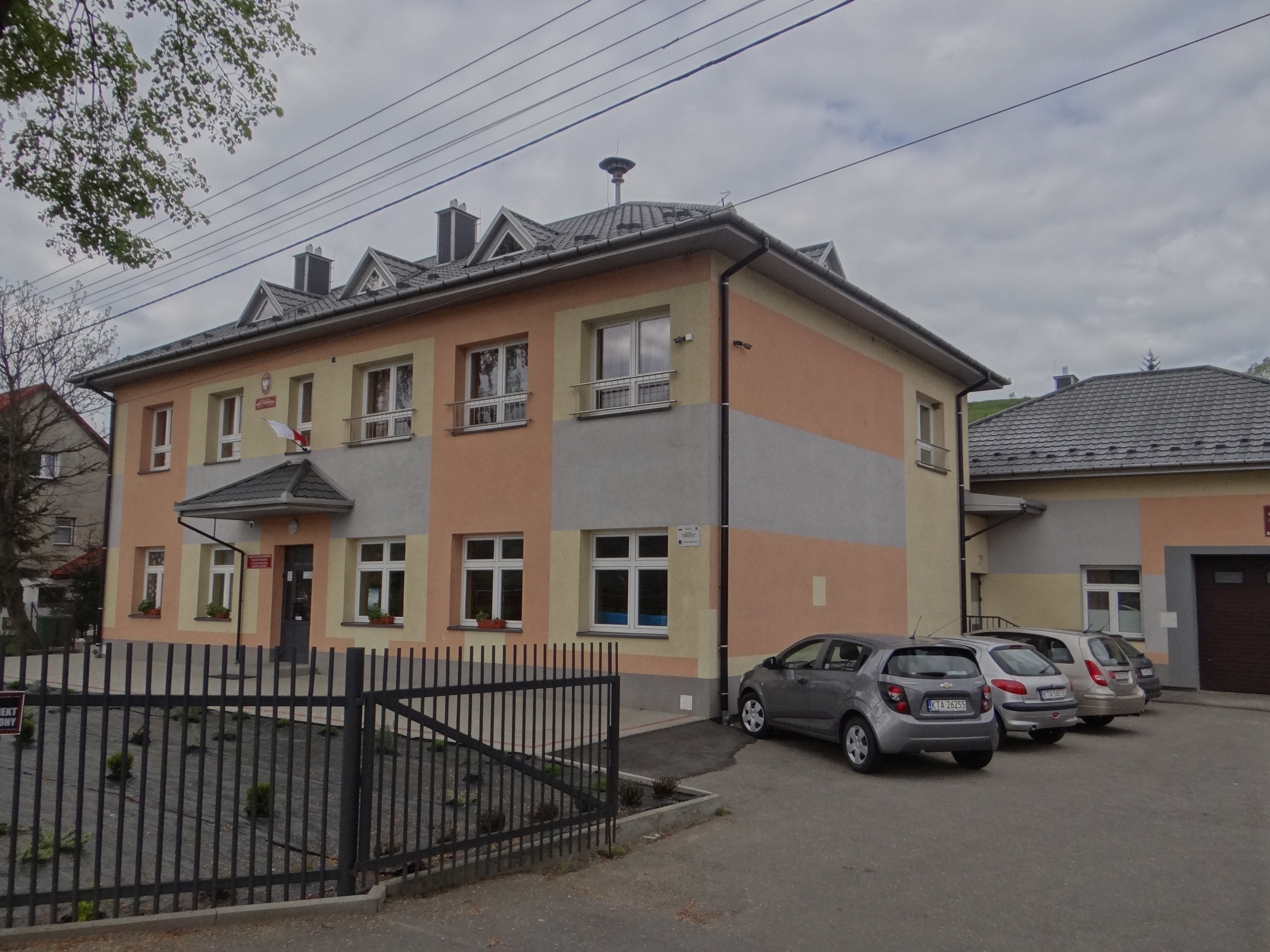
- School

- Location within Poland
- Coordinates: 49°52′N 21°3′E
- Country: Poland
- Voivodeship: Lesser Poland
- County: Tarnów
- Gmina: Tuchów

Dąbrówka Tuchowska [dɔmˈbrufka tuˈxɔfska] is a village in the administrative district of Gmina Tuchów, within Tarnów County, Lesser Poland Voivodeship, in southern Poland.
