= Siedliska, Tarnów County =

Siedliska
- Village
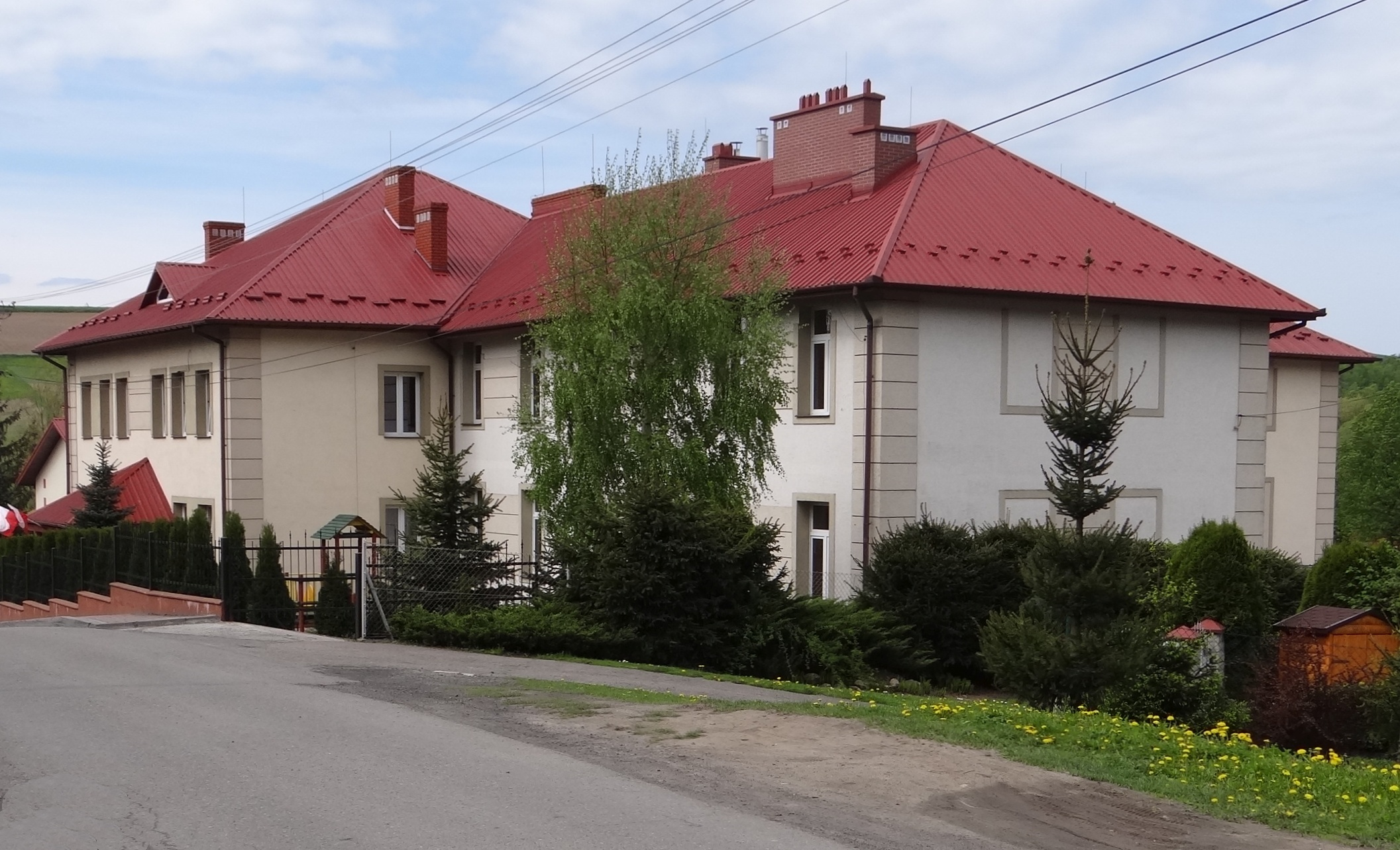
- School

- Location within Poland
- Coordinates: 49°52′N 21°0′E
- Country: Poland
- Voivodeship: Lesser Poland
- County: Tarnów
- Gmina: Tuchów
- Population: 2,500

Siedliska [ɕɛdˈlʲiska] is a village in the administrative district of Gmina Tuchów, within Tarnów County, Lesser Poland Voivodeship, in southern Poland.
