= Jodłówka Tuchowska =

- Village
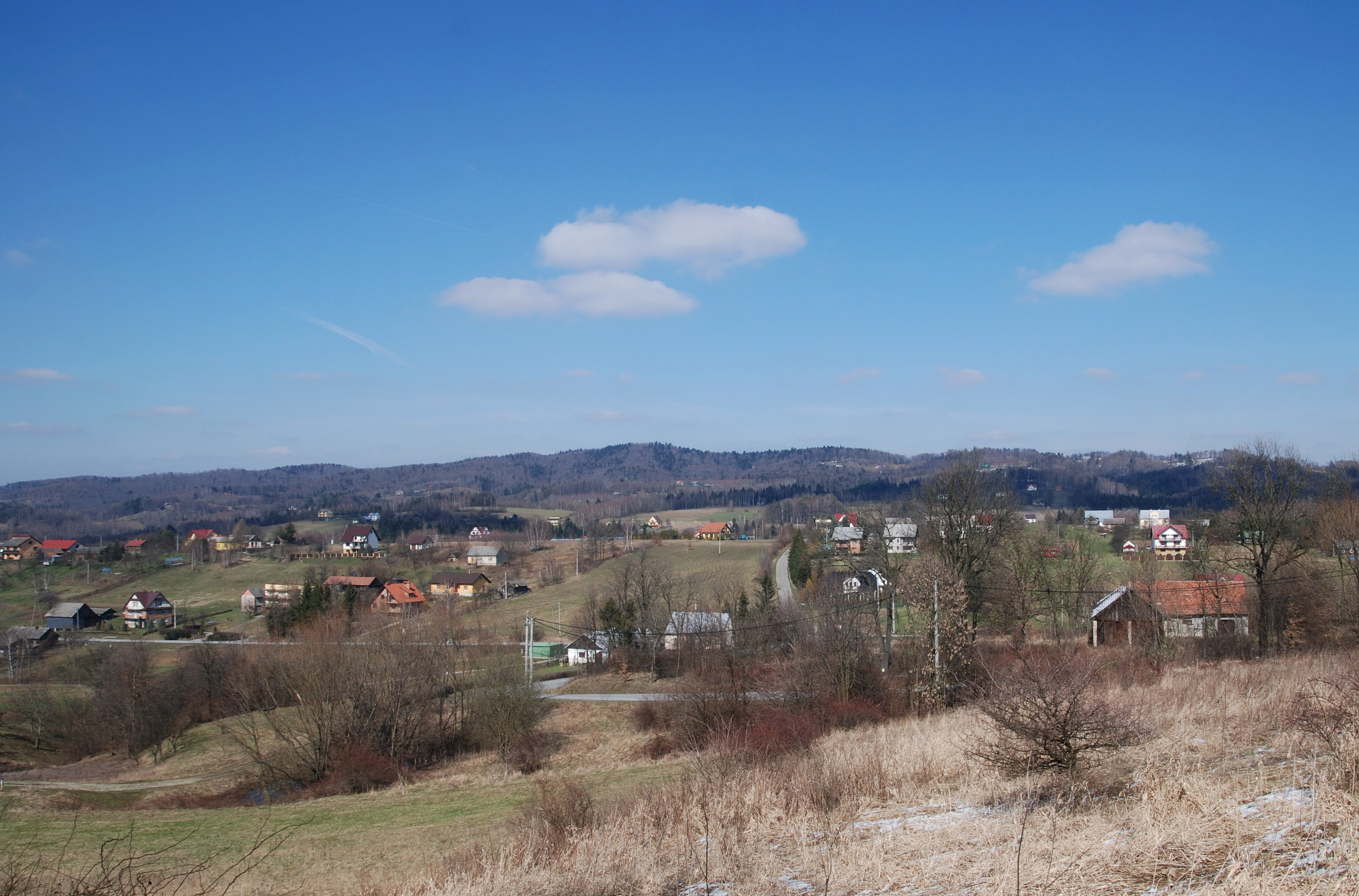

- Location within Poland
- Coordinates: 49°49′18″N 21°5′12″E
- Country: Poland
- Voivodeship: Lesser Poland
- County: Tarnów
- Gmina: Tuchów
- Highest elevation: 500 m (1,600 ft)
- Lowest elevation: 300 m (980 ft)
- Population: 1,317 (2,011)

Jodłówka Tuchowska [jɔdˈwufka tuˈxɔfska] is a village in the administrative district of Gmina Tuchów, within Tarnów County, Lesser Poland Voivodeship, in southern Poland.
