= Siepietnica =

- Village
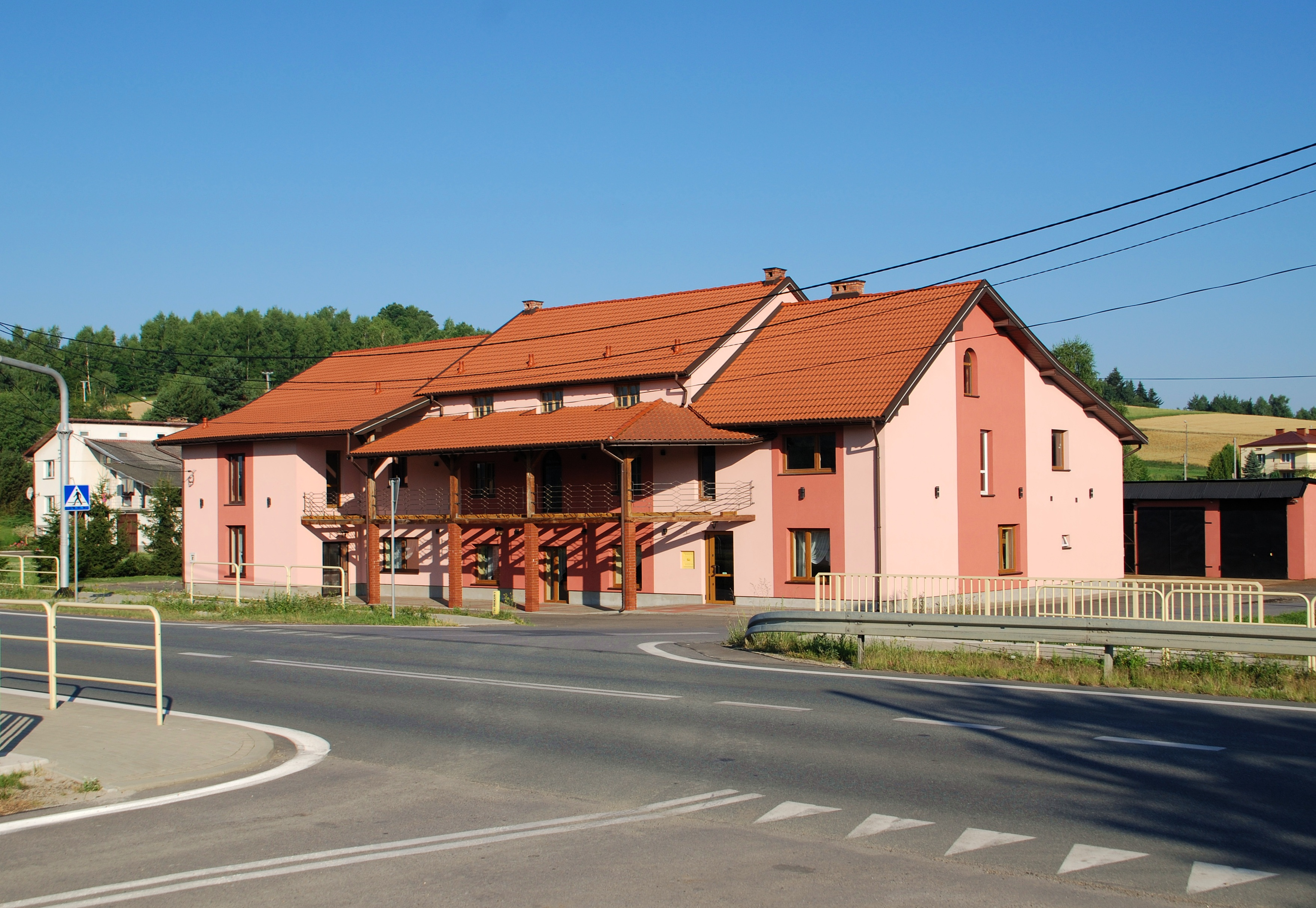

- Location within Poland
- Coordinates: 49°45′55″N 21°17′25″E
- Country: Poland
- Voivodeship: Subcarpathian
- County: Jasło
- Gmina: Skołyszyn

Population
  - Total: 474
- Time zone: UTC+1 (CET)
  - Summer (DST): UTC+2 (CEST)
- Vehicle registration: RJS
- Website: http://siepietnica.pl/

Siepietnica [ɕɛpjɛtˈnit͡sa] is a village in the administrative district of Gmina Skołyszyn, within Jasło County, Subcarpathian Voivodeship, in south-eastern Poland.

Four Polish citizens were murdered by Nazi Germany in the village during World War II.
