= Żurowa =

- Village
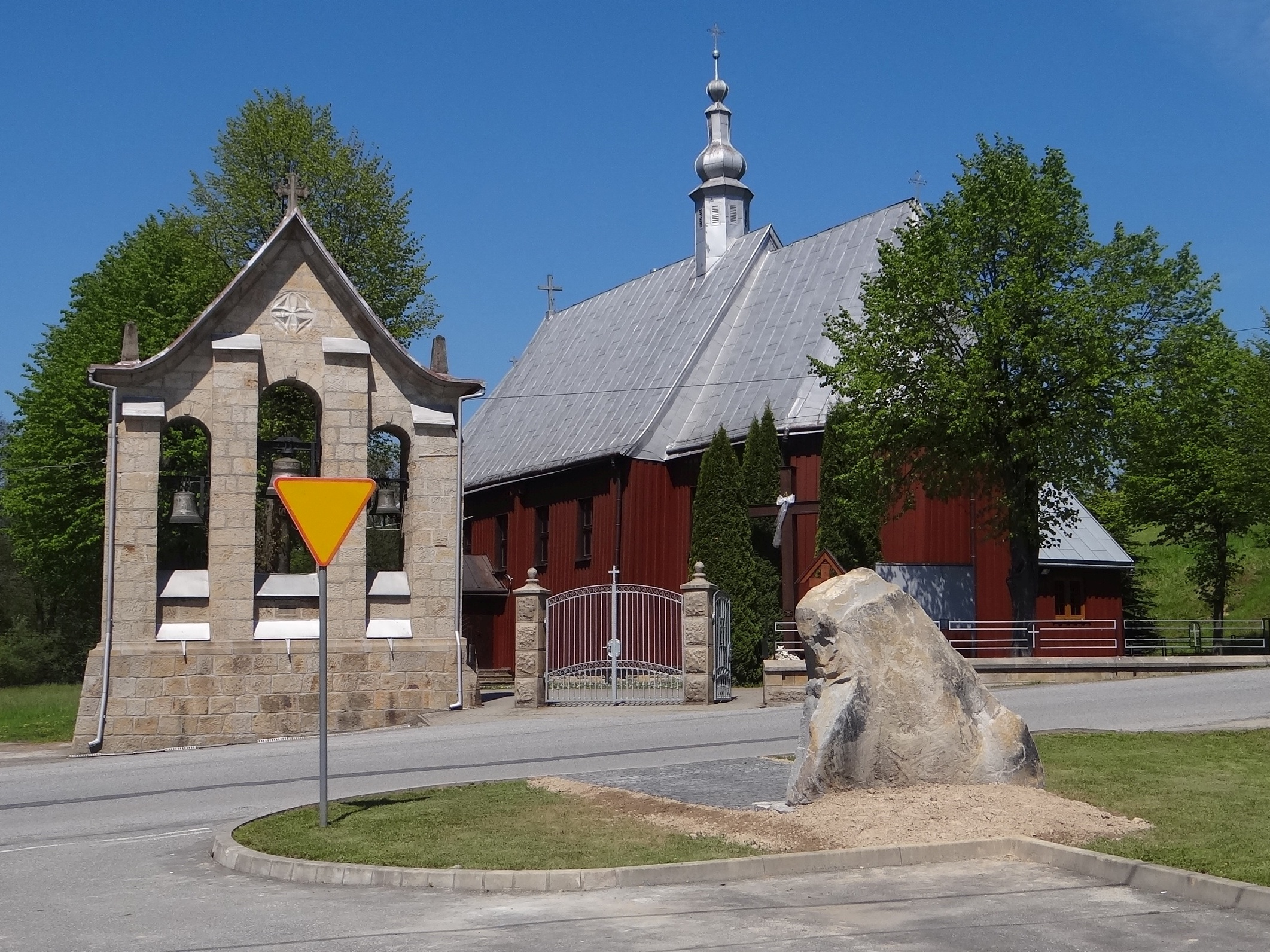
- Church of Saint Margaret

- Location within Poland
- Coordinates: 49°50′N 21°10′E
- Country: Poland
- Voivodeship: Lesser Poland
- County: Tarnów
- Gmina: Szerzyny

Żurowa [ʐuˈrɔva] is a village in the administrative district of Gmina Szerzyny, within Tarnów County, Lesser Poland Voivodeship, in southern Poland.
