= Swoszowa =

- Village
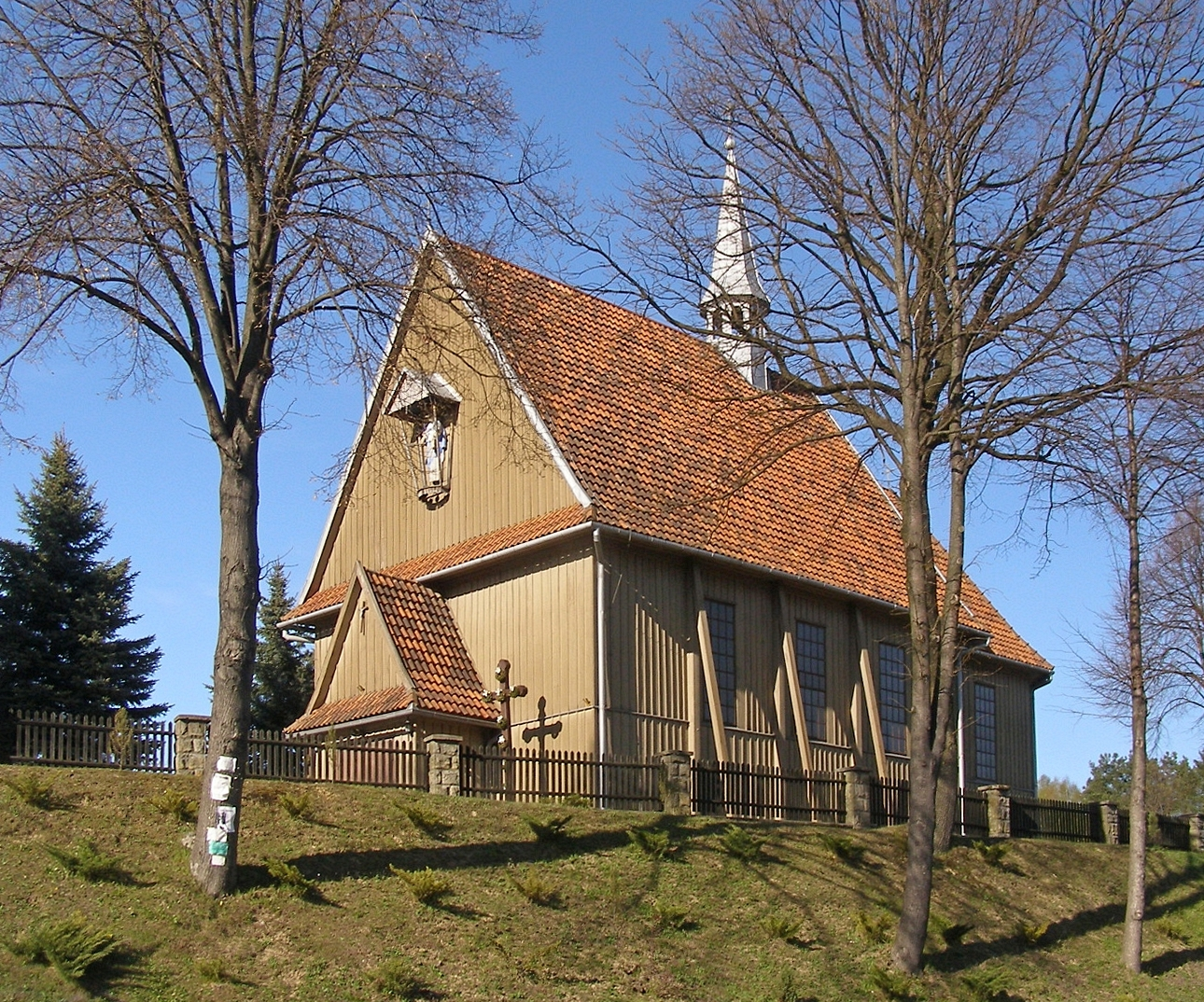
- Church of Our Lady the Queen of Poland

- Location within Poland
- Coordinates: 49°51′N 21°14′E
- Country: Poland
- Voivodeship: Lesser Poland
- County: Tarnów
- Gmina: Szerzyny

Swoszowa [sfɔˈʂɔva] is a village in the administrative district of Gmina Szerzyny, within Tarnów County, Lesser Poland Voivodeship, in southern Poland.
