= Święcany =

- Village
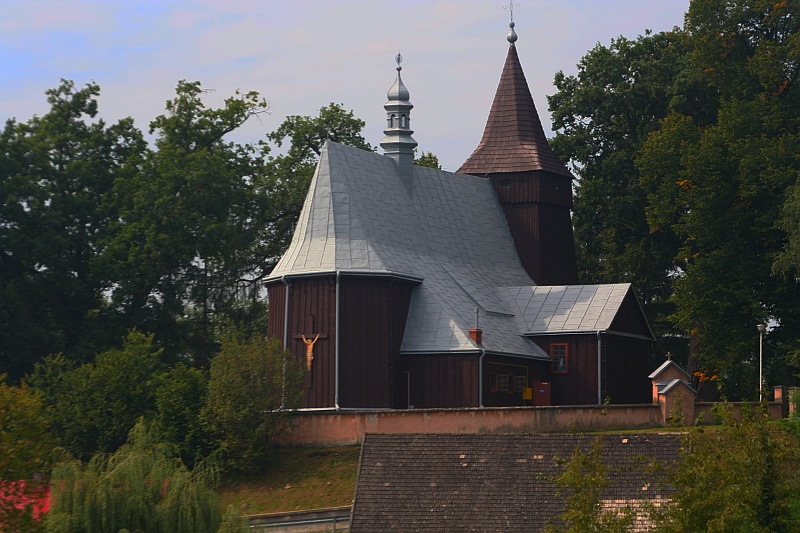
- Saint Anne Church

- Location within Poland
- Coordinates: 49°46′N 21°17′E
- Country: Poland
- Voivodeship: Subcarpathian
- County: Jasło
- Gmina: Skołyszyn
- Elevation: 365 m (1,198 ft)
- Population: 3,000

Święcany (Polish pronunciation: [ɕfjɛnˈt͡sanɨ]) is a village in the administrative district of Gmina Skołyszyn, within Jasło County, Subcarpathian Voivodeship, in south-eastern Poland.
