= Burzyn, Lesser Poland Voivodeship =

Burzyn
- Village
- Location within Poland
- Coordinates: 49°52′N 21°4′E
- Country: Poland
- Voivodeship: Lesser Poland
- County: Tarnów
- Gmina: Tuchów

Burzyn [ˈbuʐɨn] is a village in the administrative district of Gmina Tuchów, within Tarnów County, Lesser Poland Voivodeship, in southern Poland.
