= Church of St. Dorothy in Trzcinica =

Roman Catholic church

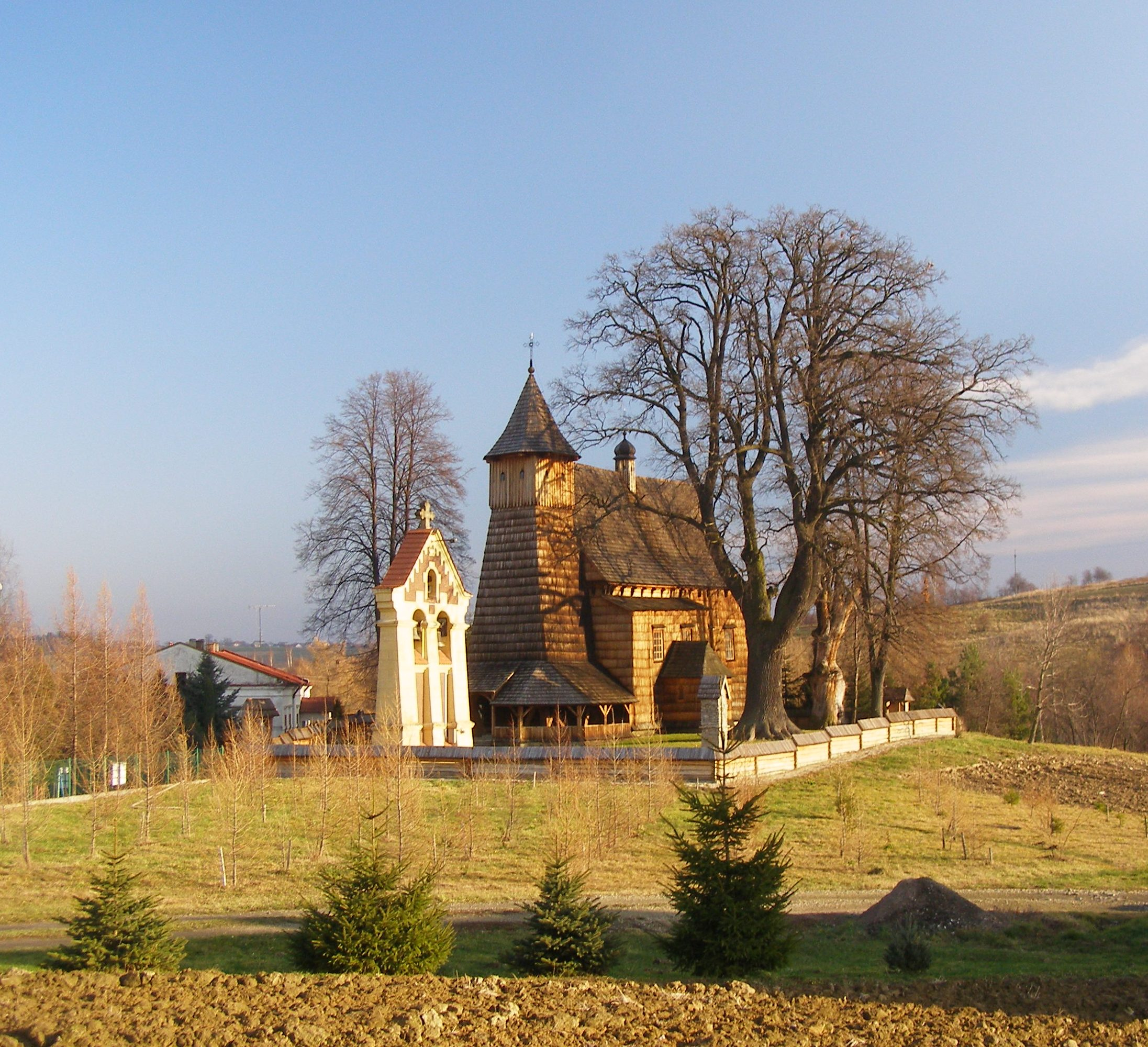

Religion
- Affiliation: Roman Catholic
- Province: Diocese of Rzeszów

Location
- Location: Trzcinica, Poland
- Interactive map of Church of St. Dorothy in Trzcinica
- Coordinates: 49°46′N 21°24′E

Architecture
- Style: Gothic

The Church of St. Dorothy in Trzcinica – is a Roman Catholic, gothic, wooden, filial church. It belongs to the Parish of the Transfiguration in Trzcinica. It is classified as an Object of Cultural Heritage. The church is located in the Podkarpacie Voivodeship, in the village of Trzcinica. The patron saint of the church is Saint Dorothea of Caesarea. There is a similar church located in nearby Bączal Dolny - St. Nicholas' Church.

== History ==
The current church was built in 1551, and consecrated 5 February 1557. It is one of the oldest churches in Poland. The initiator of the construction of the church was Zofia of Marszowice Gamratowa (-1573), and it was funded by Jan Ocieski (1501-1563) of the Jastrzębiec coat of arms, the starosta of Biecz, Crown Chamberlain at the court of King Sigsimund II Augustus, and the then owner of Trzcinica.

=== Restoration ===
The Church has undergone restoration works initiated in 1995.

- From 1994 to 1997- the Polychrome decorations in the church were restored.
- In 1995 – reconstruction and conservation of the tower massif.
- In 1996 – reinforcement of the foundation, supplementation of wooden building materials in the walls and shingles.
- In 1997 – maintenance of roof truss elements and covering it with shingles
- In 2000 – reconstruction of the western portal, conservation of the door leaves of the portal to the sacristy and the western portal, supplementing the late-medieval blacksmith fittings. A new wooden floor was installed, a stone floor was laid under the tower and under the arcade, reconstruction of the wooden fence around the church cemetery.

== Architecture ==
The church is built in wooden, gothic style. The church is characterized by its exceptional slenderness and harmonious proportions.

The church's features include:

- the main altar, two side altars from the 18th century, a pulpit from the second half of the 18th century and two votive paintings of St. Anna and St. Stanisław from the beginning of the 19th century, founded by Anna and Stanisław Jabłonowski, the then village owners.
- an organ from the turn of the 17th and 18th centuries.
- a gothic group of passions on a rainbow beam.
- baptismal font from the beginning of the 19th century.
- Stanisław Jabłonowski's headstone, topped with an urn in the shape of an ancient vase from 1806, placed on the southern wall of the chancel.
- Belfry from 1907.

=== Bells ===
In 1907 a brick screen belfry containing the "Florian" bell was built, bells "Paulina" and "Barbara" were acquired in 1911 as well as the bells "Stanisław" (240 kg), "Józef" (140 kg),"Barbara" (70 kg) and "Dorota" (14 kg) in 1920. All of these bells were requisitioned for war material in both 1916-1917 and 1941. Three further bells were acquired in 1952- Maryja (96 kg), Jan Chryzostom (150 kg) and Maryja Królowa Polski (242 kg). In 1995, a new, jubilee bell was cast for the parish to commemorate the 600th anniversary of the village Trzcinica. It is named after St. Dorothy, the patron of the parish. It weighs 420 kg, and delivers the tone h '. The bell was acquired by the church in 1996.

== Gallery ==
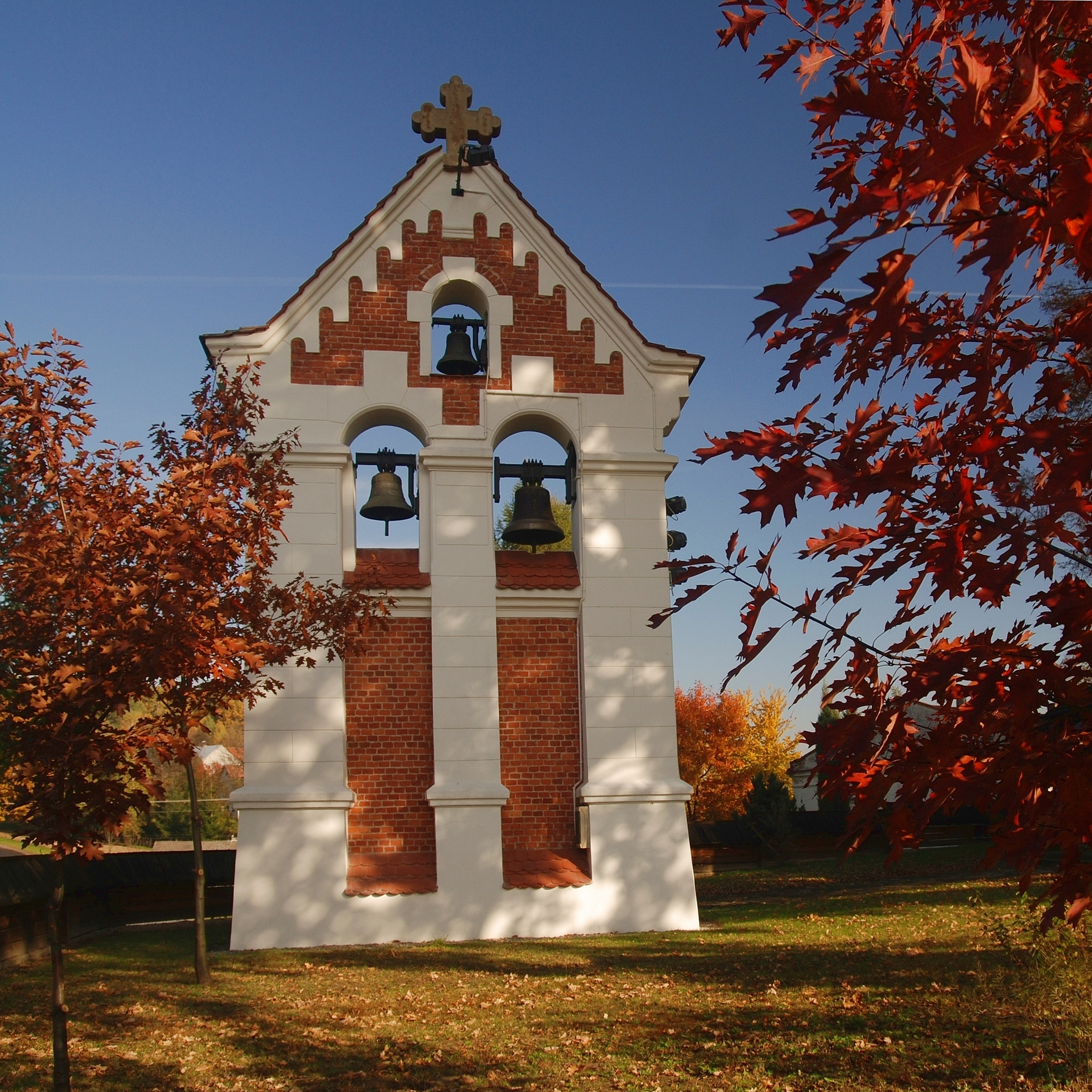
Belfry

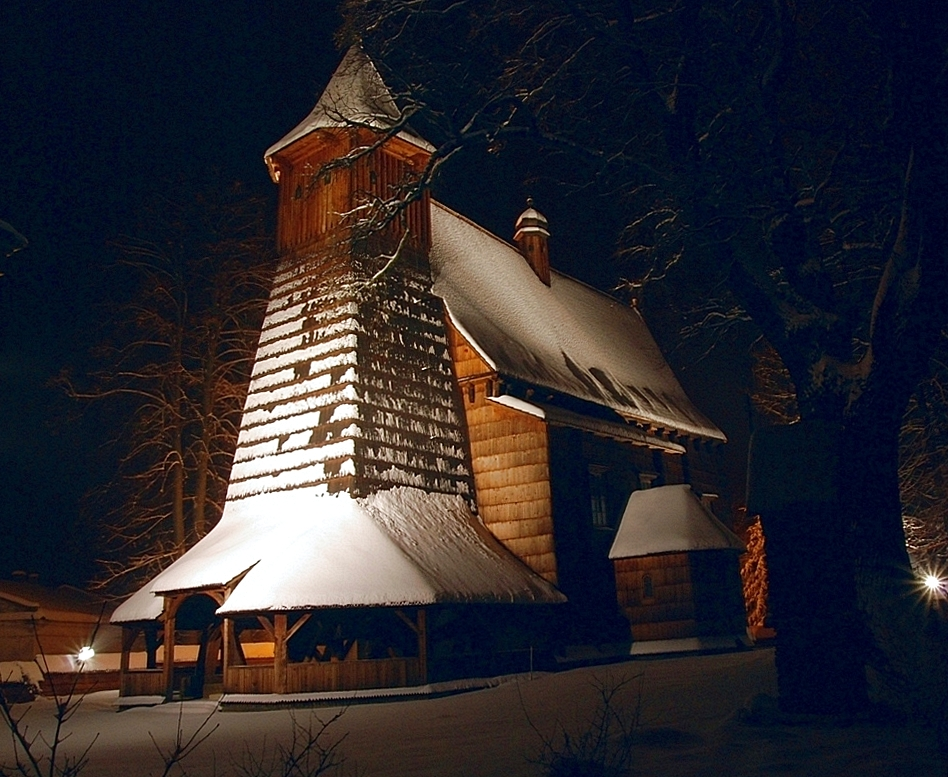
At night

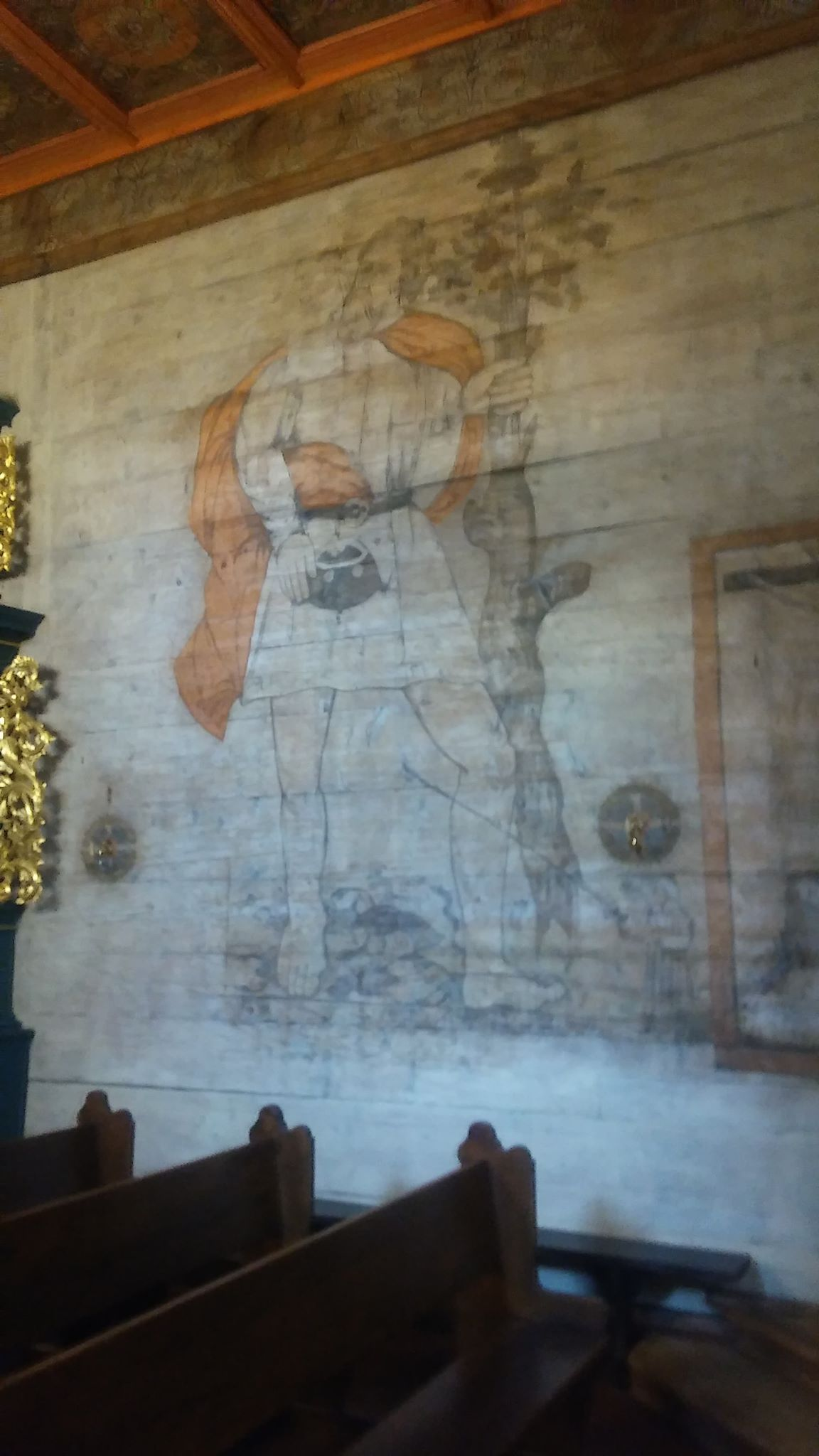
Polychrome inside of the church

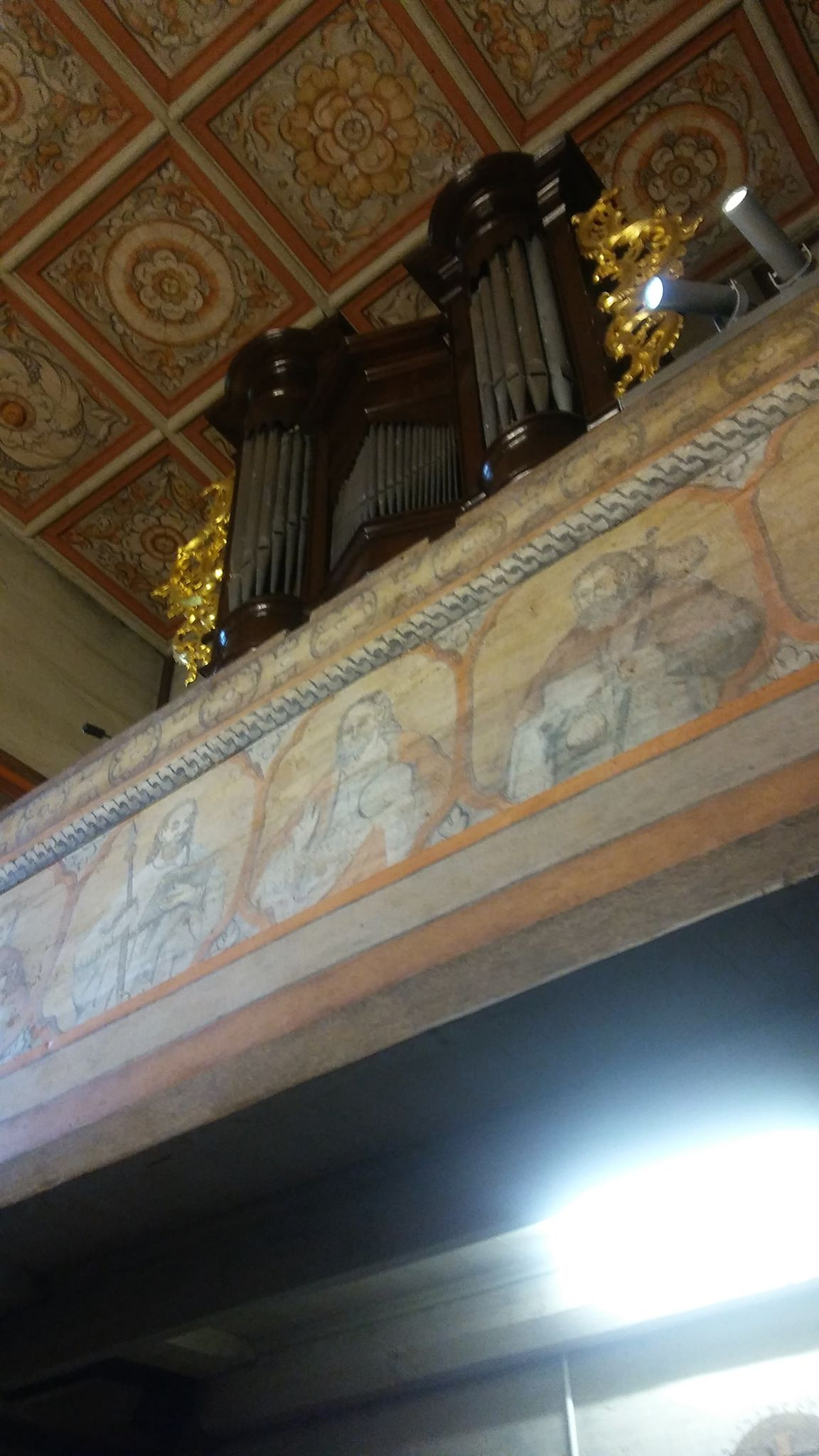
Organ inside the church

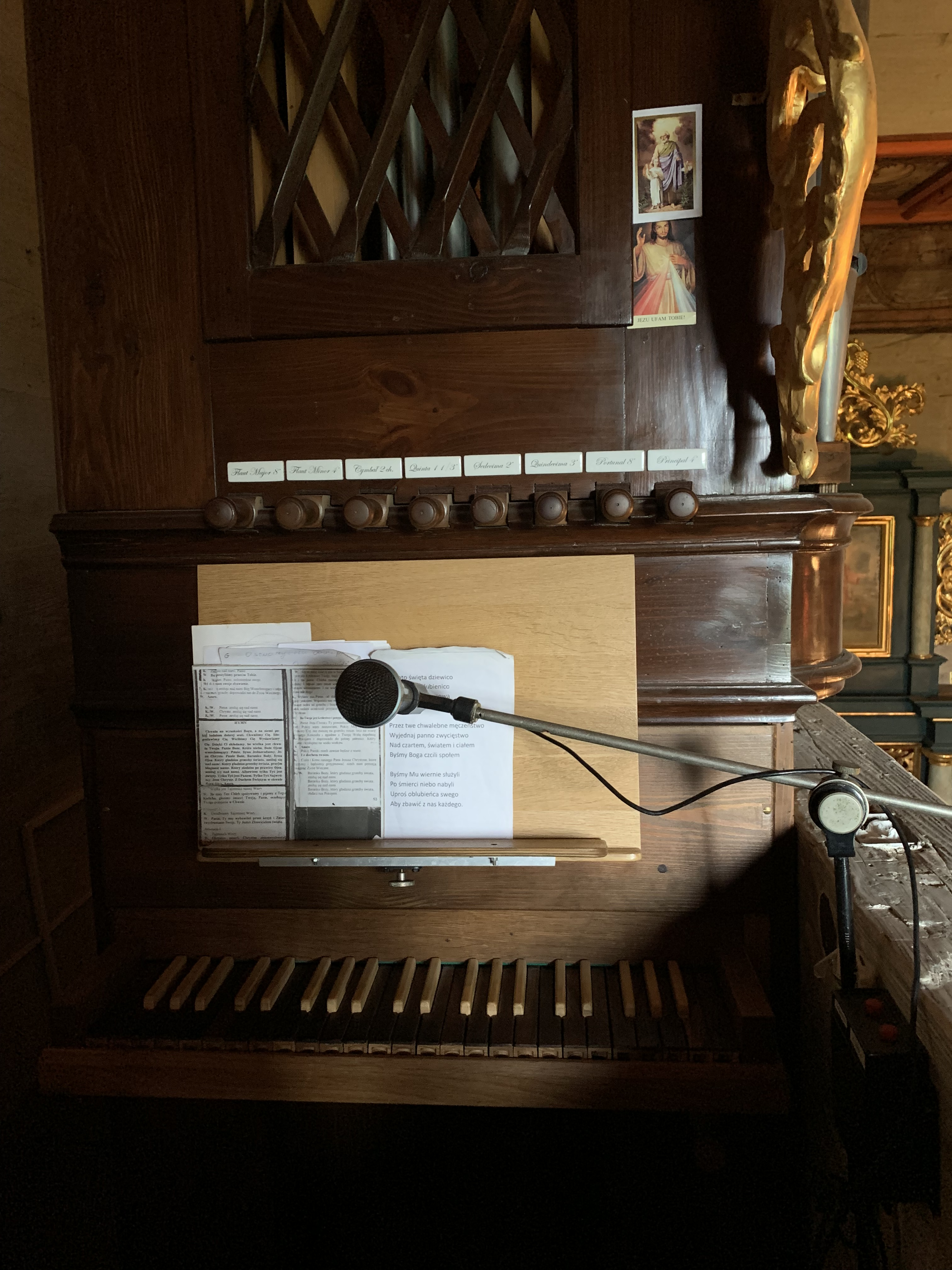
Organ keyboard

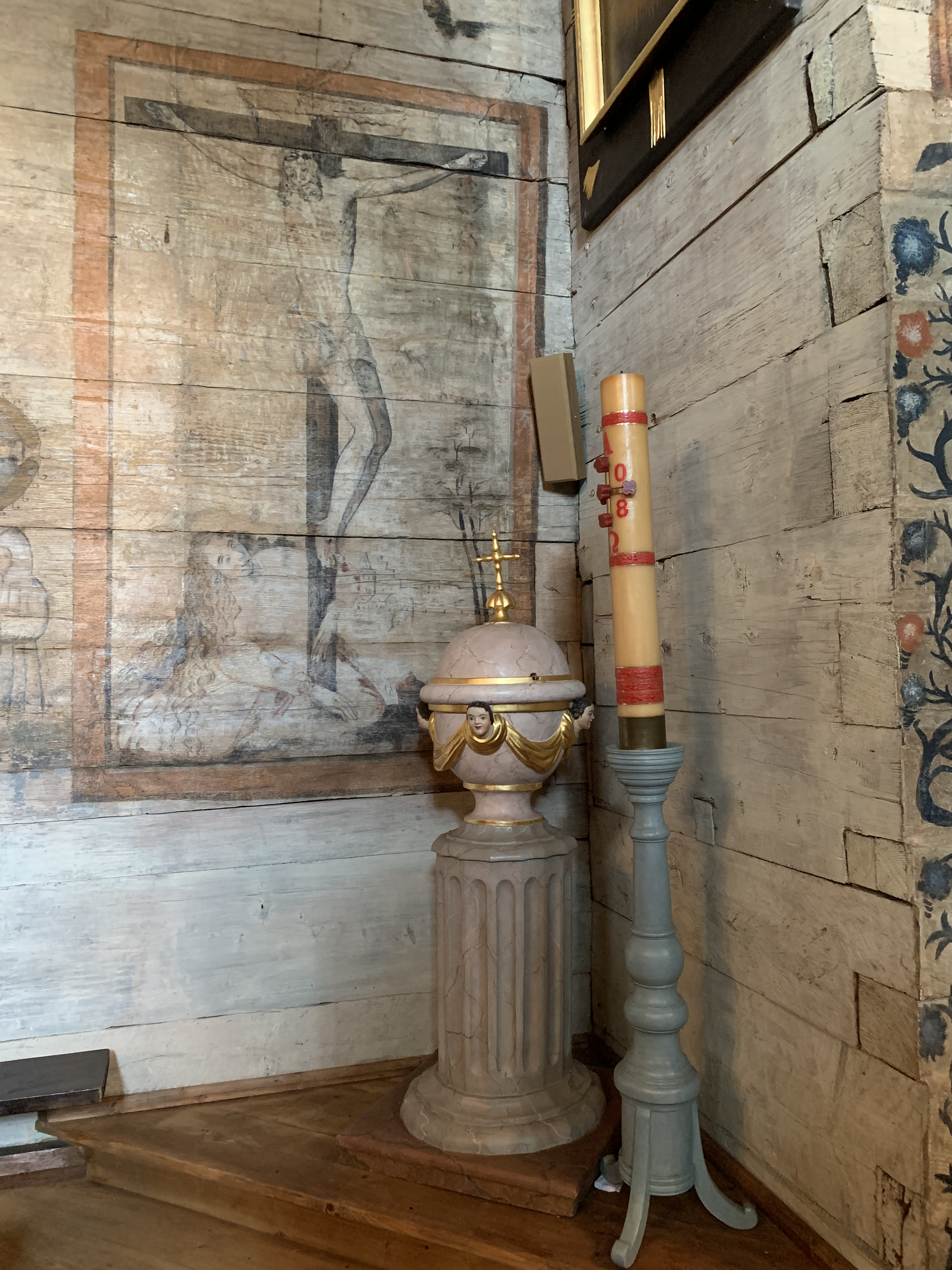
Baptismal font

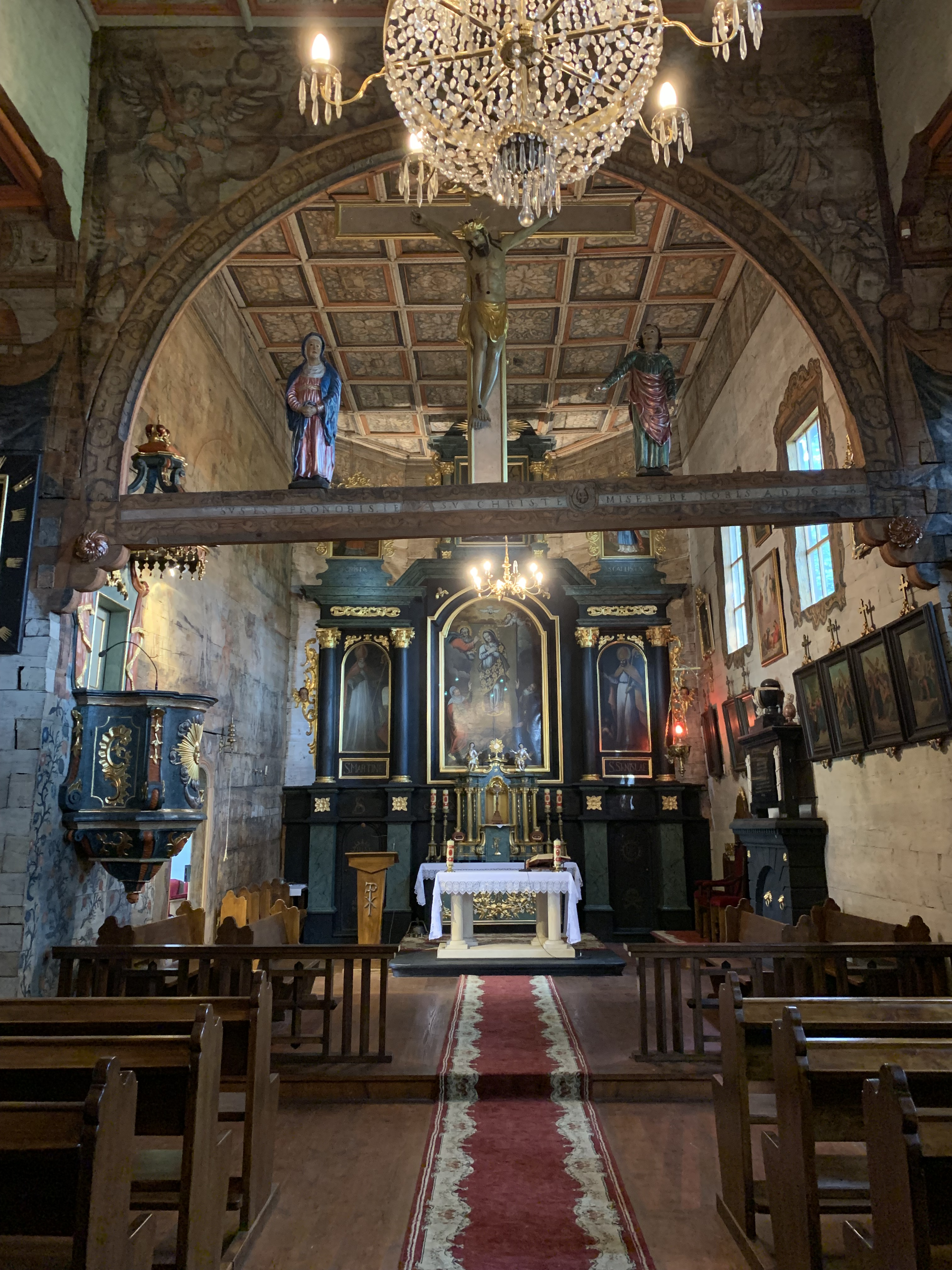
View of the main altar
