= Trzcinica, Podkarpackie Voivodeship =

Trzcinica
- Village
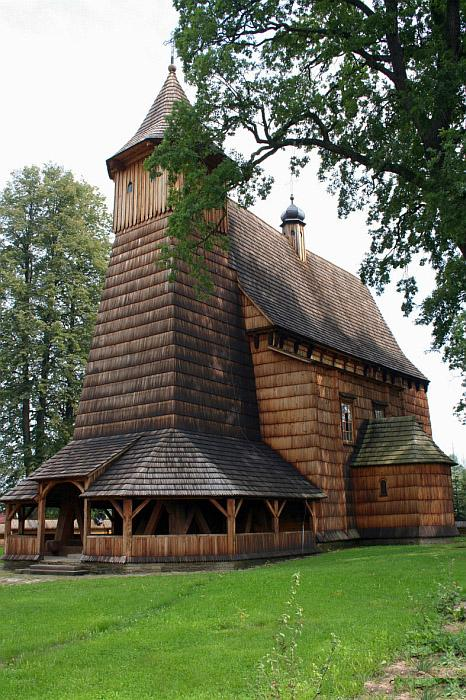
- Church of St. Dorothy from the late 15th century

- Location within Poland
- Coordinates: 49°44′31″N 21°24′57″E
- Country: Poland
- Voivodeship: Subcarpathian
- County: Jasło
- Gmina: Jasło

Trzcinica ([tʂt͡ɕiˈnit͡sa]) is a village in the administrative district of Gmina Jasło, within Jasło County, Subcarpathian Voivodeship, in south-eastern Poland.

== Archeological Trzcinica ==
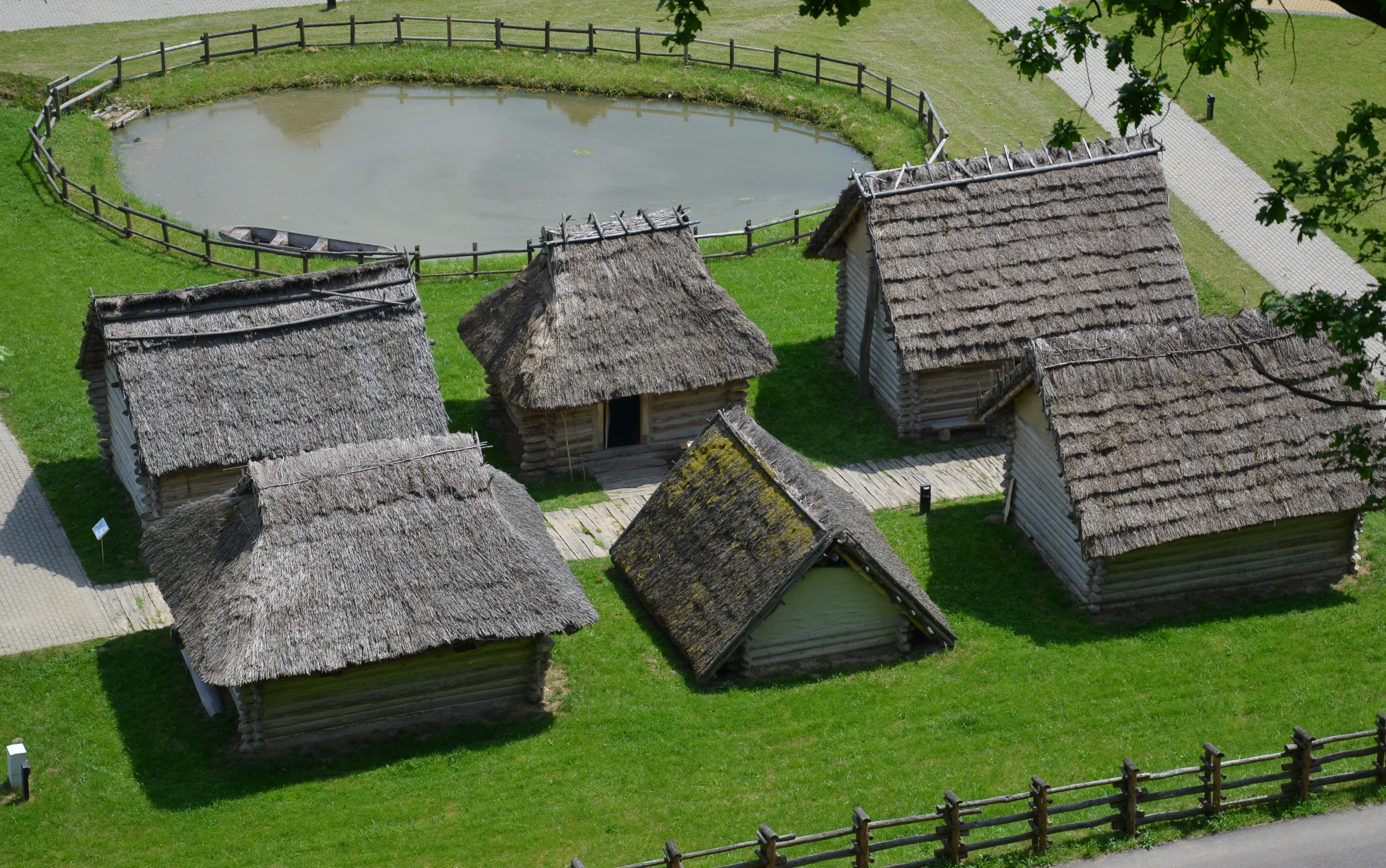
Trzcinica Bronze Age settlement

Trzcinica is the site of one of the most important settlements of the Bronze and Iron Age Poland, where around 2100 BCE. the people of the early European Bronze Age culture created a settlement, and where archeologists found, amongst 30,000 objects, artifacts showing influence of the more advanced Carpathian Basin Otomani-Fűzesabony culture – clay wheels of toy or ritual carriages, clay animal figurines. Around 1600 BCE. the Otomani peoples actually arrived, crossing the Carpathian Mountains, from present Hungary, Slovakia and Romania, and took over the existing settlement of Trzcinica, expanding the existing stronghold and fashioning a fortress known to the archaeologists as the Troy of the North. Amongst the artifacts recovered, some 60,000, there are numerous bronze objects linking the gord of Trzcinica with the Mediterranean Troy. The cumulative area of the Bronze Age Trzcinica fortress was 2 hectares, with powerful earth ramparts. Around 1300 BCE. the stronghold was abandoned. During the early Medieval period, between 770–780 CE, Slavs built a new gord, 3 hectares large, a testimony to the power of a local ruling elite. This gord's power was circumscribed or ceased to exist by the 1030s.
