= St. Nicholas' Church, Bączal Dolny =

Coordinates: 50.8600°N 17.4708°E

St. Nicholas' Church
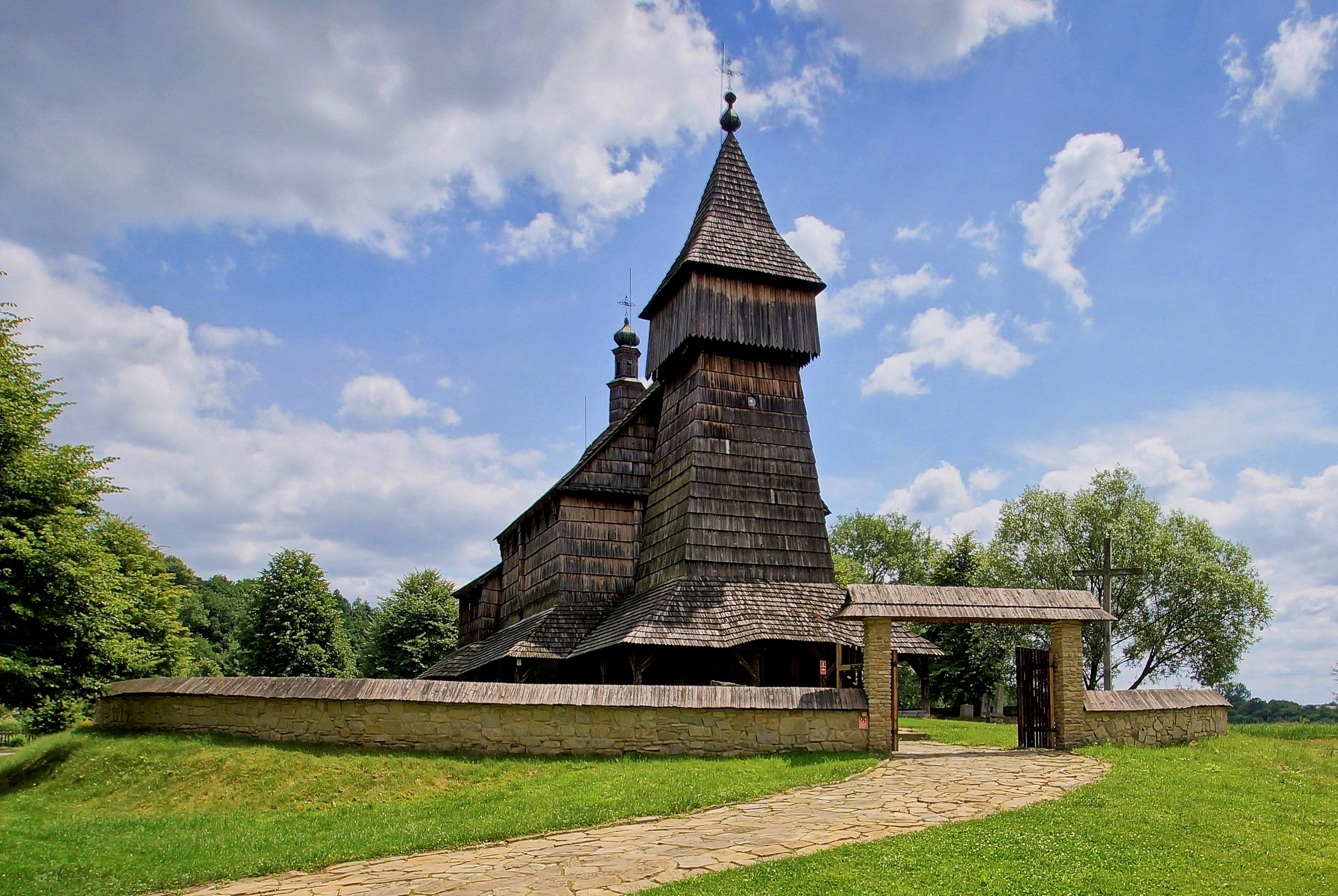
- St. Nicholas' Church
- St. Nicholas' Church
- Location: Bączal Dolny
- Country: Poland
- Denomination: Roman Catholic

History
- Founder: Jan Łętowski

Architecture
- Style: Gothic
- Completed: 1667
- Demolished: 2026 (destroyed by fire)

Specifications
- Materials: Wood

St. Nicholas' Church in Bączal Dolny, Poland, was a Gothic church from the seventeenth-century. Since the 1970s, the church was part of the Museum of Folk Architecture in Sanok.

The temple illustrated a typical Lesser Polish wooden church's architecture, and was one of the most prized buildings of religious heritage in south-eastern Poland. The rector of the church from 1939 to 1948 was Florian Zając, a chaplain of the Home Army.

The church was completely destroyed by a fire at the Museum of Folk Architecture, Sanok in the early morning hours of 16 August 2026.

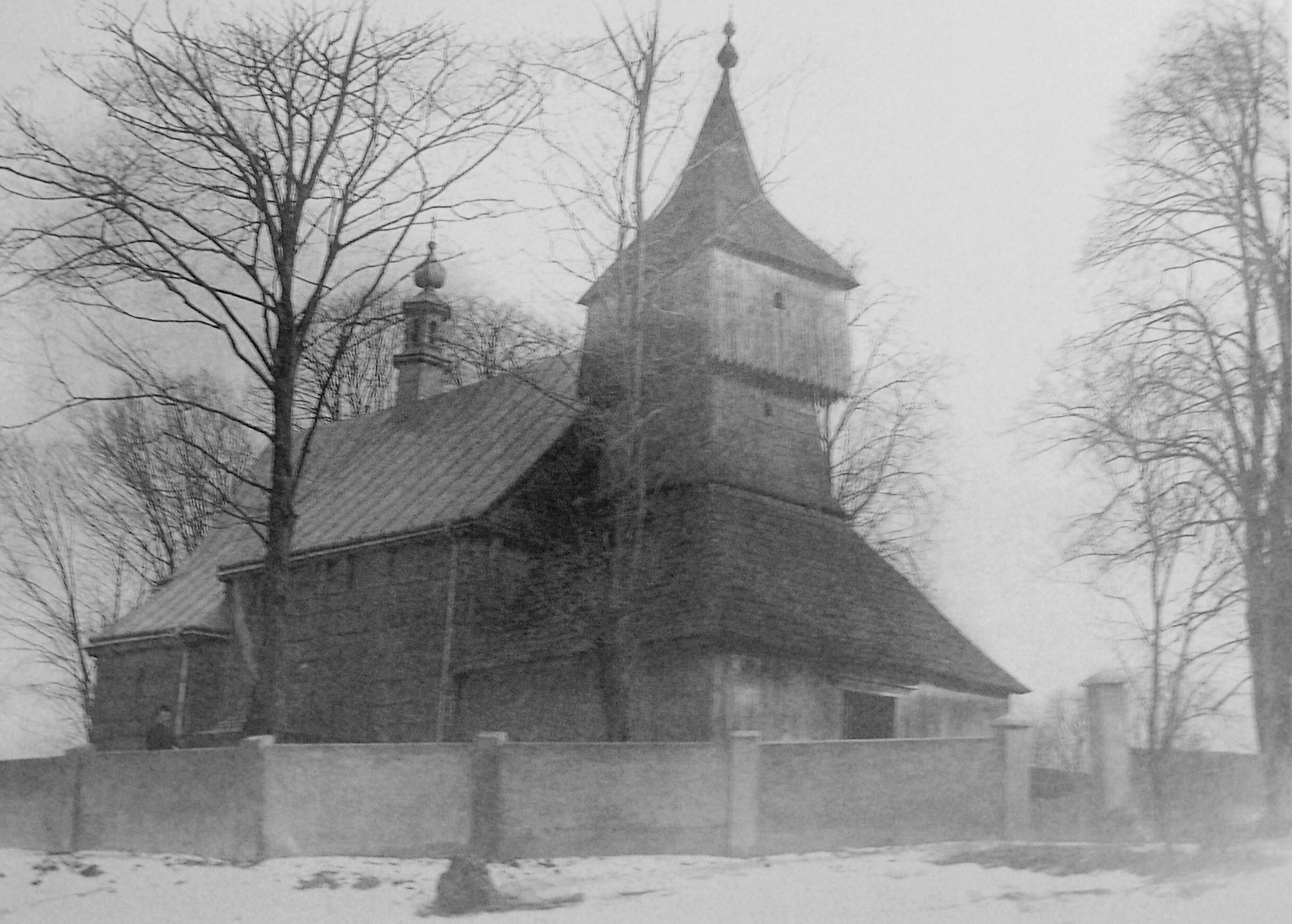
Church in Bączal Dolny in 1928

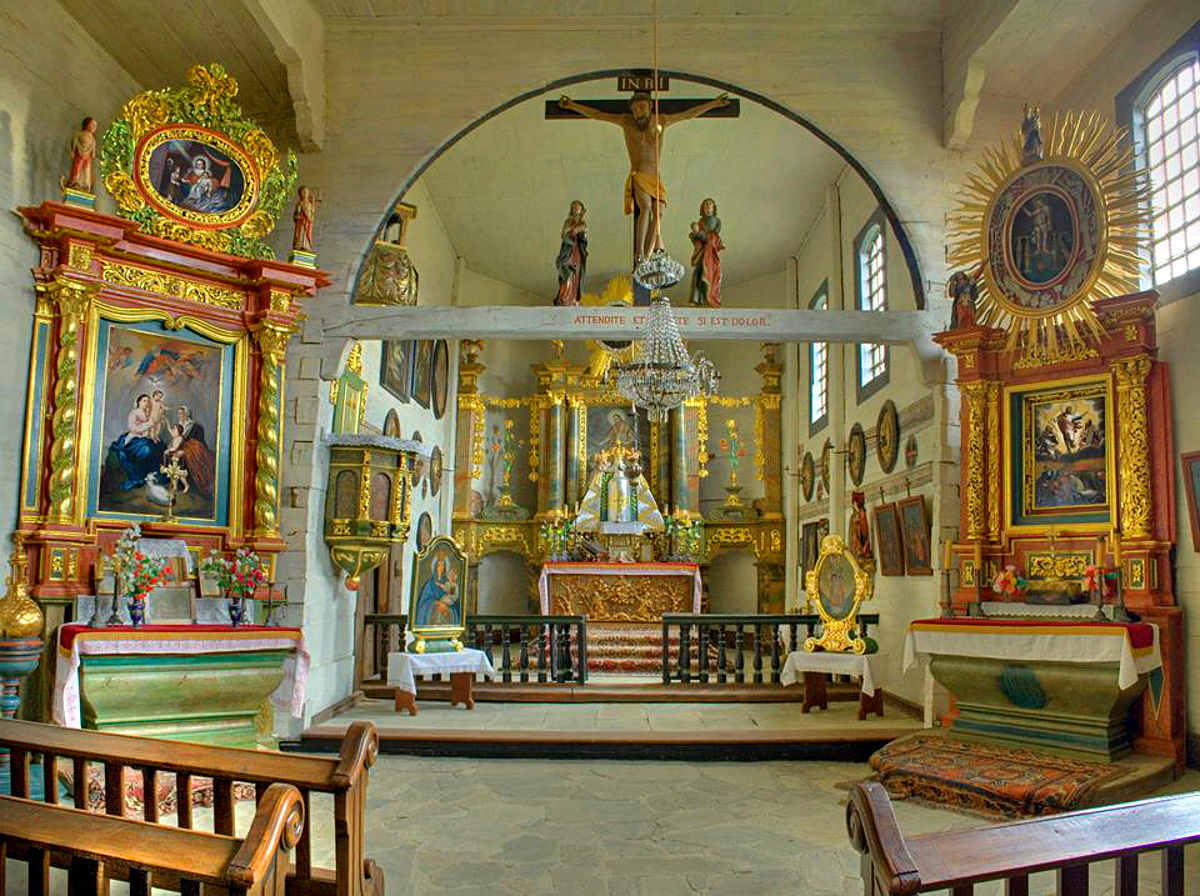
Church interior with altar

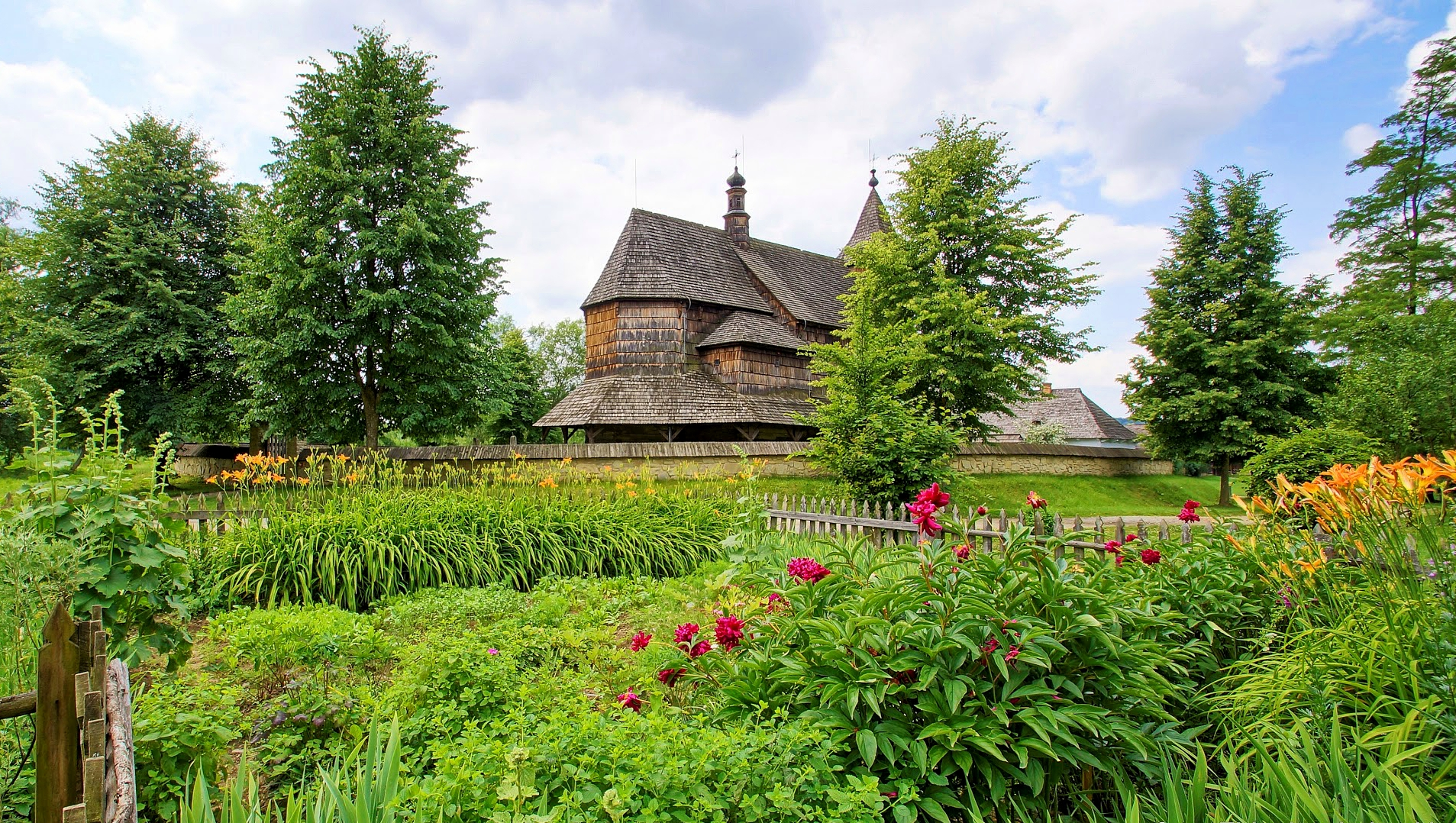
Church's environment in the summer
