= Bączal Dolny =

Village in Subcarpathian Voivodeship, Poland

- Village
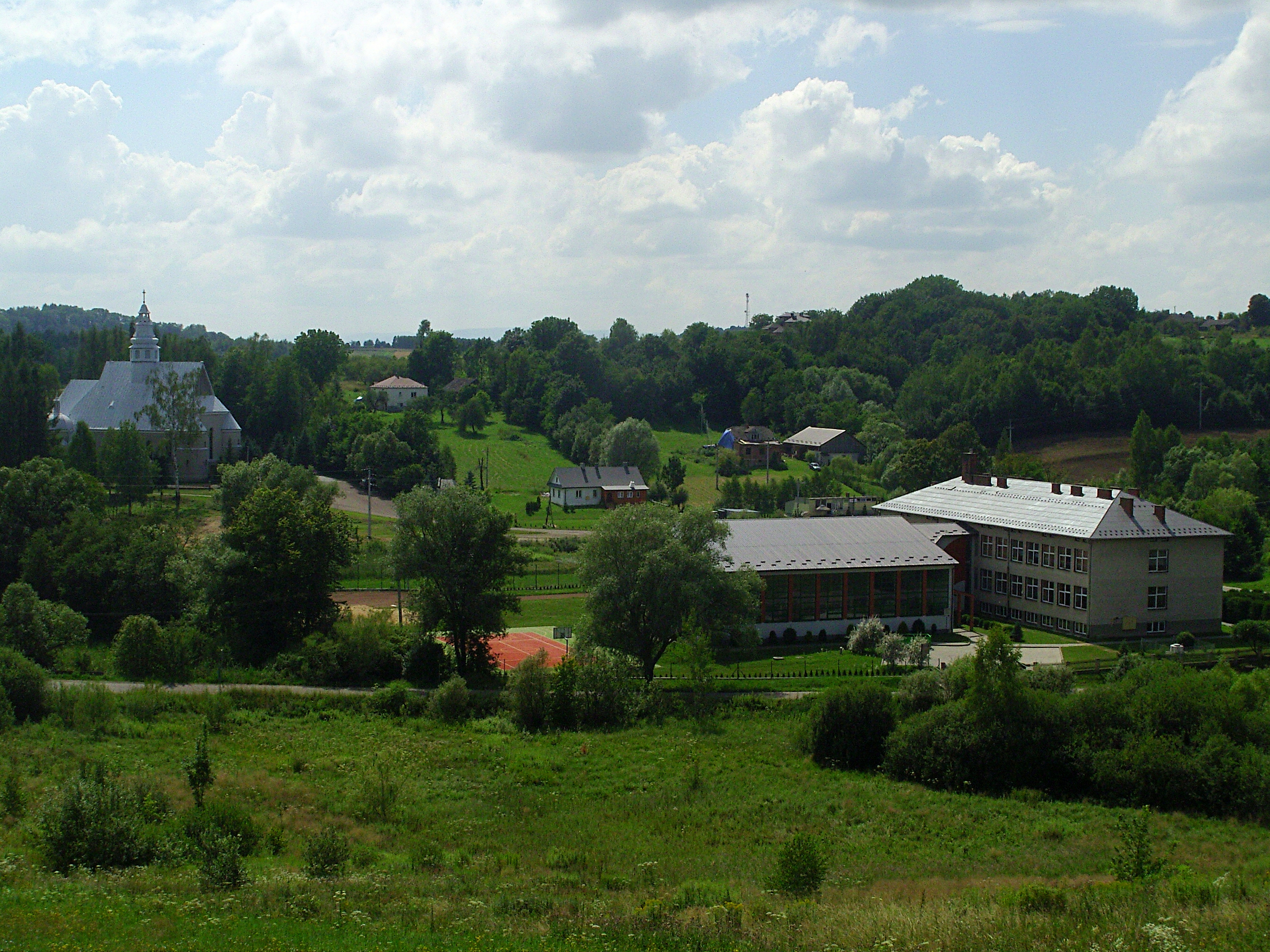
- Baczal Dolny - Centrum

- Location within Poland
- Coordinates: 49°45′32″N 21°23′13″E
- Country: Poland
- Voivodeship: Subcarpathian
- County: Jasło
- Gmina: Skołyszyn
- Population: 670

Bączal Dolny [ˈbɔnt͡ʂal ˈdɔlnɨ] is a village in the administrative district of Gmina Skołyszyn, within Jasło County, Subcarpathian Voivodeship, in south-eastern Poland.

Bączal lies in the microregion mountain Liwocz in the Carpathian Foothills.

== History ==
Bączal name probably comes from a stream called "Bączałka" passing through the center of the village or from the name Bączal.

Bączal Lower and Upper are villages founded by King Casimir the Great around 1370–1378 years. The first written mention Bączalu comes from 1124 (a document granting land to the Benedictine Tyniec), and another from 1396 on in the seventeenth century was called Lower Bączal, Bączal the minor, and Bączal Upper Bączal Higher - the two villages were villages nobility. Bączalu parish was probably in the late thirteenth century, however, the first mention dates from 1348 years. Probably there existed a church elder (a small wooden church built around 1400) than the Gothic, built in 1667 Unfortunately, was completely destroyed.

Currently, the village is the church built by the priest, Monsignor Stanislaw Actaea In 1957-1959 which is adorned with beautiful wall paintings and stained-glass windows.

== Sights ==
- St. Nicholas' Church,
- Cemetery No. 28, World War I
- The old rectory in 1923
- Statue of St. Nicholas the patron saint of the former church
- Murowana figure - one of the oldest shrines in the region, dating even the fifteenth century,

The historic church of St. Nicholas, built In 1664–1667, was transferred to the open-air museum in Sanok.
