= Niesytno Castle =

Polish castle

Coordinates: 50°54′13″N 16°00′14″E

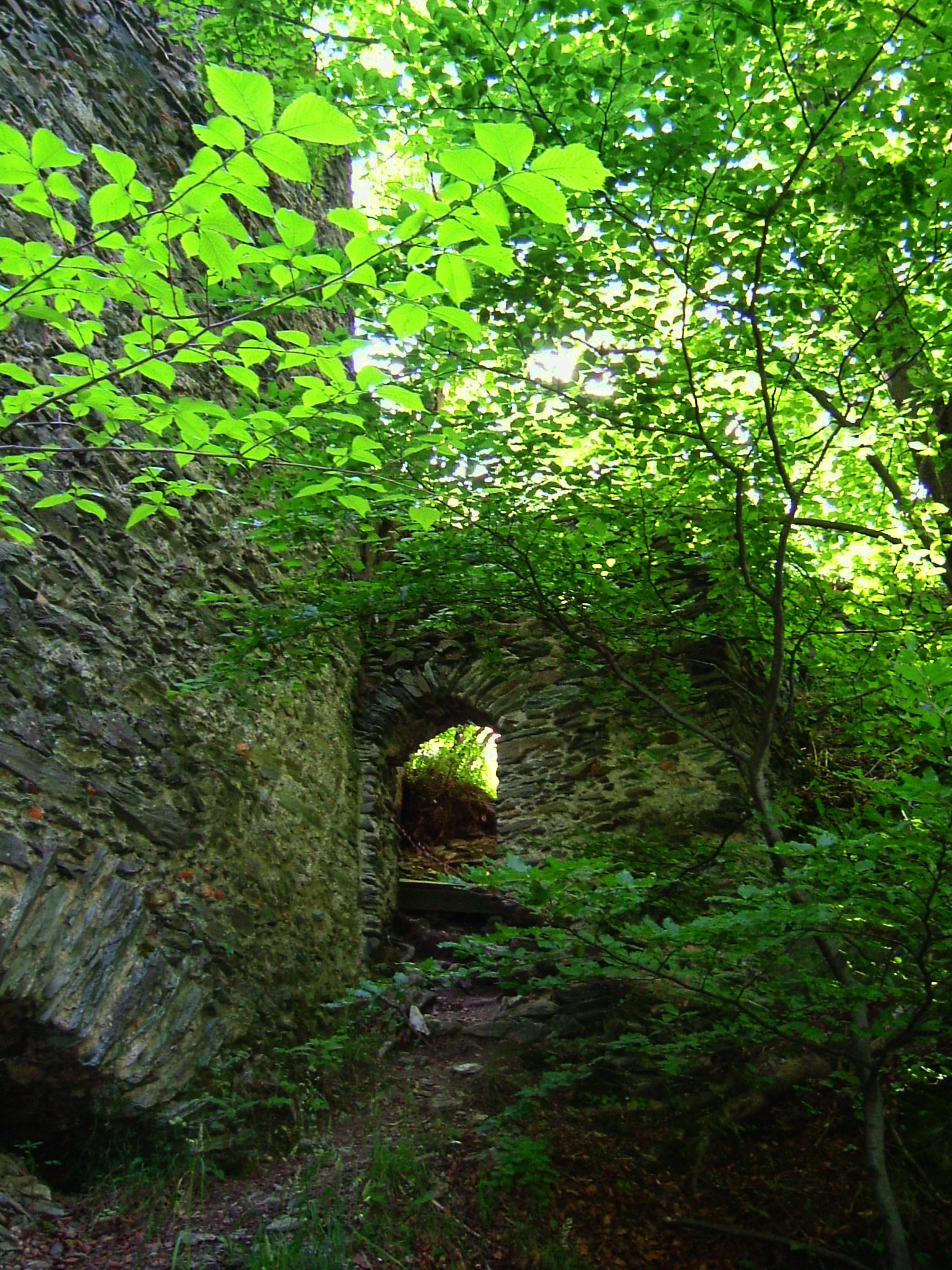
Passage to the castle's tower

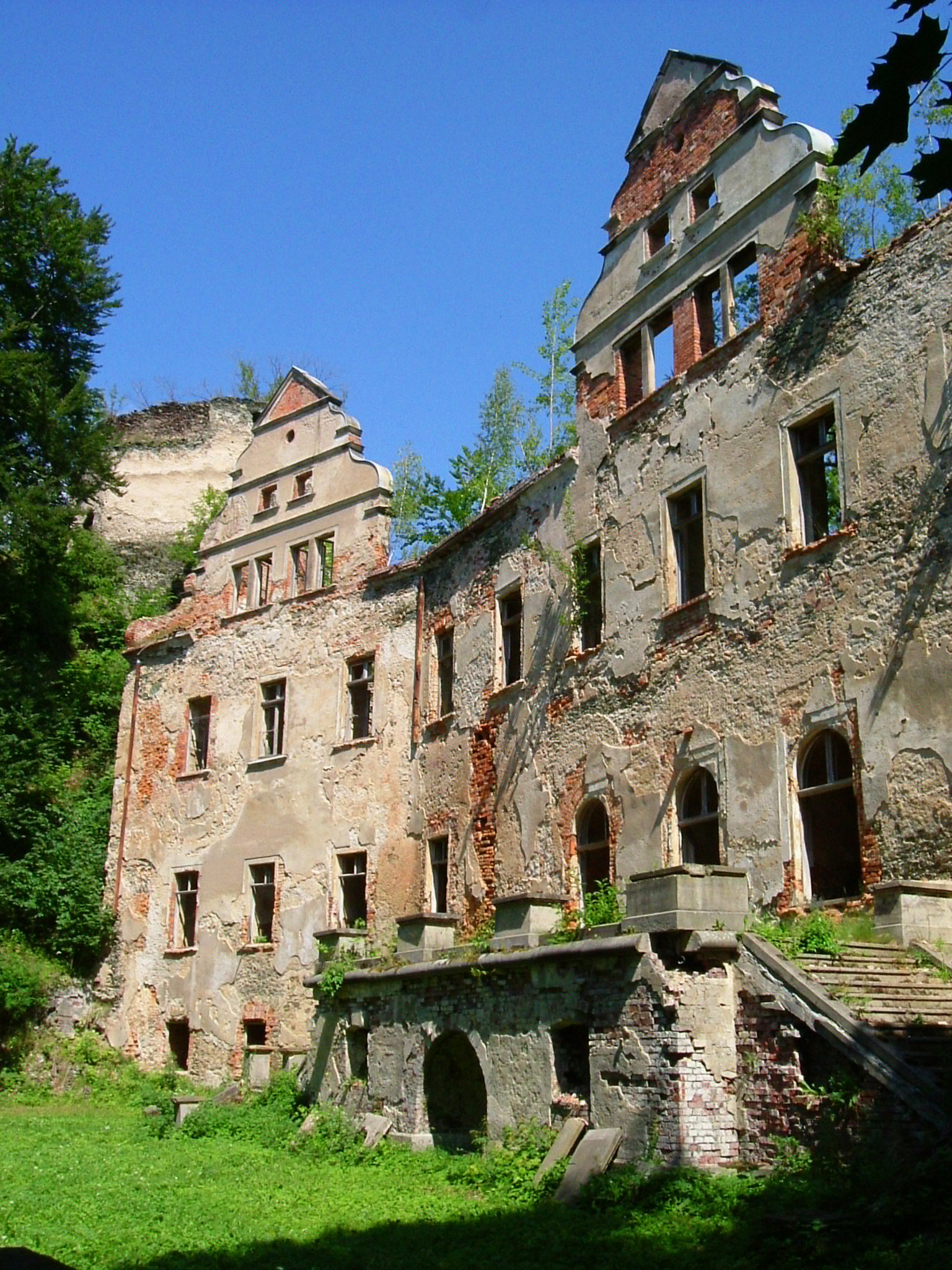
Front of Płonina Palace

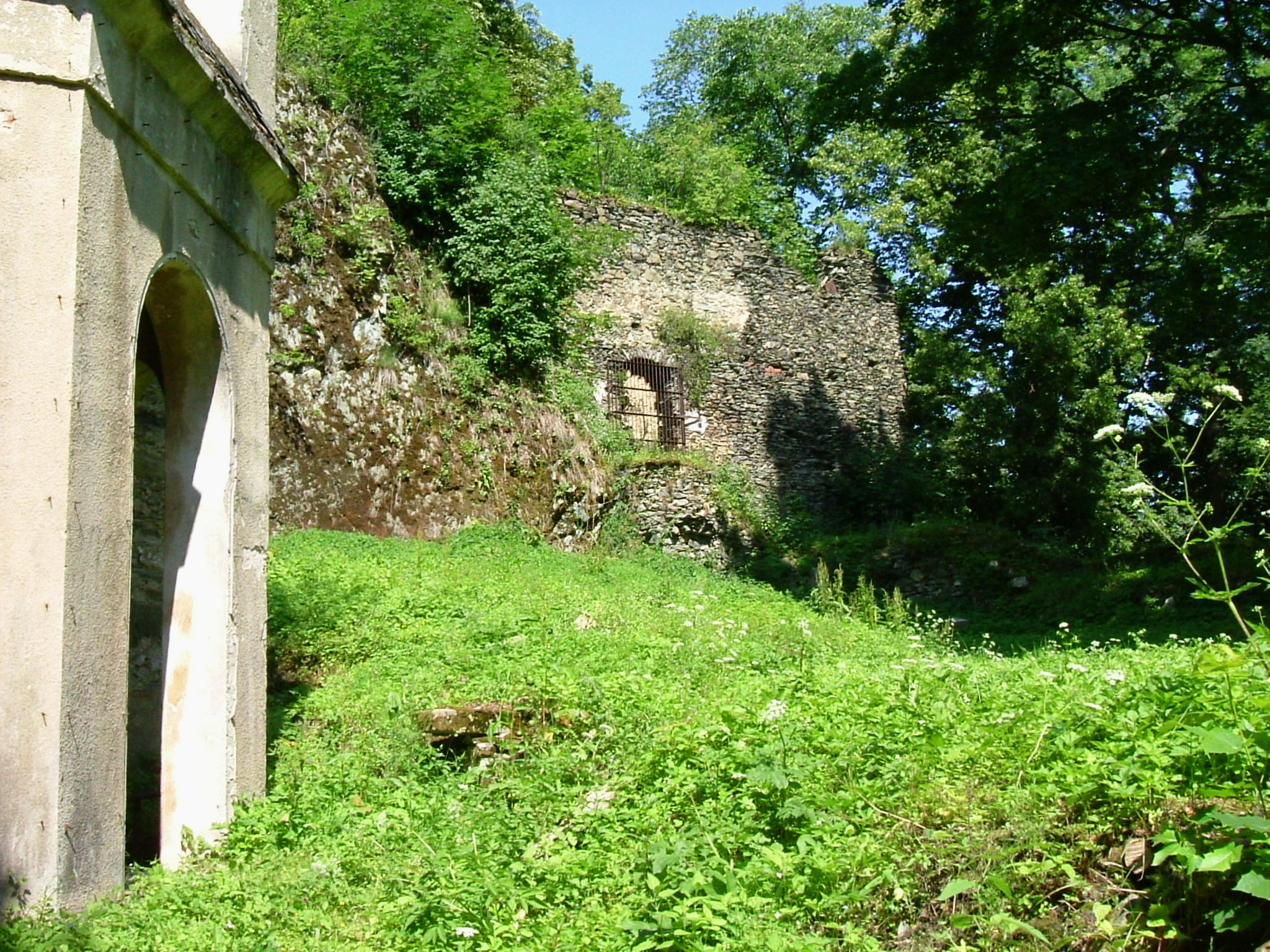
Courtyard and wall of the castle

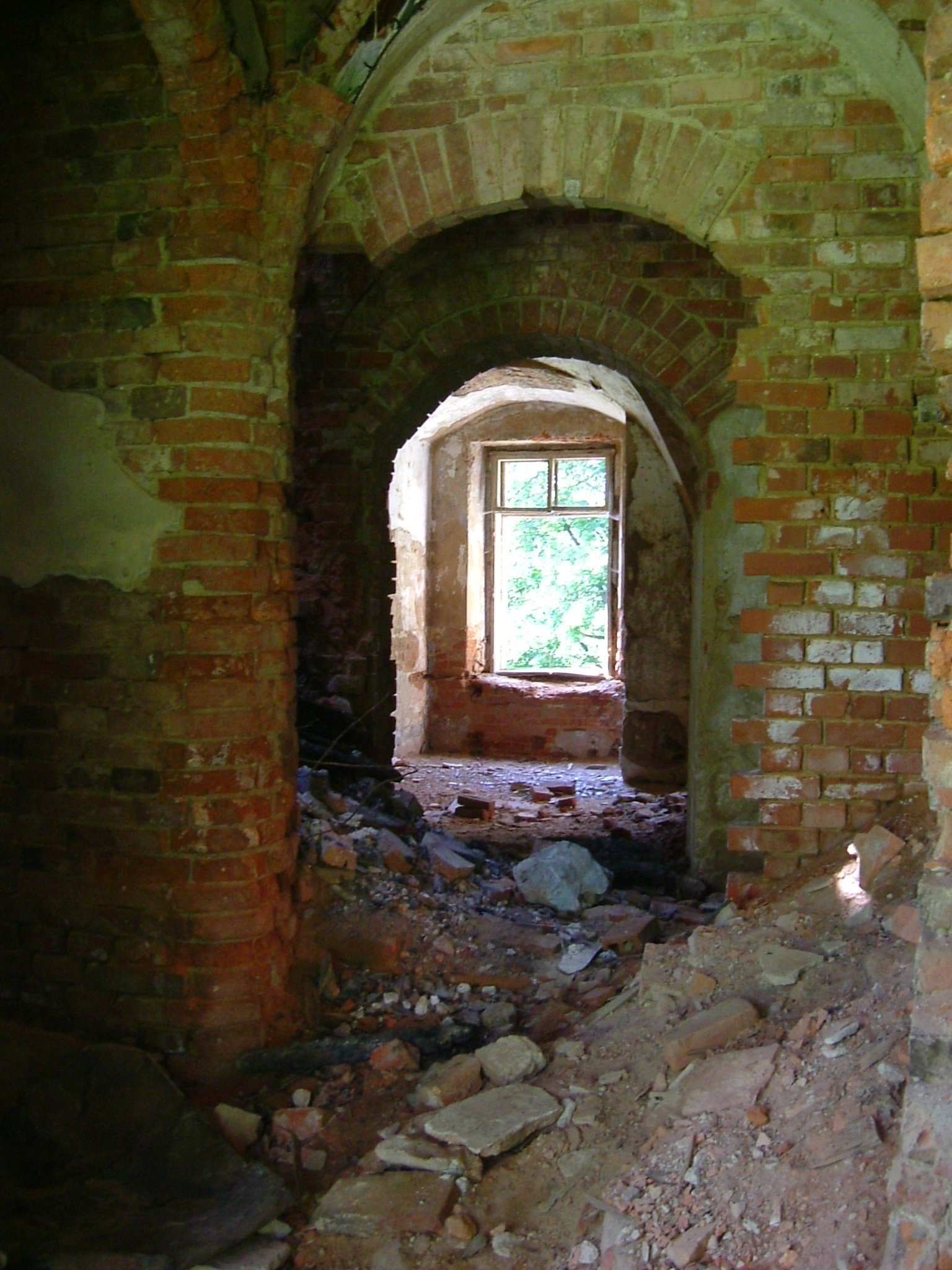
Present state of the inner chambers of the palace

Niesytno Castle (Polish: Zamek Niesytno) was a castle in the south-west of Poland, near the village of Płonina (German name: Nimmersath), situated west of Bolków. After the castle turned into ruins, Płonina Palace was built at the same site, though the place is still often referred to as Niesytno Castle. It has decayed over the years, and only its ruins have remained. It is in private hands and closed to the public, but is along the tourist Piastowskich Castle Route (Szlak Zamków Piastowskich).

== History ==
The first mention of Niesytno Castle dates back to the 13th century, but it is not known who built it. Legends tell of occupation by Hussite and mercenaries, and therefore it was also named Zakątek Strachu or Angstwinkel (Polish and German for "corner of fear"). From the second part of the 15th century until the 17th century, the castle was inhabited by the "von Zedlitz" lineage. It has been a military defense structure for several times. Later, the castle became a renaissance palace.

Nimmersath Castle was first mentioned in a letter from the Archbishop of Breslau Bishop Konrad von Oels to the Grand Master of the Teutonic Order in 1432. He informed the Grand Master that the castle was the property of Hayn of Czirn (Tschirn) and base of Hussitic rebels.

After the end of World War II, the castle ruins were owned by the automobile manufacturer "Fabryka Samochodów Ciężarowych" from Lublin. Some repairs were carried out at that time. The palace weathered until 1990.

Elżbieta Zawadzka-Malicka owned the castle from 1984 on. On 2 July 1990, it burned down due to arson, and was completely ruined. Parts of the brick walls remained after the fire.

== Present ==
The buildings are not open to the public, but it is possible to walk around the premises and get a glimpse of what is left of the buildings. The castle is located on a hill surrounded by forest, and the remainders of the tower of the castle are visible from some distance. Most of the other parts of the ruins are hidden behind trees. Some caves can be found around the ruins, which may have been basements at one time.

== See also ==
- Castles in Poland
