= Płonina, Lower Silesian Voivodeship =

Płonina
- Village
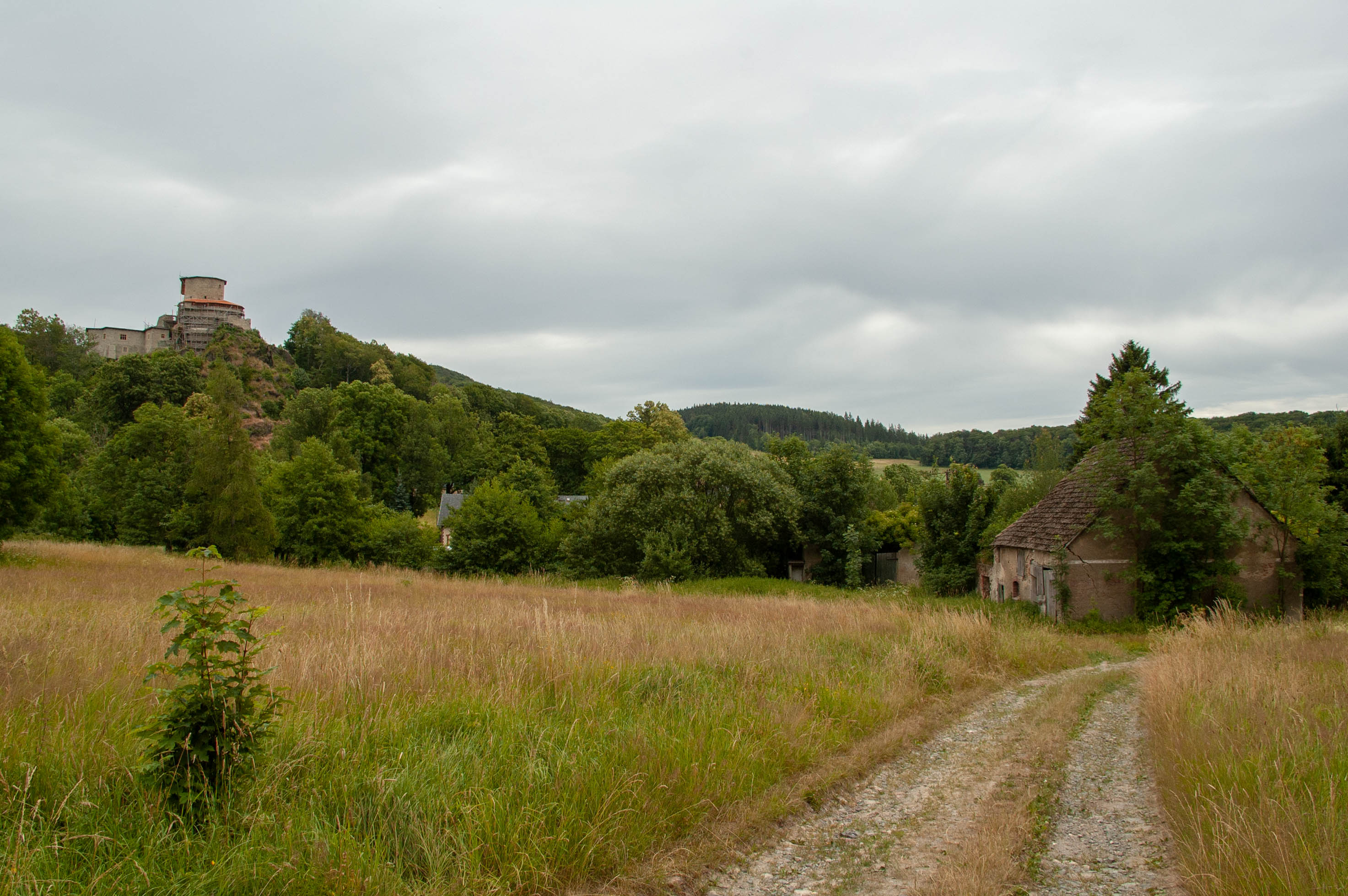
- View of the village

- Location within Poland
- Coordinates: 50°55′00″N 16°00′00″E
- Country: Poland
- Voivodeship: Lower Silesian
- County: Jawor
- Gmina: Bolków
- Highest elevation: 550 m (1,800 ft)
- Population: 157

Płonina [pwɔˈnina] is a village in the administrative district of Gmina Bolków, within Jawor County, Lower Silesian Voivodeship, in south-western Poland.

== Buildings of interest ==
Niesytno Castle lies on a small hill near Płonina.

== Gallery ==
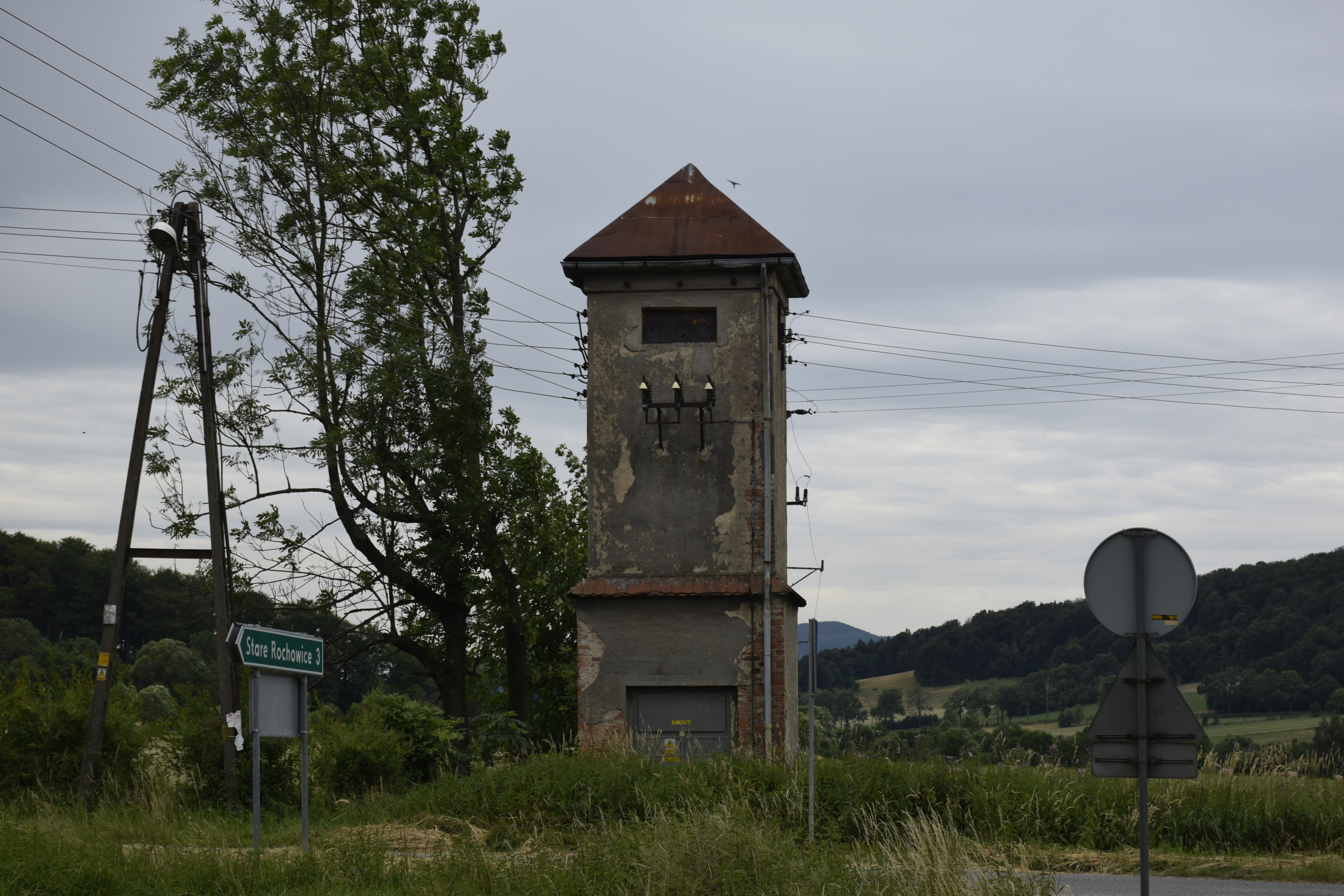
Electric station

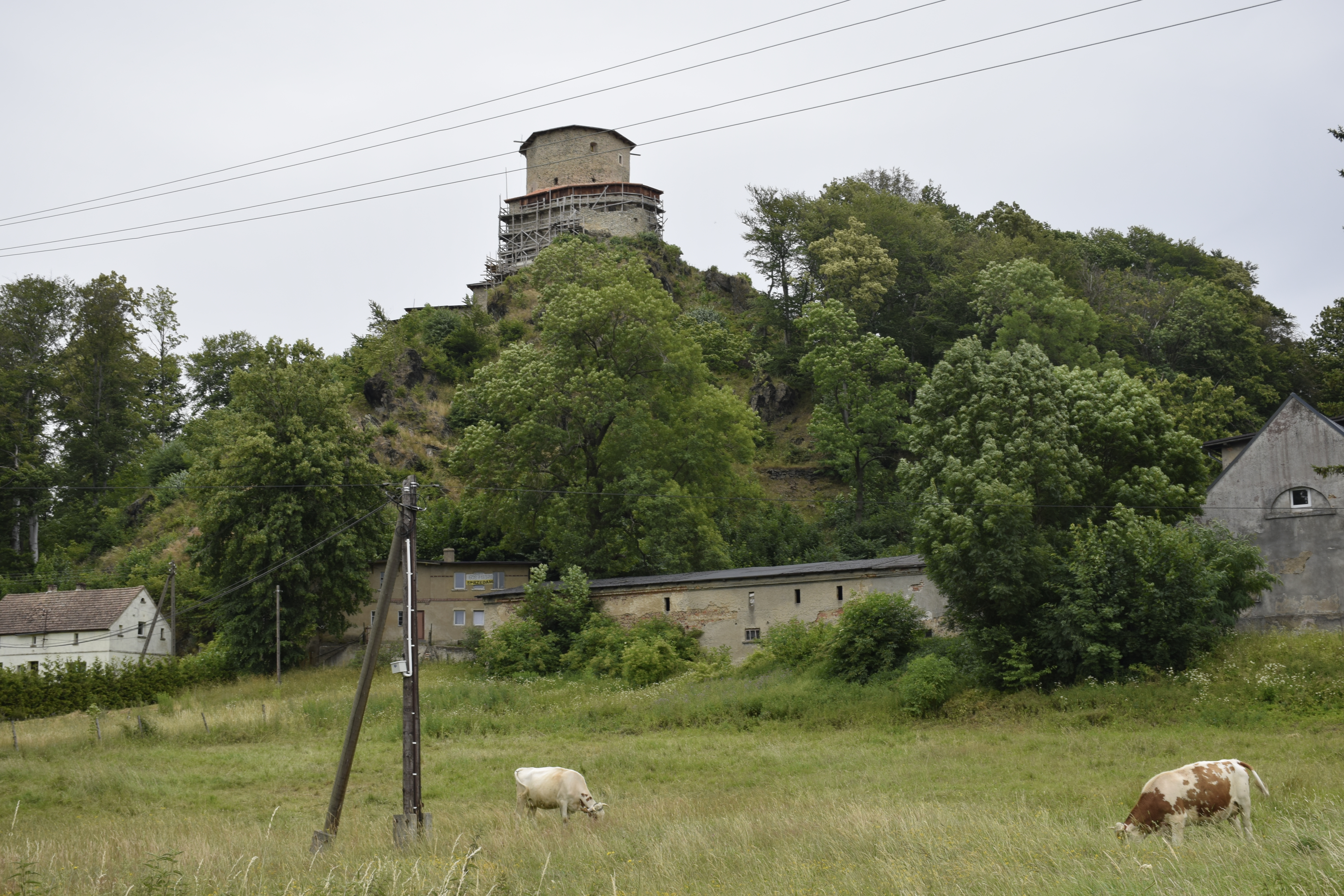
Castle and cows

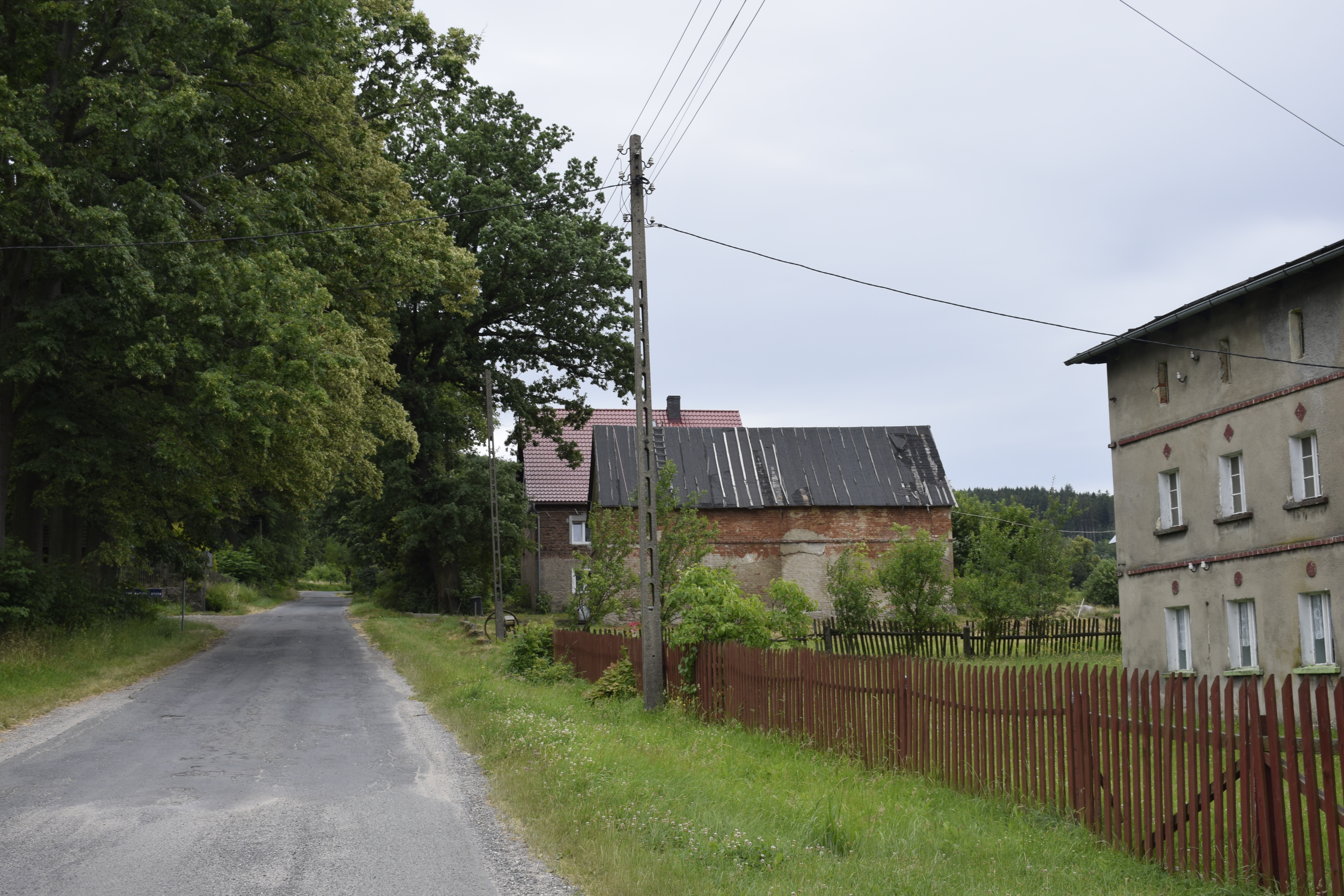
Houses by road
