= Odporyszów =

- Village
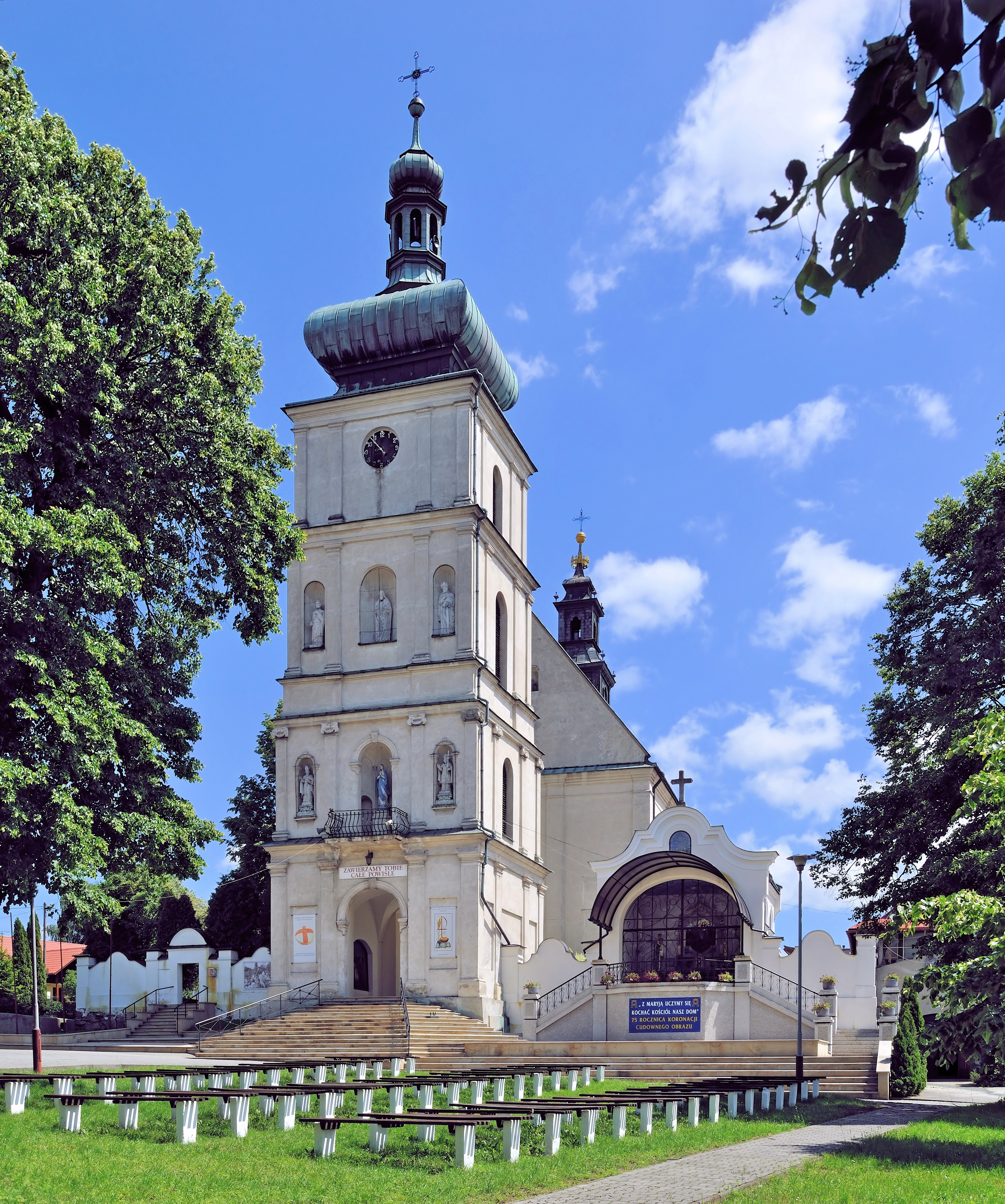

- Location within Poland
- Coordinates: 50°9′N 20°55′E
- Country: Poland
- Voivodeship: Lesser Poland
- County: Tarnów
- Gmina: Żabno

Government
  - Sołtys: Bogdan Chmura
- Population: 897
- Postal code: 33-240

Odporyszów [ɔtpɔˈrɨʂuf] is a village in the administrative district of Gmina Żabno, within Tarnów County, Lesser Poland Voivodeship, in southern Poland. The population is 897 (2021).

== Geography ==
=== Location ===
Odporyszów is situated 18 kilometers northwest of Tarnów. It borders the village of Morzychna to the east, Sieradza to the south, the town of Żabno and the village of Podlesie Dębowe to the west, and the localities of Borek and Bucze parts of the village of Wielopole to the north. Provincial road no. 975 runs through the village.

== History ==
=== 14th–19th Century ===
A document issued in Kraków on January 26, 1385, by Queen Jadwiga to Spytek of Melsztyn granting Magdeburg rights to his towns of Żabno and Brzesko, as well as to several specifically named villages—serves as the first written source in which the name of the village appears. However, it contains no mention of the existence of a church or a parish. Writing after 1470 in his Liber beneficiorum, Jan Długosz using the spellings "Opporzyschow" and "Oporzischow" notes that the village consisted of four łans (peasant land holdings) subject to a tithe paid to the Dean of Kraków; he also mentions a wooden church dedicated to St. Margaret and a village school. In ancient times, the so-called "Amber Road" ran near Odporyszów, following the courses of the Dunajec and Vistula rivers, while in the Middle Ages, trade routes leading to Hungary and Kievan Rus' passed through the area.

Throughout its history, Odporyszów was repeatedly invaded by foreign forces. In 1572, a small group of local fighters repelled an attack by Tatar and Cossack hordes. During the reign of King John II Casimir Vasa specifically during the "Swedish Deluge" of 1655 Odporyszów gained renown for the valor of its Polish armed units, composed of nobility, knights, and peasants, who achieved a spectacular victory over the invaders. This event was regarded as a manifestation of a miraculous intervention by the Mother of God, and from then on, Odporyszów became a destination for pilgrimages by the Polish knighthood and the common folk, transforming into a site of worship.

==== Jan Wnęk ====
The heyday of Odporyszów is linked to the figure of Father Stanisław Morgenstern, a deputy to the Diet of Galicia, who commissioned Jan Wnęk to create sculptures for 52 chapels. Between 1866 and 1869, Jan Wnęk, a local sculptor, carpenter, and inventor performed a series of flights from the church bell tower using a flying machine he had built himself, all in the presence of thousands of pilgrims. Due to a lack of documentary evidence, these pioneering feats have yet to be recognized in the official history of aviation; however, efforts continue to have Wnęk acknowledged as a "pioneer of global aviation" and the "first aviator." His final, ill-fated flight which ended in a crash and the subsequent death of this "Icarus of the Dunajec" took place on the eve of Pentecost in 1869.

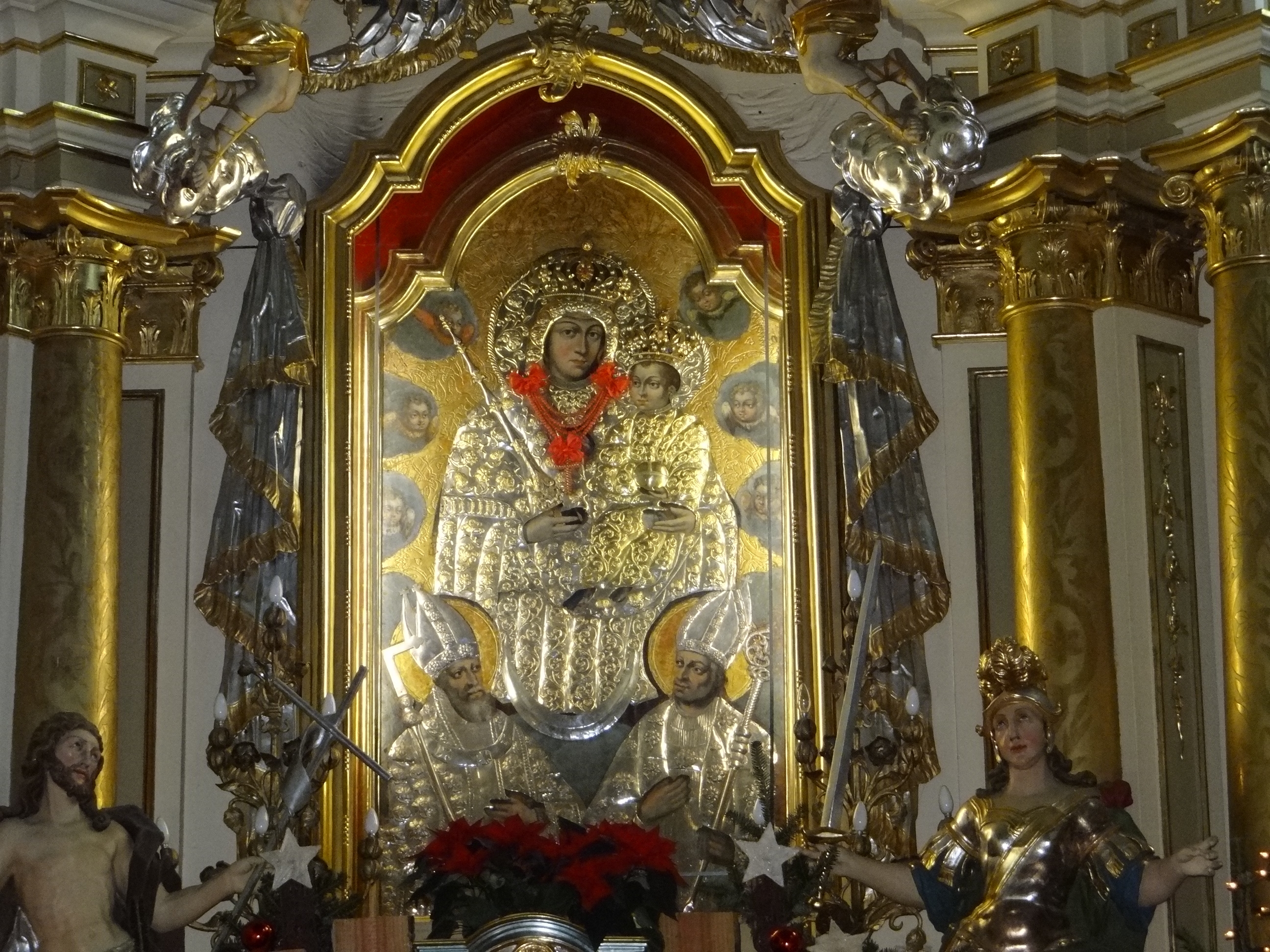
The miraculous image of the Mother of God in the Odporyszów sanctuary

===== Sanctuary of Our Lady Victorious =====
The first mention of the parish in Odporyszów appears in Jan Długosz’s Liber beneficiorum (dating from after 1470) and refers to a church dedicated to St. Margaret, which stood until the beginning of the 18th century. According to Długosz, the church owned farmland and a fishpond, and the parish priest collected tithes from the village of Czarne Niwy. During the Swedish invasion, when the forces of Charles Gustav burned the nearby town of Żabno, a small group of nobles, knights, and commoners entrenched in a forest near the church launched an attack on the Swedish troops, scattering them and driving them into the nearby marshes. As a legend still recounted today tells it, the Virgin Mary came to the aid of the defenders of Odporyszów, causing a spring of pure water to emerge from seven small sources that burst forth from the parched earth. To this day, a crystal-clear spring continues to flow within what is known as the "little well" studzienka. Following this victory over the non-Catholic invaders, an image of the Virgin Mary became the object of a growing cult, attracting ever-larger numbers of pilgrims. Those who came before the "Lady of the Powiśle Region" left behind numerous votive offerings and accounts recorded in chronicles. It was then that plans were made to construct a new, single-nave Baroque-style church; the building was completed in 1702 after 30 years of work and the miraculous image was placed in its main altar. The new sanctuary was consecrated on September 16, 1714, by Bishop Michał Szembek abbot in commendam of the Mogiła Abbey and suffragan bishop of Kraków. The church was dedicated to the Most Holy Virgin Mary; in later centuries, this dedication was expanded to include specific mysteries from the life of the Mother of God currently, it is dedicated to the Purification of the Blessed Virgin Mary, a feast popularly known as that of "Our Lady of the Candlemas" (literally: "Our Lady of the Candle"). During the partitions of Poland, all the vota (votive offerings) were seized by order of the Austrian Archduke Joseph II. A period of religious indifference followed, accompanied by a decline in the number of pilgrims.

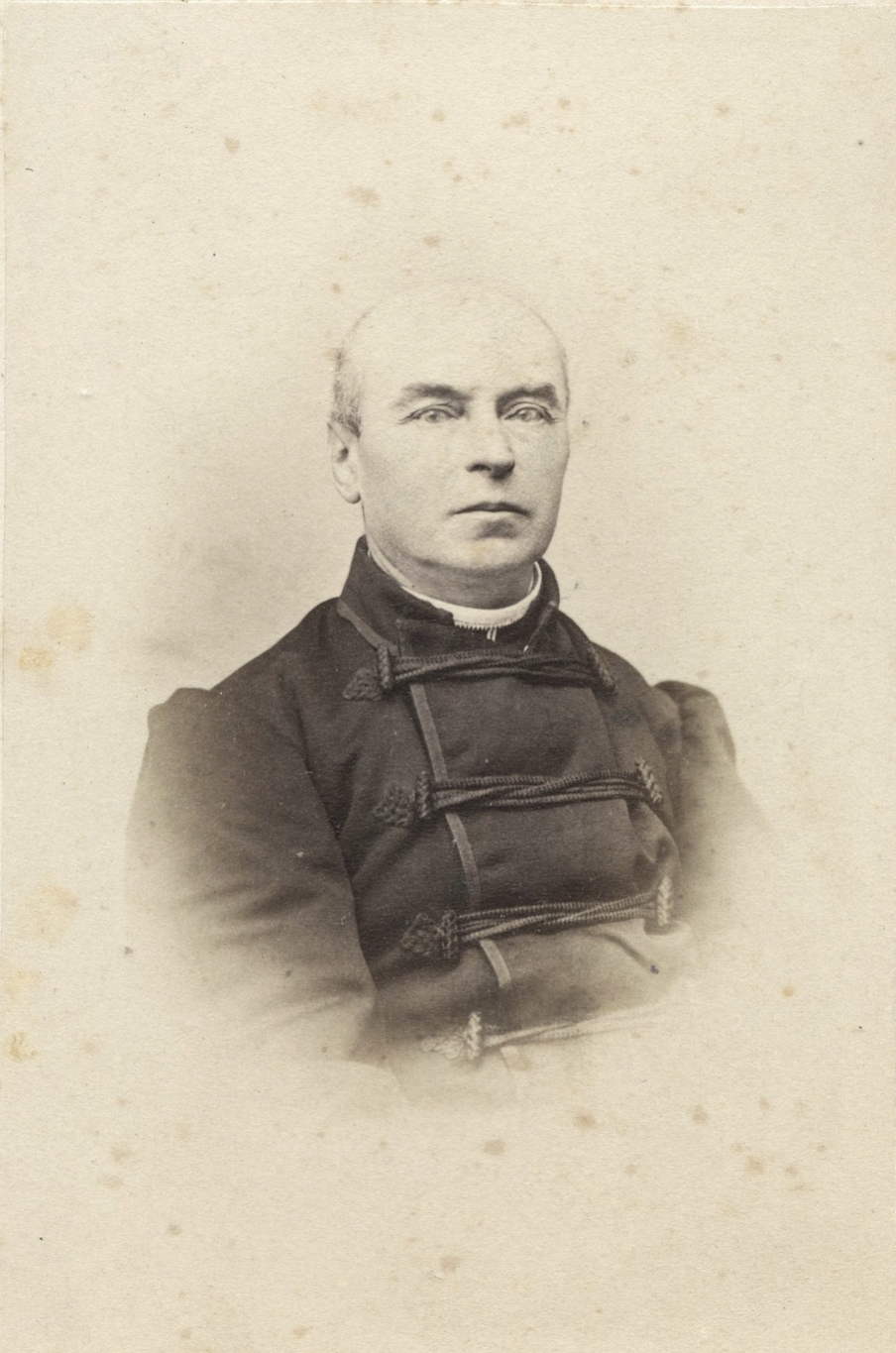
Stanisław Morgenstern – parish priest and restorer of the sanctuary in Odporyszów (1849–1880)

On March 31, 1849, Father Stanisław Morgenstern became the parish priest of the combined parishes of Żabno and Odporyszów. He set about restoring the sanctuary to its former glory and oversaw the construction of 52 small chapels throughout the parish, modeled after those found in Palestine. A local folk artist, Jan Wnęk, created approximately 500 sculptures for these chapels.

In 1905, the Congregation of the Mission (Missionary Priests) assumed care of the sanctuary. In 1915, the church sustained damage due to military operations. Following the end of World War I, the roof, which was destroyed by an artillery blast, together with the bell tower were repaired. In 1928, a new sacristy was built, and the original one was converted into a side chapel. On August 15, 1937, the miraculous painting was solemnly crowned by the Bishop of Tarnów, Franciszek Lisowski.

Today, the local church houses a main altar featuring a painting of the Mother of God with the Child, flanked by Saint Adalbert and Saint Stanislaus. Other notable features include side altars with paintings of Saint Catherine, the Suffering Christ, and Saint Joseph; a marble baptismal font; a Rococo-style pulpit; an 11-stop organ; the Stations of the Passion; stained-glass windows crafted by the Żeleński firm in Kraków; and a Baroque crucifix. Directly opposite the main entrance to the church stands a detached bell tower, topped with a cupola and a lantern. The bell hanging within it was cast in 1925 in the town of Udine, in northern Italy. Between 1866 and 1869, Jan Wnęk carried out his flights from a platform attached to the bell tower.

====== XX Century ======
German Occupation

In the 1939/1940 school year, a curriculum imposed by the Germans came into effect. During the winter, classes were frequently interrupted due to a lack of fuel. In January 1940, the occupying authorities prohibited primary schools from teaching history, political geography, and singing; the use of Polish language textbooks was also forbidden. Only textbooks for religion, arithmetic, and natural science were permitted. School principals were required to hand over the confiscated textbooks to the municipal authorities. It was also ordered that national emblems, portraits, maps, and paintings be removed, and students were issued report cards in the German language. Older youths especially boys hid in the forests for fear of being arrested and deported for forced labor or sent to a concentration camp. In 1945, as fighting intensified near the Dunajec River, the Germans compelled the villagers to perform forced labor, digging trenches; residents were transported to the sites by horse-drawn cart. For this slave-like labor, they received meager pay, food rations, and alcohol. The Germans demanded quotas of grain and livestock from farmers and confiscated horses for military use; consequently, peasants would secretly grind grain, bake bread, and slaughter their own livestock all at the risk of severe punishment. In the forest, along the road from Żabno to Dąbrowa Tarnowska, there were depots for weapons and ammunition. The area was heavily guarded by sentries in German uniforms men who hailed from Ukraine, Mongolia, and Croatia and who would occasionally visit the village when off duty, looking for food. One day, they came under fire from partisans; they immediately reported the incident to their command in Dąbrowa Tarnowska. That same day, trucks filled with armed soldiers arrived in the village, led by a unit commander who ordered the arrest of the ten wealthiest farmers. Following an intervention by the family of Marcin Augustyński one of those detained all the men were released the next day. After the German surrender was announced, demobilized Soviet soldiers passed through Odporyszów. Laden with war booty, they drove herds of cattle eastward on horseback while plundering local farms and orchards.

== Modern day Odporyszów ==
The village is home to the Jan Wnęk Primary School and the seat of the Parish of the Purification of the Blessed Virgin Mary. Nearby lies the Jan Wnęk Parish Museum a site recommended as part of the Lesser Poland Wooden Architecture Route which exhibits sculptures by the "Icarus of Odporyszów" (Jan Wnęk).

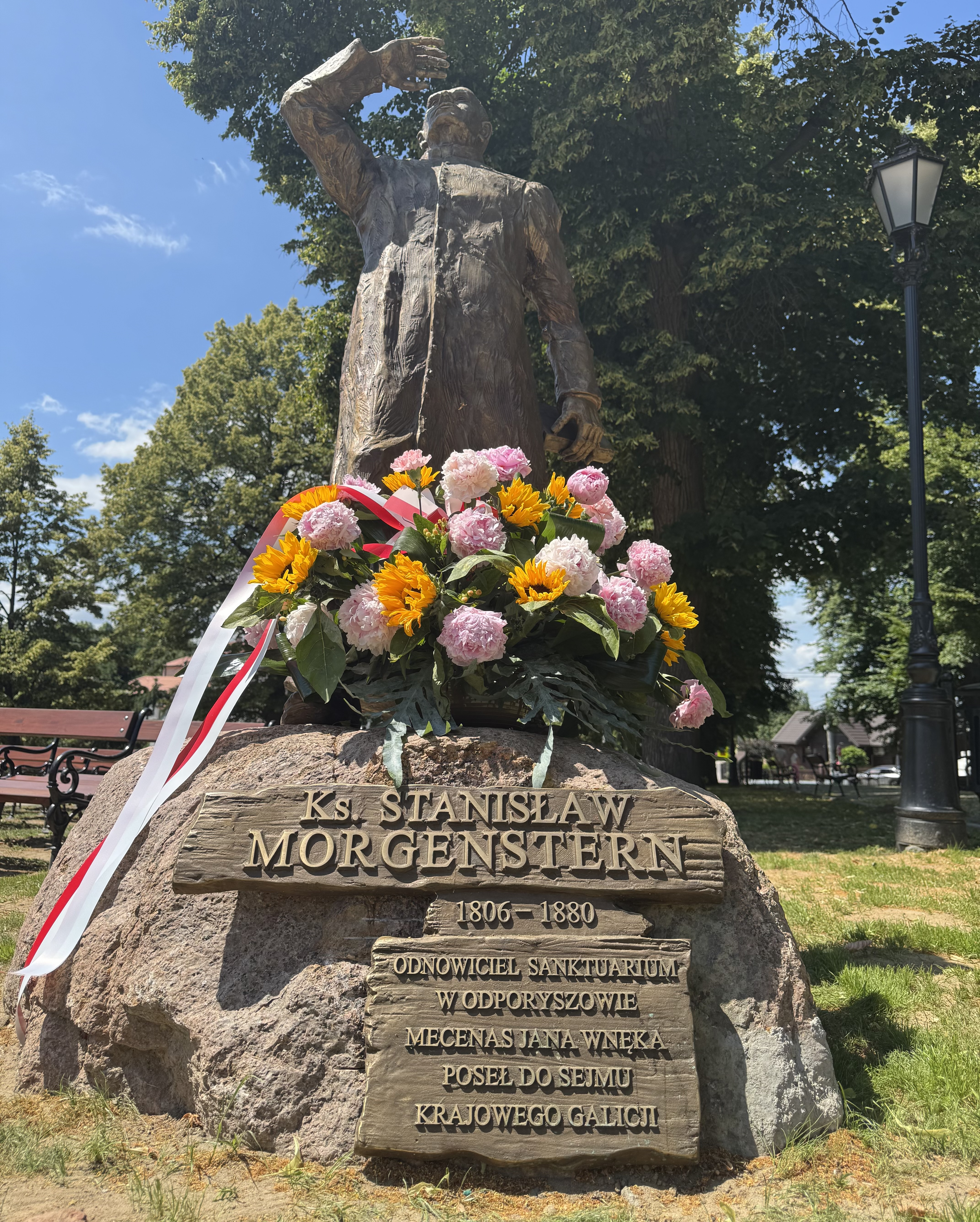
Monument of Stanisław Morgenstern at the pilgrimage square in Odporyszów (2025)

Since mid-2002, the Demos Foundation has been developing an educational and sports complex for children on the site of the former farm of Wojciech Augustyński. Spanning approximately 10 hectares, the site saw the opening of a children's home, a day-support center, a holiday retreat, and a sports center by the Siemacha Association in September 2014. The complex also includes an equestrian sports center. Additionally, the Jan Wnęk Airstrip is located here.
