= Nowe Żukowice =

- Village
- Location within Poland
- Coordinates: 50°05′17″N 21°08′14″E
- Country: Poland
- Voivodeship: Lesser Poland
- County: Tarnów
- Gmina: Lisia Góra
- Population: 910

Nowe Żukowice [ˈnɔvɛ ʐukɔˈvit͡sɛ] is a village in the administrative district of Gmina Lisia Góra, within Tarnów County, Lesser Poland Voivodeship, in southern Poland.
