= Nowa Jastrząbka =

- Village
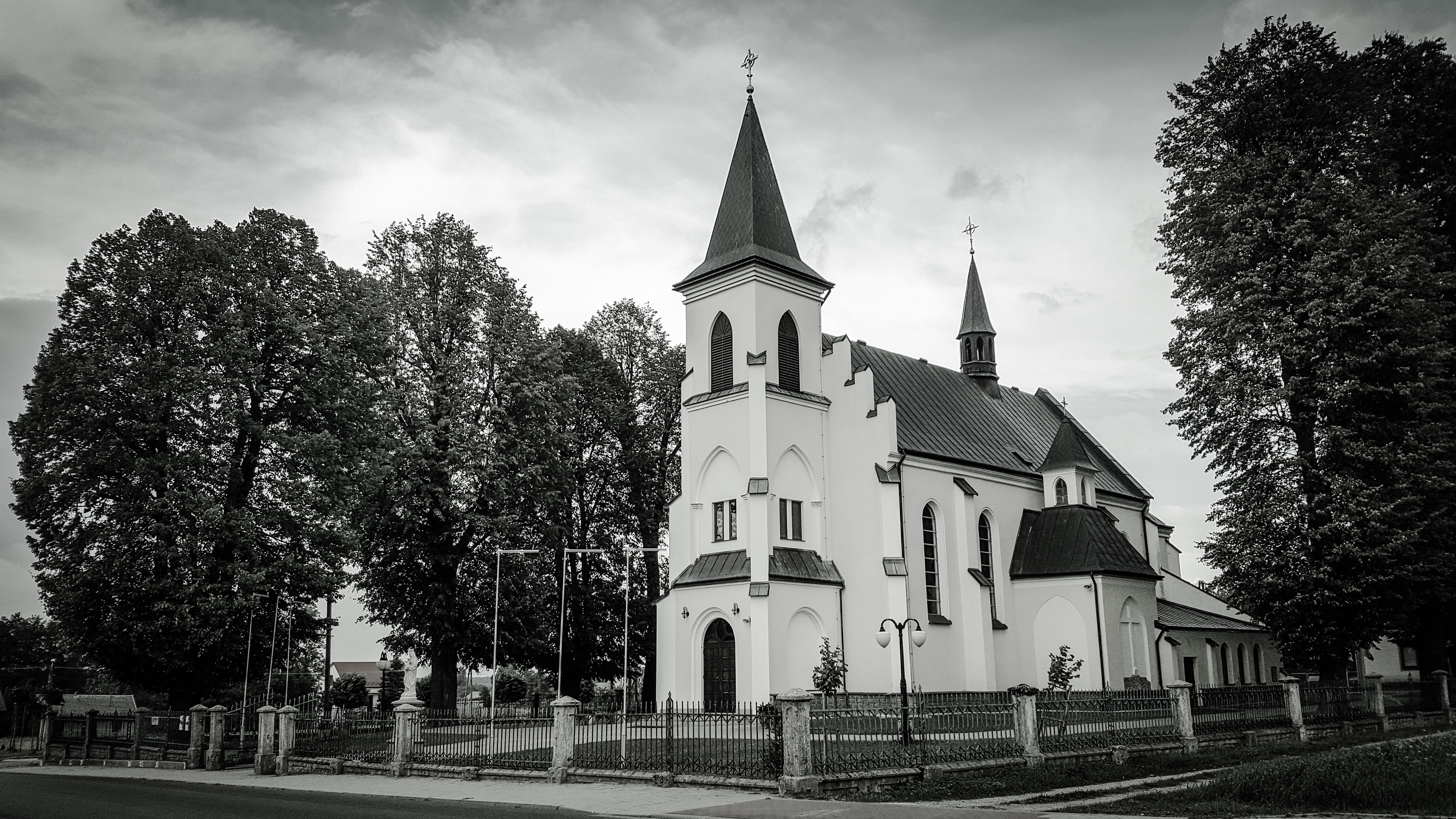
- Catholic church

- Location within Poland
- Coordinates: 50°7′N 21°8′E
- Country: Poland
- Voivodeship: Lesser Poland
- County: Tarnów
- Gmina: Lisia Góra
- Elevation: 255 m (837 ft)
- Population: 1,114

Nowa Jastrząbka [ˈnɔva jasˈtʂɔmpka] is a village in the administrative district of Gmina Lisia Góra, within Tarnów County, Lesser Poland Voivodeship, in southern Poland.
