= Brzozówka, Tarnów County =

Brzozówka
- Village
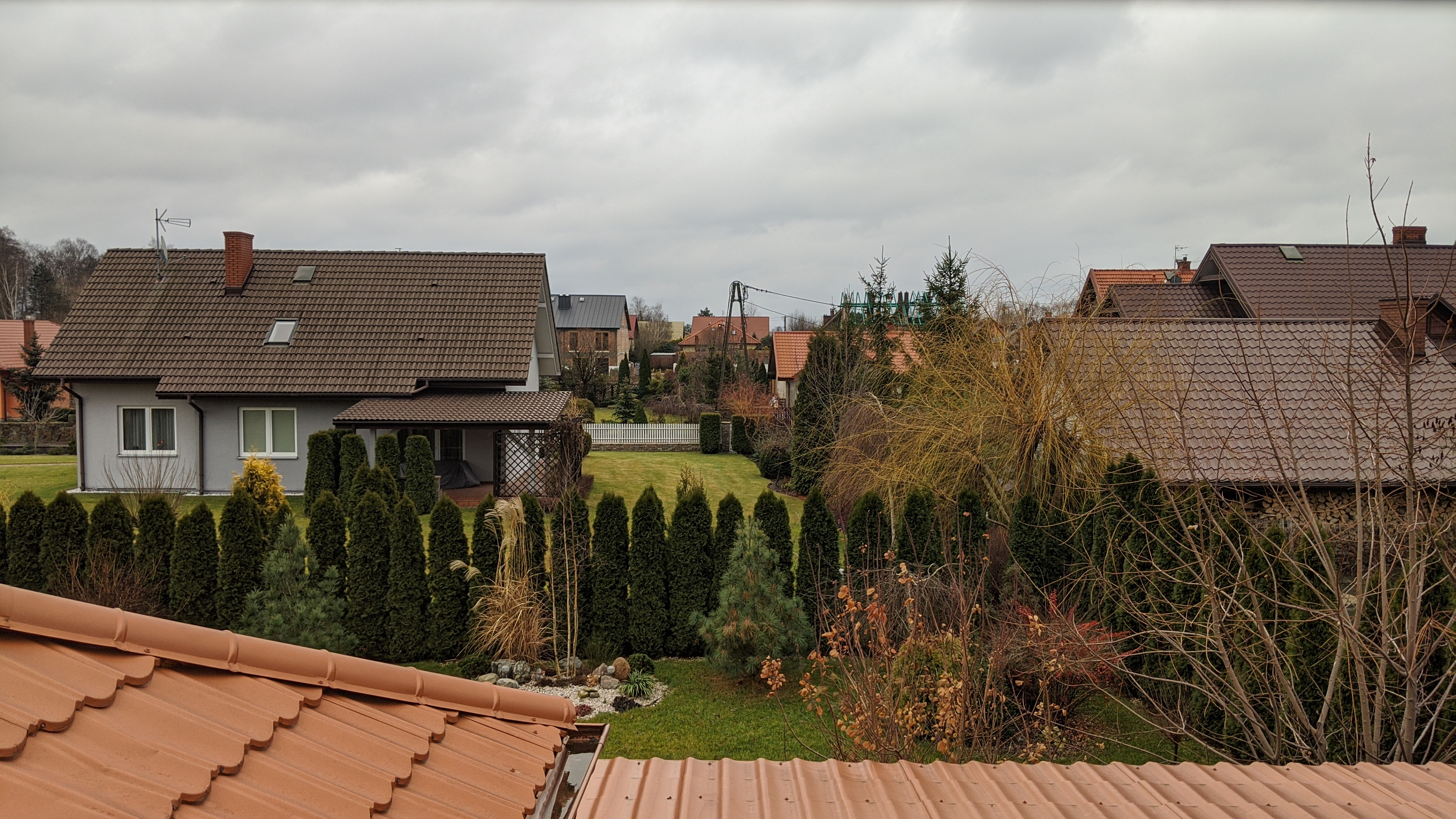

- Location within Poland
- Coordinates: 50°3′34″N 21°0′56″E
- Country: Poland
- Voivodeship: Lesser Poland
- County: Tarnów
- Gmina: Lisia Góra
- Population: 1,064

Brzozówka [bʐɔˈzufka] is a village in the administrative district of Gmina Lisia Góra, within Tarnów County, Lesser Poland Voivodeship, in southern Poland.
