= Siedliszowice, Lesser Poland Voivodeship =

Siedliszowice
- Village
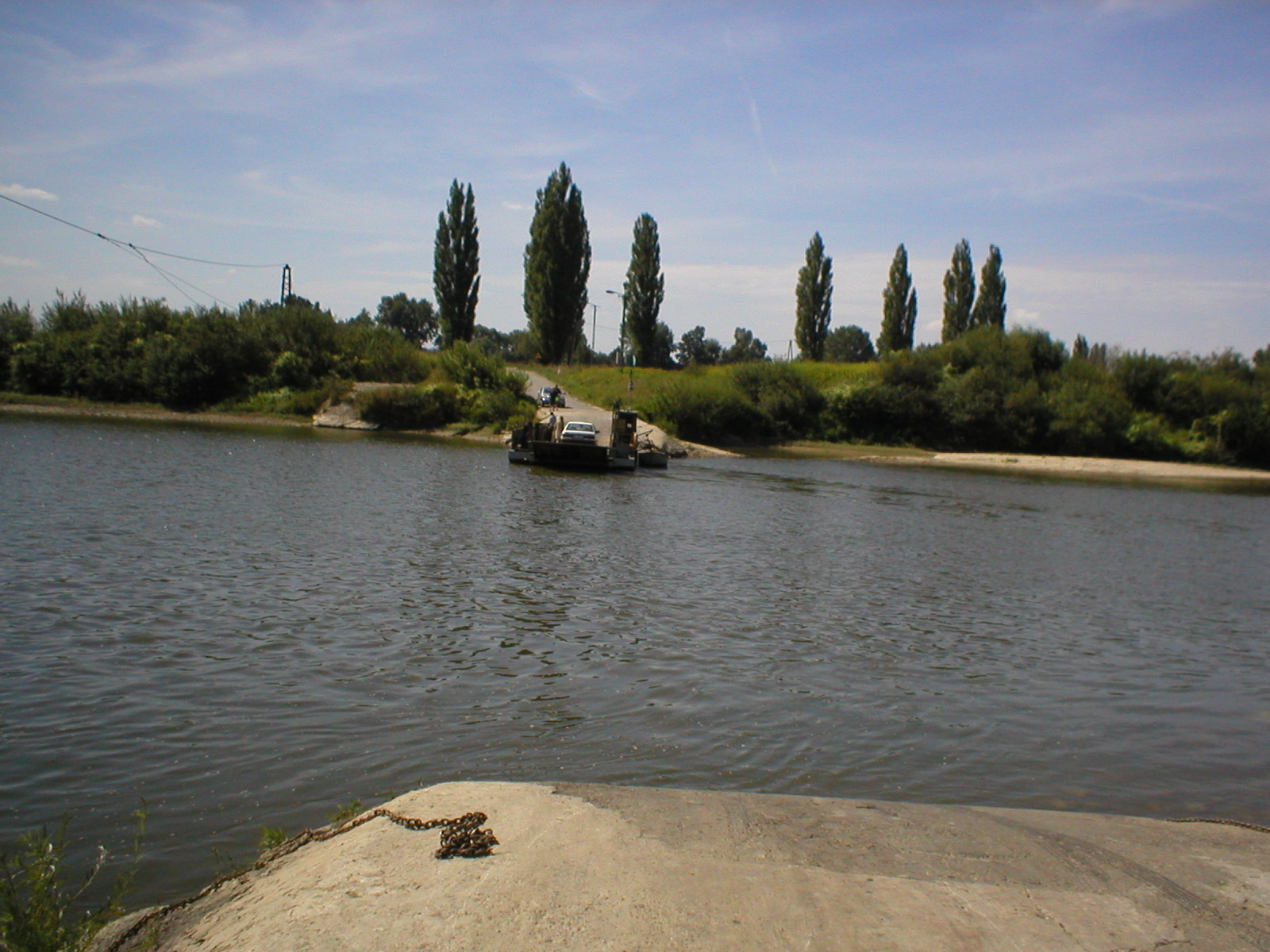

- Location within Poland
- Coordinates: 50°12′14″N 20°46′15″E
- Country: Poland
- Voivodeship: Lesser Poland
- County: Tarnów
- Gmina: Żabno

Siedliszowice [ɕɛdliʂɔˈvit͡sɛ] is a village in the administrative district of Gmina Żabno, within Tarnów County, Lesser Poland Voivodeship, in southern Poland.
