= Otfinów =

- Village
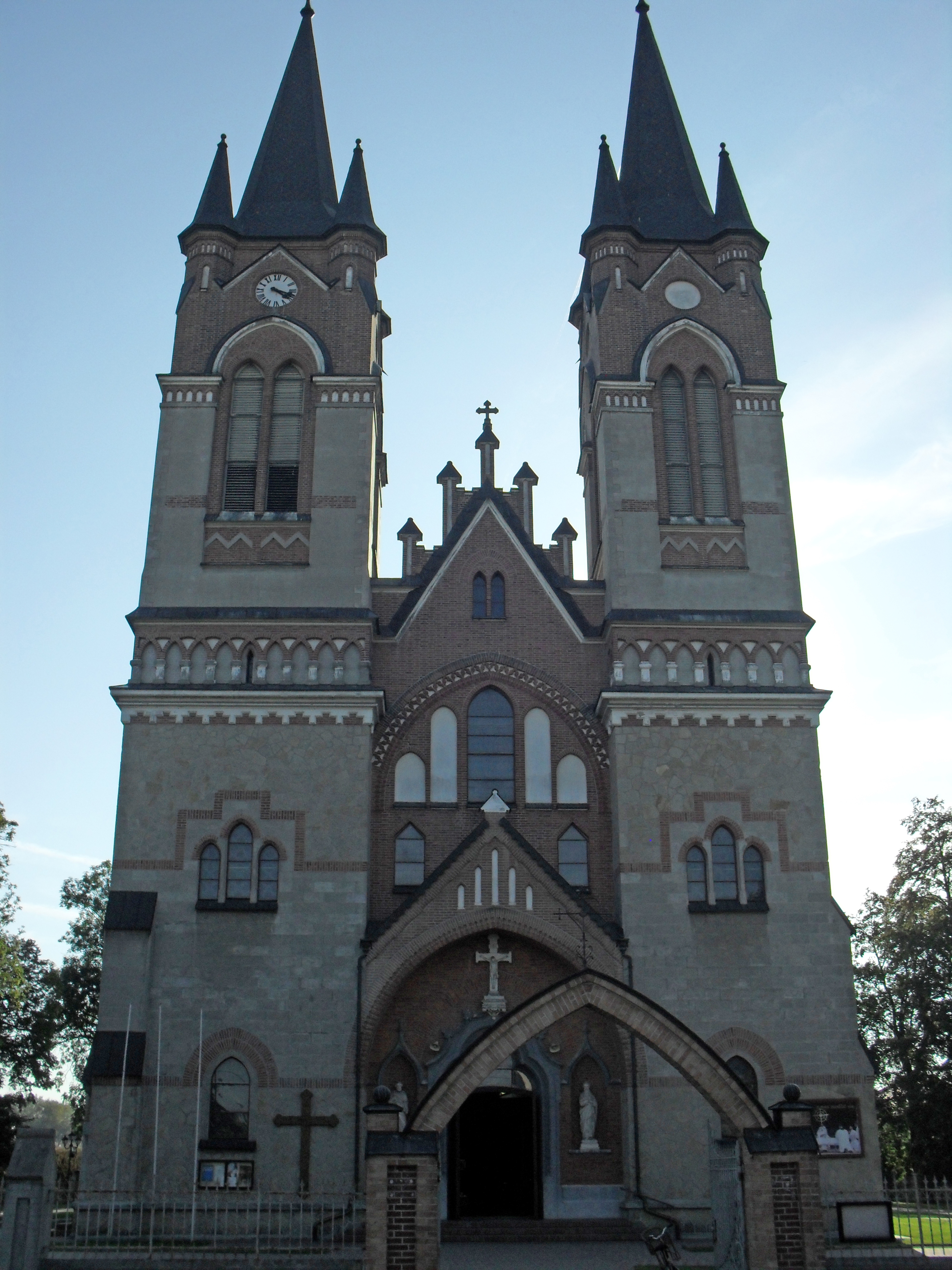
- Saints Peter and Paul Church

- Location within Poland
- Coordinates: 50°11′N 20°49′E
- Country: Poland
- Voivodeship: Lesser Poland
- County: Tarnów
- Gmina: Żabno

Otfinów [ɔtˈfinuf] is a village in the administrative district of Gmina Żabno, within Tarnów County, Lesser Poland Voivodeship, in southern Poland.
