= Śmigno =

- Village
- Location within Poland
- Coordinates: 50°5′N 21°0′E
- Country: Poland
- Voivodeship: Lesser Poland
- County: Tarnów
- Gmina: Lisia Góra

Śmigno [ˈɕmiɡnɔ] is a village in the administrative district of Gmina Lisia Góra, within Tarnów County, Lesser Poland Voivodeship, in southern Poland.
