= Kłyż =

- Village
- Location within Poland
- Coordinates: 50°12′32″N 20°50′32″E
- Country: Poland
- Voivodeship: Lesser Poland
- County: Tarnów
- Gmina: Żabno
- Elevation: 8 m (26 ft)
- Population (approx.): 400

Kłyż [kwɨʂ] is a village in the administrative district of Gmina Żabno, within Tarnów County, Lesser Poland Voivodeship, in southern Poland.

The village has an approximate population of 400.
