= Kaluga (disambiguation) =

Kaluga is a city in Central Russia.

Kaluga may also refer to:

- Kaluga Oblast (created 5 July 1944 as part of the Soviet Union), now a federal subject of Russia
- Kaluga Province (1719–1775), Russian Empire
- Kaluga Governorate (1796–1929), Russian Empire
- Kaluga, Poland, a village in southern Poland
- Kaługa, Kuyavian-Pomeranian Voivodeship, a village in north-central Poland
- Kaluga, Oryol Oblast, a village in Oryol Oblast, Russia
- Kaluga-Solovyovka, a village (selo) in Chelyabinsk Oblast, Russia
- Kaluga (fish), a sturgeon found in the Amur River basin
- Kaluga Queen, the largest caviar producer in the world
- FC Kaluga, football club from Kaluga
- FC Lokomotiv Kaluga
- FC Turbostroitel Kaluga
- Kaluga crater
- Kaluga Airport

== See also ==
- Kaluzhsky (disambiguation)
