= Pogórska Wola =

- Village
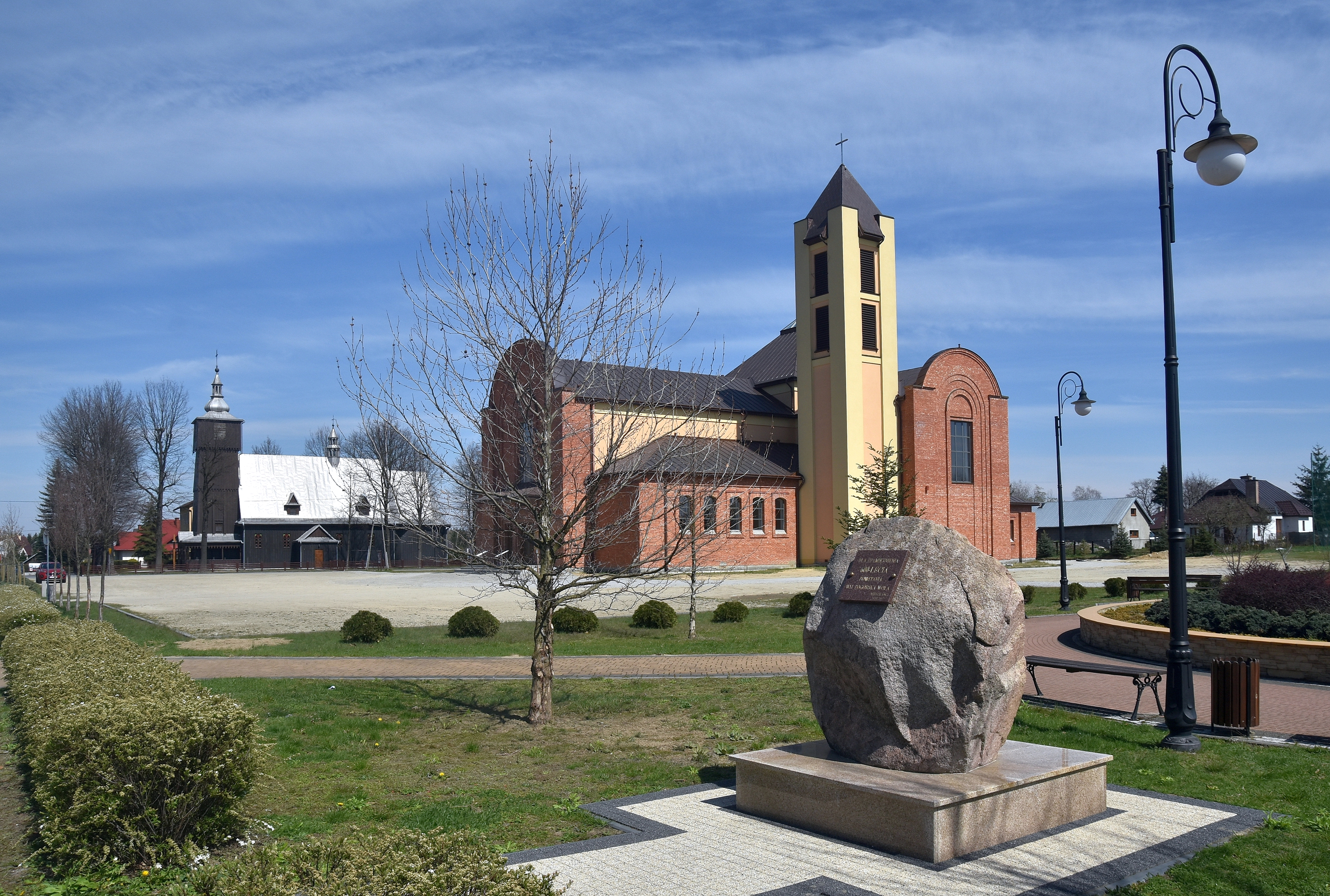
- Church of Saint Joseph

- Location within Poland
- Coordinates: 50°01′01″N 21°09′29″E
- Country: Poland
- Voivodeship: Lesser Poland
- County: Tarnów
- Gmina: Skrzyszów

Population
  - Total: 3,187 (2,021)

Pogórska Wola [pɔˈɡurska ˈvɔla] is a village in the administrative district of Gmina Skrzyszów, within Tarnów County, Lesser Poland Voivodeship, in southern Poland.
