= Miechowice Małe =

- Village
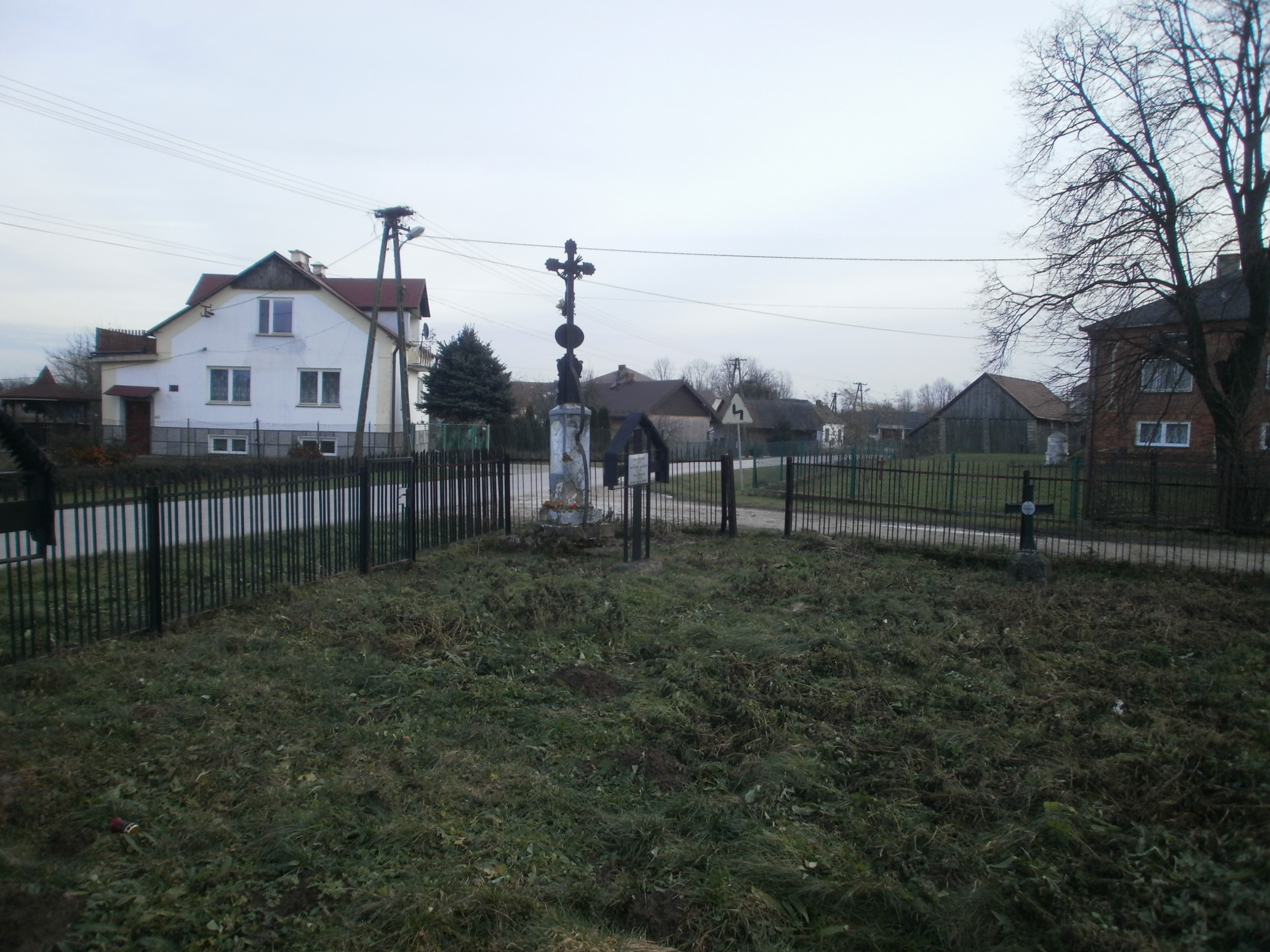

- Location within Poland
- Coordinates: 50°10′N 20°46′E
- Country: Poland
- Voivodeship: Lesser Poland
- County: Tarnów
- Gmina: Wietrzychowice

Miechowice Małe [mjɛxɔˈvit͡sɛ ˈmawɛ] is a village in the administrative district of Gmina Wietrzychowice, within Tarnów County, Lesser Poland Voivodeship, in southern Poland.
