= Łęg Tarnowski =

- Village
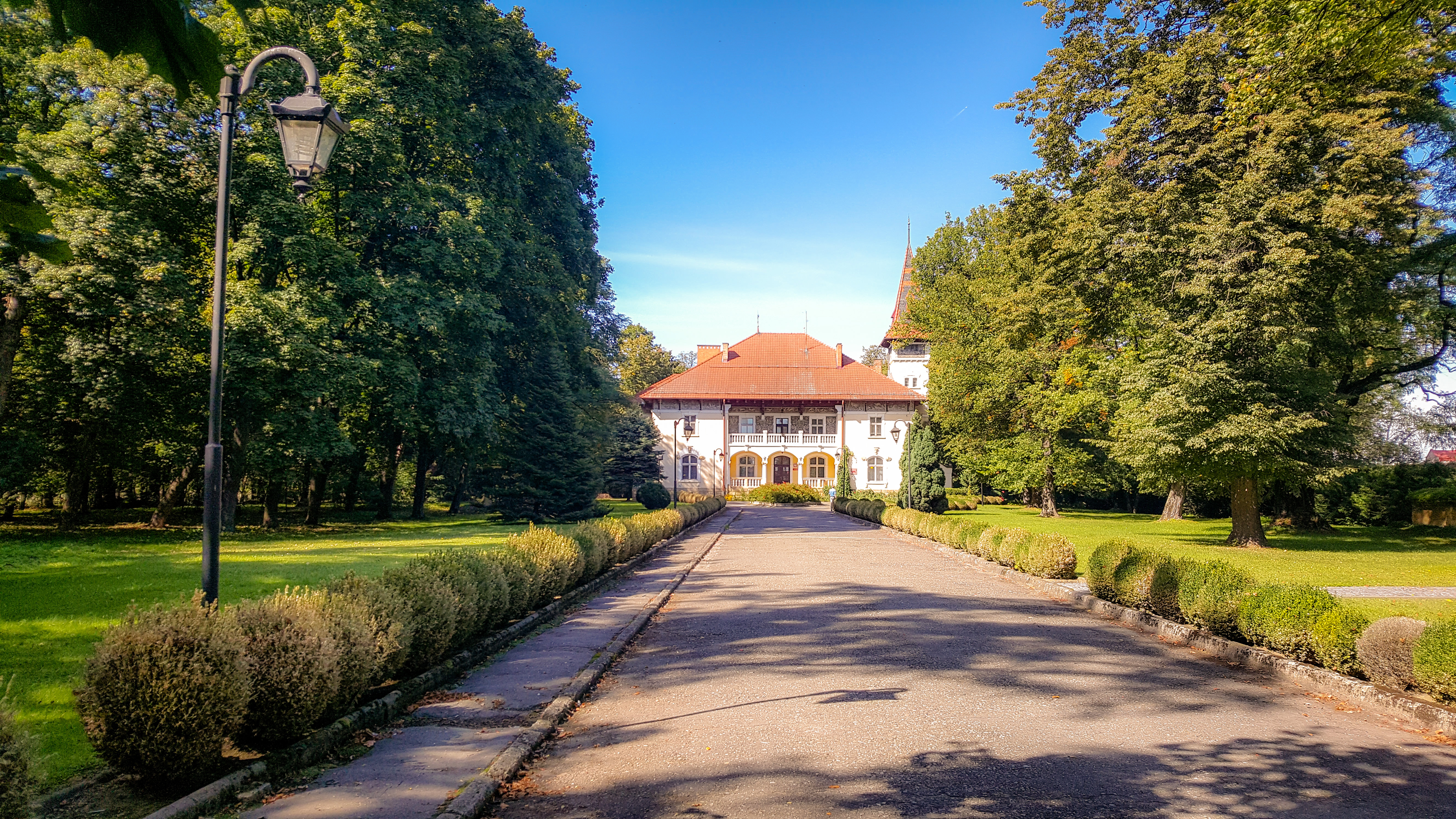
- Palace

- Location within Poland
- Coordinates: 50°5′48″N 20°55′35″E
- Country: Poland
- Voivodeship: Lesser Poland
- County: Tarnów
- Gmina: Żabno

Łęg Tarnowski [ˈwɛnk tarˈnɔfski] is a village in the administrative district of Gmina Żabno, within Tarnów County, Lesser Poland Voivodeship, in southern Poland.
