= Niedomice =

- Village
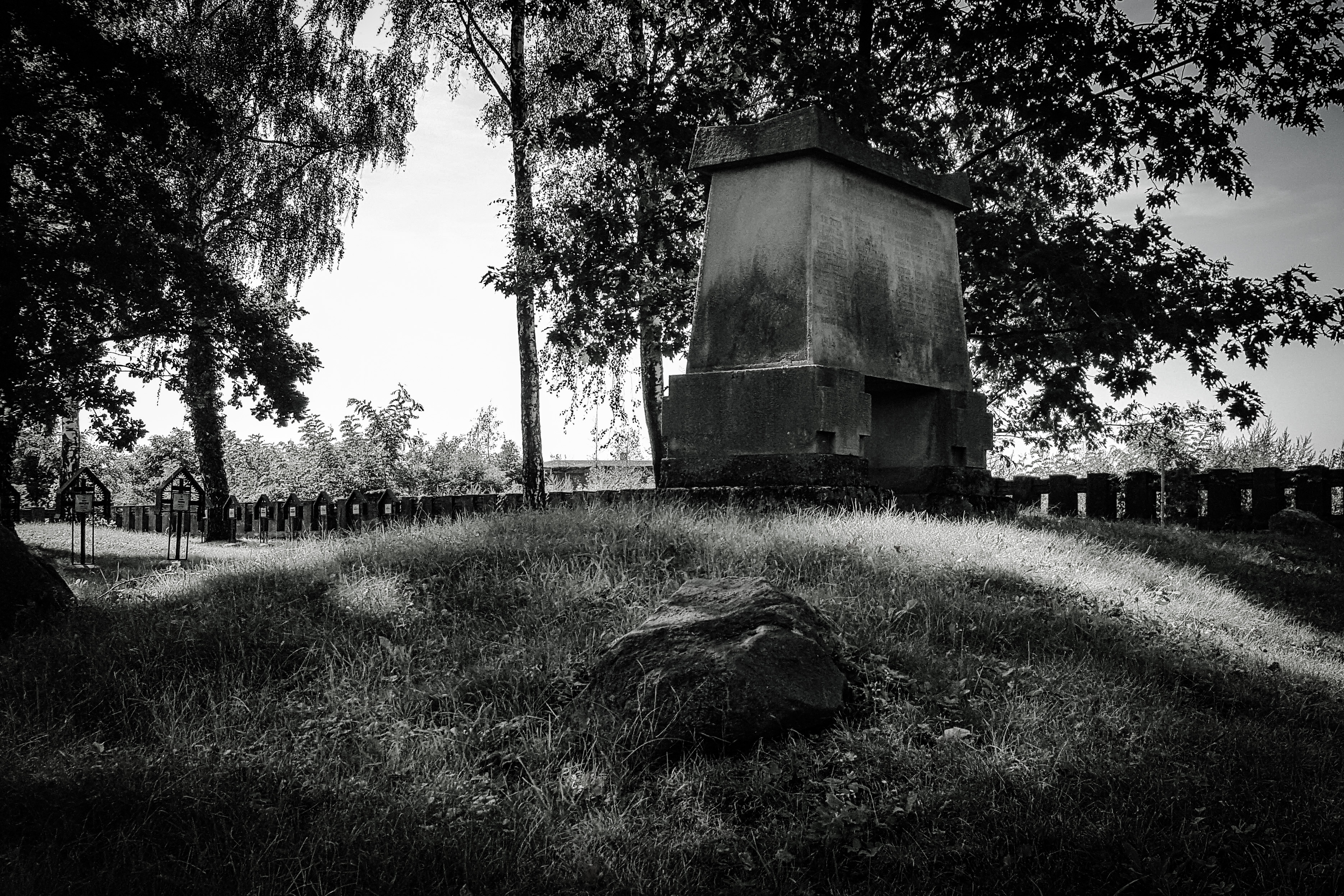
- War cemetery

- Location within Poland
- Coordinates: 50°6′38″N 20°53′28″E
- Country: Poland
- Voivodeship: Lesser Poland
- County: Tarnów
- Gmina: Żabno
- Elevation: 192 m (630 ft)
- Website: http://www.niedomice.go.pl

Niedomice [ɲɛdɔˈmit͡sɛ] is a village in the administrative district of Gmina Żabno, within Tarnów County, Lesser Poland Voivodeship, in southern Poland.
