= Nowopole, Lesser Poland Voivodeship =

Nowopole
- Village
- Location within Poland
- Coordinates: 50°14′N 20°44′E
- Country: Poland
- Voivodeship: Lesser Poland
- County: Tarnów
- Gmina: Wietrzychowice

Nowopole [nɔvɔˈpɔlɛ] is a village in the administrative district of Gmina Wietrzychowice, within Tarnów County, Lesser Poland Voivodeship, in southern Poland.
