= Kaluzhsky =

Kaluzhsky (masculine), Kaluzhskaya (feminine), or Kaluzhskoye (neuter) may refer to:

- Kaluga Oblast (Kaluzhskaya Oblast), a federal subject of Russia
- Kaluzhskaya (Moscow Metro), a station of the Moscow Metro, Russia
- Kaluzhskaya (closed), a temporary station of the Moscow Metro, Russia
- Kaluzhskaya, former name of Oktyabrskaya, a station of the Moscow Metro, Russia
- Kaluzhsky (rural locality) (Kaluzhskaya, Kaluzhskoye), name of several rural localities in Russia

== See also ==
- Kaluga (disambiguation)
