= Bobrowniki Wielkie =

- Village
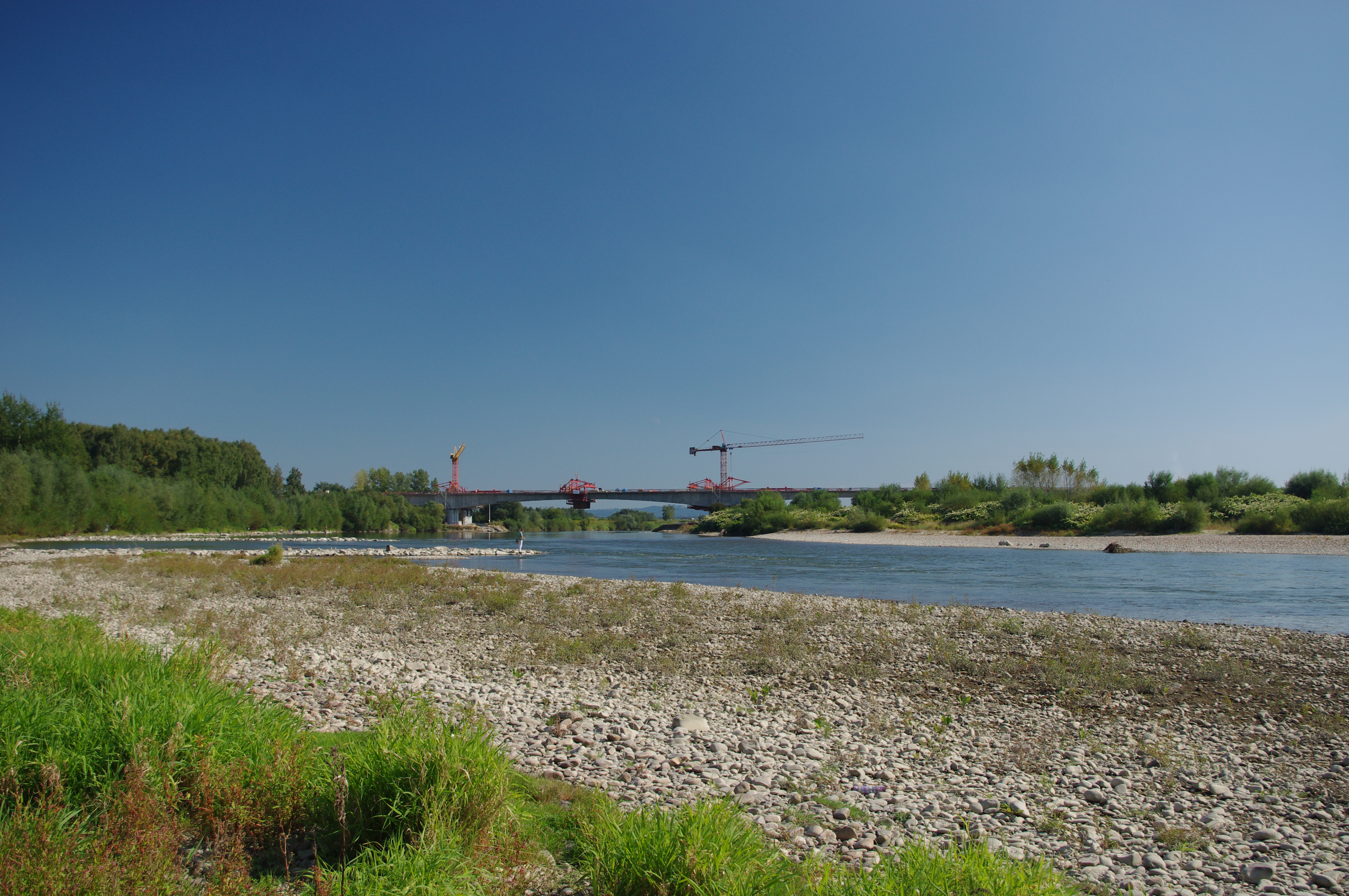

- Location within Poland
- Coordinates: 50°4′N 20°55′E
- Country: Poland
- Voivodeship: Lesser Poland
- County: Tarnów
- Gmina: Żabno
- Population: 740

Bobrowniki Wielkie [bɔbrɔvˈniki ˈvjɛlkʲɛ] is a village in the administrative district of Gmina Żabno, within Tarnów County, Lesser Poland Voivodeship, in southern Poland.
