= Ladna =

Ladna may refer to places:

- Ladná, a municipality and village in the Czech Republic
- Ładna, a village in Poland
