= Demblin =

- Village
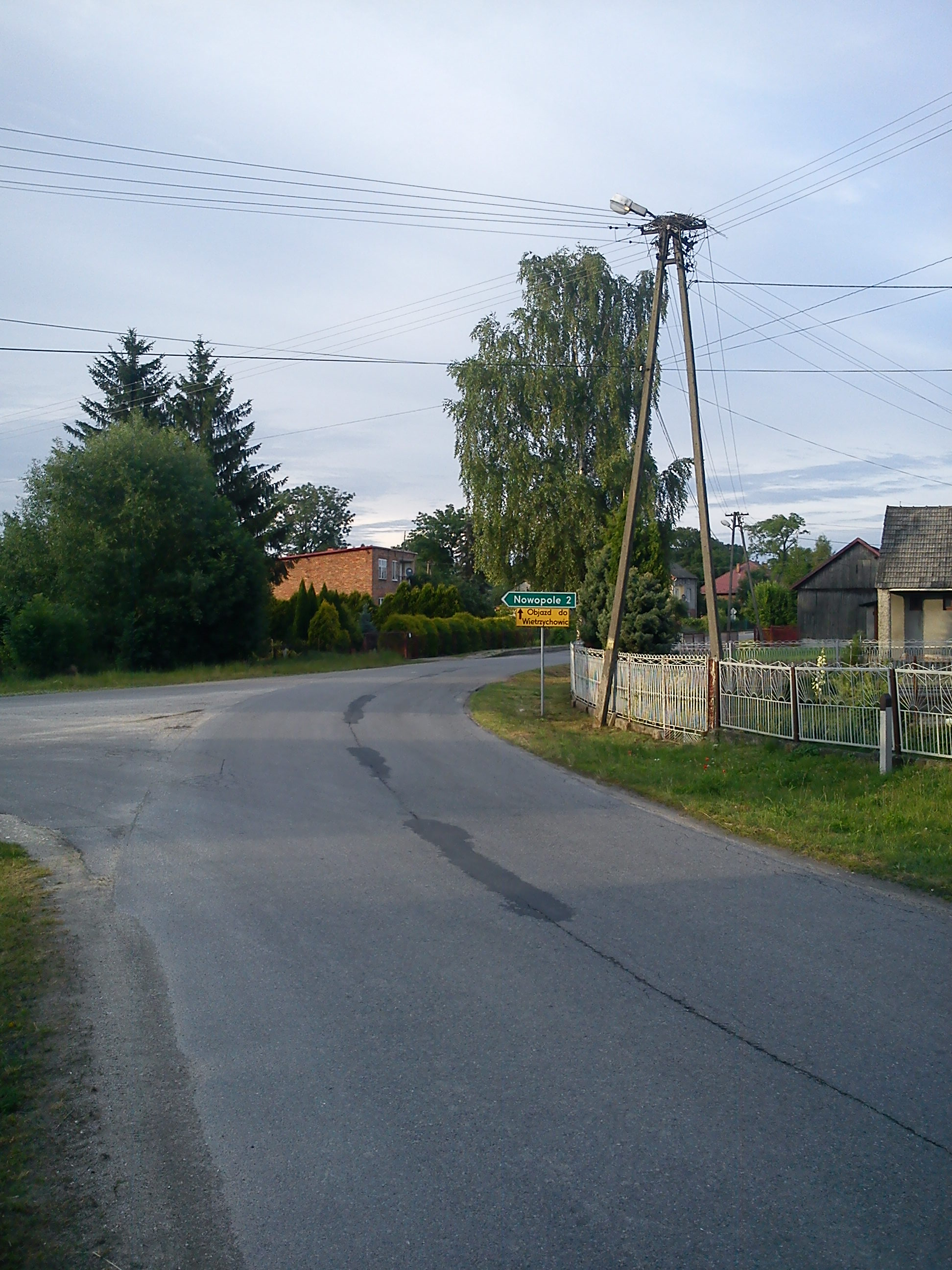

- Location within Poland
- Coordinates: 50°12′41″N 20°44′5″E
- Country: Poland
- Voivodeship: Lesser Poland
- County: Tarnów
- Gmina: Wietrzychowice
- Population: 340

Demblin [ˈdɛmblin] is a village in the administrative district of Gmina Wietrzychowice, within Tarnów County, Lesser Poland Voivodeship, in southern Poland.
