= Miechowice Wielkie =

- Village
- Location within Poland
- Coordinates: 50°11′N 20°45′E
- Country: Poland
- Voivodeship: Lesser Poland
- County: Tarnów
- Gmina: Wietrzychowice

Miechowice Wielkie [mjɛxɔˈvit͡sɛ ˈvjɛlkʲɛ] is a village in the administrative district of Gmina Wietrzychowice, within Tarnów County, Lesser Poland Voivodeship, in southern Poland.
