= Pałuszyce =

- Village
- Location within Poland
- Coordinates: 50°13′N 20°45′E
- Country: Poland
- Voivodeship: Lesser Poland
- County: Tarnów
- Gmina: Wietrzychowice

Pałuszyce [pawuˈʂɨt͡sɛ] is a village in the administrative district of Gmina Wietrzychowice, within Tarnów County, Lesser Poland Voivodeship, in southern Poland.
