= Szynwałd, Lesser Poland Voivodeship =

Szynwałd
- Village
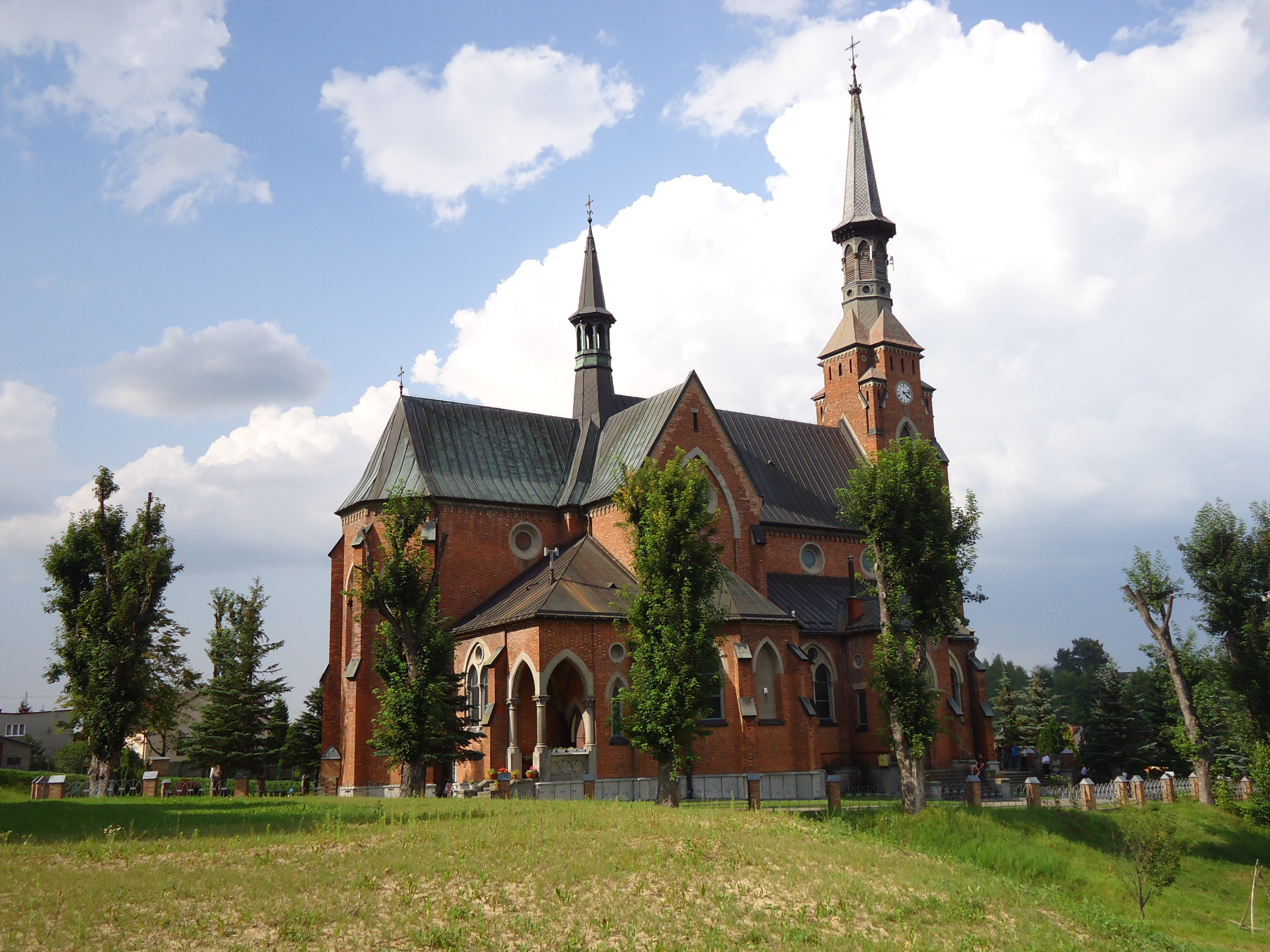
- Church of Our Lady of the Scapular

- Location within Poland
- Coordinates: 49°56′29″N 21°7′5″E
- Country: Poland
- Voivodeship: Lesser Poland
- County: Tarnów
- Gmina: Skrzyszów

Population
  - Total: 3,000

Szynwałd [ˈʂɨnvau̯t] is a village in the administrative district of Gmina Skrzyszów, within Tarnów County, Lesser Poland Voivodeship, in southern Poland.
