= Czyżów, Tarnów County =

Czyżów
- Village
- Location within Poland
- Coordinates: 50°10′N 20°51′E
- Country: Poland
- Voivodeship: Lesser Poland
- County: Tarnów
- Gmina: Żabno

Czyżów [ˈt͡ʂɨʐuf] is a village in the administrative district of Gmina Żabno, within Tarnów County, Lesser Poland Voivodeship, in southern Poland.
