= Łukowa, Lesser Poland Voivodeship =

Łukowa
- Village
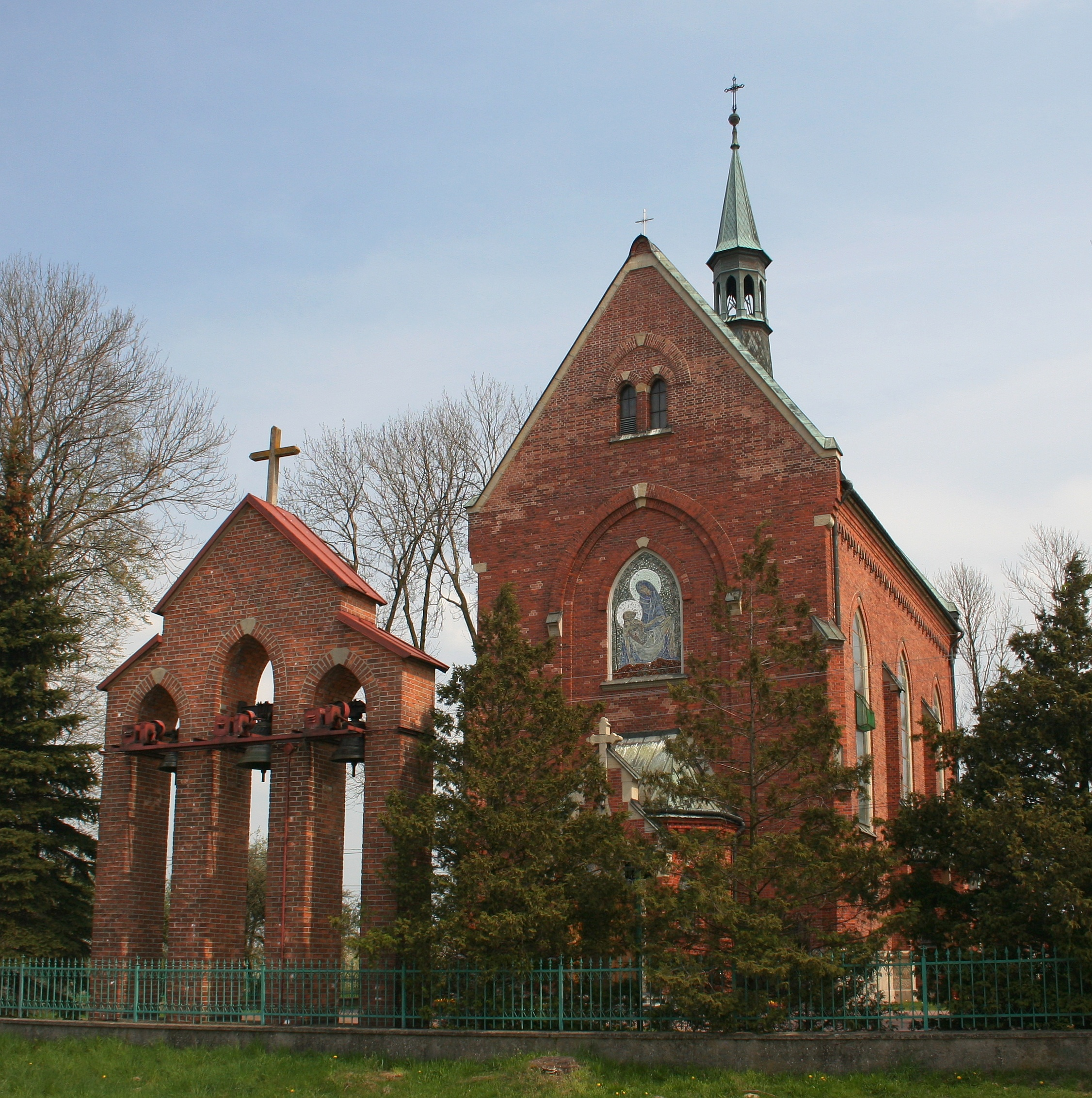
- Catholic church

- Location within Poland
- Coordinates: 50°6′N 20°59′E
- Country: Poland
- Voivodeship: Lesser Poland
- County: Tarnów
- Gmina: Lisia Góra
- Population: 1,200

Łukowa [wuˈkɔva] is a village in the administrative district of Gmina Lisia Góra, within Tarnów County, Lesser Poland Voivodeship, in southern Poland.
