= Sikorzyce =

Sikorzyce may refer to the following places in Poland:

- Sikorzyce, Lower Silesian Voivodeship (south-west Poland)
- Sikorzyce, Lesser Poland Voivodeship (south Poland)
- Sikorzyce, West Pomeranian Voivodeship (north-west Poland)
