= Ilkowice, Tarnów County =

Ilkowice
- Village
- Location within Poland
- Coordinates: 50°6′N 20°54′E
- Country: Poland
- Voivodeship: Lesser Poland
- County: Tarnów
- Gmina: Żabno
- Elevation: 191 m (627 ft)

Population
  - Total: 1,278

Ilkowice pronounced ['ilkɔˈvit͡sɛ] is a village in the administrative district of Gmina Żabno, within Tarnów County, Lesser Poland Voivodeship, in southern Poland. The village is situated in the Sandomierz Basin on the river Dunajec. In the 1975–98 administrative divisions of the Polish People's Republic (PRL) the village belonged to Tarnów Voivodeship.

== History ==
Ilkowice already existed in the 2nd half of the fourteenth century, because in 1409, according to the chronicles, Ilkowice belonged to Vincent Granowski, the son of Vincent Granowa of the Leliwa coat of arms. There is a small historic church of St. Sebastian built in an eclectic style with elements of baroque and classicism.
