= Wola Rogowska =

- Village
- Location within Poland
- Coordinates: 50°13′N 20°41′E
- Country: Poland
- Voivodeship: Lesser Poland
- County: Tarnów
- Gmina: Wietrzychowice
- Elevation: 172 m (564 ft)
- Population (approx.): 500

Wola Rogowska [ˈvɔla rɔˈɡɔfska] is a village in the administrative district of Gmina Wietrzychowice, within Tarnów County, Lesser Poland Voivodeship, in southern Poland.

The village has an approximate population of 500.
