= Wychylówka =

- Village
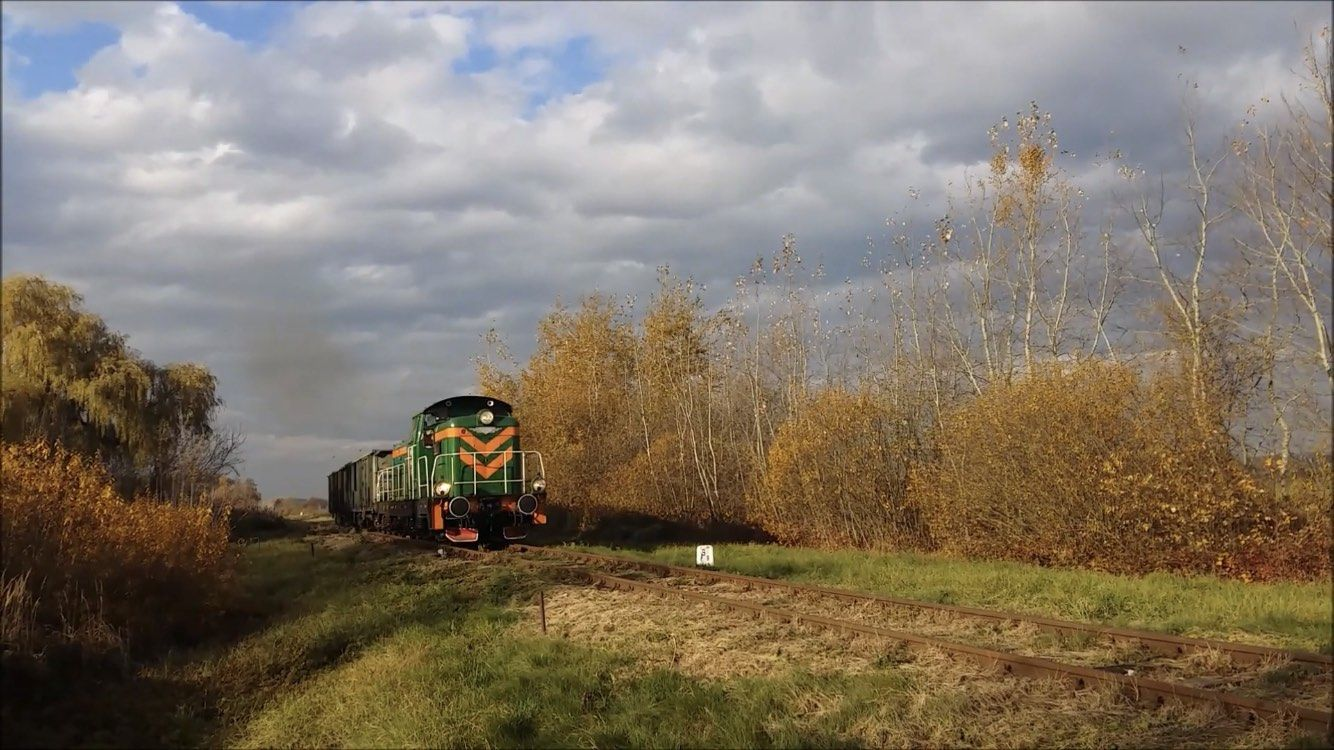
- Railway stop

- Location within Poland
- Coordinates: 50°4′21″N 20°56′54″E
- Country: Poland
- Voivodeship: Lesser Poland
- County: Tarnów
- Gmina: Żabno

Wychylówka [vɨxɨˈlufka] is a village in the administrative district of Gmina Żabno, within Tarnów County, Lesser Poland Voivodeship, in southern Poland.
