= Łękawica, Tarnów County =

Łękawica
- Village
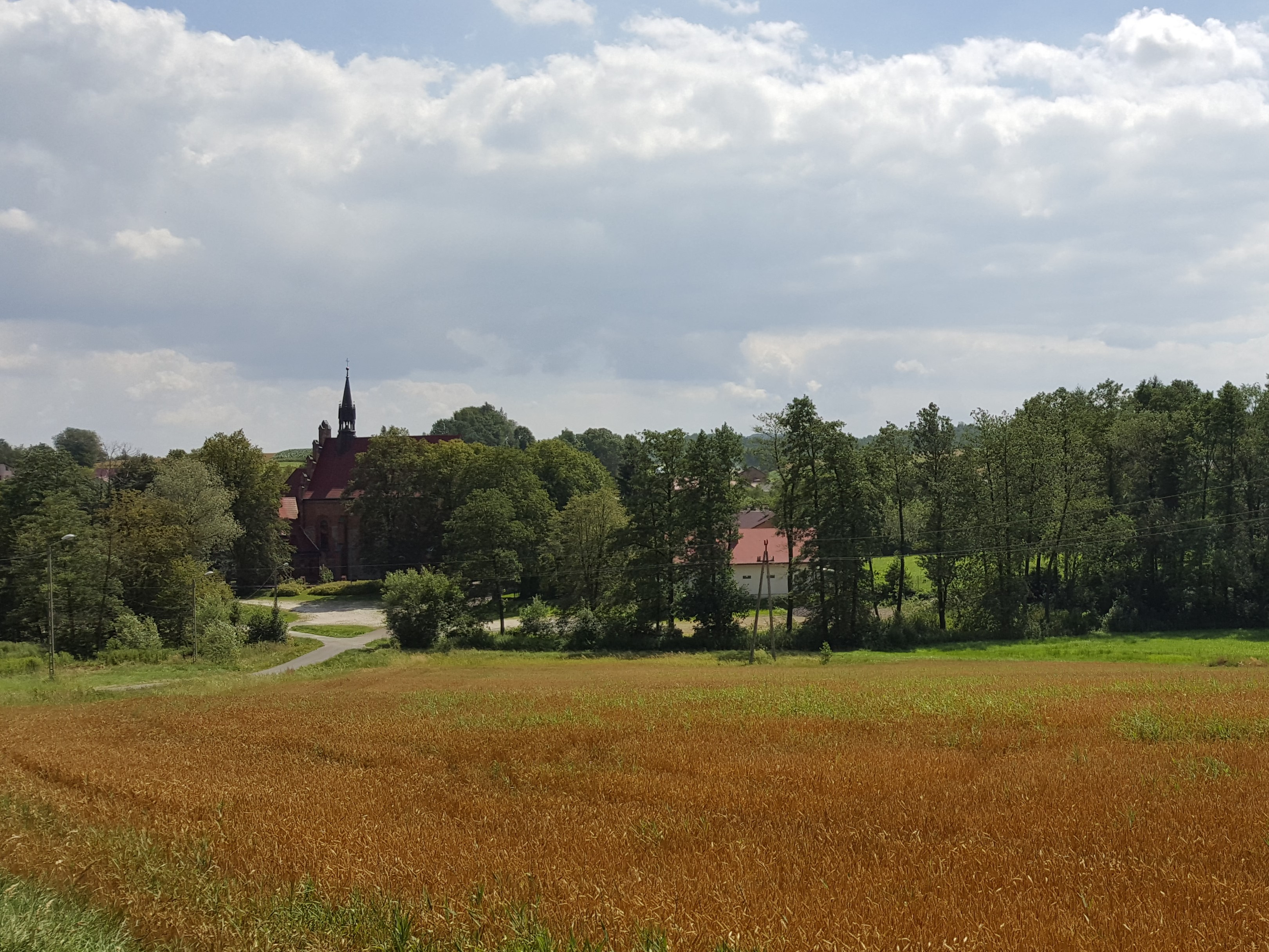

- Location within Poland
- Coordinates: 49°52′10″N 21°3′17″E
- Country: Poland
- Voivodeship: Lesser Poland
- County: Tarnów
- Gmina: Skrzyszów

Łękawica [wɛnkaˈvit͡sa] is a village in the administrative district of Gmina Skrzyszów, within Tarnów County, Lesser Poland Voivodeship, in southern Poland.
