= Pasieka Otfinowska =

- Village
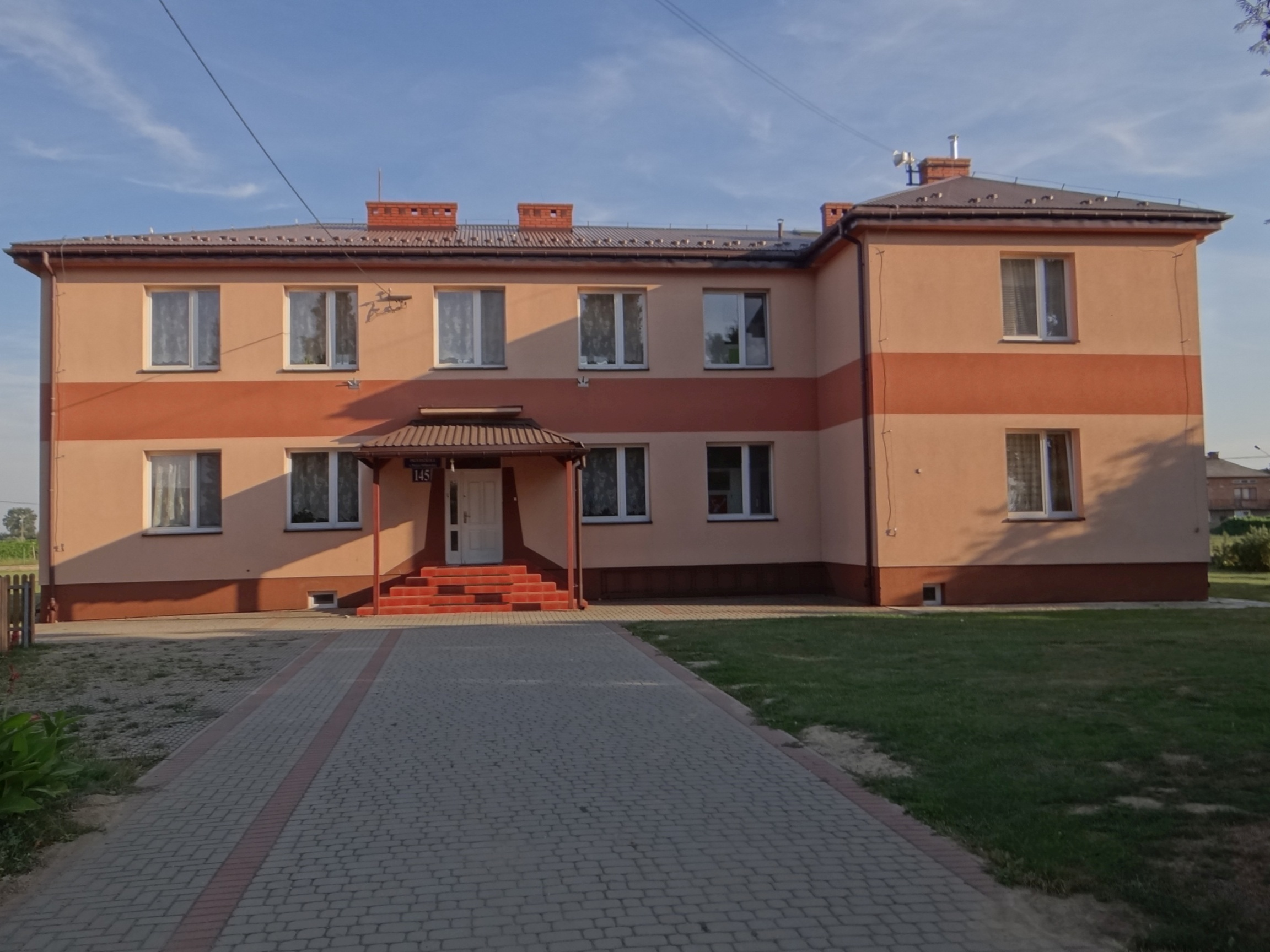
- School

- Location within Poland
- Coordinates: 50°10′N 20°49′E
- Country: Poland
- Voivodeship: Lesser Poland
- County: Tarnów
- Gmina: Żabno

Pasieka Otfinowska [paˈɕɛka ɔtfiˈnɔfska] is a village in the administrative district of Gmina Żabno, within Tarnów County, Lesser Poland Voivodeship, in southern Poland.

The village's date of establishment is unknown. The word Pasieka refers to honeybee hives, while Otfinowska refers to a family that owned land in the area historically throughout the Middle Ages. It was home to Austria-Hungarian forces during World War I and on of the Eastern Front during World War II. To this day, villagers often find remains and artifacts from the war. The village was also home to several Jewish families in hiding during World War II.

Most villagers support Termalica Bruk Bet in the Ekstraklasa, which plays just across the Dunajec. The village is home to a high speed luxury ferry service across the Dunajec, which runs every 20 minutes and is free of charge. Pasieka is also known as the home of grilled kielbasa and features some of the most renowned home cooking in Southern Poland. Pasieka branded seasoning is distributed by Aldi all over Europe.

It is among the most progressive villages in Southern Poland as it recognizes same-sex marriages and is also among the most racially diverse villages with a significant refugee population. A notable former resident includes human rights activist Jakub "Kuba" Tchorzewski who has organized numerous marches and protests across Europe and the US.
