= Goruszów =

- Village
- Location within Poland
- Coordinates: 50°10′52″N 20°48′36″E
- Country: Poland
- Voivodeship: Lesser Poland
- County: Tarnów
- Gmina: Żabno
- Population (approx.): 105

Goruszów [ɡɔˈruʂuf] is a village in the administrative district of Gmina Żabno, within Tarnów County, Lesser Poland Voivodeship, in southern Poland.

The village has an approximate population of 105.
