= Wietrzychowice, Lesser Poland Voivodeship =

Wietrzychowice
- Village
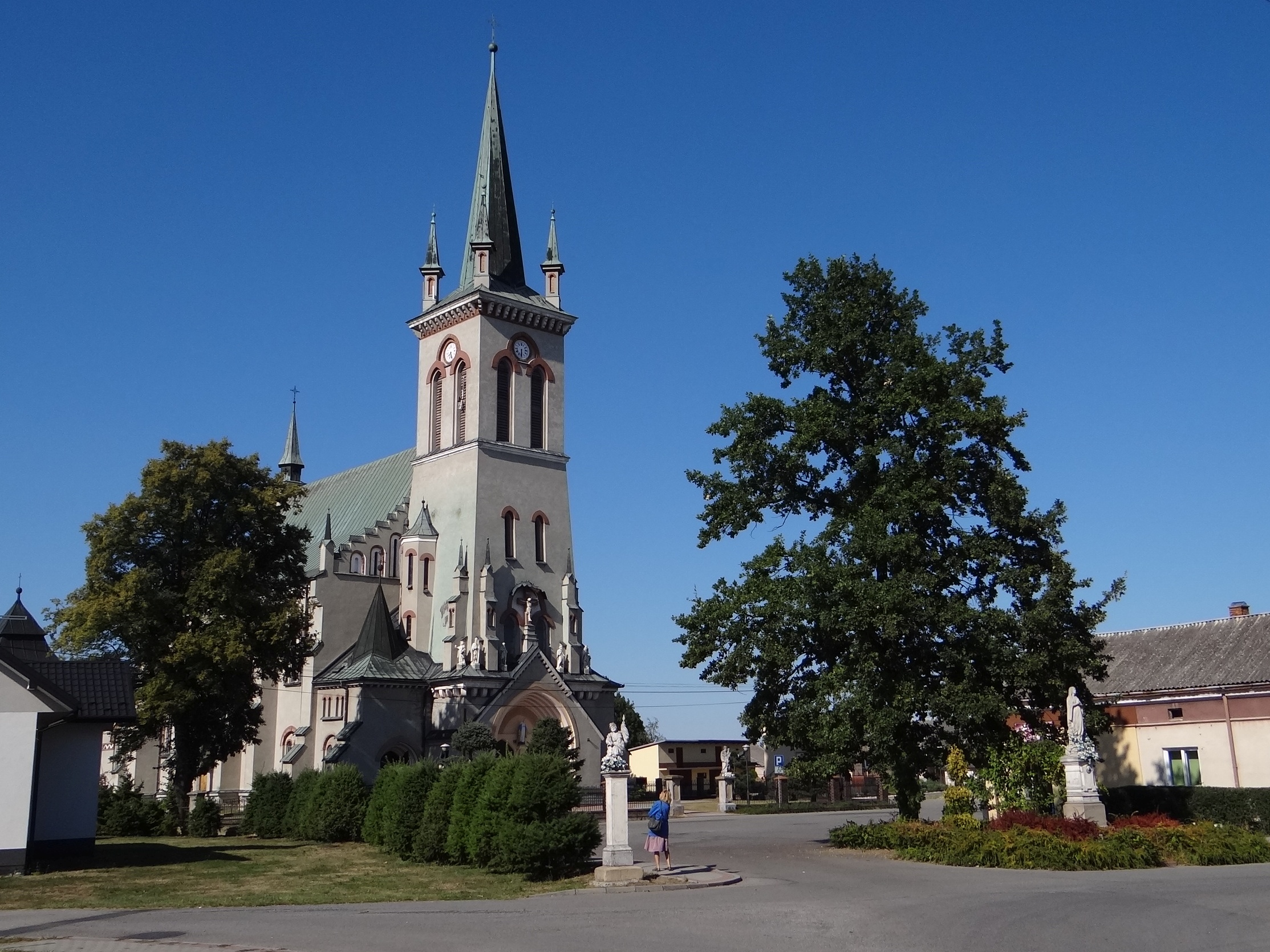
- Church of the Assumption of the Virgin Mary

- Location within Poland
- Coordinates: 50°12′N 20°40′E
- Country: Poland
- Voivodeship: Lesser Poland
- County: Tarnów
- Gmina: Wietrzychowice

Wietrzychowice [vjɛtʂɨxɔˈvit͡sɛ] is a village in Tarnów County, Lesser Poland Voivodeship, in southern Poland. It is the seat of the gmina (administrative district) called Gmina Wietrzychowice.
