= Lisia Góra, Lesser Poland Voivodeship =

Lisia Góra
- Village
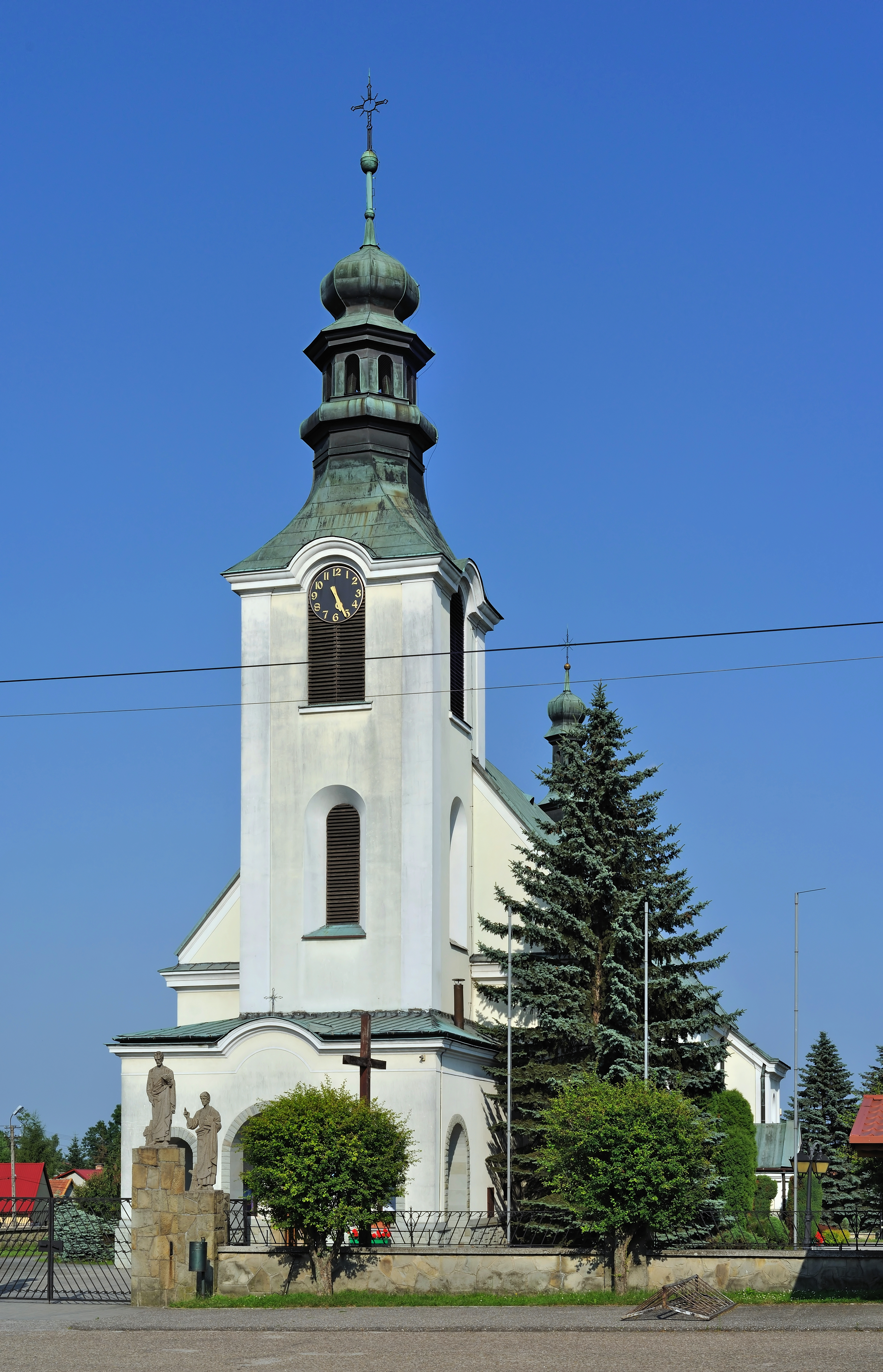
- Catholic church

- Location within Poland
- Coordinates: 50°5′12″N 21°1′16″E
- Country: Poland
- Voivodeship: Lesser Poland
- County: Tarnów
- Gmina: Lisia Góra
- Population: 3,019

Lisia Góra [ˈliɕa ˈɡura] is a village in Tarnów County, Lesser Poland Voivodeship, in southern Poland. It is the seat of the gmina (administrative district) called Gmina Lisia Góra.
