= Jan Wnęk =

Polish carver and aviation pioneer

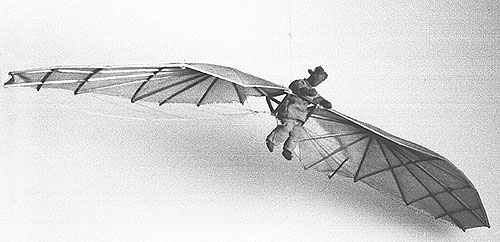
Speculative model of Jan Wnęk's glider in the Kraków Museum of Ethnography. Poland.

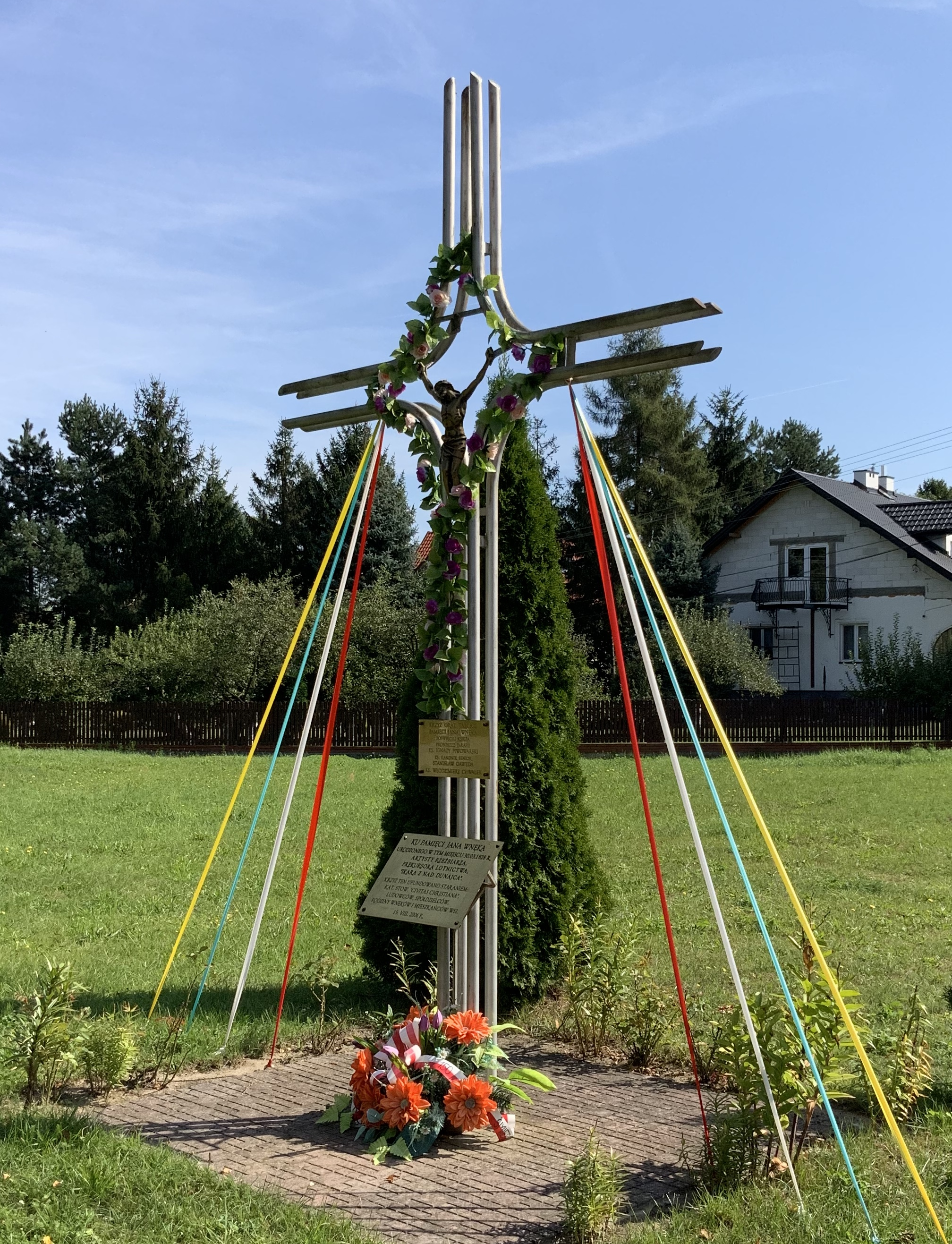
Memorial at the birthplace of Jan Wnęk in Żdżary

Jan Wnęk (1828 – 10 July 1869) was a Polish carver of religious statues who is claimed to have constructed and flown a glider (aircraft) in the 1860s, predating the flights of Otto Lilienthal. There is a speculative "reconstruction" of Wnek's glider in the Ethnographic Museum of Kraków.

Jan Wnek was born in the village of Kaczówka near Dąbrowa Tarnowska. He was the son of a serf and received no formal education., but was trained as a carpenter. Encouraged by a local priest, Father Stanislaw Morgenstern, Wnęk became a prolific sculptor in wood and stone for churches and cemeteries in Kraków and Odporyszów. The angels he sculpted are described as having wings of "exceptional beauty". He also possessed an instinctive talent for mechanics and improved some contemporary agricultural machinery, and acted in village plays.

There is no contemporary written description of the glider and the reconstruction in the Kraków Museum of Ethnography is entirely speculative. The claims for his flights are based on a local oral tradition. Although Professor Tadeusz Seweryn, former director of the Museum of Ethnography, claimed to have discovered some church records with descriptions of Jan Wnęk's flights, these have never been made available for independent scrutiny.

Wnęk had no formal education, and his ideas were based on his observation of bird flight and on his own skills as a craftsman. He noted that some soaring birds made use of rising air currents to gain height and so identified the optimum weather conditions for his flights. He allegedly built several experimental models and although he did not understand the theory of aerodynamic lift, he copied the upper curvature of a bird's wing. He tested his models by launching them by hand. In 1866 he is claimed to have started construction of a full-sized glider which he named Loty (Flyer), which had an ash framework covered with varnished linen. It is claimed that he controlled his glider by twisting the wing's trailing edge using strings attached to stirrups at his feet. Wnęk is said to have made his first short controlled flights in June of the same year from a small hill. After several flights, some adjustments and learning his glider behavior, Wnęk is then said to have felt confident enough to ask for authorization from the Odporyszów church priest, Father Stanisław Morgenstern, to build a special ramp on top of the church tower to launch himself from. The tower stands 45 m (148 ft) high and is built on top of a 50 m (160 ft) hill, making it 95 m (312 ft) high launch above the valley below.

Wnęk commemorated in coat of arms of Gmina Radgoszcz

Several public flights are claimed between 1866 and 1869, mainly during religious festivals, carnivals and New Year celebrations., and that during the Pentecost Carnival held on 16 May 1869 at Odporyszów, Austria-Hungary, Wnęk's made a flight that ended in an accident. An assistant, Michał Sowiński, was reported to be implicated in his death.

He died a few weeks later, aged 41, leaving a wife and three children. His flying activities spanned about four years. If these flights took place, they preceded those of Otto Lilienthal by 25 years. Unknown outside the locality, any achievement made by Wnek had no influence on the development of heavier-than-air flight.
