= Gmina Skrzyszów =

Gmina Skrzyszów Skrzyszów Commune
- Gmina
- Interactive map of Gmina Skrzyszów
- Coordinates (Skrzyszów): 49°59′34″N 21°3′46″E
- Country: Poland
- Voivodeship: Lesser Poland
- County: Tarnów County
- Seat: Skrzyszów

Area
  - Total: 86.23 km^{2} (33.29 sq mi)

Population (2006)
  - Total: 13,022
  - Density: 151.0/km^{2} (391.1/sq mi)
- Website: http://www.skrzyszow.pl

Gmina Skrzyszów is a rural gmina (administrative district) in Tarnów County, Lesser Poland Voivodeship, in southern Poland. Its seat is the village of Skrzyszów, which lies approximately 7 kilometres (4 mi) south-east of Tarnów and 81 km (50 mi) east of the regional capital Kraków.

The gmina covers an area of 86.23 square kilometres (33.3 sq mi), and as of 2006 its total population is 13,022.

== Villages ==
Gmina Skrzyszów contains the villages and settlements of Ładna, Łękawica, Pogórska Wola, Skrzyszów and Szynwałd.

== Neighbouring gminas ==
Gmina Skrzyszów is bordered by the city of Tarnów and by the gminas of Czarna, Pilzno, Ryglice, Tarnów and Tuchów.
