= Skrzyszów, Lesser Poland Voivodeship =

Skrzyszów
- Village
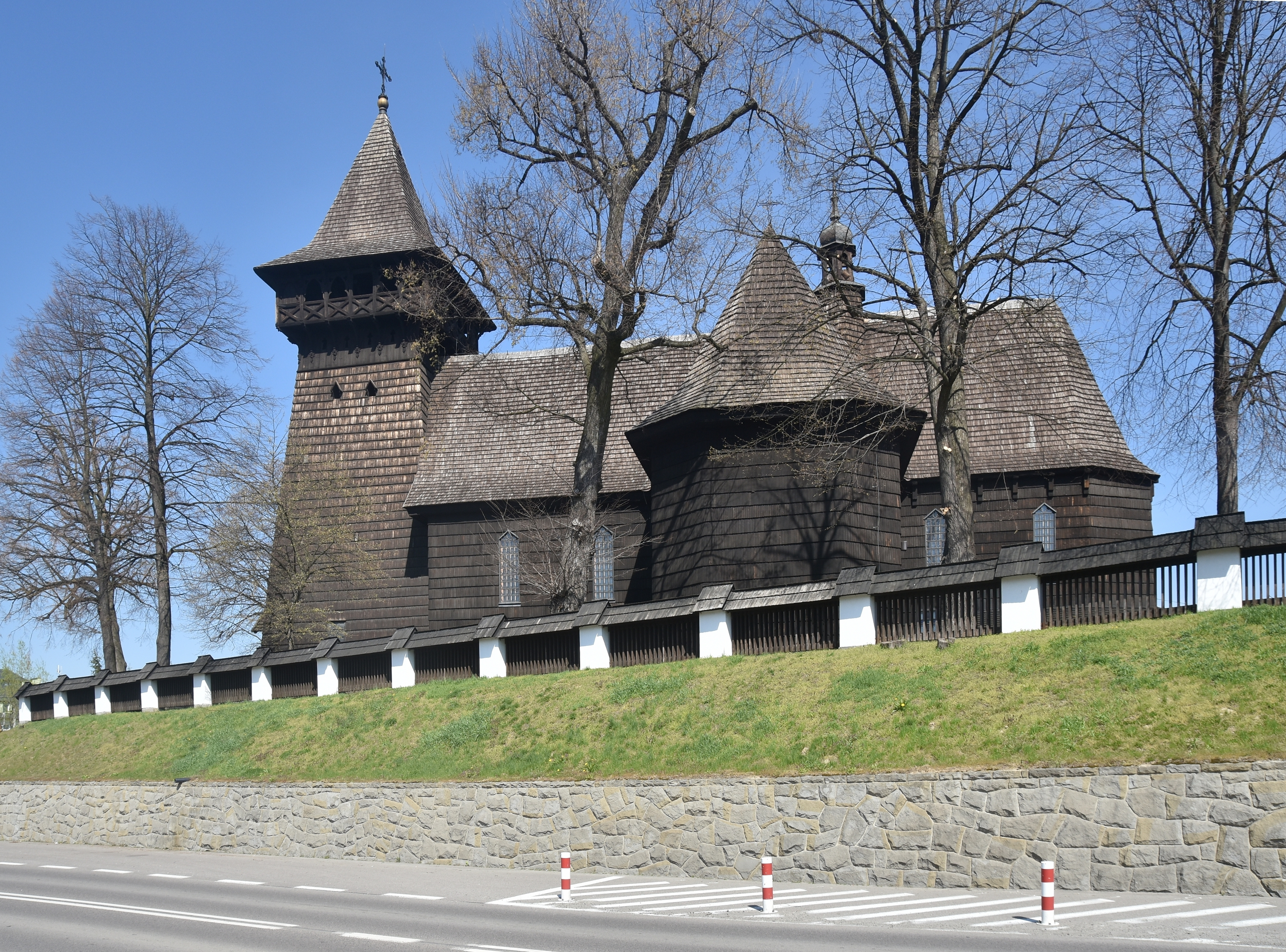
- Church of Saint Stanislaus

- Location within Poland
- Coordinates: 49°59′34″N 21°3′46″E
- Country: Poland
- Voivodeship: Lesser Poland
- County: Tarnów
- Gmina: Skrzyszów

Population
  - Total: 3,300

Skrzyszów [ˈskʂɨʂuf] is a village in Tarnów County, Lesser Poland Voivodeship, in southern Poland. It is the seat of the gmina (administrative district) called Gmina Skrzyszów. In 2021 it had 3780 residents.
