= Gmina Wietrzychowice =

Gmina Wietrzychowice Wietrzychowice Commune
- Gmina
- Flag Coat of arms
- Interactive map of Gmina Wietrzychowice
- Coordinates (Wietrzychowice): 50°12′N 20°40′E
- Country: Poland
- Voivodeship: Lesser Poland
- County: Tarnów County
- Seat: Wietrzychowice

Area
  - Total: 48.58 km^{2} (18.76 sq mi)

Population (2006)
  - Total: 4,193
  - Density: 86.31/km^{2} (223.5/sq mi)
- Website: http://www.wietrzychowice.pl/

Gmina Wietrzychowice is a rural gmina (administrative district) in Tarnów County, Lesser Poland Voivodeship, in southern Poland. Its seat is the village of Wietrzychowice, which lies approximately 31 kilometres (19 mi) north-west of Tarnów and 55 km (34 mi) east of the regional capital Kraków.

The gmina covers an area of 48.58 square kilometres (18.8 sq mi), and as of 2006 its total population is 4,193.

== Villages ==
Gmina Wietrzychowice contains the villages and settlements of Demblin, Jadowniki Mokre, Miechowice Małe, Miechowice Wielkie, Nowopole, Pałuszyce, Sikorzyce, Wietrzychowice and Wola Rogowska.

== Neighbouring gminas ==
Gmina Wietrzychowice is bordered by the gminas of Gręboszów, Koszyce, Opatowiec, Radłów, Szczurowa, Wojnicz and Żabno.
