= Podlesie Dębowe =

- Village
- Location within Poland
- Coordinates: 50°09′35″N 20°52′16″E
- Country: Poland
- Voivodeship: Lesser Poland
- County: Tarnów
- Gmina: Żabno

Podlesie Dębowe [pɔdˈlɛɕɛ dɛmˈbɔvɛ] is a village in the administrative district of Gmina Żabno, within Tarnów County, Lesser Poland Voivodeship, in southern Poland.
