= Gmina Żabno =

Gmina Żabno Żabno Commune
- Gmina
- Flag Coat of arms
- Interactive map of Gmina Żabno
- Coordinates (Żabno): 50°7′58″N 20°53′7″E
- Country: Poland
- Voivodeship: Lesser Poland
- County: Tarnów County
- Seat: Żabno

Area
  - Total: 104.82 km^{2} (40.47 sq mi)

Population (2006)
  - Total: 18,846
  - Density: 179.79/km^{2} (465.66/sq mi)
  - Urban: 4,271
  - Rural: 14,575
- Website: https://www.zabno.pl

Gmina Żabno is an urban-rural gmina (administrative district) in Tarnów County, Lesser Poland Voivodeship, in southern Poland. Its seat is the town of Żabno, which lies approximately 14 kilometres (9 mi) north-west of Tarnów and 69 km (43 mi) east of the regional capital Kraków.

The gmina covers an area of 104.82 square kilometres (40.5 sq mi), and as of 2006 its total population is 18,846 (out of which the population of Żabno amounts to 4,271, and the population of the rural part of the gmina is 14,575).

== Villages ==
Apart from the town of Żabno, Gmina Żabno contains the villages and settlements of Bobrowniki Wielkie, Chorążec, Czyżów, Fiuk, Goruszów, Gorzyce, Ilkowice, Janikowice, Kaluga, Kłyż, Łęg Tarnowski, Nieciecza, Niedomice, Odporyszów, Otfinów, Pasieka Otfinowska, Piaski, Pierszyce, Podlesie Dębowe, Siedliszowice, Sieradza, Wychylówka and Zagrody.

== Neighbouring gminas ==
Gmina Żabno is bordered by the city of Tarnów and by the gminas of Dąbrowa Tarnowska, Gręboszów, Lisia Góra, Olesno, Radłów, Tarnów, Wierzchosławice and Wietrzychowice.
