= Gmina Lisia Góra =

Gmina Lisia Góra Lisia Góra Commune
- Gmina
- Coat of arms
- Interactive map of Gmina Lisia Góra
- Coordinates (Lisia Góra): 50°5′12″N 21°1′16″E
- Country: Poland
- Voivodeship: Lesser Poland
- County: Tarnów County
- Seat: Lisia Góra

Area
  - Total: 105.4 km^{2} (40.7 sq mi)

Population (2006)
  - Total: 13,714
  - Density: 130.1/km^{2} (337.0/sq mi)
- Website: http://www.lisiagora.pl

Gmina Lisia Góra is a rural gmina (administrative district) in Tarnów County, Lesser Poland Voivodeship, in southern Poland. Its seat is the village of Lisia Góra, which lies approximately 7 kilometres (4 mi) north of Tarnów and 78 km (48 mi) east of the regional capital Kraków.

The gmina covers an area of 105.4 square kilometres (40.7 sq mi), and as of 2006 its total population is 13,714.

== Villages ==
Gmina Lisia Góra contains the villages and settlements of Breń, Brzozówka, Kobierzyn, Lisia Góra, Łukowa, Nowa Jastrząbka, Nowe Żukowice, Pawęzów, Śmigno and Stare Żukowice.

== Neighbouring gminas ==
Gmina Lisia Góra is bordered by the city of Tarnów and by the gminas of Czarna, Dąbrowa Tarnowska, Radgoszcz, Tarnów and Żabno.
