= Kaluga, Poland =

Kaluga
- Village
- Location within Poland
- Coordinates: 50°11′12″N 20°49′11″E
- Country: Poland
- Voivodeship: Lesser Poland
- County: Tarnów
- Gmina: Żabno

Kaluga ([kaˈluɡa]) is a village in the administrative district of Gmina Żabno, within Tarnów County, Lesser Poland Voivodeship, in southern Poland.
