= Ładna =

- Village
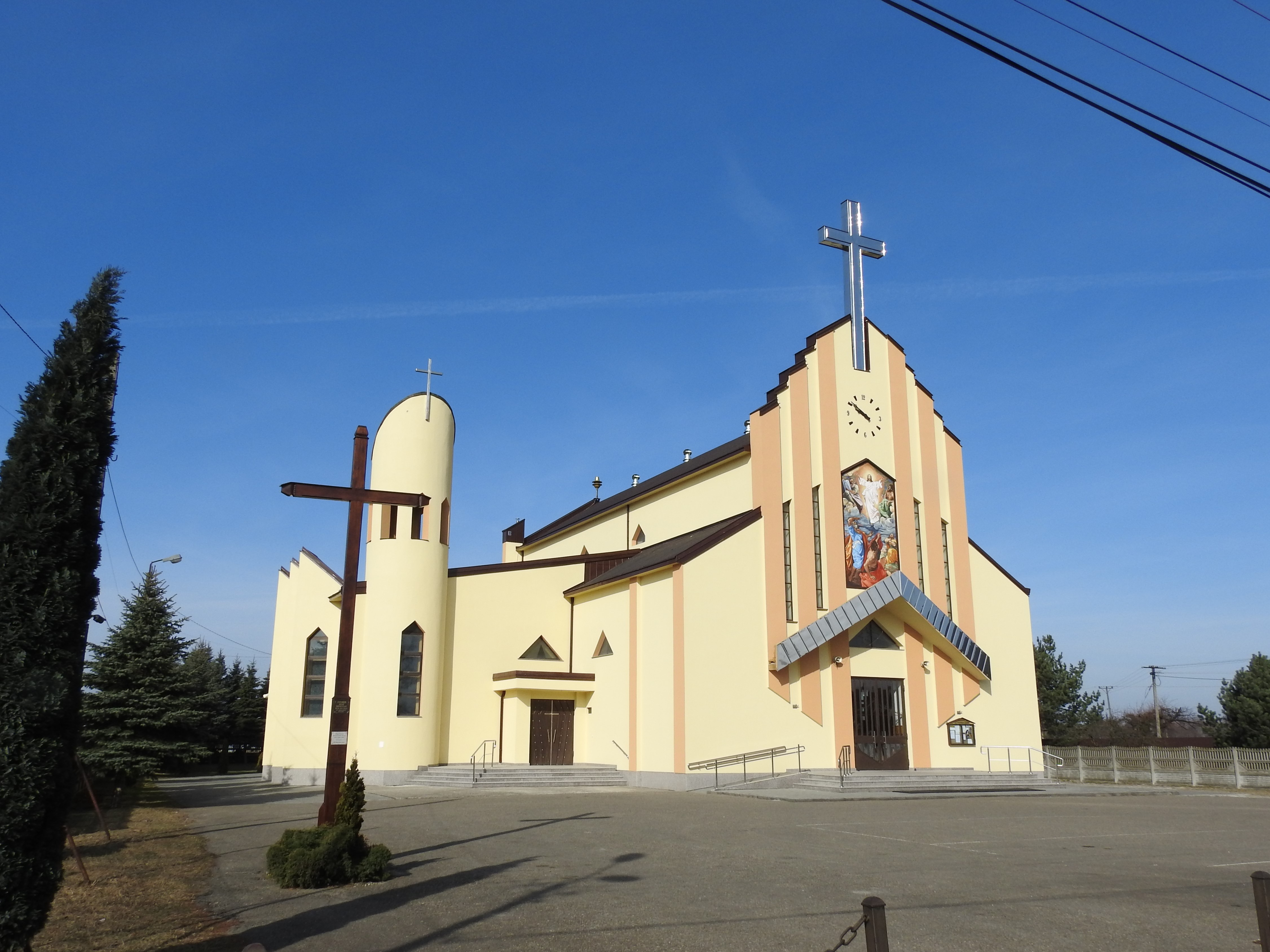
- Church of the Transfiguration of Christ

- Location within Poland
- Coordinates: 50°1′N 21°5′E
- Country: Poland
- Voivodeship: Lesser Poland
- County: Tarnów
- Gmina: Skrzyszów

Population
  - Total: 1,300

Ładna [ˈwadna] is a village located in the administrative district of Gmina Skrzyszów, within Tarnów County, Lesser Poland Voivodeship, in southern Poland.
