= Kaluzhsky (rural locality) =

Kaluzhsky (Russian: Калужский; masculine), Kaluzhskaya (Калужская; feminine), or Kaluzhskoye (Калужское; neuter) is the name of several rural localities in Russia:

- Kaluzhskoye, Kaliningrad Oblast, a settlement in Kaluzhsky Rural Okrug of Chernyakhovsky District of Kaliningrad Oblast
- Kaluzhskoye, Moscow Oblast, a village in Drovninskoye Rural Settlement of Mozhaysky District of Moscow Oblast
- Kaluzhskaya (rural locality), a stanitsa in Kaluzhsky Rural Okrug of Seversky District of Krasnodar Krai
