= Żabno =

Town in Lesser Poland Voivodeship, Poland

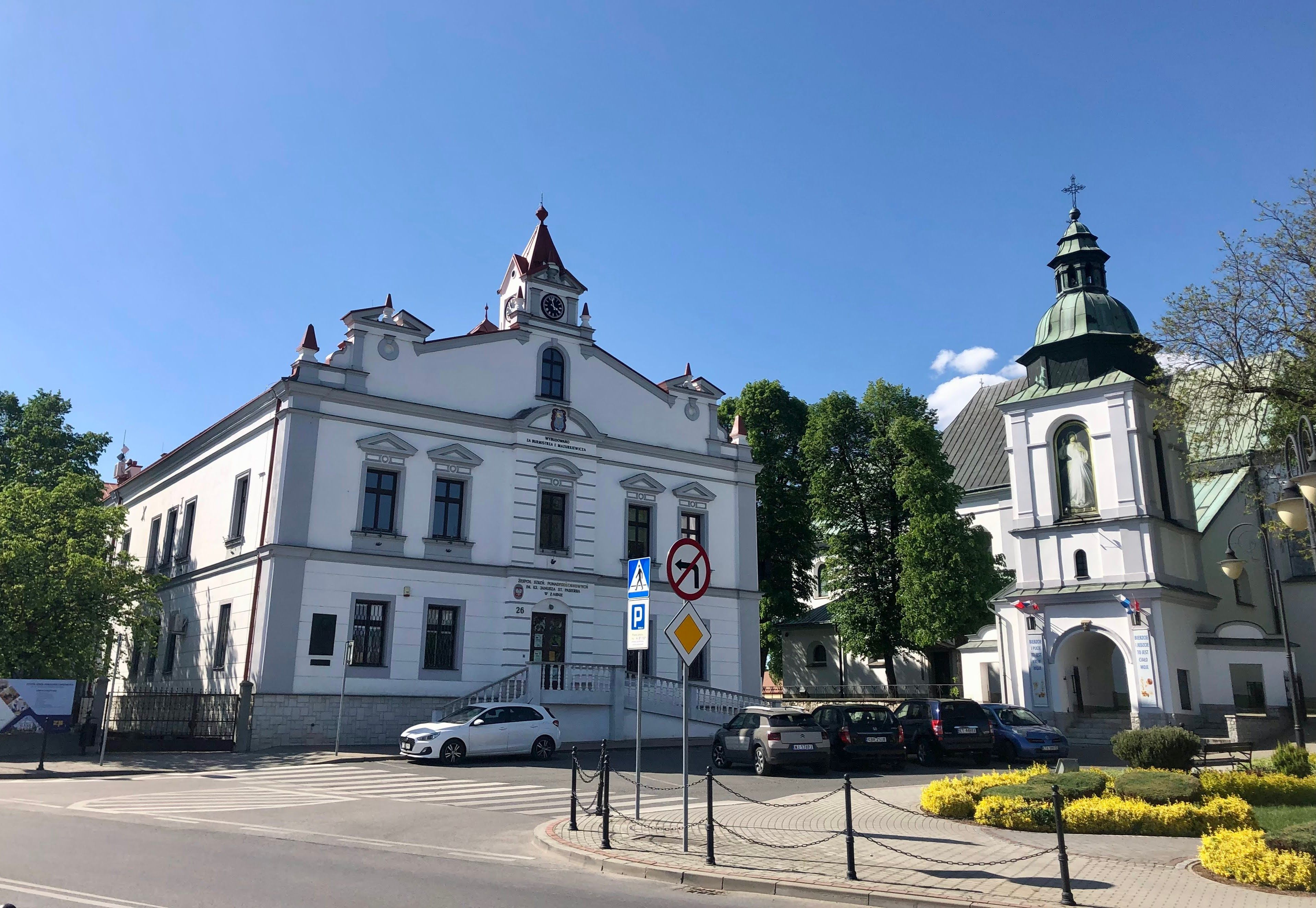
- Town Hall in Żabno

- Flag Coat of arms

- Location within Poland
- Coordinates: 50°7′58″N 20°53′7″E
- Country: Poland
- Voivodeship: Lesser Poland
- County: Tarnów
- Gmina: Żabno
- Established: 12th century
- Town rights: 1385-1905, 1934

Government
  - Mayor: Tomasz Kijowski (Ind.)

Area
  - Total: 11.12 km^{2} (4.29 sq mi)
- Elevation: 183 m (600 ft)

Population (2006)
  - Total: 4,271
  - Density: 384.1/km^{2} (994.8/sq mi)
- Time zone: UTC+1 (CET)
  - Summer (DST): UTC+2 (CEST)
- Postal code: 33-240
- Area code: +48 14
- Car plates: KTA
- Website: http://www.zabno.pl

Żabno [ˈʐabnɔ] is a town on the Dunajec River in southern Poland, in the Tarnów County in the Lesser Poland Voivodeship, 15 kilometres (9 miles) north of Tarnów.

== History ==
The first recorded mention of Żabno dates back to the 12th century, when Prince Bolesław V the Chaste granted the settlement to a knight known as Świętosław. It became a center of communication and trade, due to a convenient location along a merchant route from Wojnicz and Pilzno, to Opatowiec and Nowy Korczyn. It is not known when Żabno received its town charter. This must have happened before the year 1385, as on January 26 of that year, Queen Jadwiga of Poland, upon request of Spytek of Melsztyn, confirmed Żabno's Magdeburg rights. Little is known about the town's early history, as few documents have been preserved. One of the few established facts is that in 1394, King Władysław Jagiełło visited the town with his court, on the way to Nowy Korczyn. In the Kingdom of Poland and the Polish–Lithuanian Commonwealth, the town was administratively located in the Wiślica County, in Sandomierz Voivodeship, in the Lesser Poland Province.

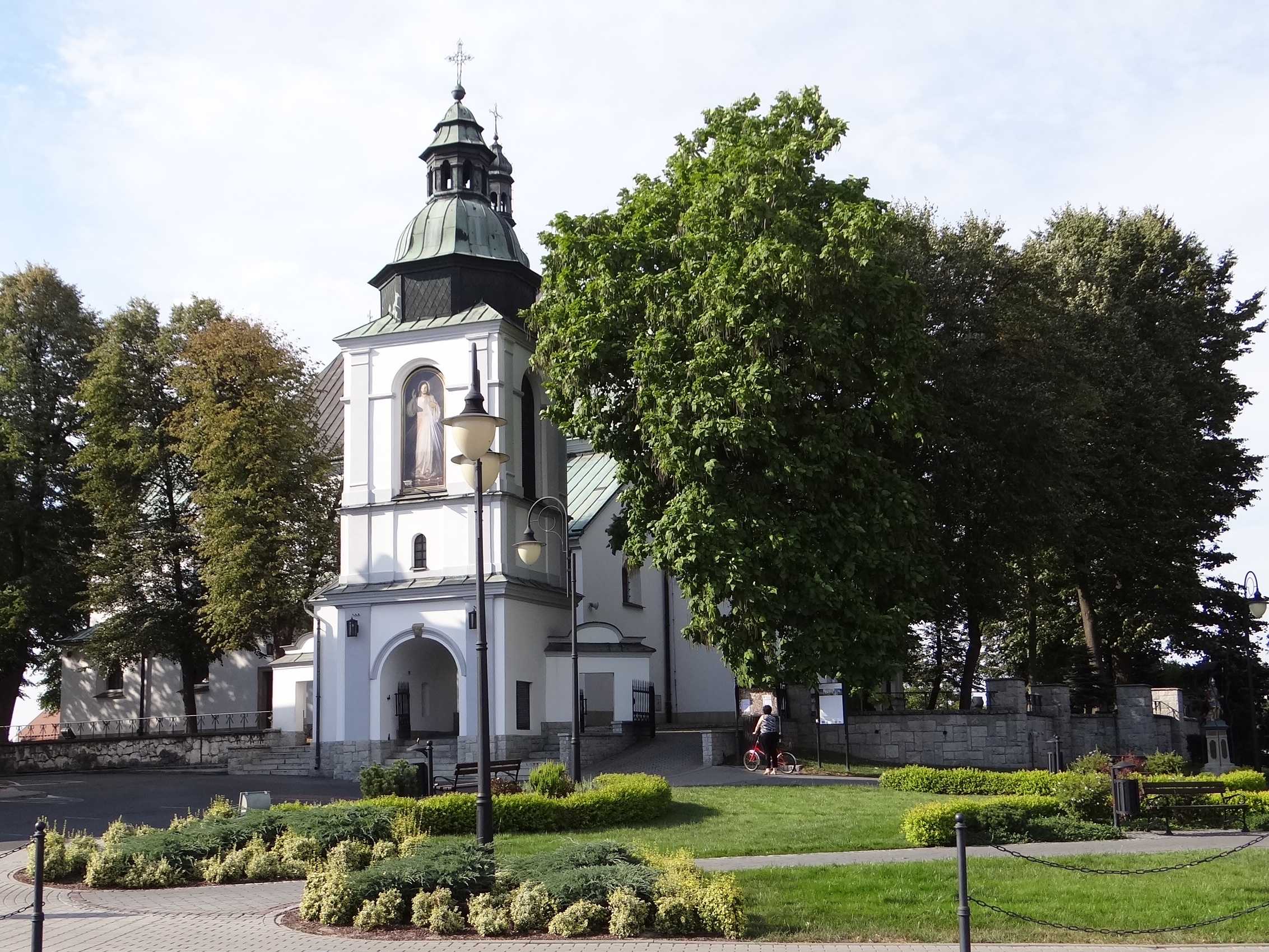
Church of the Holy Spirit

By the 15th century there were two churches at Żabno, the Church of the Holy Spirit and the Church of the Holy Cross. At the same time, first artisans opened their workshops here. Every week markets took place at Żabno, with the first one organized in the year 1487, after the town had received a royal privilege. The tradition of the markets still remains. The town was destroyed numerous times, in 1501 it was burned by the Tatars, and in 1656, it was completely destroyed in the Swedish invasion of Poland, when Transilvanian-Cossack army of George II Rakoczi, which was allied with the Swedish Empire, burned it to the ground. In 1772, after the first partition of Poland, Żabno became part of the Habsburg (Austrian) crown land of Galicia and Lodomeria, where it remained until late 1918. In 1799, a great fire burned almost all of the town.

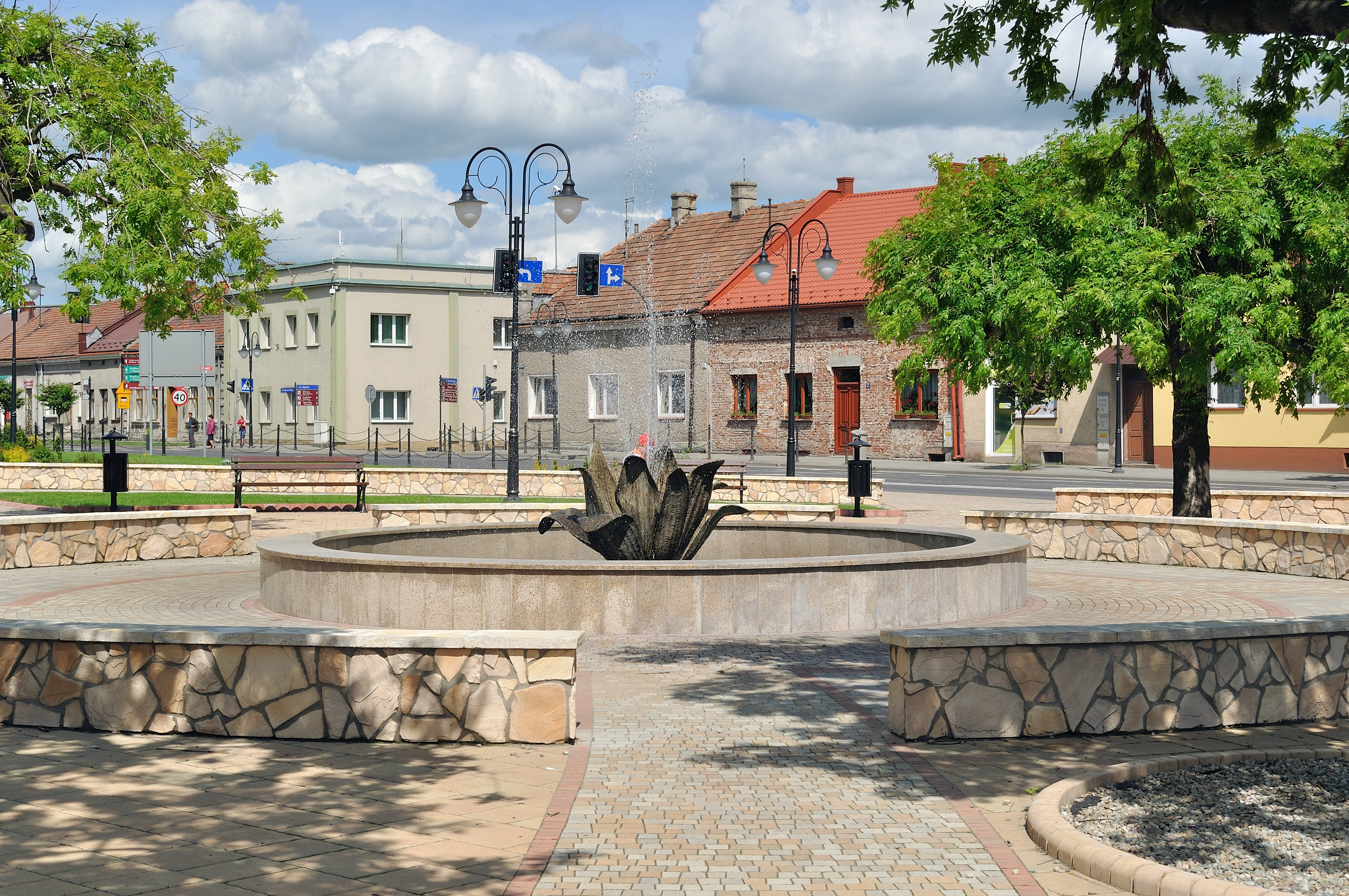
Market square

In the 19th century Żabno remained a small town, which in 1906 received a rail connection with Tarnów, due to a secondary-importance line from Tarnów to Szczucin. First local industrial facility was a brick making factory which opened in 1905. In the early 20th century the town began a slow process of development, which was stopped by World War I, when the frontline for several months remained along the Dunajec river, which brought widespread destruction. In the Second Polish Republic, Żabno belonged to Kraków Voivodeship. The town suffered greatly in the 1934 flood in Poland.

During World War II it was occupied by Germany and around 2,000 people were sent to a work in labor camps in Germany. 30 people were sent to a concentration camp during the war out of which only 4 returned. Żabno's Jewish community perished in the Holocaust.

From 1975 to 1998, it was administratively located in the Tarnów Voivodeship.

== Modern Żabno ==
The Census on December 31, 2006, gave the population as 4262 inhabitants. Currently Żabno is a town with a small-scale industrial capacity. Local industry mainly consists of metalworks and window manufacturing. The Tarnów-Szczucin railway runs through the town, as does a provincial road, No. 973, to Tarnów. Żabno is home to a sports club Polan.

== International relations ==
=== Twin towns — Sister cities ===
Żabno is twinned with:

- Bad Berka, Germany
