= Tarnów County =

Tarnów County Powiat tarnowski
- County
- Flag Coat of arms

- Location within the voivodeship
- Coordinates (Tarnów): 50°2′N 21°0′E
- Country: Poland
- Voivodeship: Lesser Poland
- Seat: Tarnów
- Gminas: Total 16: Gmina Ciężkowice; Gmina Gromnik; Gmina Lisia Góra; Gmina Pleśna; Gmina Radłów; Gmina Ryglice; Gmina Rzepiennik Strzyżewski; Gmina Skrzyszów; Gmina Szerzyny; Gmina Tarnów; Gmina Tuchów; Gmina Wierzchosławice; Gmina Wietrzychowice; Gmina Wojnicz; Gmina Żabno; Gmina Zakliczyn

Area
  - Total: 1,413.44 km^{2} (545.73 sq mi)

Population (2006)
  - Total: 193,549
  - Density: 136.935/km^{2} (354.659/sq mi)
  - Urban: 17,490
  - Rural: 176,059
- Car plates: KTA
- Website: www.powiat.tarnow.pl

Tarnów County (Polish: powiat tarnowski) is a unit of territorial administration and local government (powiat) in Lesser Poland Voivodeship, southern Poland. It came into being on January 1, 1999, as a result of the Polish local government reforms passed in 1998. Its administrative seat is the city of Tarnów, although the city is not part of the county (it constitutes a separate city county). The county contains seven towns: Tuchów, 16 km (10 mi) south of Tarnów, Żabno, 14 km (9 mi) north-west of Tarnów, Wojnicz, 15 km (9 mi) south-west of Tarnów, Radłów, 13 km (8 mi) north-west of Tarnów, Ryglice, 20 km (12 mi) south-east of Tarnów, Ciężkowice, 26 km (16 mi) south of Tarnów, and Zakliczyn, 25 km (16 mi) south-west of Tarnów.

The county covers an area of 1,413.44 square kilometres (545.7 sq mi). As of 2006 its total population was 193,549, out of which the population of Tuchów was 6,501, that of Żabno 4,271, that of Wojnicz 3,404, that of Ryglice 2,784, that of Ciężkowice 2,378, that of Zakliczyn 1,556, and the rural population was 176,059 (including approximately 2,800 for the population of Radłów, which became a town in 2010).

== Neighbouring counties ==
Apart from the city of Tarnów, Tarnów County is also bordered by Dąbrowa County to the north, Dębica County to the east, Jasło County to the south-east, Gorlice County and Nowy Sącz County to the south, Brzesko County and Proszowice County to the west, and Kazimierza County to the north-west.

== Administrative division ==
The county is subdivided into 16 gminas (seven urban-rural and nine rural). These are listed in the following table, in descending order of population.

Gmina	Type	Area (km^{2})	Population (2006)	Seat
Gmina Tarnów	rural	82.8	23,060	Tarnów *
Gmina Żabno	urban-rural	104.8	18,846	Żabno
Gmina Tuchów	urban-rural	100.1	17,654	Tuchów
Gmina Lisia Góra	rural	105.4	13,714	Lisia Góra
Gmina Skrzyszów	rural	86.2	13,022	Skrzyszów
Gmina Wojnicz	urban-rural	78.6	13,019	Wojnicz
Gmina Zakliczyn	urban-rural	122.6	12,242	Zakliczyn
Gmina Pleśna	rural	83.7	11,518	Pleśna
Gmina Ryglice	urban-rural	116.8	11,438	Ryglice
Gmina Ciężkowice	urban-rural	103.2	11,050	Ciężkowice
Gmina Wierzchosławice	rural	74.8	10,628	Wierzchosławice
Gmina Radłów	urban-rural	86.0	9,774	Radłów
Gmina Gromnik	rural	69.8	8,348	Gromnik
Gmina Szerzyny	rural	82.2	8,211	Szerzyny
Gmina Rzepiennik Strzyżewski	rural	70.2	6,832	Rzepiennik Strzyżewski
Gmina Wietrzychowice	rural	48.6	4,193	Wietrzychowice
* seat not part of the gmina
