= Ruda Kameralna =

- Village
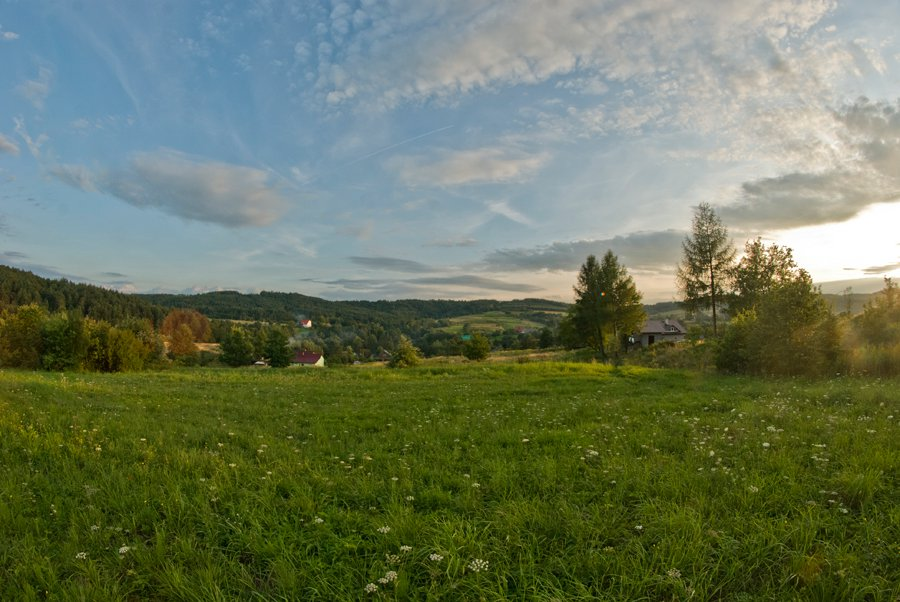
- Nickname: The Positively Twisted Village Polish: wioska pozytywnie zakręcona
- Location within Poland
- Coordinates: 49°49′N 20°45′E
- Country: Poland
- Voivodeship: Lesser Poland
- County: Tarnów
- Gmina: Zakliczyn
- Founded: 1372
- Founder: Brothers Błażej and Filip from Tworkowa

Government
  - Mayor: Teresa Kaczor

Area
  - Total: 6.5 km^{2} (2.5 sq mi)
- Elevation: 313 m (1,027 ft)

Population (2016)
  - Total: 294
  - Density: 45/km^{2} (120/sq mi)
- Time zone: UTC+1 (CET)
  - Summer (DST): UTC+2 (CEST)
- Postal code: 32-840
- Area code: (+48) 14

Ruda Kameralna [ˈruda kamɛˈralna] is a village in the administrative district of Gmina Zakliczyn, within Tarnów County, Lesser Poland Voivodeship, in southern Poland. In the years 1975–1998 the administrative district belonged to the Tarnow Voivodship.

Ruda Kameralna is also a thematic village under the name: wioska pozytywnie zakręcona, roughly translated to "the positively twisted village" in reference to grinding corn for flour and butter churning activities of their tours. They also celebrate traditional folk holidays and rituals and the history of the village.

== Etymology ==
The village is most likely named after their leading industry, the mining of iron ore as ruda means "ore". Kalmerana or kameralnym, means "intimate/cozy", commonly translated to "chamber" and likely derives from how the village is situated among the forests in a very peaceful place far from civilization.

== History ==
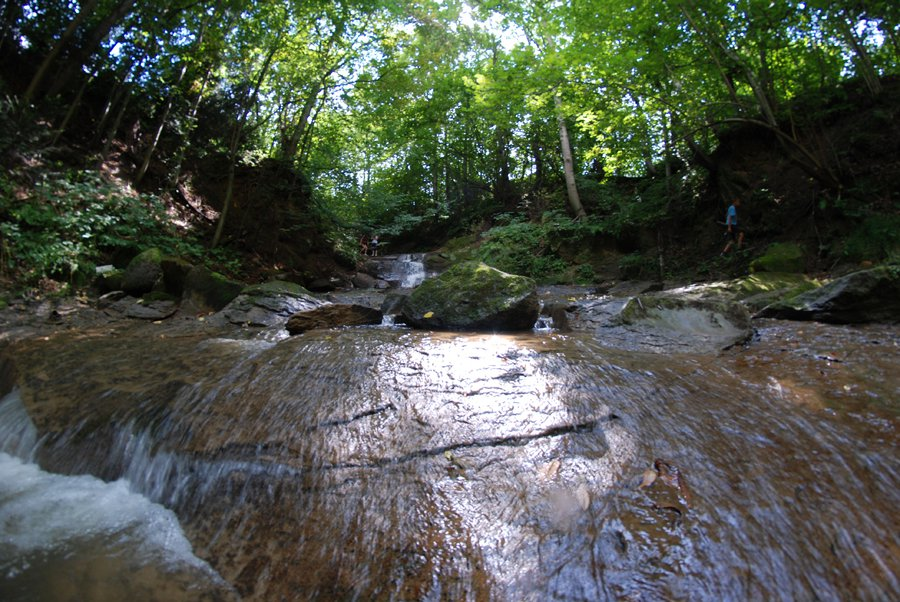
The Rudzianka, a stream that runs through the village

=== 14th century ===
In 1372, Paszko Tresta of Brzany, Gedcycze allowed the brothers Błażej and Filip from Tworkowa to establish the village of Ruda Kameralna south of Filipowice in the woods on the Świdnik Swamp.

Iron ore deposits were found in the area and exploited on a large scale in the Middle Ages. The ore was melted in cooking mugs and inverted in nearby Paleśnica. Salmon from the nearby stream was smoked and chopped and the water was used in the hammer mill to refine the iron they mined.

=== 17th century ===
In 1655, Sweden invaded Poland in the Deluge and Ruda Kameralna remained under Swedish rule until 1660 after the Polish King John II Casimir renounced his claim to the Swedish crown.

=== 18th century ===
In 1772, the village came under Austria-Hungarian rule and was considered part of historic Galicia. Although a village comprised completely of Poles, it was to remain part of Austria until the end of World War I. By 1795 Poland was no longer an independent Polish state and was partitioned between Brandenburg-Prussia, the Habsburg monarchy and Russia.

=== 20th century ===
In the aftermath of World War I, the Polish people rose up in the Greater Poland Uprising on December 27, 1918. The fighting continued until June 28, 1919, when the Treaty of Versailles was signed and the village became part of the new Republic of Poland with the rest of West Galicia.

In 1939, Germany and the USSR invaded Poland and the country was again partitioned between the two nations. The town of Ruda Kameralna became part of Germany with its residents deprived of their voting rights and banned from non-Nazi political parties. They would remain under Germany rule until the end of World War II in 1945 when Poland once again was its own independent nation.

In 1971 a fire burned down the brick and mortar St. Mary Trinity Chapel. It was rebuilt the same year.

=== 21st century ===
On July 23, 2001, there was flooding after torrential rains. The Rudzanka, a stream running through the village, turned into a great mass of brownish water that destroyed roads, houses, and farm buildings and forced the evacuation of the population.

== Geography ==
=== Topography ===
According to the Statute of the Village of Ruda Kameralna, the village has a total area of 685.49 hectares (1,693.9 acres) or 6.85 square kilometres (2.64 mi^{2}). Ruda Kameralna lies on the Rudzianka, a stream that flows down the mountains from the small village of Dzierżaniny in the south, to the Dunajec River in the north.

== Demographics ==
Historical population
Year	Pop.	±%
1869	573	—
1880	595	+3.8%
1890	696	+17.0%
1900	719	+3.3%
2009	323	−55.1%
2016	294	−9.0%
Source: 1869-1900 Austrian Census of Galacia, TERYT, and Zakliczyn.pl

=== 2016 ===
There were 294 inhabitants within 6.5 square kilometres (2.5 mi^{2}) for a population density of 45 inhabitants per square kilometre (116.5/sq mi).

=== 2009 ===
There were 323 inhabitants within 6.5 square kilometres (2.5 mi^{2}) for a population density of 50 inhabitants per square kilometre (129.5/sq mi).

=== 1900 Austrian Census ===
As per 1900 Austrian Census of Galicia, there were 719 people in 126 houses residing in the village with an area of 650 hectares (1,600 acres). The population density was 111 inhabitants per square kilometre (287.5/sq mi). There were an average of 5.7 inhabitants per home. The gender makeup of the town was 51% male and 49% female.

The ordinary language of the population was Polish and they had one elementary school.

=== 1890 Austrian Census ===
As per 1890 Austrian Census of Galicia, there were 696 people in 112 houses residing in the village with an area of 6.5 square kilometres (2.5 mi^{2}). The population density was 107 inhabitants per square kilometre (277.1/sq mi). There were an average of 6.2 inhabitants per home. The gender makeup of the town was 51.1% male and 48.9% female.

=== 1880 Austrian Census ===
As per the 1880 Austrian Census of Galicia, there were 595 people in 116 houses residing in the village. The population density was 92 inhabitants per square kilometre (238.3/sq mi). There were an average of 5.1 inhabitants per home. The gender makeup of the town was 47.4% male and 52.6% female.

=== 1869 Austrian Census ===
As per the 1869 Austrian Census of Galicia, there were 573 people in 127 houses residing in the village. The population density was 88 inhabitants per square kilometre (227.9/sq mi). There was an average of 4.5 inhabitants per home. The gender makeup of the town was 46.2% male and 53.8% female.

== Places of interest ==
=== Great Southern Loop ===
The Great Southern Loop (Wielka Pętla Południowa) or the PTTK "green trail" is the longest biking rout in the community of Zakliczyn at 40 kilometres (25 mi) long. It runs from Czchów to Gromnik through Ruda Kameralna.

=== Chapel of the Virgin Mary ===
The St. Mary Trinity Chapel was built in 1864 as a brick and plastered stone object. In 1971 it was destroyed in a fire, but was rebuilt in the same year. Three altars made from 1971 to 1975 exist inside the chapel.

=== 19th century stone shrines ===
There are two 19th-century stone shrines in the village made from whitewashed stone-thrown clay. One is square with a gabled roof and a recessed niche featuring a folk sculpture of Christ crucified and paintings of the Family and Heart of St. Mary. The other is in the shape of a slender post with softened corners which is wider at the top than the bottom. In that top are recesses containing porcelain figurines of angels and the Immaculate Conception of Mary.

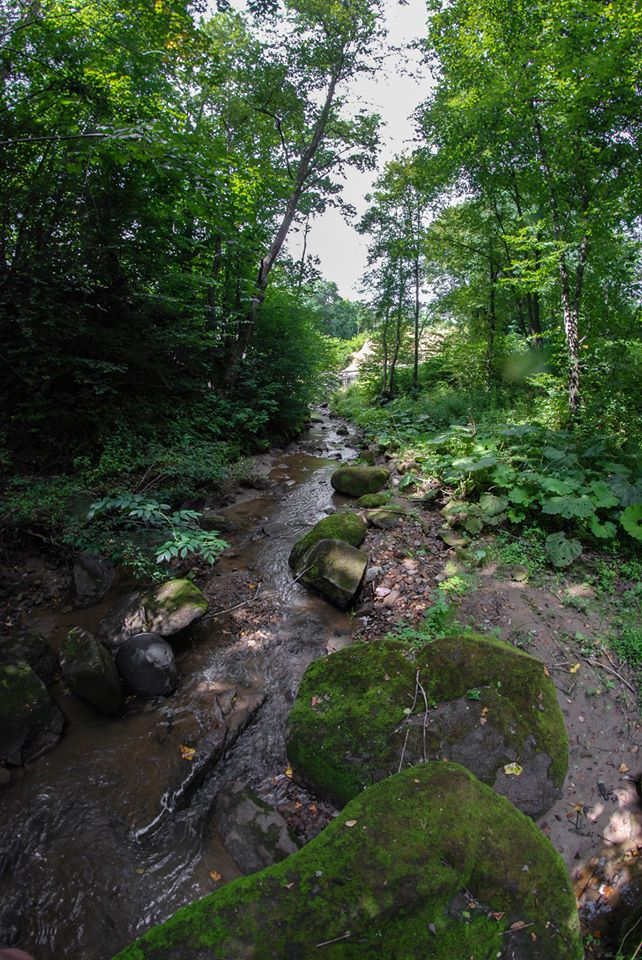
Forest stream

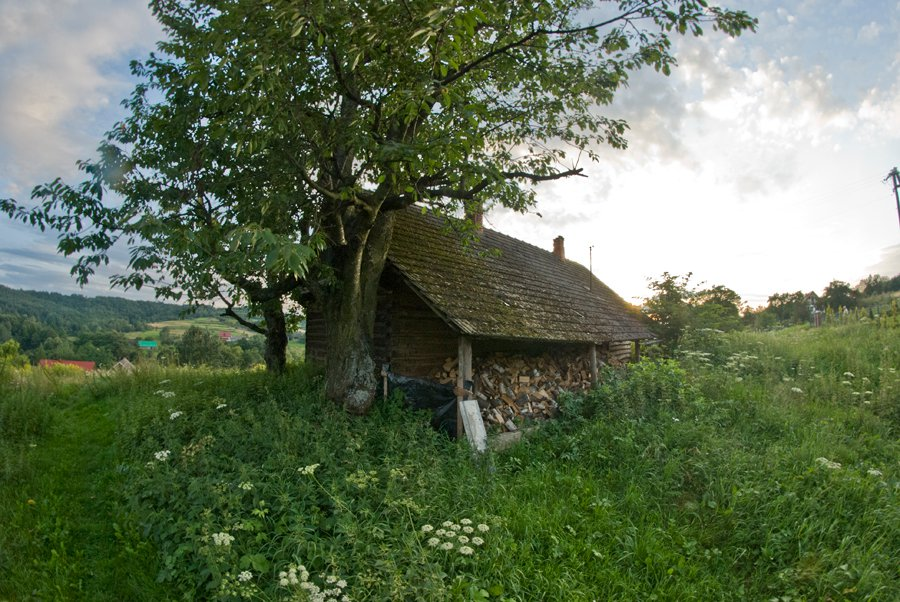
House in Ruda Kameralna

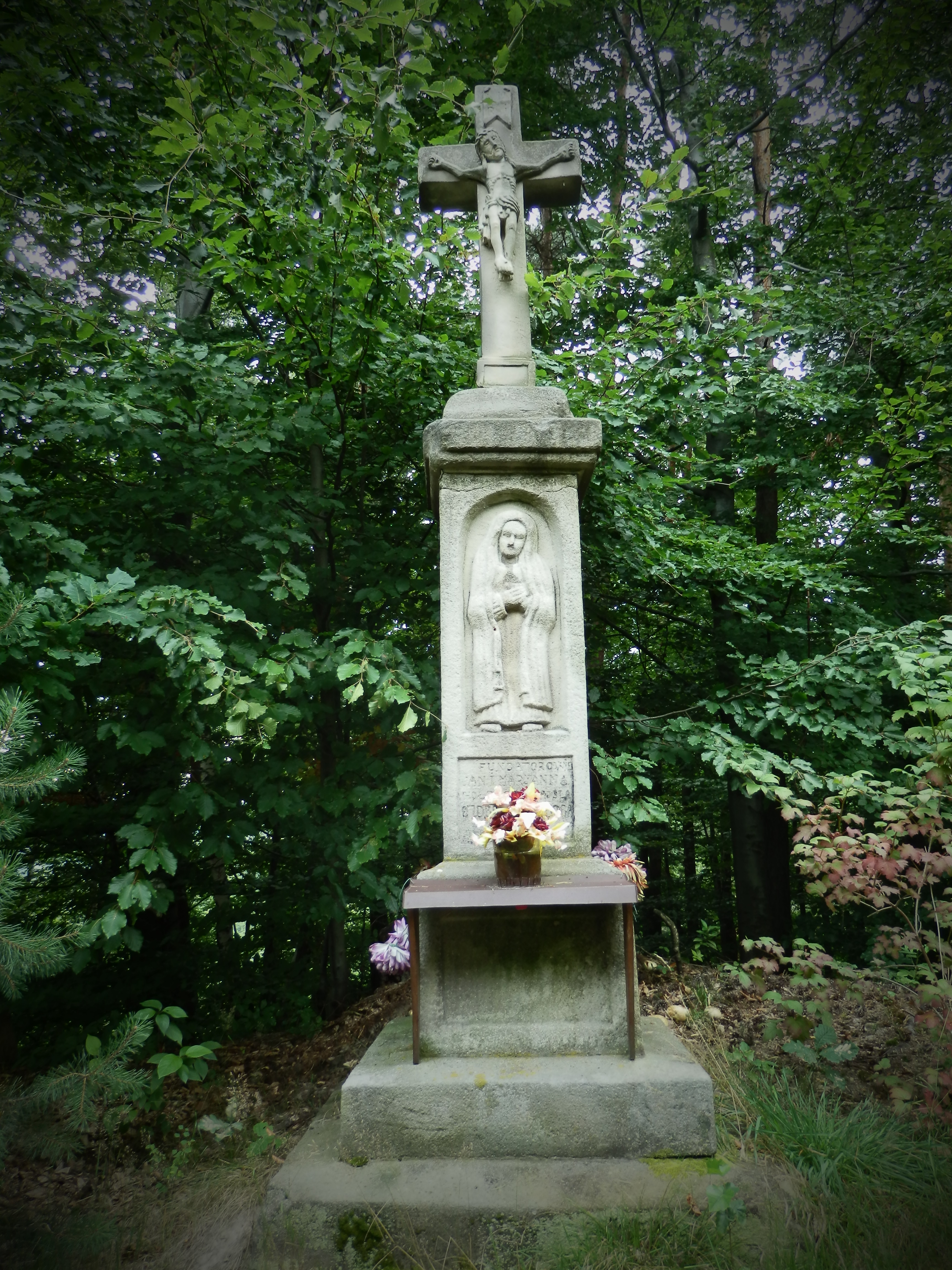
19th century stone shrine of Christ Crucified

== Notable people ==
- Captain Jan "Salwa" Dubaniowski - Commander of the Bochnia District of the Polish Armed Forces on September 27, 1947
- Józef Kumorek - son of Jan and Katarzyny, born July 17, 1883, in Ruda Kameralna, died in Tarnów prison on December 29, 1940, from heart problems. He was one of an estimated 25,000 prisoners of the Germans during their occupation of Tarnów in World War II.
- Stanisław Rozkocha - folk sculptor
- Anderzej Różowski - Previous mayor of Ruda Kameralna
