= Siemiechów, Lesser Poland Voivodeship =

Siemiechów
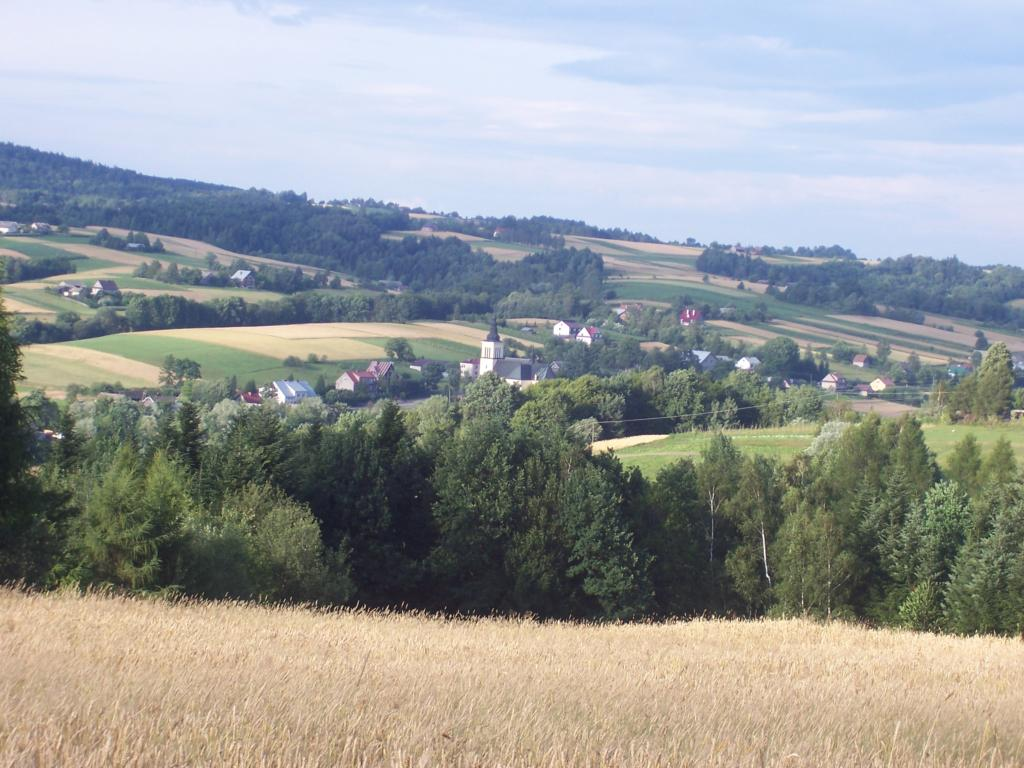
- View of village centre and the church

- Location within Poland
- Coordinates: 49°51′0″N 20°55′0″E
- Country: Poland
- Voivodeship: Lesser Poland
- County: Tarnów
- Gmina: Gromnik
- Village rights: September 29, 1326

Government
  - Village Leader (Sołtys): Waldemar Gądek

Population (2003)
  - Total: 1,873
- Time zone: UTC+1 (CET)
  - Summer (DST): UTC+2 (CEST)
- Postal code: 33-181
- Area code: +48 014
- Car plates: KT
- Website: http://www.jurasowka.pl/

Siemiechów [ɕɛˈmjɛxuf] is a village located in the low Carpathian Mountains of southeastern Poland in the Lesser Poland Voivodeship. The population in 2003 was 1,873.

== Location ==
Siemiechów, or Siemichów, is a village in the Wielicki Highlands situated between the Wału and the Suchy mountain ranges, in the county of Tarnów between Zakliczyn and Gromnik. Its elevation varies from 245 to 260 meters above sea level. Areas in the village are Wielkie Góry, Małe Góry, Łęg, Moszczenica and Wiesiołka. A greater area is shared by Siemiechów, Leśniczówkę and Dybówkę. The greater area consists of 579 morgs of fields, 6 morgs of meadows, 14 morgs of pastures and 511 morgs of forest, whereas the lesser area consists of 1,687 morgs of fields, 132 morgs of meadows, 310 morgs of pastures and 307 morgs of forests. To the west of the village is Faściszowa, to the east is Gromnik, to the south is Brzozowa, and to the north, past a large beech forest, is Lubinka.

== History ==
In 1241, invading Tatars, on their way to Tuchów (22 km (14 mi) north-east of Siemiechów), murdered seven monks ("siedem mnichów"). The name of the village is a derivation of this phrase. The village was officially founded under German law on 29 September 1326 by King Władysław Łokietek "na surowym korzeniu" ("from fresh roots" or "from the ground up").

A parish formed on "dwoma łanami ziemi" (2 łanow of land). According to Jan Długosz, in 1354, the village of Szemychów' parish belonged to the Abbey of Tyniec (near Kraków) by virtue of privilege of King Casimir III. Shortly before the Battle of Worskła in 1398, however, Spytek of Melsztyn seized the monastery.

In 1581, a 'sołtys' (a village administrator) who counted one wealthy farmer owning twenty-five 'łanow', ten small farms without fields, three bailiffs who owned cattle, eight bailiffs without cattle, four craftsmen, and the village administrator himself who owned 1 1/2 'łana' of land.

An eighteenth century resident of the town was Ignacy Krasiński. He was the third son of Jan (castellan of Wizna, near Łomza) and Ewa Trojanowska. He had two brothers, Adam, (a bishop) and Michał Hieronim Krasiński (the great-grandfather of Zygmunt Krasiński the poet). In 1770, the treasury recorded his ownership of three 'folwark' (granges). He paid an annual military tax of 1266 złoty and 17 groszy, and a winter military tax of 458 złoty and 12 groszy. Krasiński was governor of Siemiechów from 1776 to 1788. In 1772, the Krasiński estate was ransomed to the incumbent Austrian government. Ignacy paid the large ransom in 1789.

Krasiński's first wife was Maryanna Krasińska Jordanów. His second wife (married 1774) was Agnieszka Potkańska, castellan of Radom. Their daughter, Anna, married Kazimierz Walicki, governor of Sochaczew. In 1795, Kazimierz Walicki wrote an autobiography. Anna had a second marriage to Mikołaj of Oplów Bronikowski, a major general in the royal arms. Anna and Kazimierz Wlaicki's daughter, Amelia married a count named Roman Załuski.

=== Parish church ===
In the village there is a Gothic hand crafted wooden church, "Matki Boskiej Gromnicznej" ("The Virgin Mary of Candles") (1349). In 1585, the church was rebuilt with a donation from Jan of Mstowa. The church has one nave, and a closed, three sided presbytery. Adjacent to it, on its southern side, is a late Baroque brick chapel built in a square shape with rounded corners. The entrance has a Gothic carpenter's portal in a "oślimi grzbietami" (a curved arch style) which was added in 1800. The church interior features a flat ceiling and furnishings from the fifteenth to seventeenth centuries. There is a statue of the Virgin Mary (1480); a stone font bearing the coat of arms of Piława and Gierałt; and a fifteenth-century crucifix. There are also two large bells dating to the sixteenth century which were built in the workshop of Szymon Haubicz in Brno. The interior walls were painted by Łukasz Wadowski in 1643. From 1955 to 1956 the church underwent restoration.

From 1929 to 1953, a new brick parish church, "Ofiarowania Wszystkich Świętych i Wniebowstąpienia Pana Jezusa" ("Offering in the Temple and Ascension of Our Lord Jesus"), was constructed in the Neo-Renaissance style. There is also a brick chapel (1915) in the war cemetery. The parish belongs to the Tarnowski diocese and Tuchowski deanery.

== Resources ==
- Sulimierski, Filip (1890). Słownik Geograficzny Królestwo Polskiego i Innych Krajów Słowiańskich (in Polish). p. 543.
- Boniecki, Adam (1908). Herbarz Polski (in Polish). pp. 209–210.
- Kurii Diecezjalnej w Tarnowie, Nakładem (1967). Rocznik Diecezji Tarnowskiej (in Polish). p. 411.
- Kruczek, Zygmunt (1983). Województwo Tarnowski: Vademecum Turystyczne Tarnów (in Polish). p. 87.
- Krupiński, Andrzej B. (1989). Urbanistyki i Architektury-Województwa Tarnowskiego (in Polish). p. 54.
- Matuszczyk, Andrzej (1995). Pogórze Karpackie: Wielickie, Rożnowskie i Ciężkowickie (in Polish). p. 299.
