= Siemiechów =

Siemiechów may refer to the following places:

- Siemiechów, Lesser Poland Voivodeship (south Poland)
- Siemiechów, Łódź Voivodeship (central Poland)
