= Gwoździec =

Gwoździec may refer to the following places:

- Gwoździec, Lesser Poland Voivodeship, a village in southern Poland
- Gwoździec, Podkarpackie Voivodeship, a village in southeastern Poland
- Hvizdets, a town in western Ukraine
