= Wiesław Woda =

Polish politician

Deputy of the Sejm
- In office 1997 – 2010
- Succeeded by: Andrzej Sztorc
- Constituency: 15 Tarnów (after 2001); 46 Tarnów (until 2001)
- In office 1989 – 1991
- Constituency: 48 Kraków-Śródmieście

Personal details
- Born: 17 August 1946 Paleśnica, Poland
- Died: 10 April 2010 (aged 63) near Smolensk, Russia
- Party: Polish People's Party
- Other political affiliations: United People's Party (1989)

Wiesław Woda (17 August 1946 – 10 April 2010) was a Polish politician.

== Early life ==
Woda was born in Paleśnica.

== Career ==
He was elected to the Sejm on 25 September 2005, getting 8,818 votes in 15 Tarnów district as a candidate for Polish People's Party.

He was also a member of People's Republic of Poland Sejm 1989-1991, Sejm 1997-2001, Sejm 2001-2005 and Sejm 2007-2011.

== Death ==
He was listed on the flight manifest of the Tupolev Tu-154 of the 36th Special Aviation Regiment carrying the President of Poland Lech Kaczyński which crashed near Smolensk-North airport near Pechersk near Smolensk, Russia, on 10 April 2010, killing all aboard.

His funeral took place on 25 April 2010. There was a Mass at St Mary's Church in Kraków, concelebrated by Cardinal Stanislaw Dziwisz. Wieslaw Woda was buried in the Alley of the Meritorious in Rakowicki Cemetery in Kraków next to Adam Studziński.

== Honours ==
On 16 April 2010, Woda was posthumously awarded the Commander's Cross of the Order of Polonia Restituta.

== See also ==
- Members of Polish Sejm 2005-2007
