= Wróblowice =

Wróblowice may refer to the following places in Poland:

- Wróblowice, Lower Silesian Voivodeship (south-west Poland)
- Wróblowice, Lesser Poland Voivodeship (south Poland)
- Wróblowice, part of the Swoszowice district of Kraków
