= Brzozowa, Lesser Poland Voivodeship =

Brzozowa
- Village
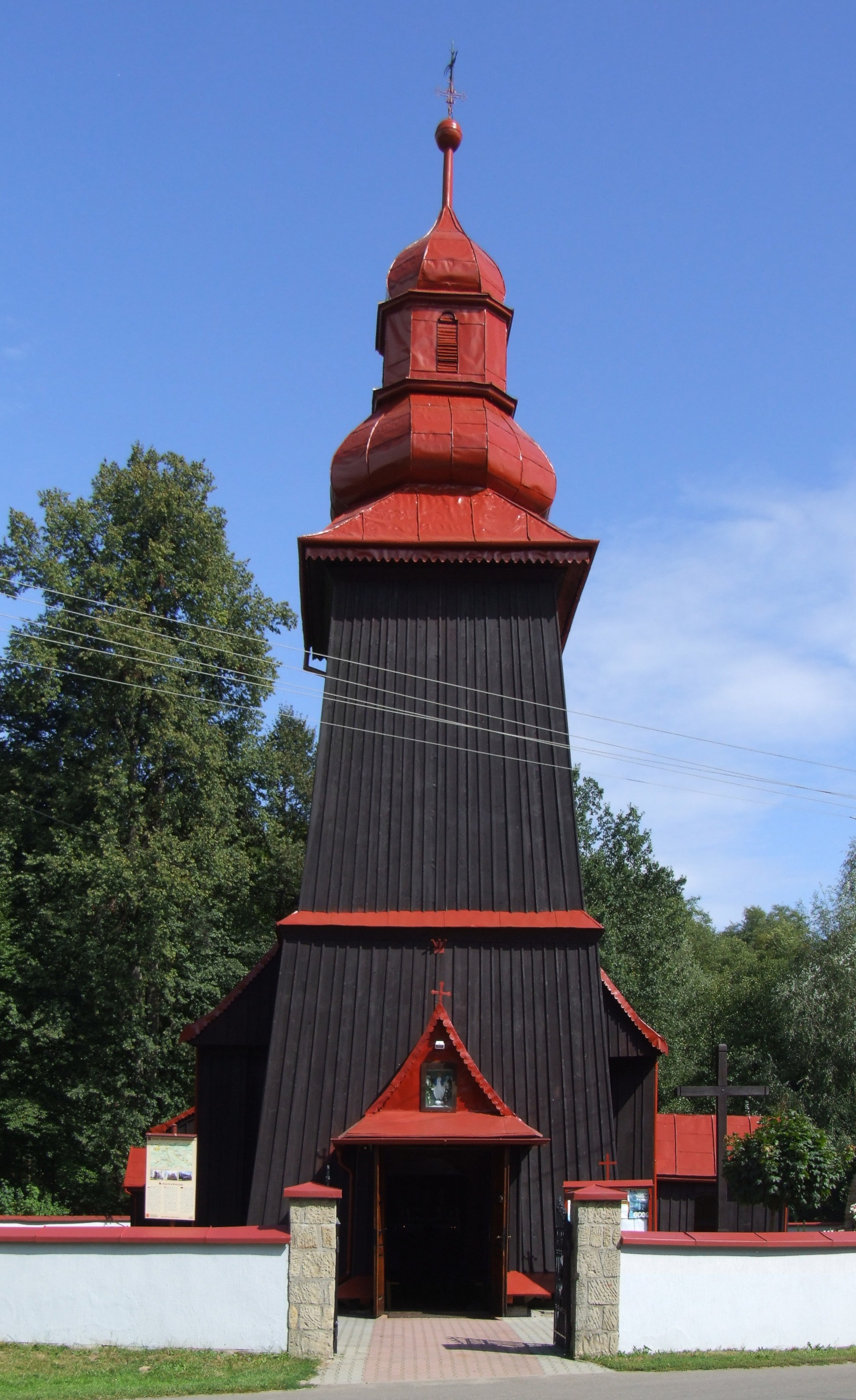
- Wooden church in Brzozowa

- Location within Poland
- Coordinates: 49°50′N 20°52′E
- Country: Poland
- Voivodeship: Lesser Poland
- County: Tarnów
- Gmina: Gromnik
- Population: 743
- Website: https://web.archive.org/web/20071114021236/http://www.wiesbrzozowa.republika.pl/

Brzozowa [bʐɔˈzɔva] is a village in the administrative district of Gmina Gromnik, within Tarnów County, Lesser Poland Voivodeship, in southern Poland. The village is located in the Ciężkowice-Rożnów Landscape Park.

The sixteenth century St. Nicholas Church in Brzozowa is located in the village. It has been renovated multiple times: in 1665–78, in 1835–50, in 1960, and during the 1990s. In 2008, the church was entered into the Wooden Architecture Trail.
