= Stróże, Tarnów County =

Stróże
- Village
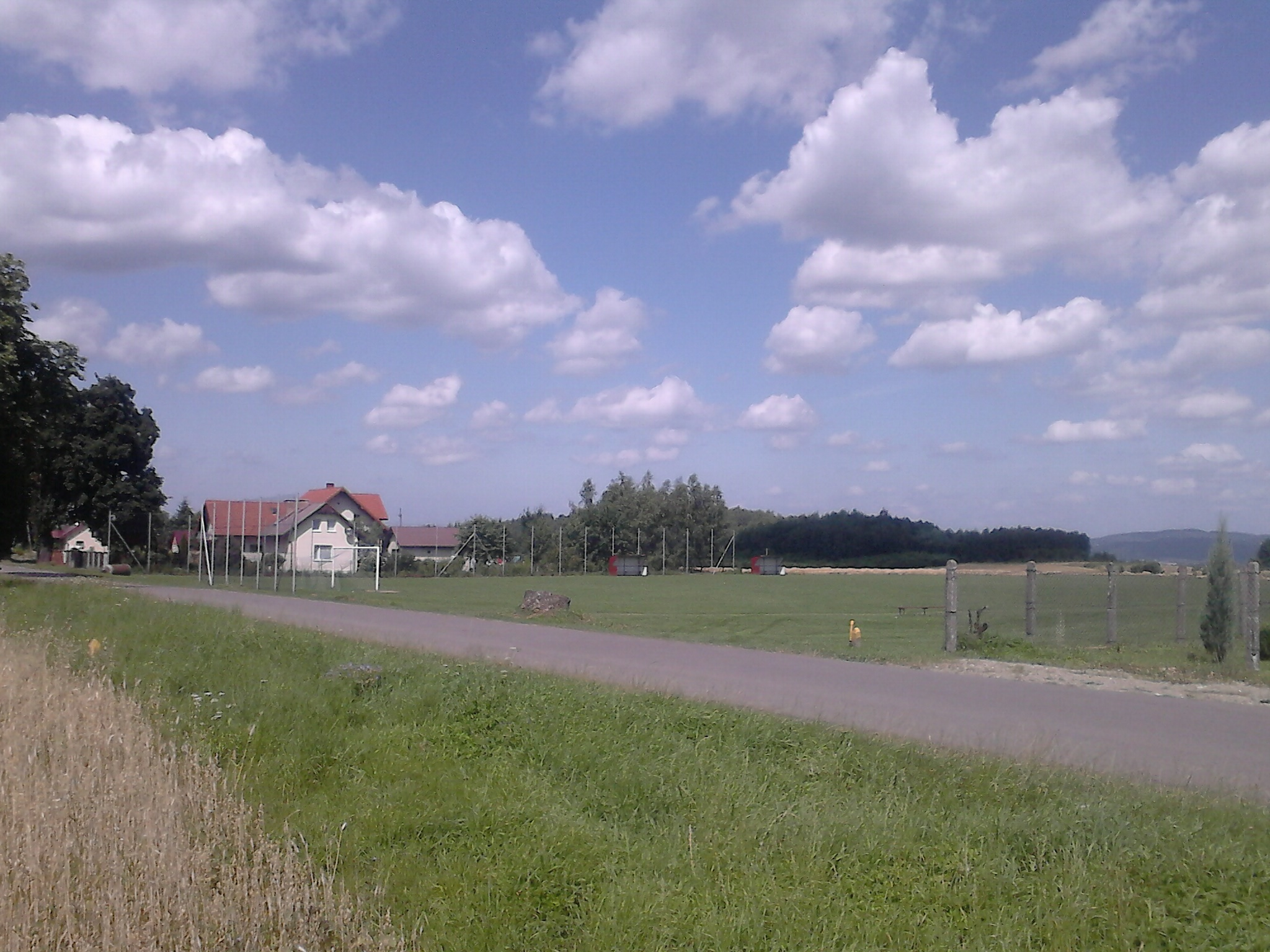

- Location within Poland
- Coordinates: 49°50′0″N 20°45′0″E
- Country: Poland
- Voivodeship: Lesser Poland
- County: Tarnów
- Gmina: Zakliczyn
- Population: 630
- Website: http://www.zakliczyn.com/wioski/stroze.php

Stróże [ˈstruʐɛ] is a village in the administrative district of Gmina Zakliczyn, within Tarnów County, Lesser Poland Voivodeship, in southern Poland.
