= Faliszewice, Lesser Poland Voivodeship =

Faliszewice
- Village
- Location within Poland
- Coordinates: 49°51′N 20°44′E
- Country: Poland
- Voivodeship: Lesser Poland
- County: Tarnów
- Gmina: Zakliczyn
- Website: http://www.zakliczyn.com/wioski/faliszewice.php

Faliszewice [faliʂɔˈvit͡sɛ] is a village in the administrative district of Gmina Zakliczyn, within Tarnów County, Lesser Poland Voivodeship, in southern Poland.
