= Bieśnik, Tarnów County =

Bieśnik
- Village
- Location within Poland
- Coordinates: 49°49′N 20°48′E
- Country: Poland
- Voivodeship: Lesser Poland
- County: Tarnów
- Gmina: Zakliczyn
- Website: http://www.zakliczyn.com/wioski/biesnik.php

Bieśnik [ˈbjɛɕnik] is a village in the administrative district of Gmina Zakliczyn, within Tarnów County, Lesser Poland Voivodeship, in southern Poland.
