= Jamna, Lesser Poland Voivodeship =

Jamna
- Village
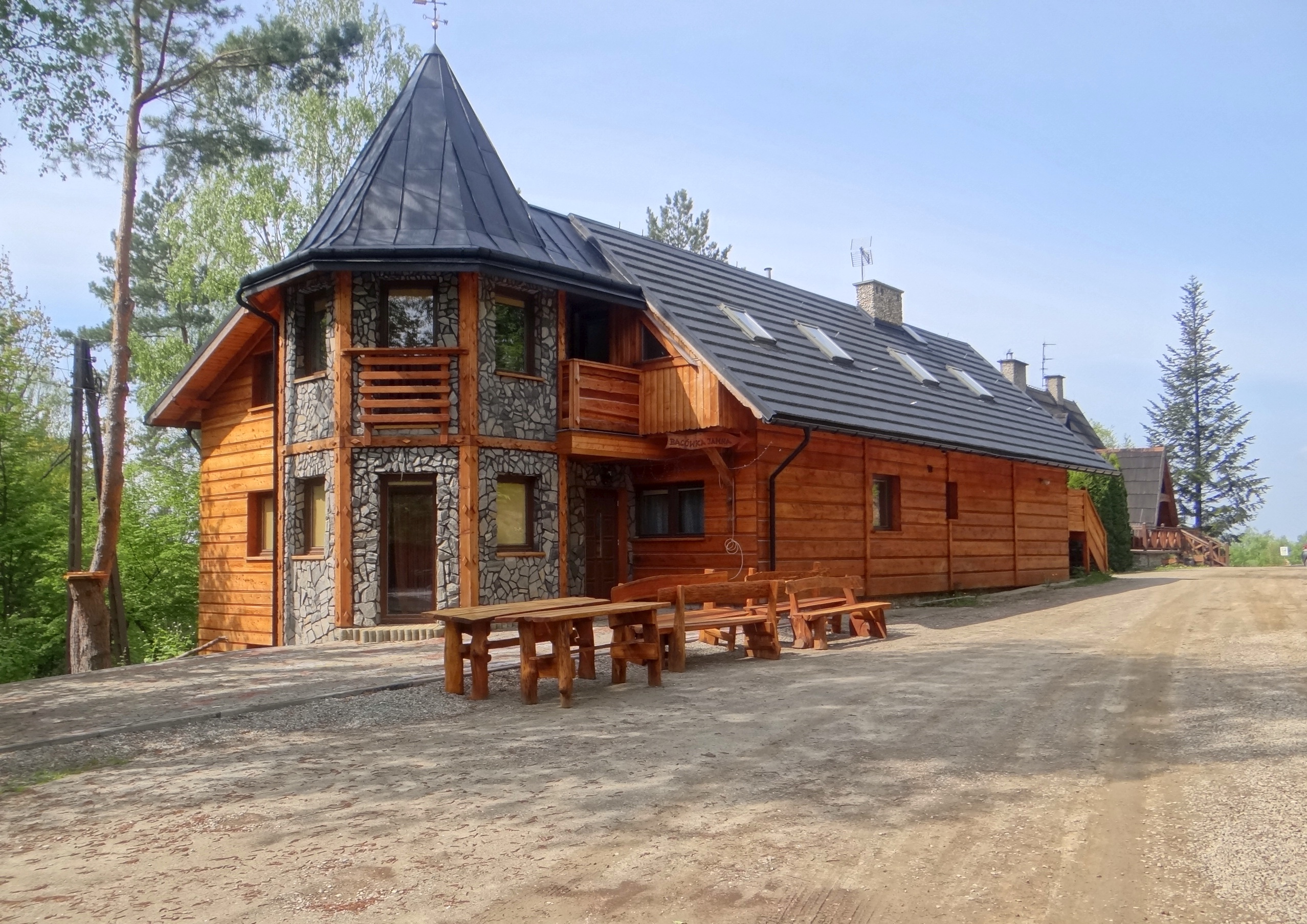

- Location within Poland
- Coordinates: 49°46′N 20°50′E
- Country: Poland
- Voivodeship: Lesser Poland
- County: Tarnów
- Gmina: Zakliczyn
- Time zone: UTC+1 (CET)
  - Summer (DST): UTC+2 (CEST)
- Vehicle registration: KTA
- Website: http://www.zakliczyn.com/wioski/jamna.php

Jamna [ˈjamna] is a village in the administrative district of Gmina Zakliczyn, within Tarnów County, Lesser Poland Voivodeship, in southern Poland.

== History ==
Following the German-Soviet invasion of Poland, which started World War II in September 1939, the village was occupied by Germany until 1945. On 25 September 1944, Jamna was the site of one of the largest battles between Polish partisans and German occupiers. In the Battle of Jamna, Polish partisans of the Home Army together with Azeris who had deserted from a German collaborationist unit, numbering over 600 men, clashed with numerically superior German forces and the Ukrainian 14th Waffen Grenadier Division of the SS. The Poles managed to break out of the encirclement and escape the Germans and Ukrainians, losing three soldiers, whilst the Azeris fled in the early stages of the battle. In retaliation, on 26 September 1944, the Germans pacified the village, massacring 23 of its inhabitants.
