= Gmina Zakliczyn =

Gmina Zakliczyn Zakliczyn Commune
- Gmina
- Flag Coat of arms
- Interactive map of Gmina Zakliczyn
- Coordinates (Zakliczyn): 49°51′N 20°49′E
- Country: Poland
- Voivodeship: Lesser Poland
- County: Tarnów County
- Seat: Zakliczyn

Area
  - Total: 122.55 km^{2} (47.32 sq mi)

Population (2006)
  - Total: 12,242
  - Density: 99.894/km^{2} (258.72/sq mi)
  - Urban: 1,556
  - Rural: 10,686
- Website: http://www.zakliczyn.pl

Gmina Zakliczyn is an urban-rural gmina (administrative district) in Tarnów County, Lesser Poland Voivodeship, in southern Poland. Its seat is the town of Zakliczyn, which lies approximately 25 kilometres (16 mi) south-west of Tarnów and 68 km (42 mi) east of the regional capital Kraków.

The gmina covers an area of 122.55 square kilometres (47.3 sq mi), and as of 2006 its total population is 12,242 (out of which the population of Zakliczyn amounts to 1,556, and the population of the rural part of the gmina is 10,686).

The gmina contains part of the protected area called Ciężkowice-Rożnów Landscape Park.

== Villages ==
Apart from the town of Zakliczyn, Gmina Zakliczyn contains the villages and settlements of Bieśnik, Borowa, Charzewice, Dzierżaniny, Faliszowice, Faściszowa, Filipowice, Gwoździec, Jamna, Kończyska, Lusławice, Melsztyn, Olszowa, Paleśnica, Roztoka, Ruda Kameralna, Słona, Stróże, Wesołów, Wola Stróska, Wróblowice, Zawada Lanckorońska and Zdonia.

== Neighbouring gminas ==
Gmina Zakliczyn is bordered by the gminas of Ciężkowice, Czchów, Dębno, Gródek nad Dunajcem, Gromnik, Korzenna, Pleśna and Wojnicz.
