= Zdonia =

- Village
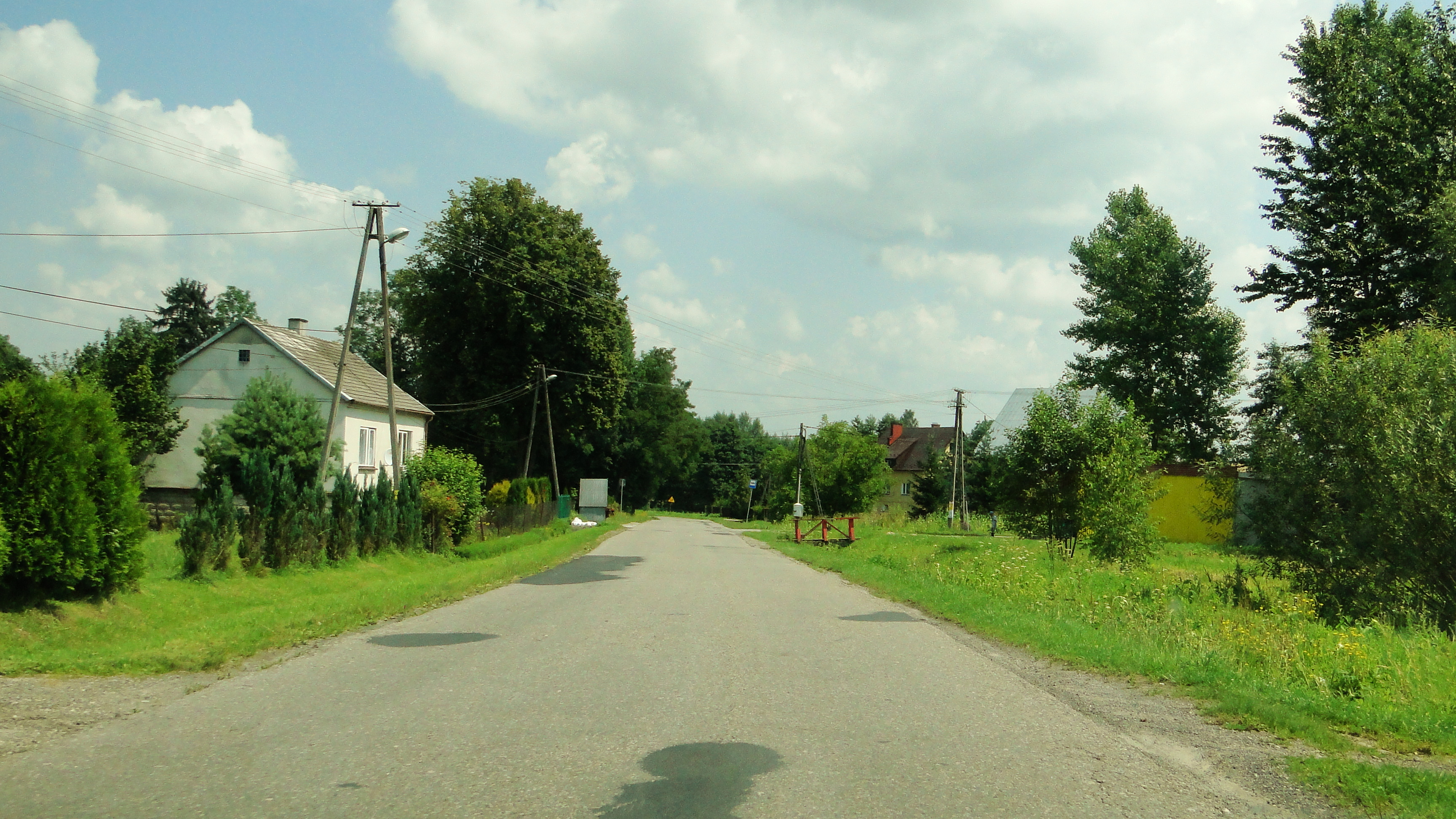

- Location within Poland
- Coordinates: 49°51′N 20°48′E
- Country: Poland
- Voivodeship: Lesser Poland
- County: Tarnów
- Gmina: Zakliczyn
- Website: http://www.zakliczyn.com/wioski/zdonia.php

Zdonia [ˈzdɔɲa] is a village located in the administrative district of Gmina Zakliczyn, within Tarnów County, Lesser Poland Voivodeship, in southern Poland.
