= Zawada Lanckorońska =

- Village
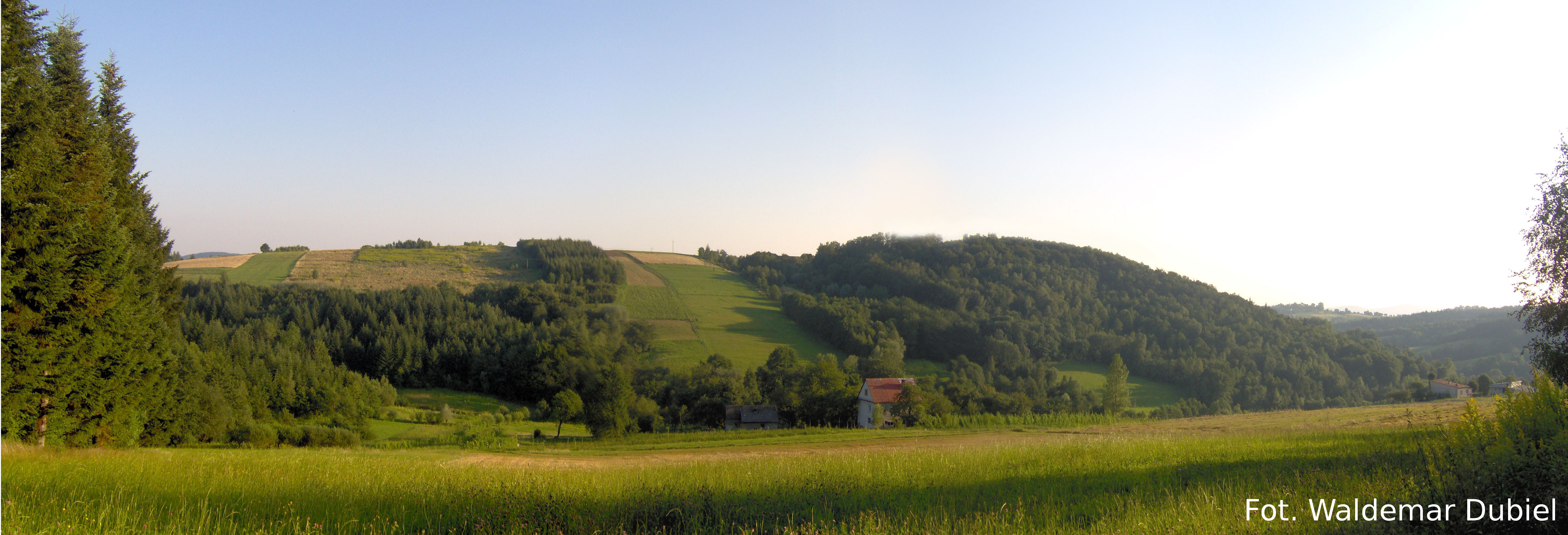

- Location within Poland
- Coordinates: 49°53′N 20°47′E
- Country: Poland
- Voivodeship: Lesser Poland
- County: Tarnów
- Gmina: Zakliczyn

Zawada Lanckorońska [zaˈvada lant͡skɔˈrɔɲska] is a village in the administrative district of Gmina Zakliczyn, within Tarnów County, Lesser Poland Voivodeship, in southern Poland.
