= Gmina Gromnik =

Gmina Gromnik Gromnik Commune
- Gmina
- Flag Coat of arms
- Interactive map of Gmina Gromnik
- Coordinates (Gromnik): 49°50′N 20°57′E
- Country: Poland
- Voivodeship: Lesser Poland
- County: Tarnów County
- Seat: Gromnik

Area
  - Total: 69.81 km^{2} (26.95 sq mi)

Population (2006)
  - Total: 8,348
  - Density: 119.6/km^{2} (309.7/sq mi)
- Website: https://www.gromnik.pl/

Gmina Gromnik is a rural gmina (administrative district) in Tarnów County, Lesser Poland Voivodeship, in southern Poland. Its seat is the village of Gromnik, which lies approximately 23 kilometres (14 mi) south of Tarnów and 77 km (48 mi) east of the regional capital Kraków.

The gmina covers an area of 69.81 square kilometres (27.0 sq mi), and as of 2006 its total population is 8,348.

The gmina contains part of the protected area called Ciężkowice-Rożnów Landscape Park.

== Villages ==
Gmina Gromnik contains the villages and settlements of Brzozowa, Chojnik, Golanka, Gromnik, Polichty, Rzepiennik Marciszewski and Siemiechów.

== Neighbouring gminas ==
Gmina Gromnik is bordered by the gminas of Ciężkowice, Pleśna, Rzepiennik Strzyżewski, Tuchów and Zakliczyn.
