= Polichty =

- Village
- Location within Poland
- Coordinates: 49°49′N 20°54′E
- Country: Poland
- Voivodeship: Lesser Poland
- County: Tarnów
- Gmina: Gromnik
- Population: 295

Polichty [pɔˈlixtɨ] is a village in the administrative district of Gmina Gromnik, within Tarnów County, Lesser Poland Voivodeship, in southern Poland.
