= Golanka, Lesser Poland Voivodeship =

Golanka
- Village
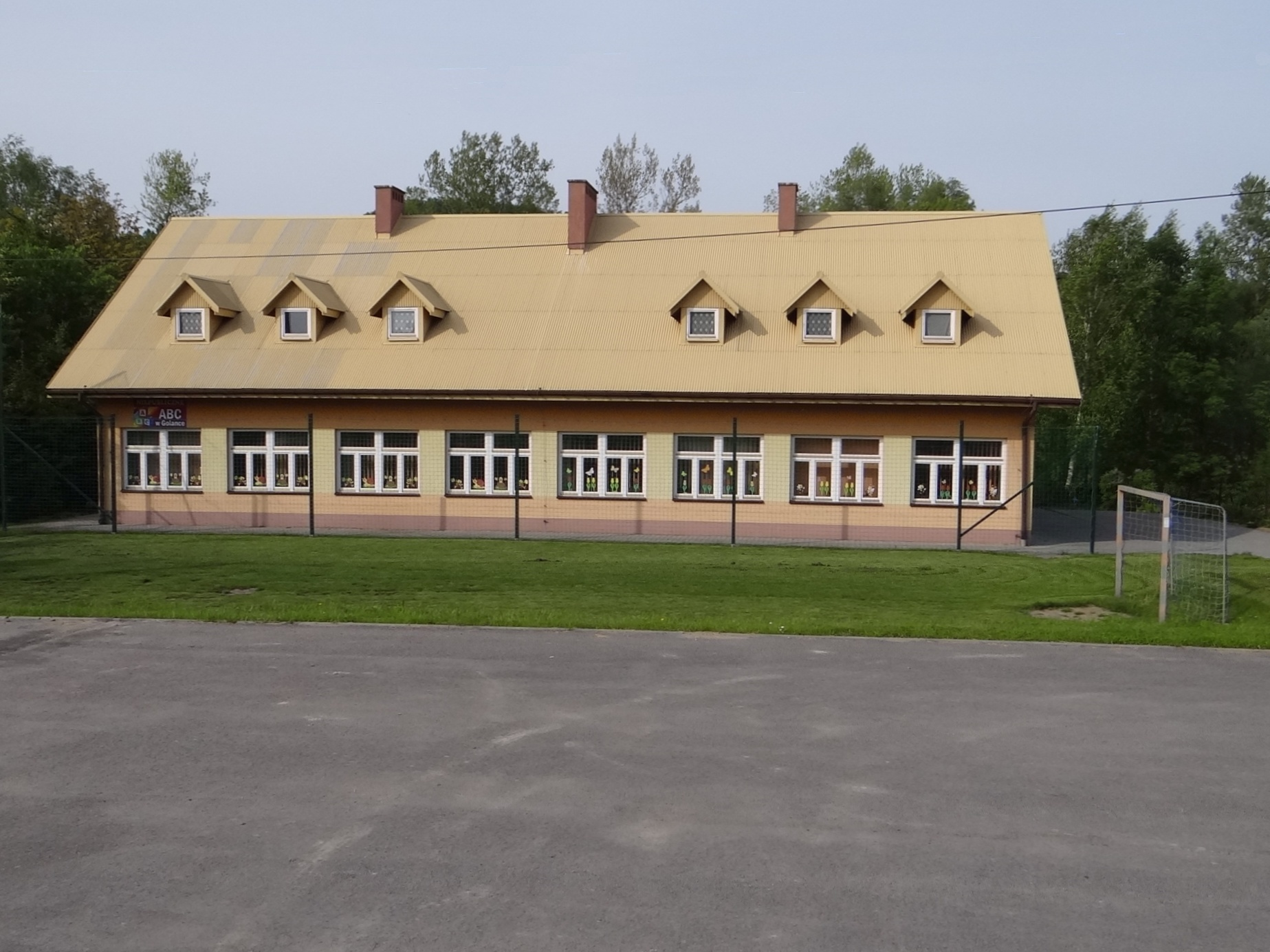

- Location within Poland
- Coordinates: 49°50′12″N 20°59′14″E
- Country: Poland
- Voivodeship: Lesser Poland
- County: Tarnów
- Gmina: Gromnik
- Population: 413

Golanka [ɡɔˈlanka] is a village in the administrative district of Gmina Gromnik, within Tarnów County, Lesser Poland Voivodeship, in southern Poland.
