= Borowa, Lesser Poland Voivodeship =

Borowa
- Village
- Location within Poland
- Coordinates: 49°48′N 20°46′E
- Country: Poland
- Voivodeship: Lesser Poland
- County: Tarnów
- Gmina: Zakliczyn
- Website: http://www.zakliczyn.com/wioski/borowa.php

Borowa [bɔˈrɔva] is a village in the administrative district of Gmina Zakliczyn, within Tarnów County, Lesser Poland Voivodeship, in southern Poland.
