= Rzepiennik Marciszewski =

- Village
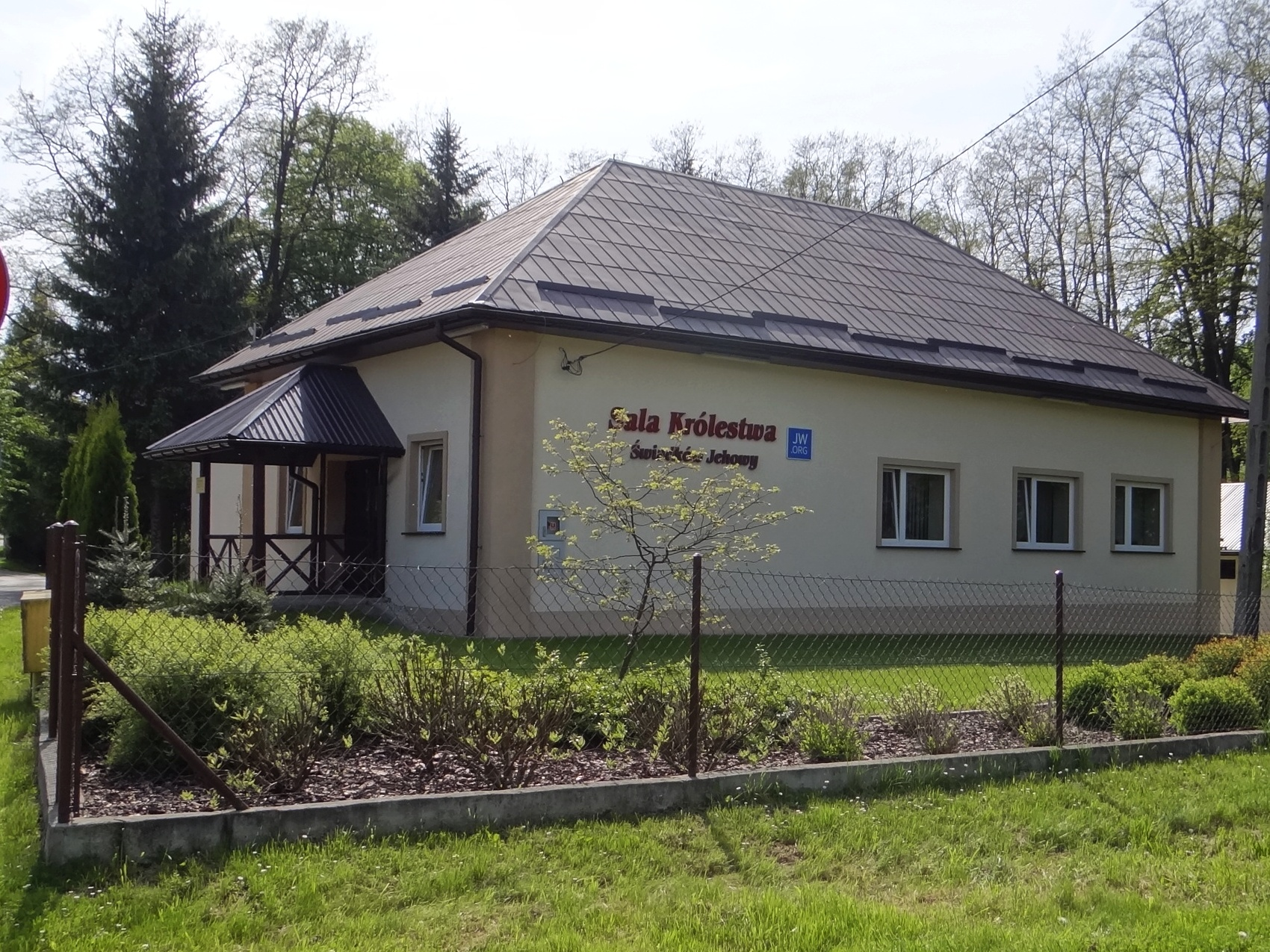
- Jehovah's Witnesses church

- Location within Poland
- Coordinates: 49°50′N 21°1′E
- Country: Poland
- Voivodeship: Lesser Poland
- County: Tarnów
- Gmina: Gromnik
- Population: 707

Rzepiennik Marciszewski [ʐɛˈpjɛnnik mart͡ɕiˈʂɛfski] is a village in the administrative district of Gmina Gromnik, within Tarnów County, Lesser Poland Voivodeship, in southern Poland.
