= Wola Stróska =

- Village
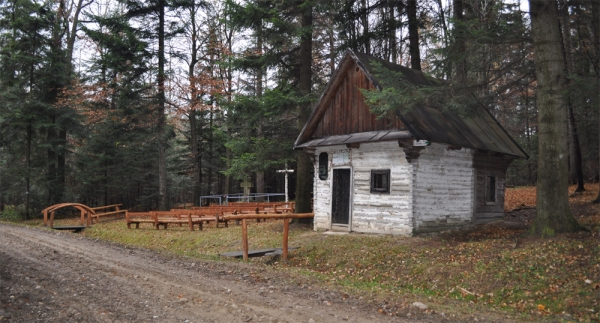

- Location within Poland
- Coordinates: 49°50′N 20°46′E
- Country: Poland
- Voivodeship: Lesser Poland
- County: Tarnów
- Gmina: Zakliczyn
- Website: http://www.zakliczyn.com/wioski/wola_stroska.php

Wola Stróska [ˈvɔla ˈstruska] is a village in the administrative district of Gmina Zakliczyn, within Tarnów County, Lesser Poland Voivodeship, in southern Poland. The village has approximately 394 residents (2021).
