= Chojnik, Lesser Poland Voivodeship =

Chojnik
- Village
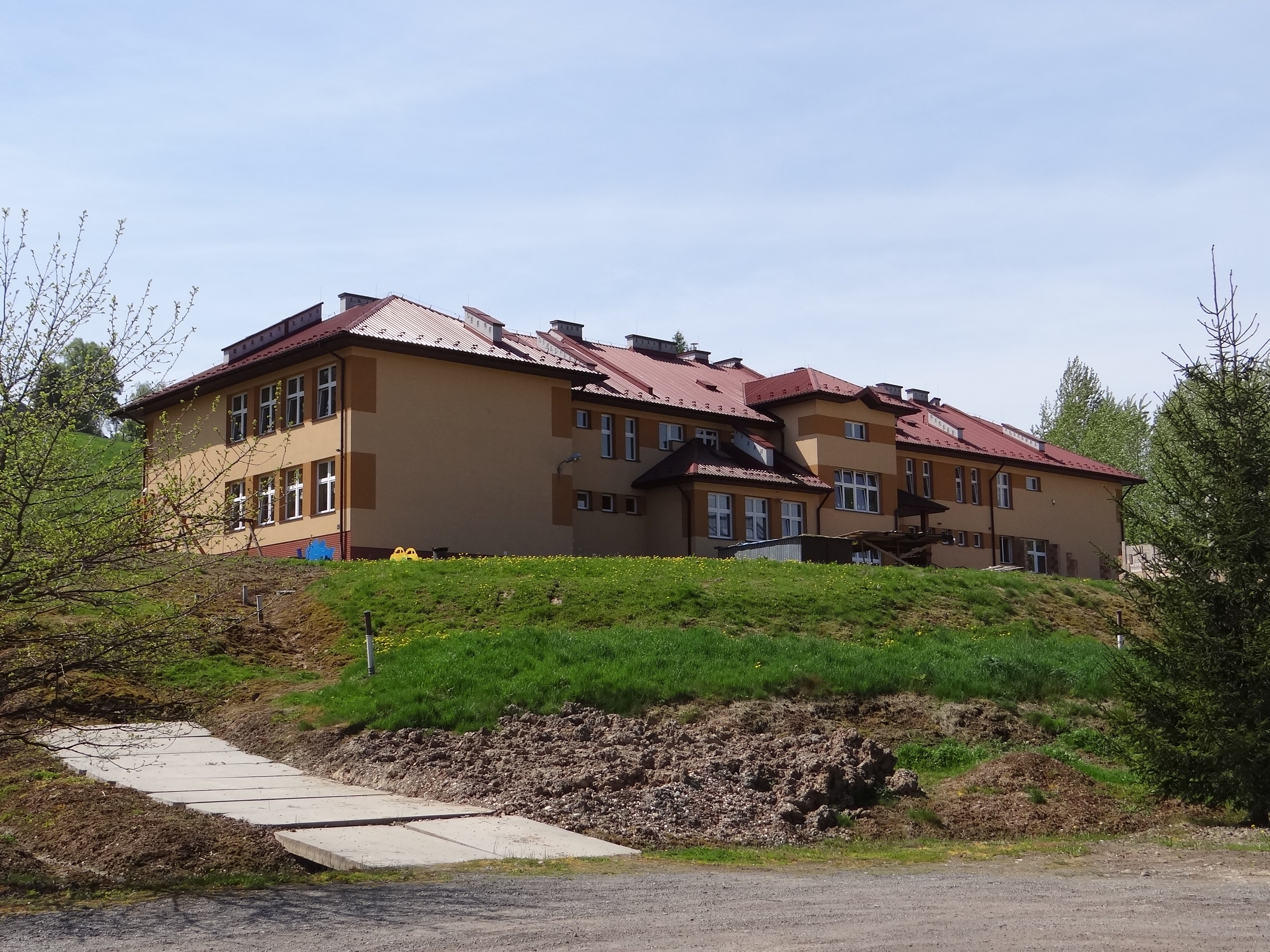
- School

- Location within Poland
- Coordinates: 49°51′N 20°59′E
- Country: Poland
- Voivodeship: Lesser Poland
- County: Tarnów
- Gmina: Gromnik
- Population: 1,311

Chojnik [ˈxɔi̯nik] is a village in the administrative district of Gmina Gromnik, within Tarnów County, Lesser Poland Voivodeship, in southern Poland.
