= Kończyska =

- Village
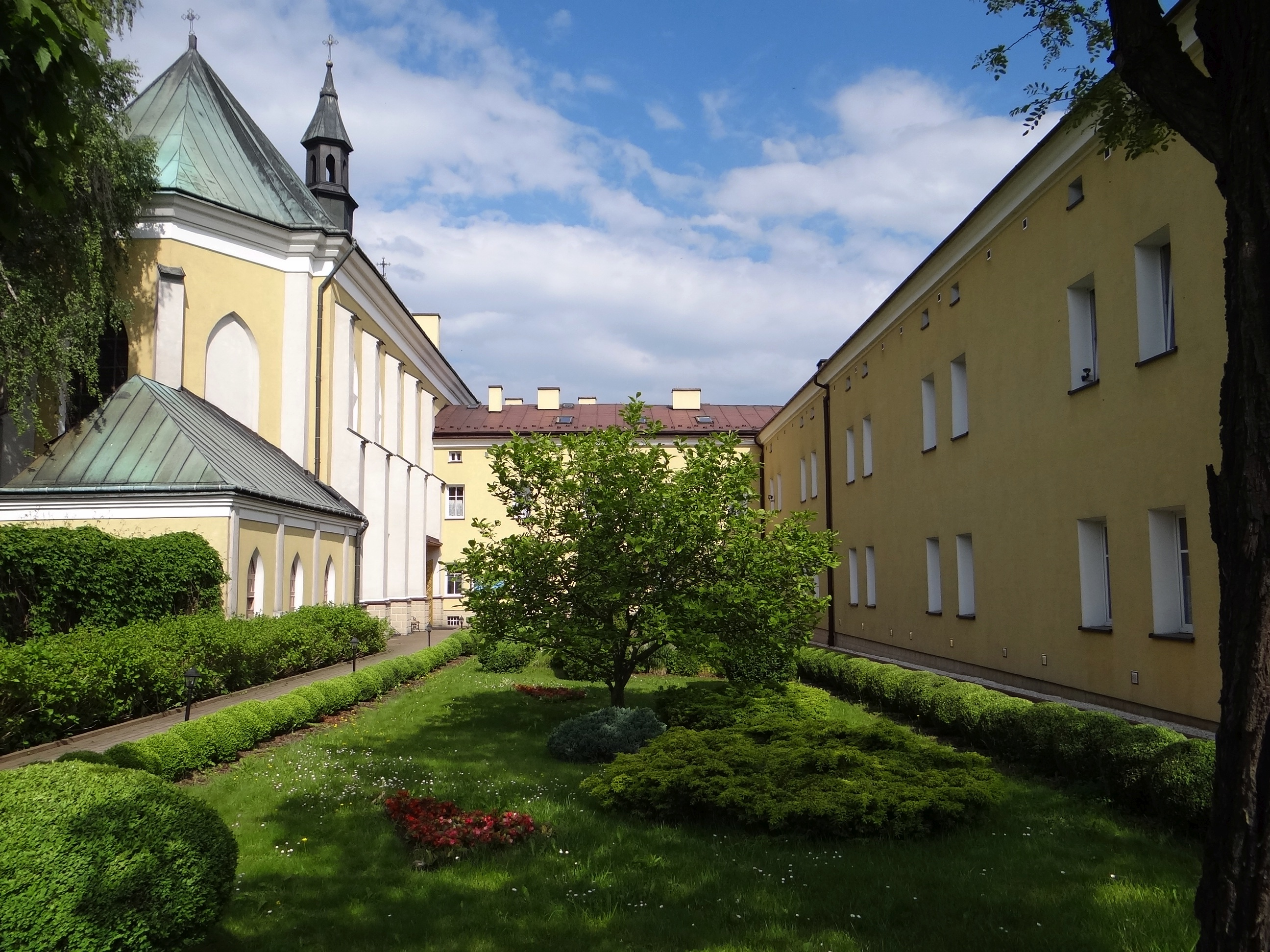
- Monastery

- Location within Poland
- Coordinates: 49°50′N 20°49′E
- Country: Poland
- Voivodeship: Lesser Poland
- County: Tarnów
- Gmina: Zakliczyn
- Website: http://www.zakliczyn.com/wioski/konczyska.php

Kończyska [kɔɲˈt͡ʂɨska] is a village in the administrative district of Gmina Zakliczyn, within Tarnów County, Lesser Poland Voivodeship, in southern Poland.
