= Słona =

- Village
- Location within Poland
- Coordinates: 49°50′N 20°51′E
- Country: Poland
- Voivodeship: Lesser Poland
- County: Tarnów
- Gmina: Zakliczyn
- Website: http://www.zakliczyn.com/wioski/slona.php

Słona [ˈswɔna] is a Polish village in the administrative district of Gmina Zakliczyn, within Tarnów County, Lesser Poland Voivodeship, in southern Poland.
