= Gierałt coat of arms =

Polish coat of arms

Gierałt
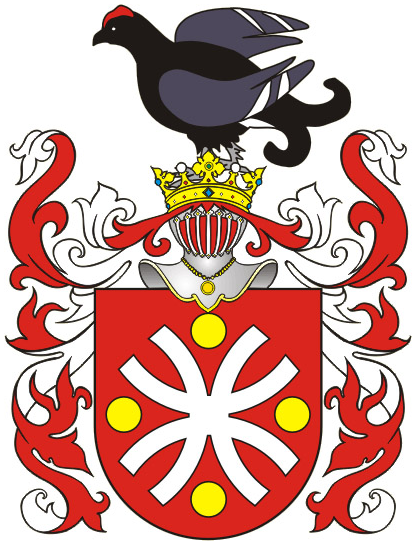
- Alternative names: Cicierza, Gerald, Gieralt, Hosmorog, Osmarog, Osmioróg
- Earliest mention: 9th century
- Towns: none
- Families: 51 names altogether: Bełcznicki, Dobromirski, Dobromyski, Dymieński, Fasciszewski, Fastykowski, Faściszewski, Gerald, Gerlach, Giec, Gieralt, Gierałt, Gierzyński, Ginejt, Gniewek, Jaguczyński, Janikowski, Kentrzyński, Kętrowicz, Kętrzyński, Koczonowski, Kostech, Krzystkowski, Magnus, Mozgawa, Mozgawski, Osmoróg, Ośmioróg, Reszyński, Rosław, Rzeszyński, Siemiechowski, Skrętowski, Słonecki, Surgut, Surkont, Surzycki, Szadziewicz, Timka, Towiański, Wężycki, Wierzchosław, Wieścki, Wiszycki, Wolski, Wrobliski, Wróbliński, Wróbliski, Wyrzycki, Wyżycki, Zemleszczery

Gierałt is a Polish coat of arms. It was used by several szlachta families during the time of the Polish–Lithuanian Commonwealth.

== Notable bearers ==
Notable bearers of this coat of arms include:

== See also ==
- Polish heraldry
- Heraldry
- Coat of arms
- List of Polish nobility coats of arms
