= Ciężkowice-Rożnów Landscape Park =

Protected area in Poland

Coordinates: 49°49′01″N 20°49′27″E

- Ciężkowicko-Rożnowski Park Krajobrazowy
- IUCN category V (protected landscape/seascape)
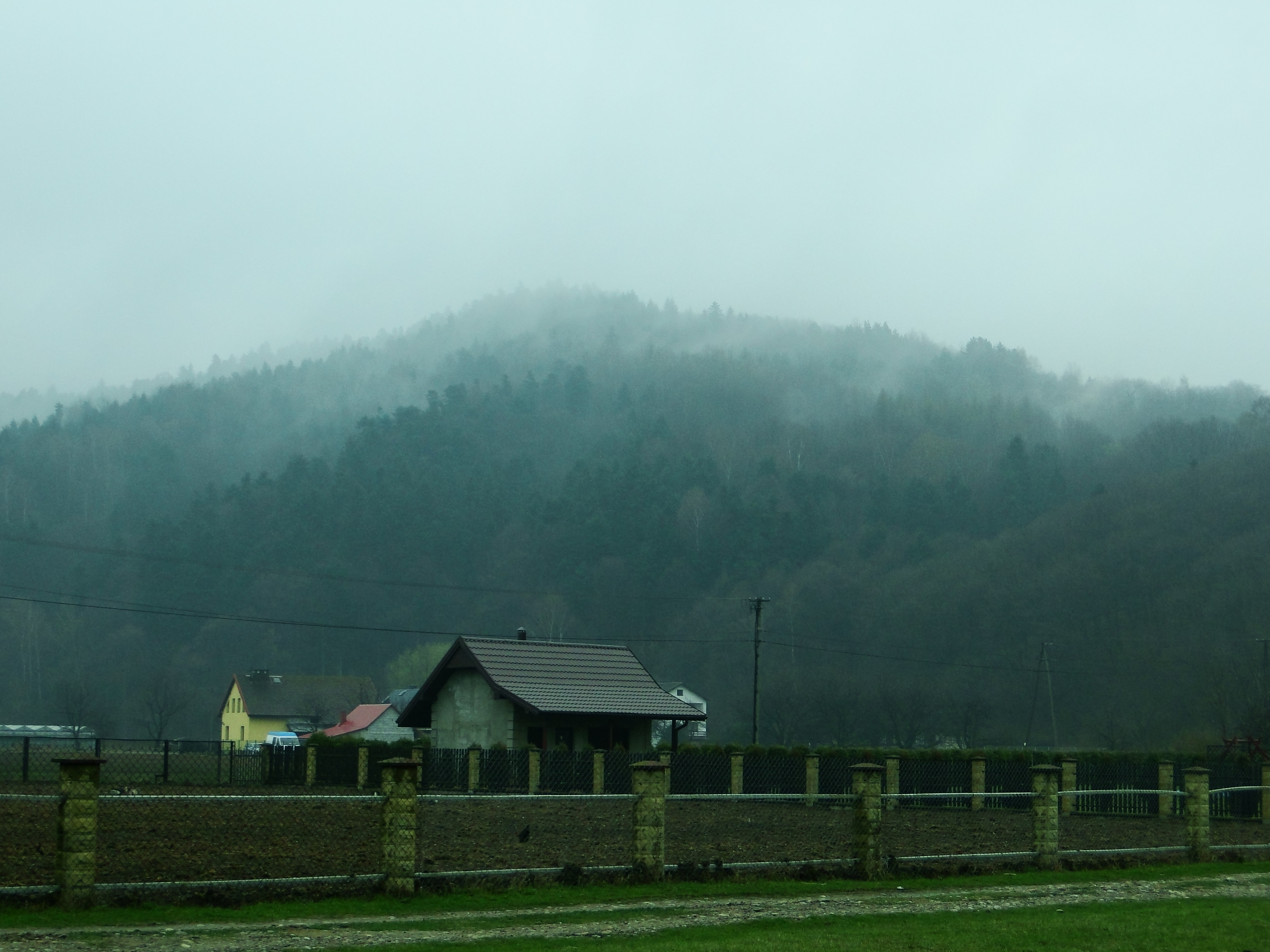
- Interactive map of Ciężkowice-Rożnów Landscape Park
- Location: Lesser Poland Voivodeship
- Area: 176.34 km^{2} (68.09 sq mi)
- Established: 1995

Ciężkowice-Rożnów Landscape Park (Ciężkowicko-Rożnowski Park Krajobrazowy) is a protected area (Landscape Park) in southern Poland, established in 1995, covering an area of 176.34 square kilometres (68.09 sq mi).

The Park lies within Lesser Poland Voivodeship: in Brzesko County (Gmina Czchów), Nowy Sącz County (Gmina Gródek nad Dunajcem, Gmina Korzenna) and Tarnów County (Gmina Ciężkowice, Gmina Gromnik, Gmina Rzepiennik Strzyżewski, Gmina Zakliczyn).

Within the Landscape Park are two nature reserves.
