= Faściszowa =

- Village
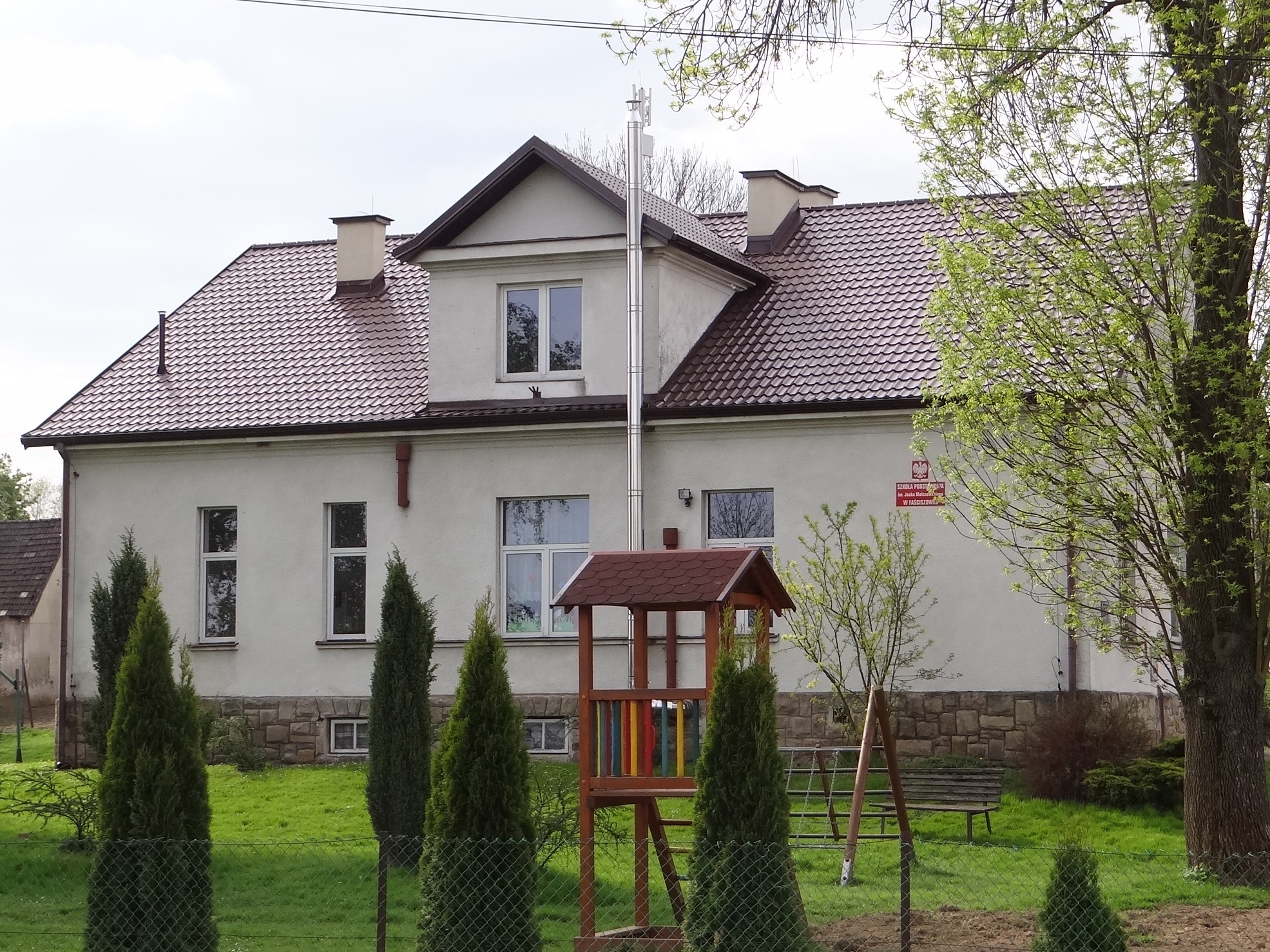
- School

- Location within Poland
- Coordinates: 49°51′N 20°50′E
- Country: Poland
- Voivodeship: Lesser Poland
- County: Tarnów
- Gmina: Zakliczyn
- Website: http://www.zakliczyn.com/wioski/fasciszowa.php

Faściszowa [faɕt͡ɕiˈʂɔva] is a village in the administrative district of Gmina Zakliczyn, within Tarnów County, Lesser Poland Voivodeship, in southern Poland.
