= Tworkowa =

- Village
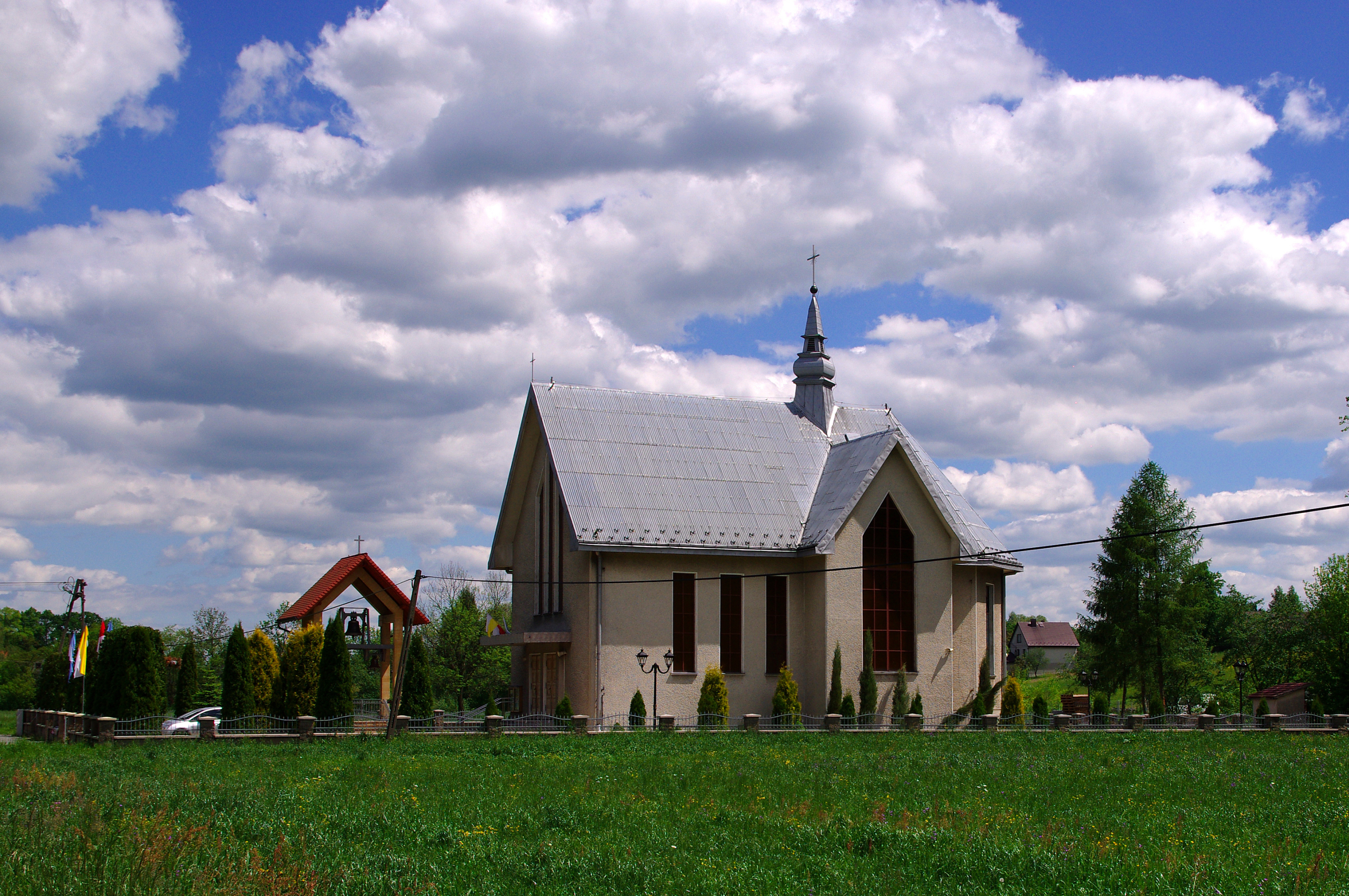
- Church of Our Lady of Fatima

- Location within Poland
- Coordinates: 49°52′N 20°40′E
- Country: Poland
- Voivodeship: Lesser Poland
- County: Brzesko
- Gmina: Czchów

Population (approx.)
  - Total: 1,000

Tworkowa [tfɔrˈkɔva] is a village in the administrative district of Gmina Czchów, within Brzesko County, Lesser Poland Voivodeship, in southern Poland.

The village has an approximate population of 1,000.
