= Filipowice, Tarnów County =

Filipowice
- Village
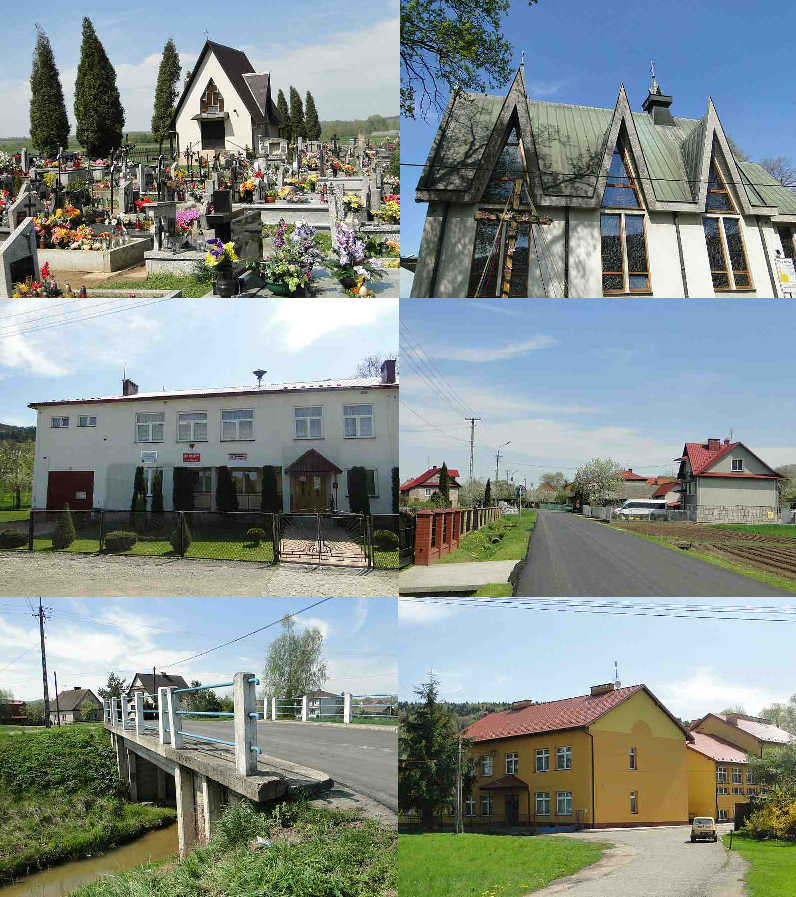

- Location within Poland
- Coordinates: 49°50′N 20°43′E
- Country: Poland
- Voivodeship: Lesser Poland
- County: Tarnów
- Gmina: Zakliczyn
- Website: http://www.zakliczyn.com/wioski/filipowice.php

Filipowice [filipɔˈvit͡sɛ] is a village in the administrative district of Gmina Zakliczyn, within Tarnów County, Lesser Poland Voivodeship, in southern Poland.
