= Gwoździec, Lesser Poland Voivodeship =

Gwoździec
- Village
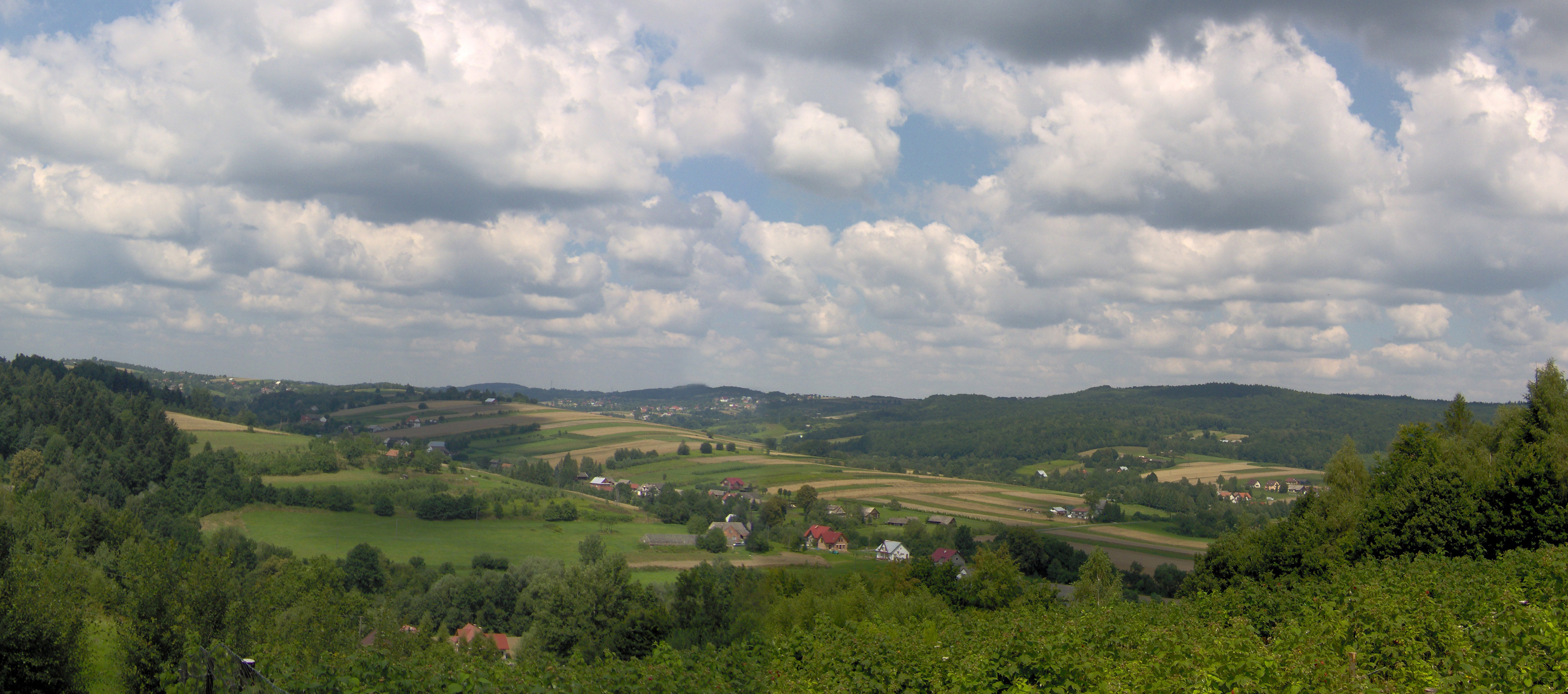
- Gwoździec valley panorama

- Location within Poland
- Coordinates: 49°53′N 20°45′E
- Country: Poland
- Voivodeship: Lesser Poland
- County: Tarnów
- Gmina: Zakliczyn
- Website: Gwoździec

Gwoździec [ˈɡvɔʑd͡ʑɛt͡s] is a village in the administrative district of Gmina Zakliczyn, within Tarnów County, Lesser Poland Voivodeship, in southern Poland.
