= Gromnik, Lesser Poland Voivodeship =

Gromnik
- Village
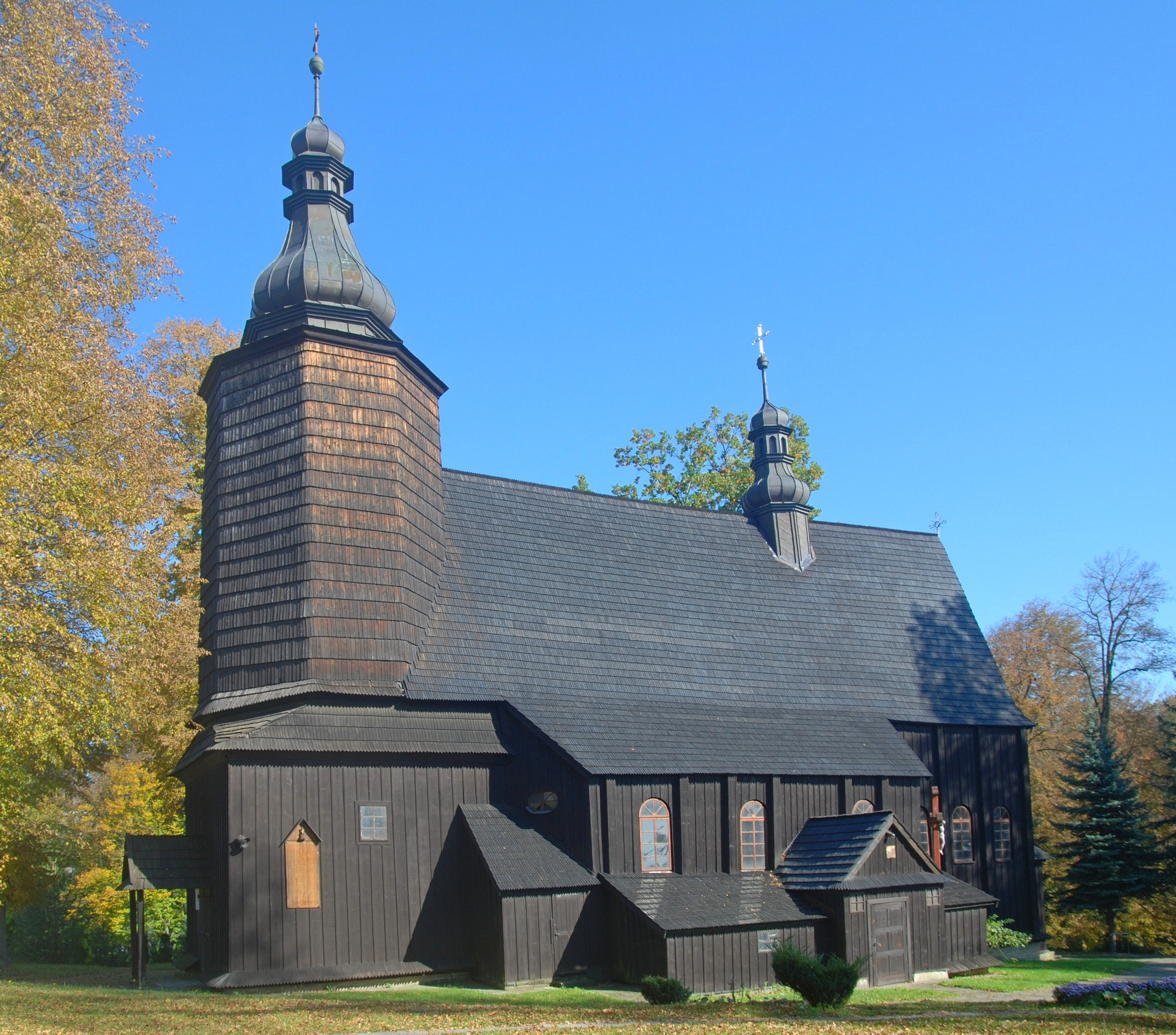
- Church of Saint Martin

- Location within Poland
- Coordinates: 49°50′N 20°57′E
- Country: Poland
- Voivodeship: Lesser Poland
- County: Tarnów
- Gmina: Gromnik

Population
  - Total: 3,285
- Website: http://www.gromnik.pl

Gromnik [ˈɡrɔmnik] is a village in Tarnów County, Lesser Poland Voivodeship, in southern Poland. It is the seat of the gmina (administrative district) called Gmina Gromnik.
