= Paleśnica =

- Village
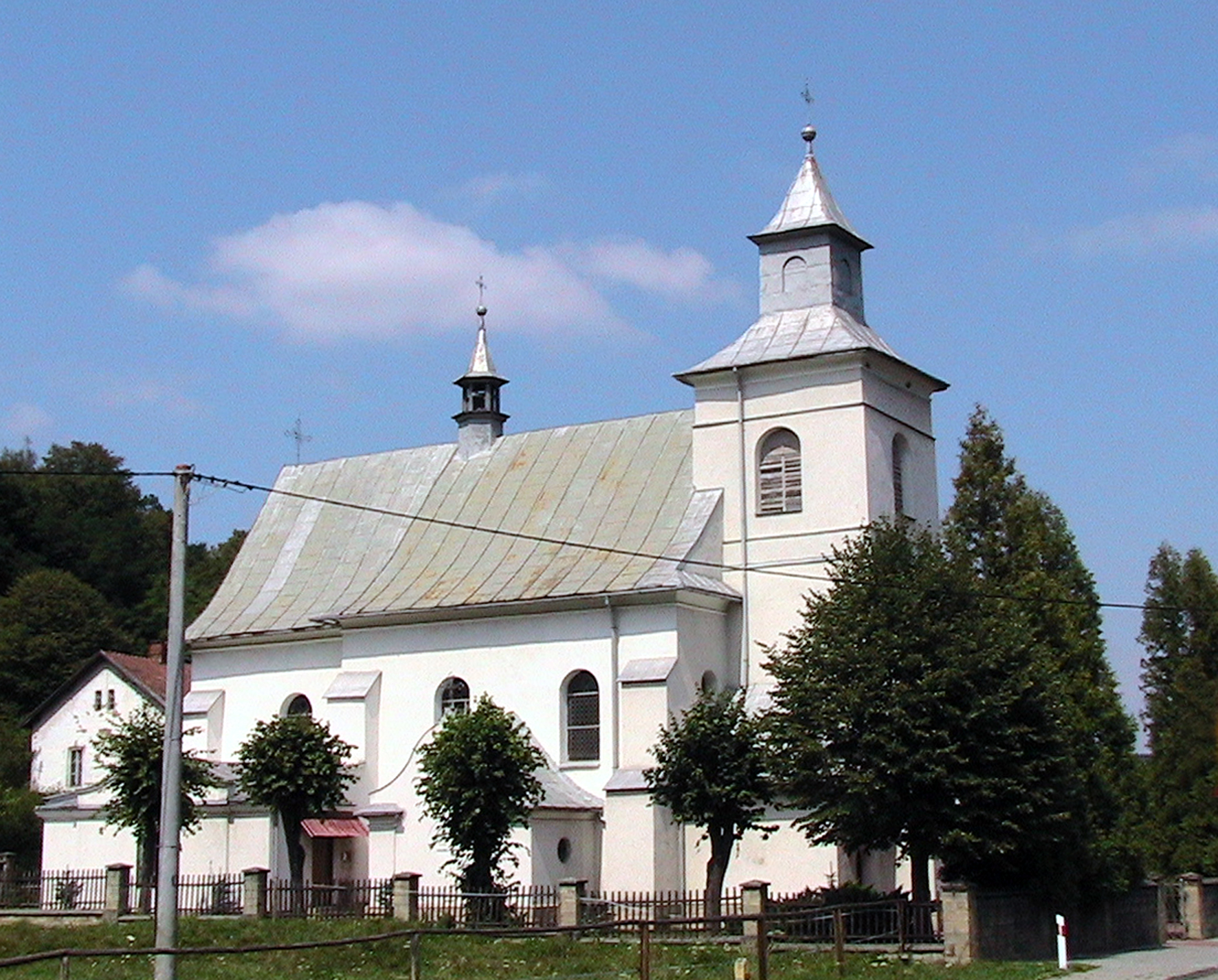
- Church of Saint Justina

- Location within Poland
- Coordinates: 49°48′N 20°48′E
- Country: Poland
- Voivodeship: Lesser Poland
- County: Tarnów
- Gmina: Zakliczyn
- Elevation: 260 m (850 ft)

Population
  - Total: 500
- Website: http://www.zakliczyn.com/wioski/palesnica.php

Paleśnica [palɛɕˈnit͡sa] is a village in the administrative district of Gmina Zakliczyn, within Tarnów County, Lesser Poland Voivodeship, in southern Poland.

The land around Paleśnica is mountainous in the southwest and flat in the southeast. The highest point in the area is 502 meters above sea level, and is located 1.6 km to the southeast of Paleśnica.
