= Wojnicz =

Town in Lesser Poland Voivodeship, Poland

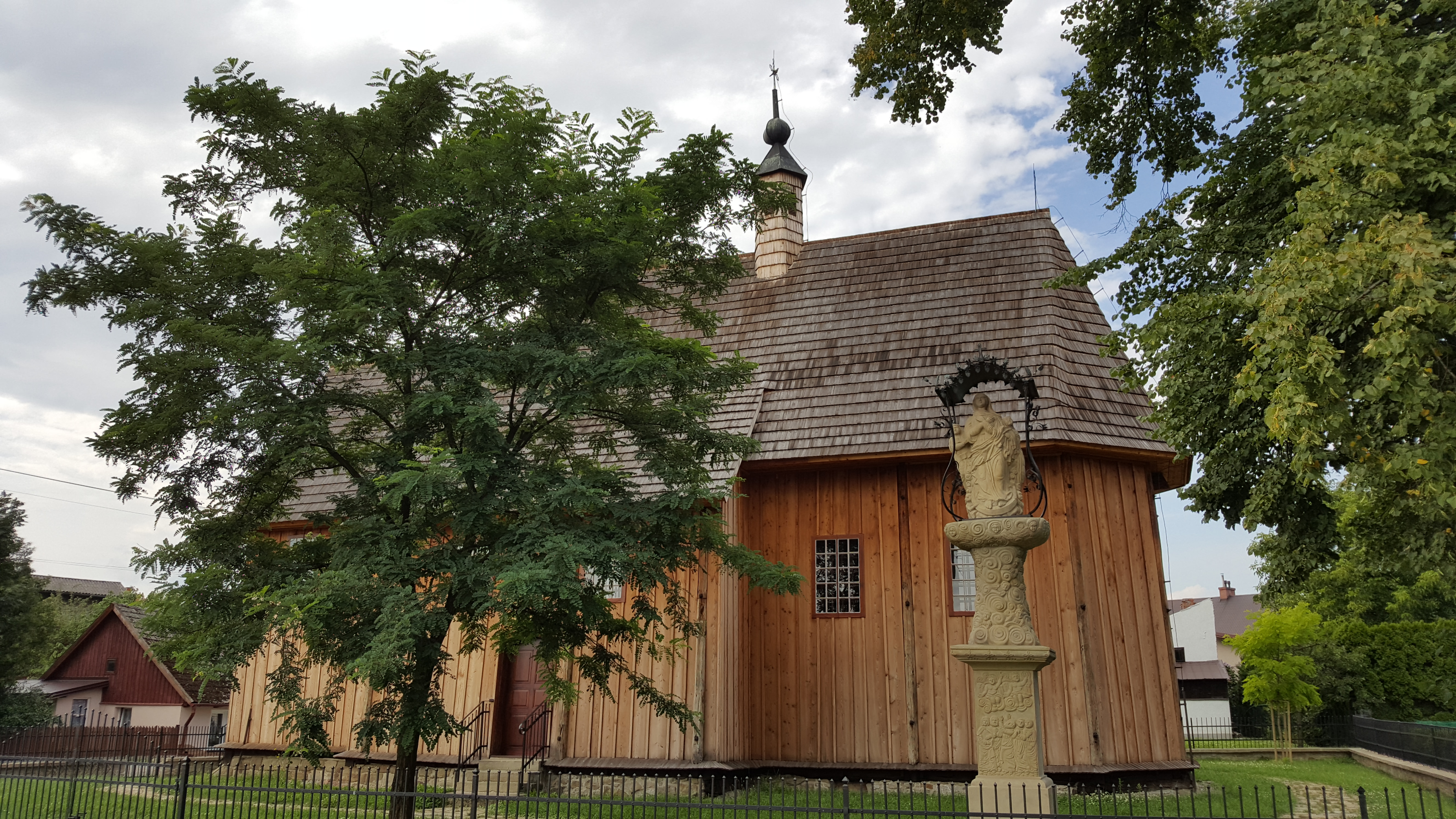
- Wooden church of St. Leonard in Wojnicz

- Coat of arms

- Location within Poland
- Coordinates: 49°58′N 20°50′E
- Country: Poland
- Voivodeship: Lesser Poland
- County: Tarnów
- Gmina: Wojnicz
- Established: tenth century
- Town rights: 1278–1934, 2007

Government
  - Mayor: Tadeusz Bąk (PiS)

Area
  - Total: 8.50 km^{2} (3.28 sq mi)

Population (2007)
  - Total: 3,404
  - Density: 400/km^{2} (1,040/sq mi)
- Time zone: UTC+1 (CET)
  - Summer (DST): UTC+2 (CEST)
- Postal code: 32–830
- Area code: +48 14
- Car plates: KTA
- Website: http://www.wojnicz.pl

Wojnicz (Polish pronunciation: [ˈvɔjɲitʂ]) is an ancient historic town in Tarnów County, Lesser Poland Voivodeship. In the early medieval period of the Polish state, it became one of the most important centres in the province of Lesser Poland, as part of the system of Dunajec river castles. It became the seat of a Castellan and prospered from the 13th century to the first half of the 17th century, being on an international trade route bordering Hungary and the Ottoman Empire. It had town and market rights, its church was raised to collegiate status with links to the Jagiellonian University in Kraków 64 km away.

It was the scene of the Battle of Wojnicz on 3 October 1655, against Swedish invaders. Wojnicz was burned down around eight times in the course of its thousand-year history. In trade terms it lost out from the 17th century to its junior neighbour 12 km to the East, the city of Tarnów. It was further disadvantaged during Habsburg rule when the new Kraków–Tarnów railway was positioned 10 km to the north. It remained a backwater throughout the Second Republic of Poland in the inter-war years and was stripped of its town rights. Wojnicz regained its Town rights, after 70 years, in 2007. The Coat of arms of Wojnicz consists of an escutcheon bearing the figure of Roman martyr, St. Lawrence against a gridiron, symbolising his gruesome death by roasting.

== Location ==
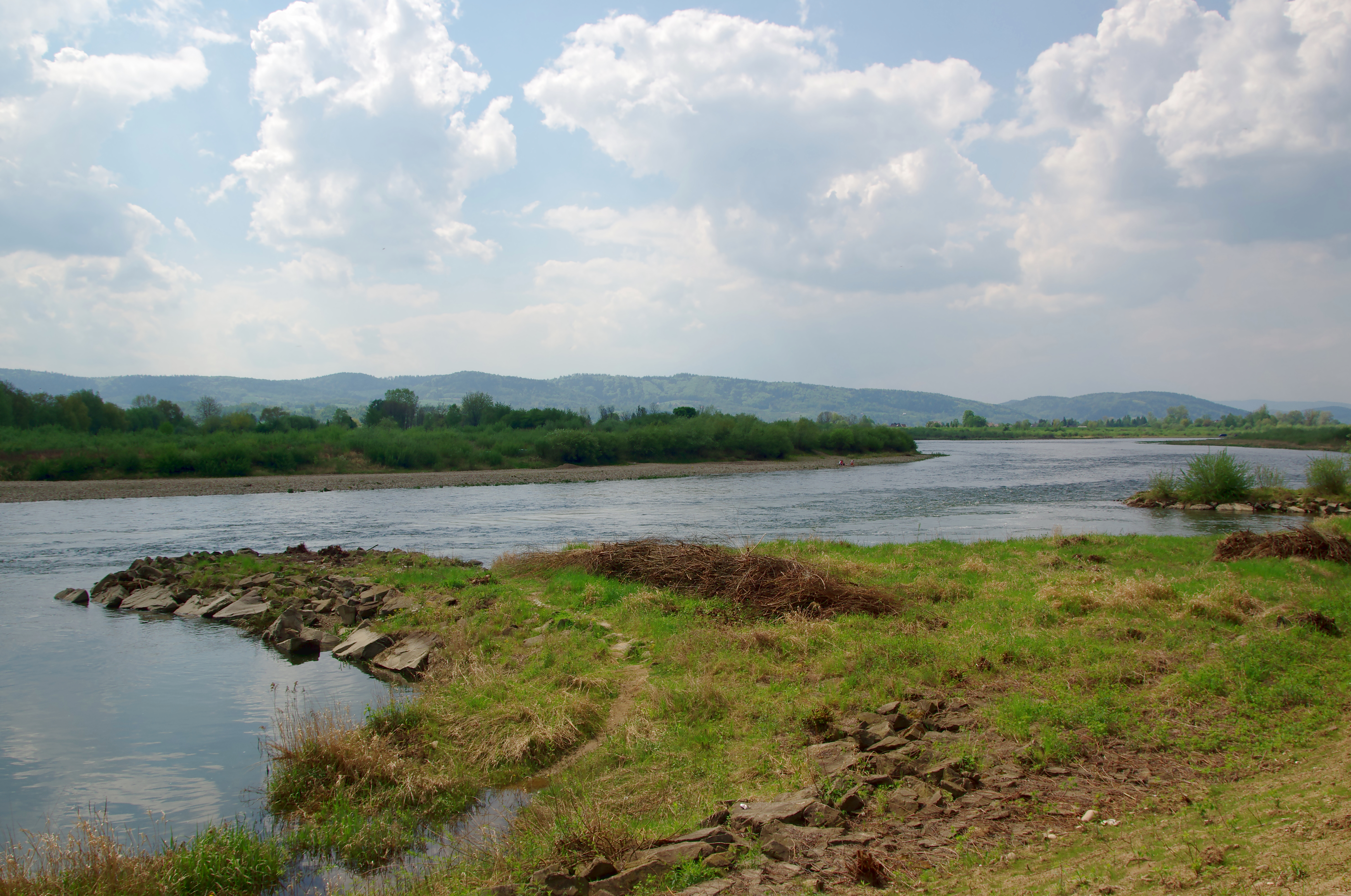
Dunajec river at nearby Melsztyn

Wojnicz lies on the boundary of two distinct geographical regions in Poland: the Sandomierz Basin and the Western Carpathians. The Dunajec, a major tributary of the Vistula River, flows 2 km east of the present town centre. The decline of Wojnicz deprived it of a rail link when a railway line was planned in the 1850s. It is however located at the intersection of European route E40, and local route number 975 from Dąbrowa Tarnowska to Nowy Sącz.

== Origin of the name ==
In 1217, the town was called Woynicze. In 1224, another spelling was Woyniz, and in 1239, Woynicz. Polish language specialists Kazimierz Rymut and Stanisław Rospond believe that the name Wojnicz comes from the surname Wojno, which was then changed to Wojnice, Wojnic, and finally – Wojnicz.

== History ==
=== Medieval and Renaissance period ===
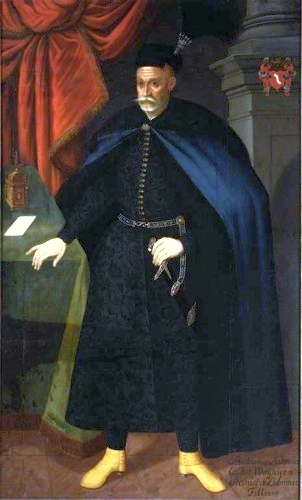
Sebastian Lubomirski castellan of Wojnicz

Wojnicz is one of the oldest urban settlements in southern Lesser Poland. The original Slavic settlers appeared in the 8th or 9th century, and Wojnicz emerged as a gród of the local warrior clan. According to legend, some time in the late 10th century, warriors (Polish: wojowie) of Mieszko I or his son Bolesław I Chrobry built a military stronghold and named it Wojnicz in their honour. In 1109, the original parish church dedicated to Saint Lawrence was erected, probably on initiative of Prince Bolesław III Wrymouth, as a votum for victory in the Battle of Nakło. In the 12th century, Wojnicz became a castellany, part of the Dunajec river fortification system and received Market rights. Between the late 12th-century and 1794, 67 noblemen held the office of Castellan of Wojnicz. In 1239, after Princess Kinga of Poland was engaged to Bolesław V the Chaste in Wojnicz, the settlement was granted town rights, although no documents are extant to confirm this. It was first recorded as a town, with a defensive wall in 1278. In 1379, the town was badly affected by a fire. In 1381, by order of King Louis I of Hungary Wojnicz became a Powiat, county town, in Sandomierz Voivodeship. It remained one of major urban centres of Lesser Poland, and on 13 September 1394 Queen Jadwiga of Poland came on a visit. In 1465, a collegiate school was opened, and the parish church was rebuilt in Gothic style. Twenty years later, the town was once again affected by fire.

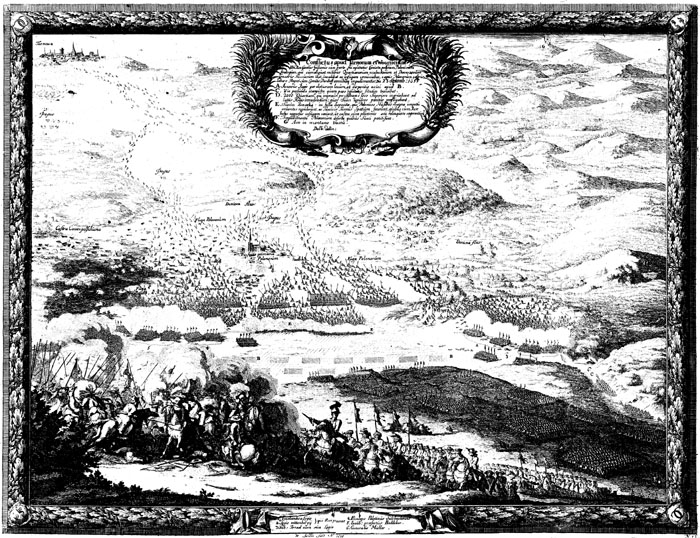
Dahlbergh's Battle of Wojnicz

During Poland's Golden Age, Wojnicz developed and prospered. In 1527, a bridge over the Dunajec river was built. In 1530, the first Craft guild was founded. In 1575 the town was recorded as having a town hall with a bell and clock-tower. Like other places in Lesser Poland, Wojnicz suffered greatly during the Swedish invasion of Poland. On 3 October 1655, it was the scene of the Battle of Wojnicz. On 19 March 1657 the town was sacked and burned by troops of George II Rakoczi of Hungary. During the Great Northern War, Swedish invaders once again destroyed the town in 1702. After that devastation, Wojnicz never really regained its civic importance.

=== Polish Partitions ===
==== Habsburg Galicia ====
In 1772, Wojnicz was annexed by the Habsburg Empire (see Partitions of Poland). The 19th century was not kind to the town: the Austrians kept Wojnicz County until 1867. However, in 1831 and 1895 further fires destroyed large parts of Wojnicz, including the historic town hall. In 1856, the Galician Railway of Archduke Charles Louis bypassed the town, laying its route some ten kilometers to the north.

=== World War I ===
With the outbreak of World War I, the Russian Empire conducted a Blitzkrieg that overwhelmed much of Galicia right up to Kraków, but were repulsed eastwards by the Austrian army up to the Dunajec river and remained stationed outside Wojnicz throughout 1914 and 1915 until the Russians abandoned nearby Tarnów. The devastation in the province was immense in terms of the human toll and heritage looting. The fallen Austro-Hungarians and Italians in local battles are buried and commemorated in two cemeteries, no. 282 and no. 285 in Wojnicz. Fallen Wojnicz conscripts are commemorated on the war monument in the market square.

=== Independent Poland ===
Wojnicz had remained part of the Austrian Empire until 1918, when it returned to the newly independent Second Polish Republic. In 1928, it was visited by President Ignacy Mościcki, but seven years later Wojnicz was stripped of its town privileges and reduced to the status of a village.

=== Post-war ===
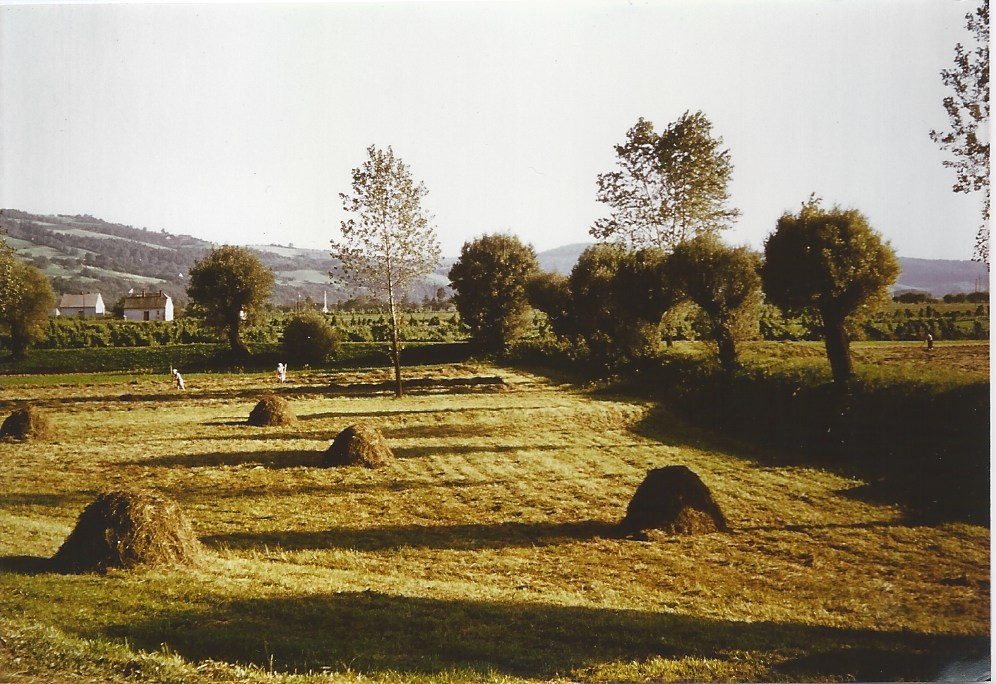
Wojnicz – the Dunajec Floodplain

After the war, it became a backwater throughout the duration of the Polish People's Republic. Wojnicz remained in the Kraków Voivodeship until 1975 when it passed to the newly formed Tarnów Voivodeship until 1999. It did not recover its Town rights until January 1, 2007.

== The Jews of Wojnicz ==
As in many towns across Poland, Jewish settlement was severely restricted since the Middle Ages, which translated as a ban, unless they converted to Christianity. The leading argument for this was protectionism of Polish trade guilds and merchants. They could however get round the restrictions by settling outside a city, as in the case of Kazimierz outside the walls of Kraków. By the 17th century there were established Jewish settlements near Wojnicz in Brzesko, Tarnów and Zakliczyn. An early instance of a Jewish convert living in Wojnicz in the first half of the 18th century was Michał Kędzierski, administrator of the Crown lands on behalf of Starosta, Jakub Karwowski. Their combined abuse of state funds is the subject of a recent historical study. During Habsburg rule some restrictions on Jewish settlement were lifted so that by 1880, there were 200 Jews living in Wojnicz and there was a synagogue. In 1939 during the Second Republic of Poland there were 35 Jewish families in Wojnicz. The German invasion of Poland led to most members of the Wojnicz community being rounded up in 1942 and taken to the Zakliczyn Ghetto from where they were transported to Belzec extermination camp. The Wojnicz synagogue was burnt down by the Germans. A notable survivor of the community was rabbi Chaim Kreiswirth.

== Places of interest ==
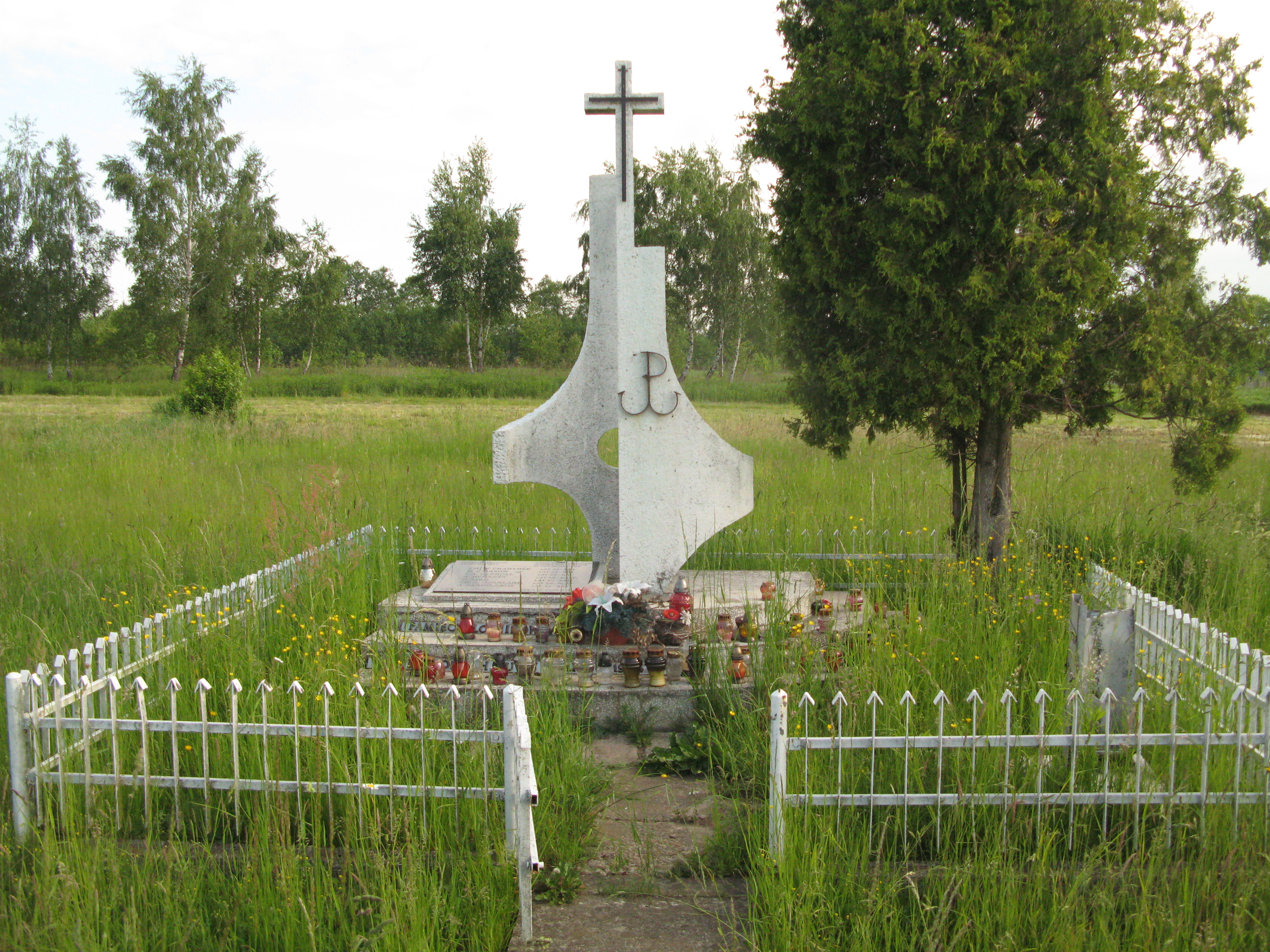
Memorial to WWII RAF aircrew

- Saint Lawrence Church (15th century, later remodelled in Baroque style with notable murals)
- wooden bell tower by St. Lawrence Church (16th century)
- wooden Church of St. Leonard (16th century)
- Neo Gothic Dąmbski Castle (19th century)
- Communal cemetery from the end of the 18th-century, with notable funerary art
- Military Cemetery no. 282 in Wojnicz-Zamoście on Loretańska street by the chapel dedicated to Our Lady of Loreto
- Military Cemetery no. 285
- remains of ramparts (10th – 11th century)
- Panieńska Góra nature reserve
- Memorial to RAF aircrew in Dębina Zakrzowska
- Melsztyn Castle
- Trzewlin Castle, Wielka Wieś, Tarnów County

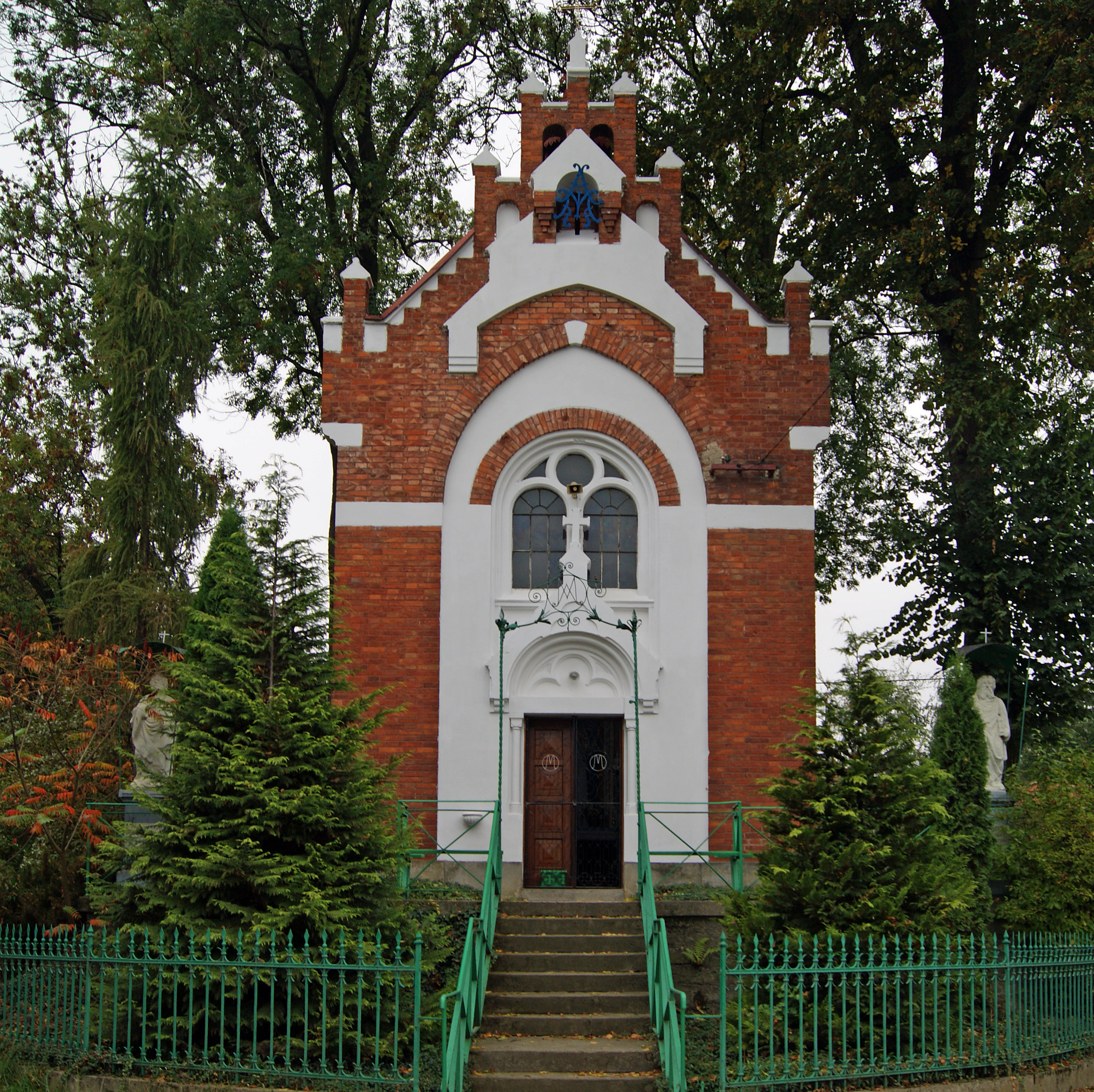
Chapel of Our Lady of Loreto, Wojnicz

=== Tourist routes ===
- Blue route (szlak niebieski) Wojnicz – Panieńska Góra – Wielka Wieś – 8 km
- Green route (szlak zielony) Wojnicz – Jaworsko – Wilkówka – 10 km
- Polish Network of Chapels dedicated to Our Lady of Loreto (Ogólnopolski szlak kaplic loretańskich)
- Pilgrim Way of Saint James, from Sandomierz to Kraków
- Lesser Poland tour of Timber Architecture (Szlak Architektury Drewnianej)

== People ==
- Sebastian Lubomirski
- Jan Wielopolski the elder
- Jan Krzysztof Tarnowski
- Teofil Żebrawski – polymath, mathematician and writer was born in Wojnicz
- Karol Estreicher (senior) – father of Polish Bibliography was a notary in Wojnicz
- Chaim Kreiswirth – Chief Rabbi of the Antwerp Machzikei Hadass community was born in Wojnicz
- Ewa Michalik – pharmacist and founder of the well-known Polish "Patio" restaurant in Shepherd’s Bush in London,

== Gallery ==
Other sights

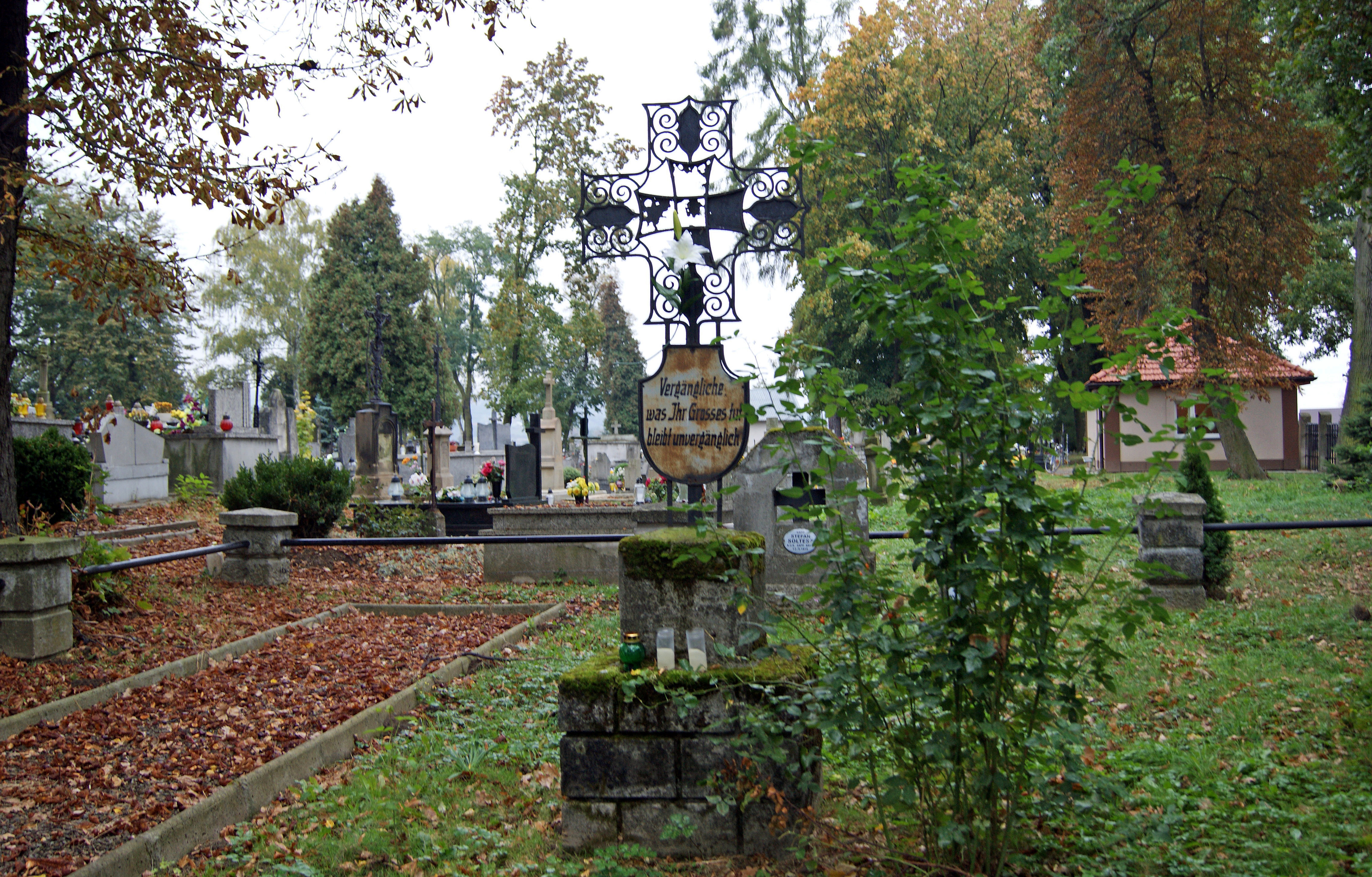
WWI Military cemetery Wojnicz nr. 285

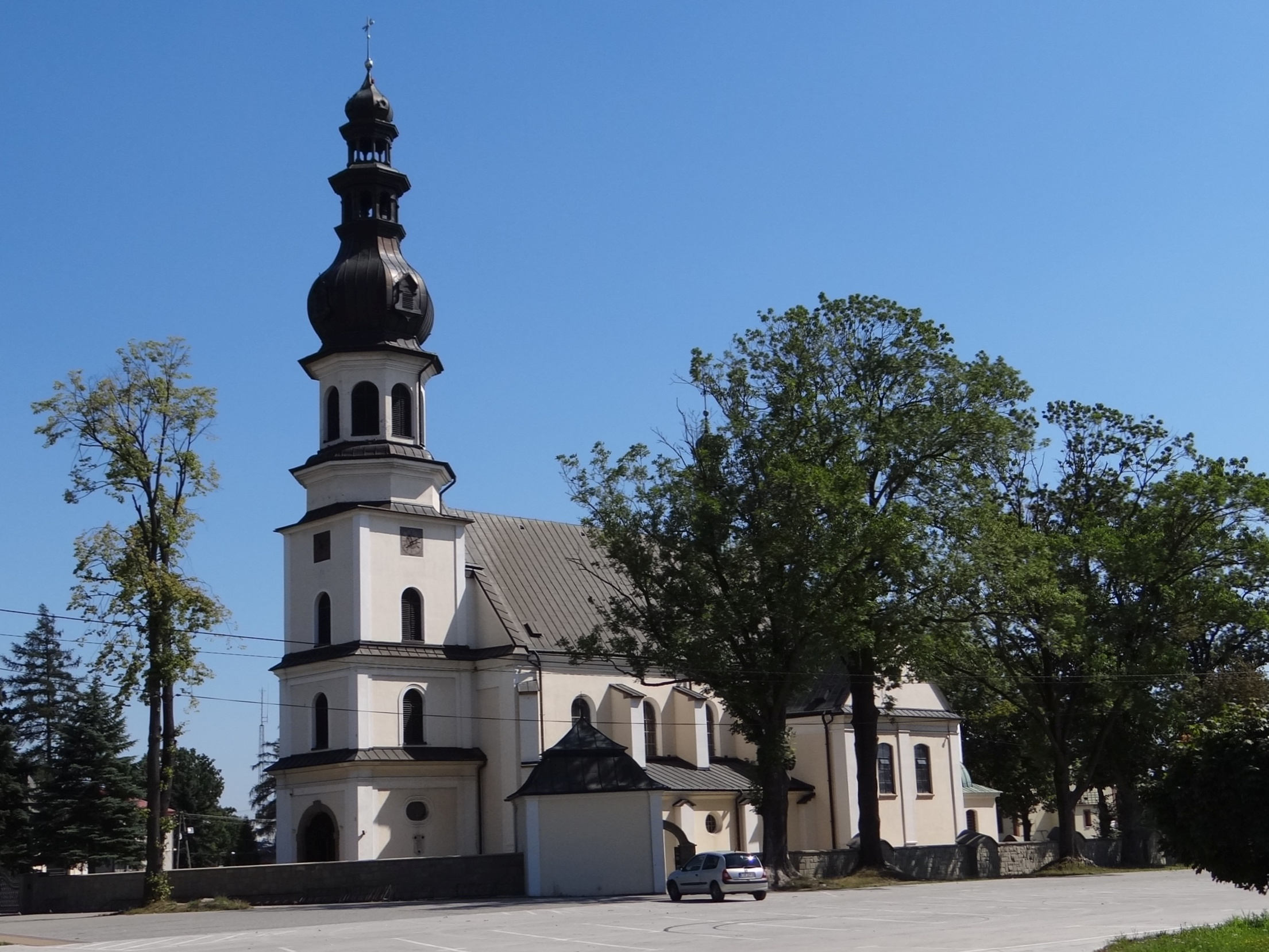
Wojnicz Collegiate church, 17th c.

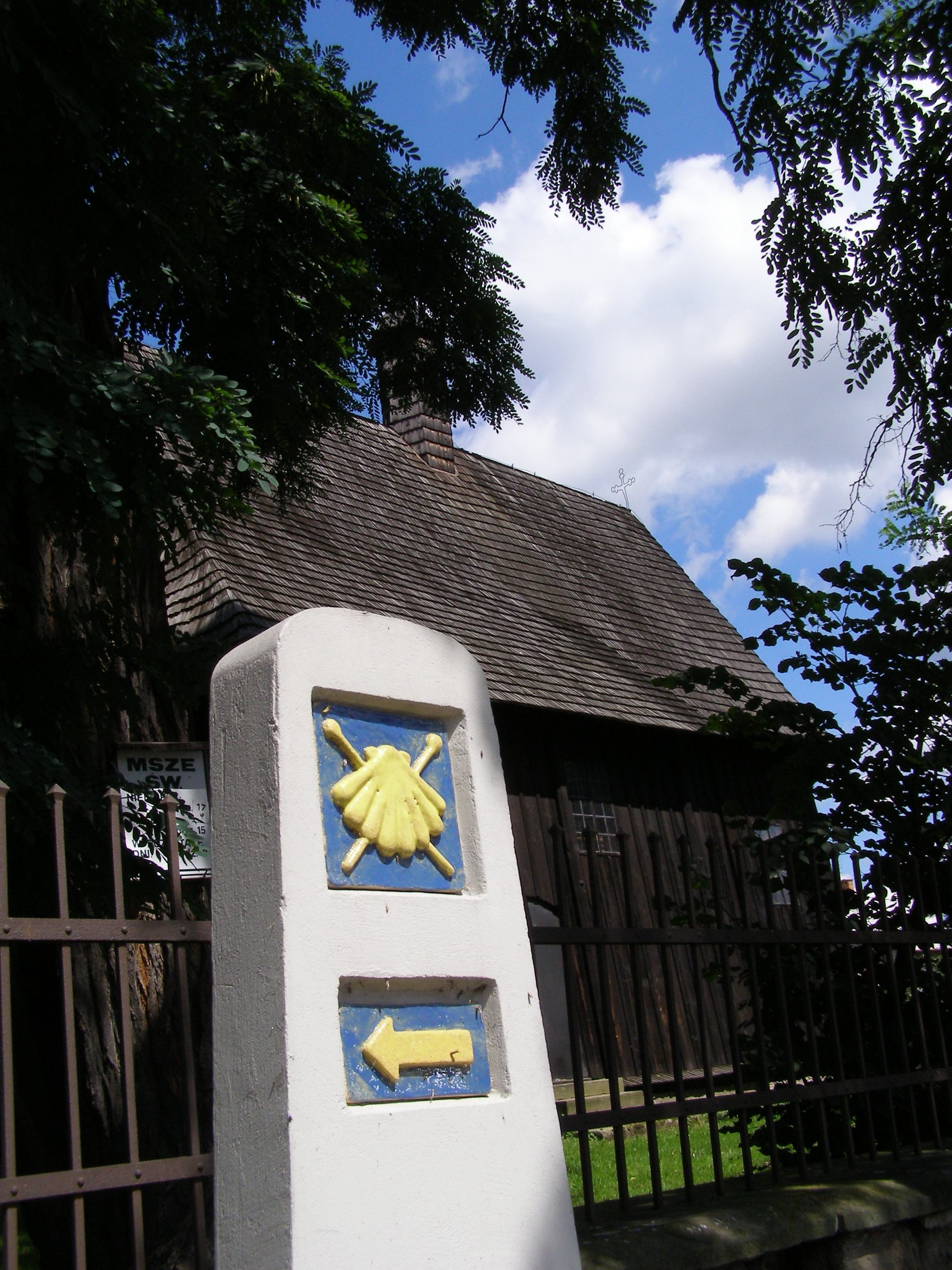
Santiago de Compostela Camino sign in Wojnicz the Sandomierz - Kraków leg

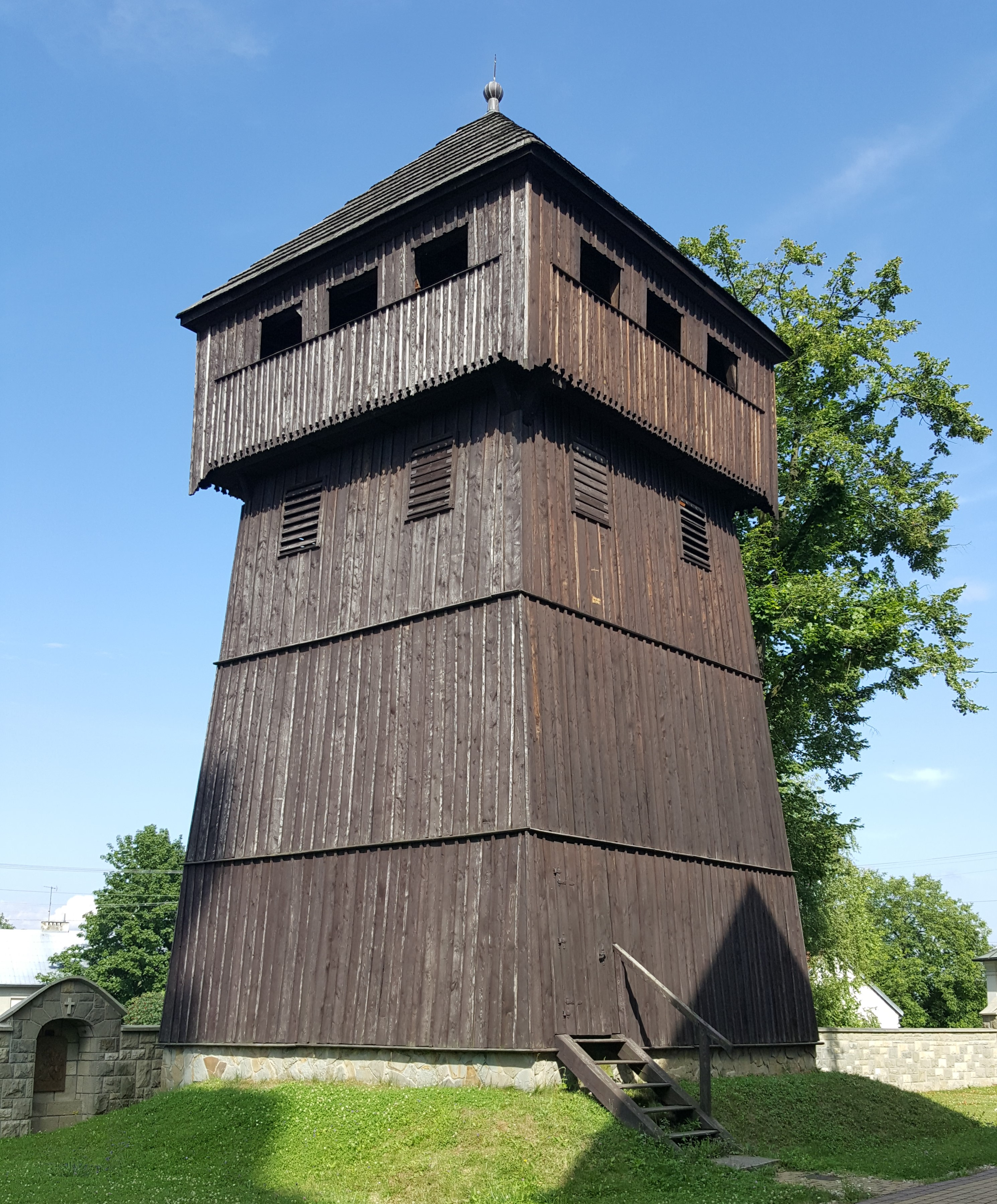
16th-c. wooden bell tower in Wojnicz

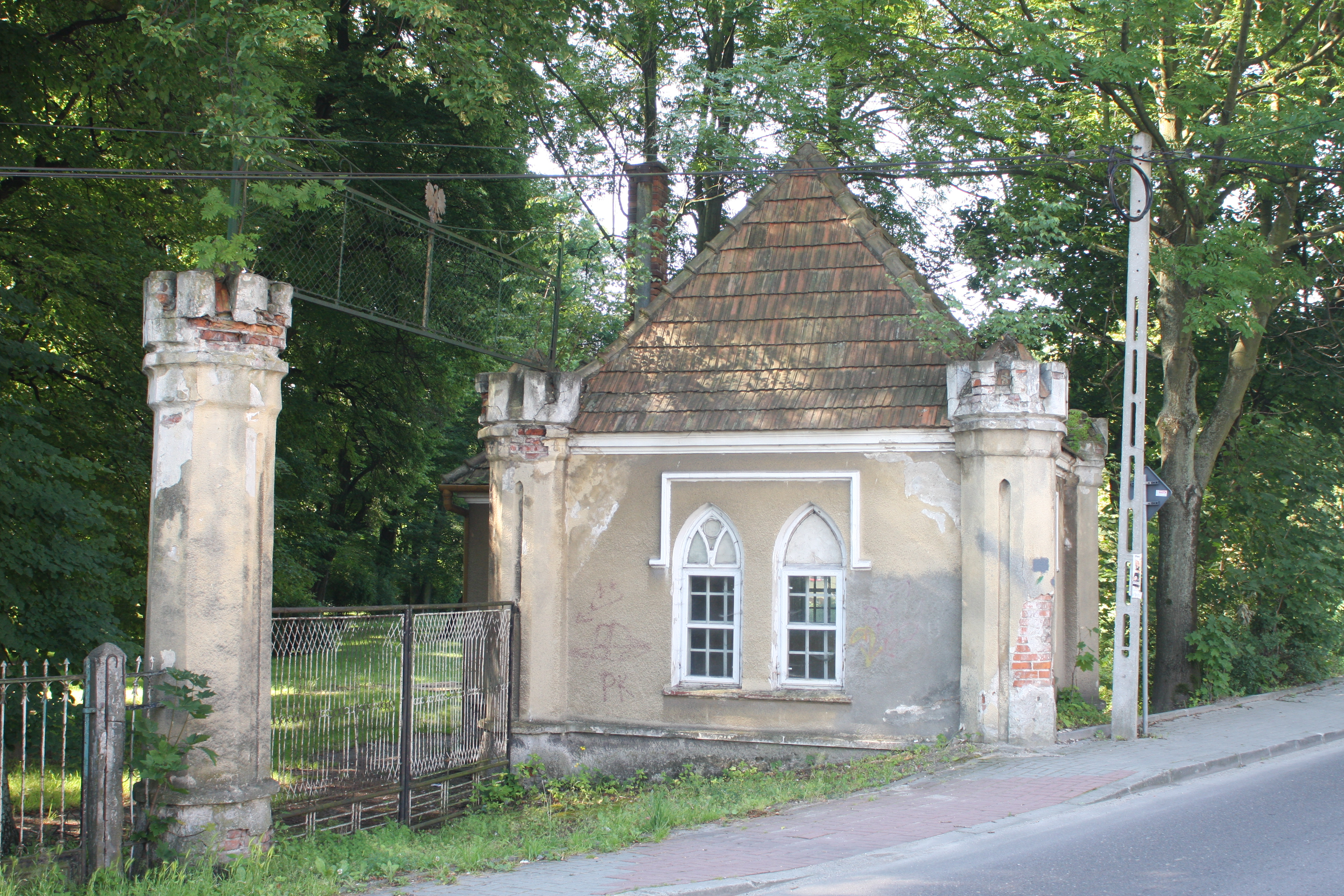
Entrance lodge to Dąmbski Castle 19th-c.

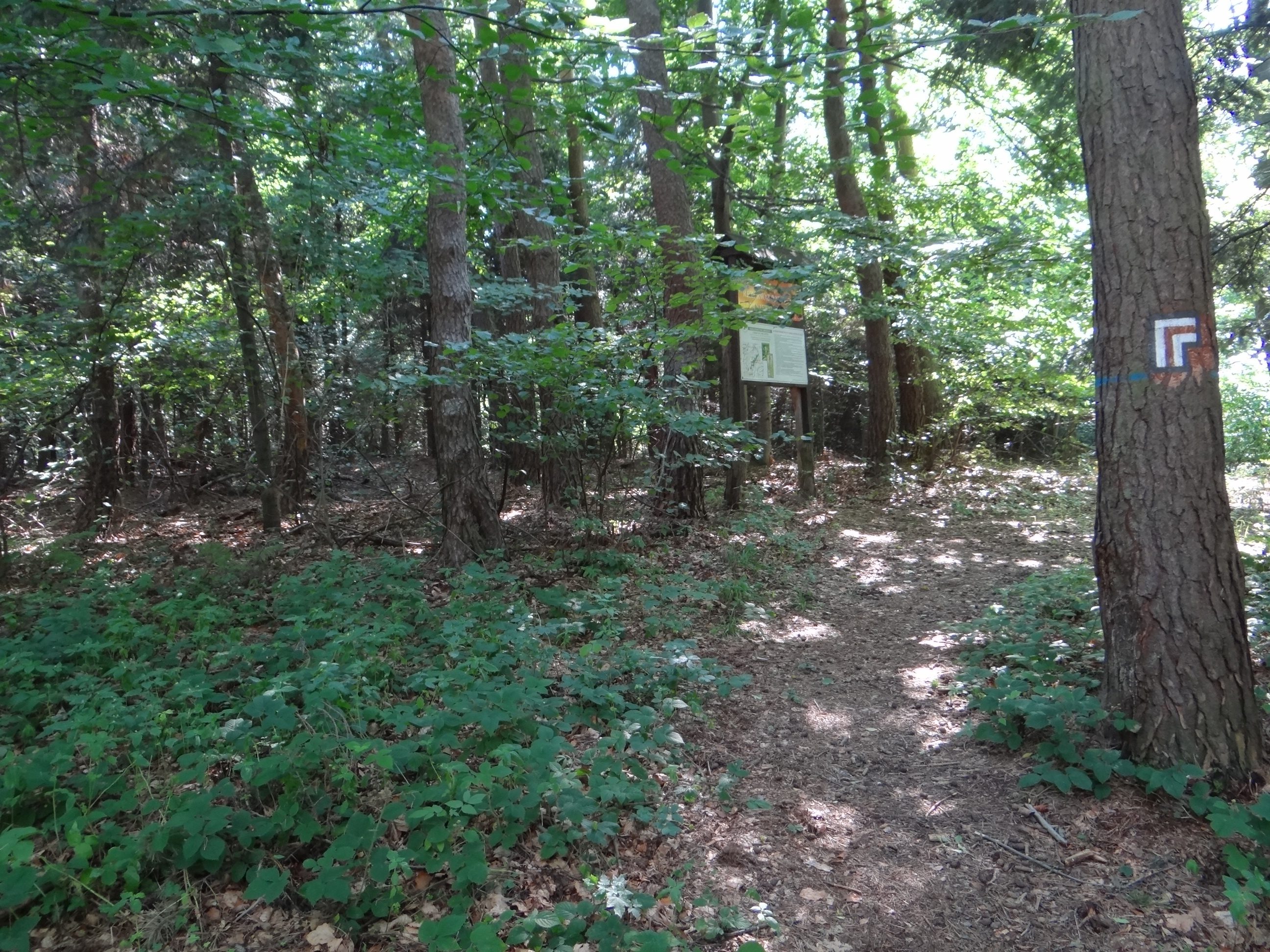
Panieńska Góra Nature Reserve

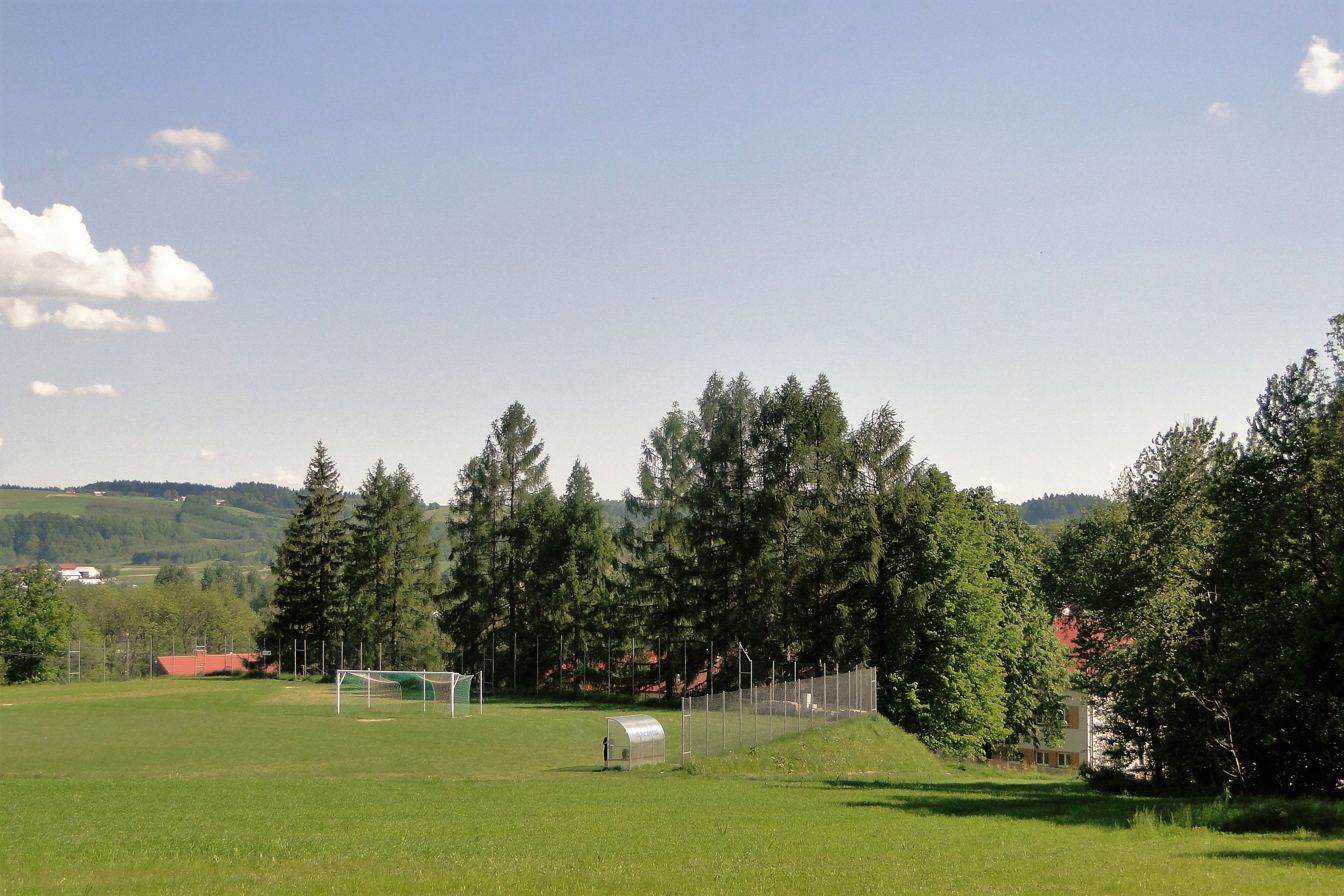
Olszyny sports fields

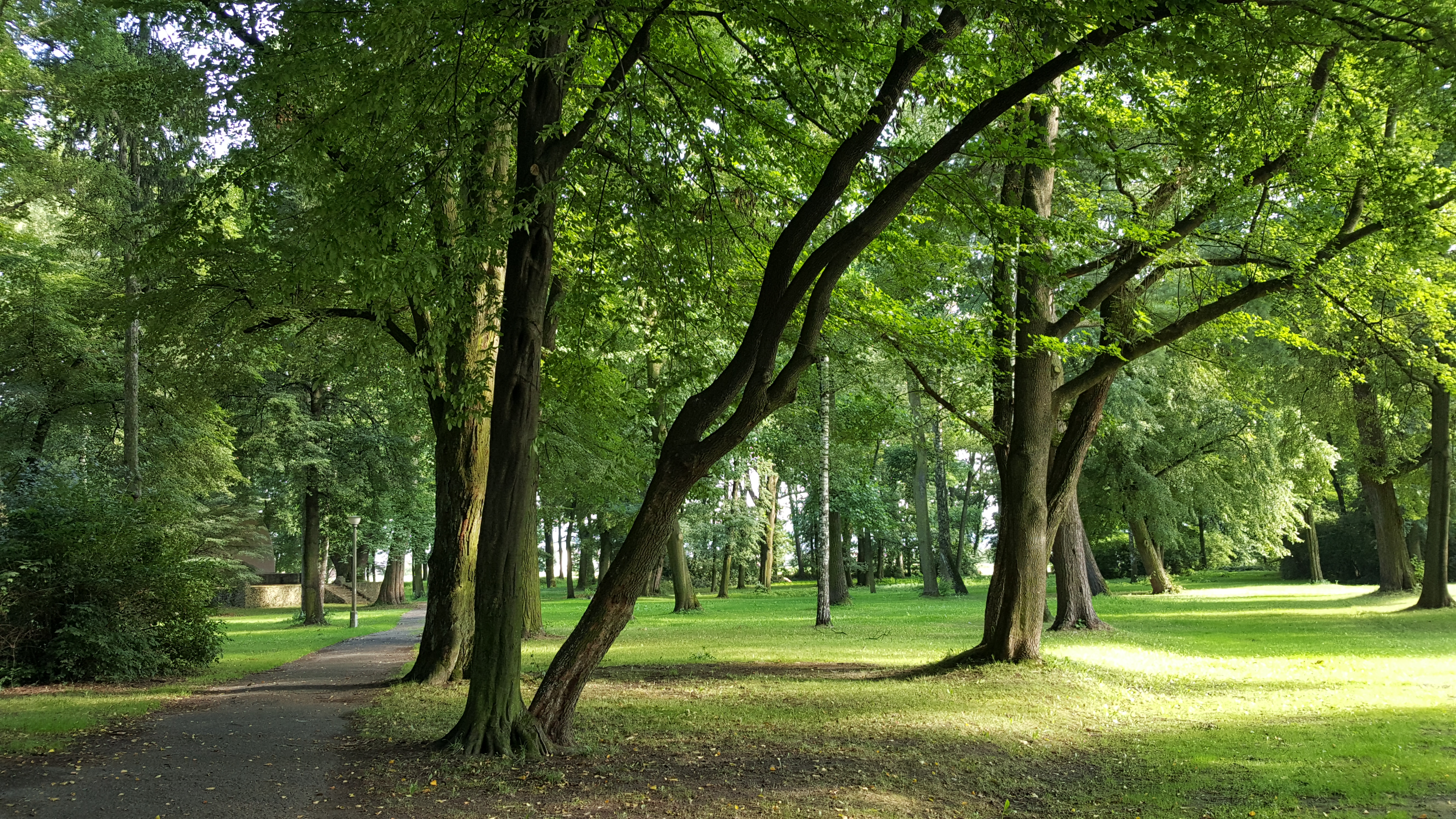
Park in Wojnicz

== Nearby municipalities ==
- Tarnów
- Brzesko
- Bochnia
- Zakliczyn
