= ISEP =

ISEP may refer to:

- Instituto Superior de Engenharia do Porto or Porto Superior Institute of Engineering, in Porto, Portugal
- Institut supérieur d'électronique de Paris, a French IT engineering university
- Indiana State Excise Police

== See also ==
- Isep, a village in Poland
