= Milówka =

Milówka can mean:

- Milówka, Silesian Voivodeship
- Milówka, Lesser Poland Voivodeship
