= Biadoliny =

Biadoliny may refer to the following places in Poland:

- Biadoliny Radłowskie
- Biadoliny Szlacheckie
