= Memorial to RAF aircrew in Dębina Zakrzowska =

Memorial to RAF aircrew in Dębina Zakrzowska, Poland
- Pomnik aliantów w Dębinie Zakrzowskiej
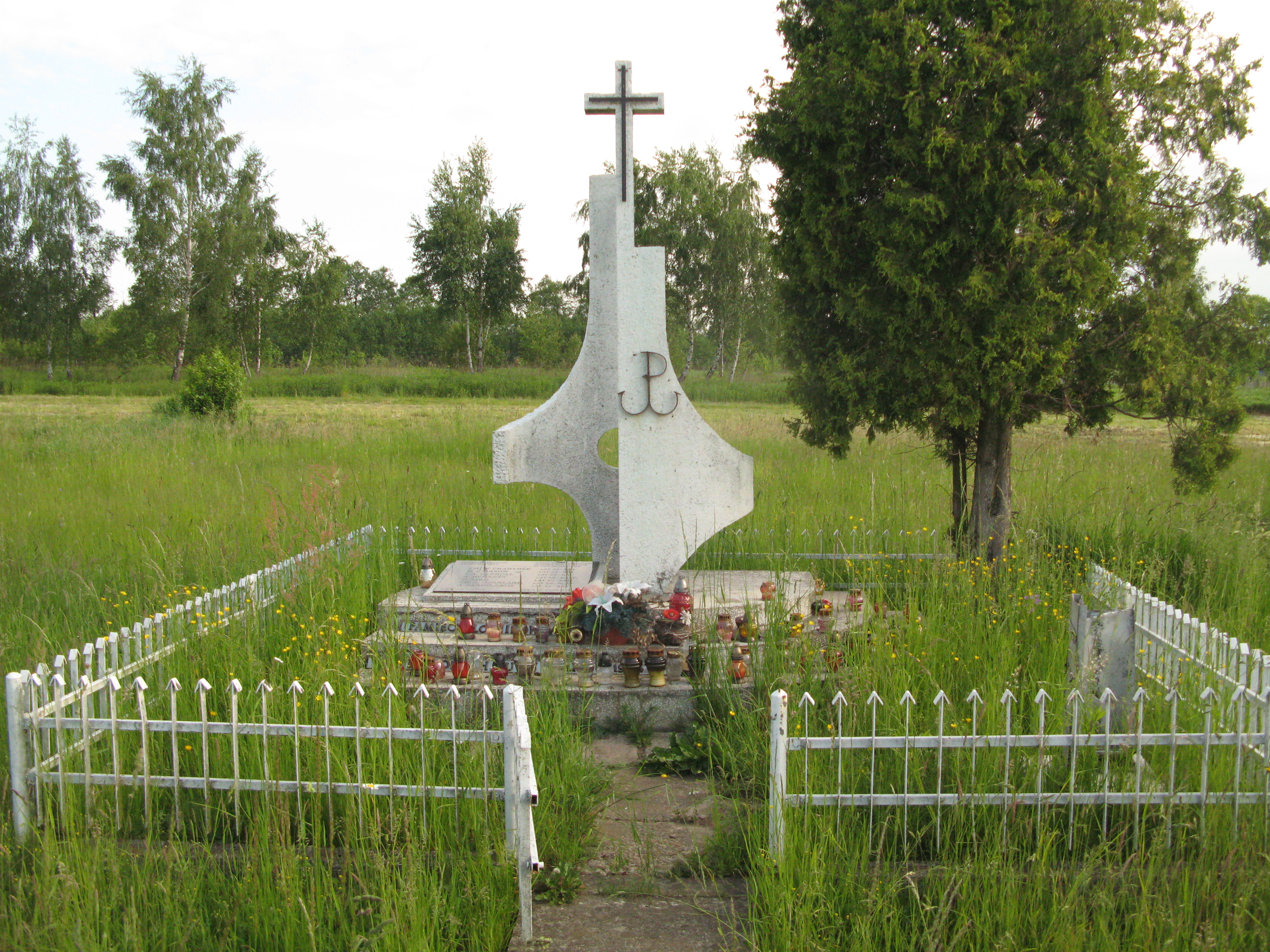
- Memorial to the fallen allied aircrew in Dębina Zakrzowska
- Interactive map of Memorial to RAF aircrew in Dębina Zakrzowska, Poland
- Location: Dębina Zakrzowska, Wojnicz Commune, Poland
- Coordinates: 49°58′06″N 20°49′47″E
- Designer: Liliana and Otto Schier
- Type: memorial
- Material: concrete, metal and stone
- Height: 2 m (6 ft 7 in)
- Completion date: August 4, 1991
- Dedicated to: RAF, RAAF and RCAF airmen who died in the plane crash

The memorial to the RAF aircrew located in the hamlet of Dębina Zakrzowska, Wojnicz Commune in southern Poland, marks the spot where the British, Canadian and Australian airmen perished on the night of 4–5 August 1944, when their Halifax bomber, from No. 148 Squadron of the RAF, was shot down by a German fighter aircraft. They were flying on a mission as part of the Warsaw airlift, to supply the Polish Home Army whose Warsaw Uprising had just begun. Owing to a change of orders, the bomber had taken off from its base in Brindisi in Italy with instructions to divert their drop to partisans in the vicinity of Miechów, rather short of the capital. The men were initially buried in the military cemetery in Wojnicz, but their bodies were subsequently exhumed for repatriation to their own countries.

The memorial, designed by Liliana and Otto Schier, is made up of a concrete plinth with two-metre high wings topped by a cross and bearing the anchor emblem of the Polish Underground State and of Our Lady of Częstochowa. It was funded and erected by the residents of Dębina and the commune of Wojnicz. It was ceremonially unveiled on 4 August 1991. The memorial rises on the crash site, in fields beyond the last farmstead on the western edge of the hamlet.

The plaque on the monument lists the names of the seven crew:

D. Aird (UK), Ch. A. Beanland (Canada), A. Bennett (Australia), J. A. Carroll (UK), Ch. W. Crabtree (UK), D. J. Mason (UK), A. Sandilands (UK),

officers and men of the RAF, the RAAF and the RCAF.

Each year, on the anniversary of the crash, the local community holds a commemoration to the fallen airmen, lighting candles and laying flowers on the memorial.

== Gallery ==
Crash site

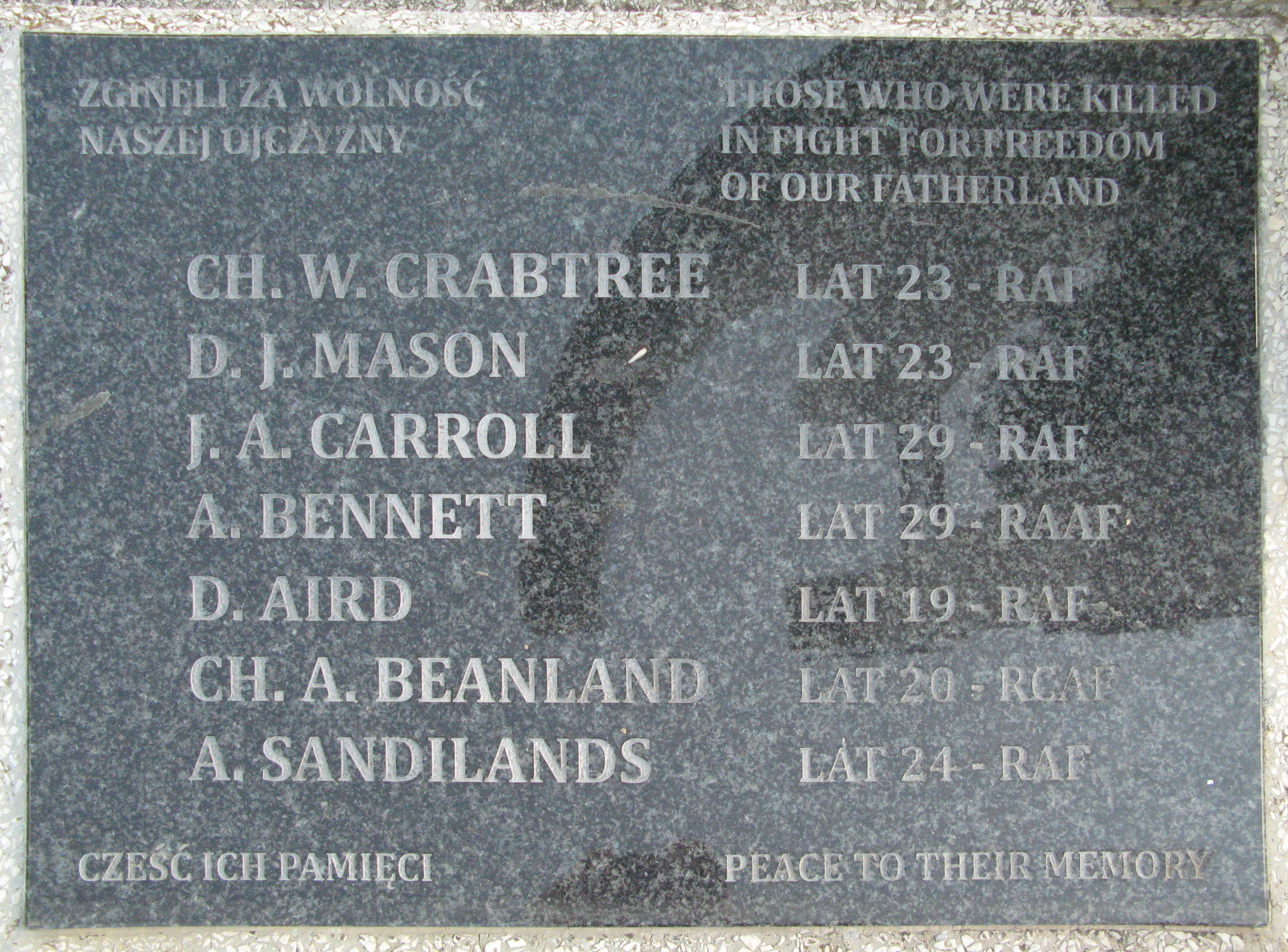
Plaque with the names and ages of the aircrew

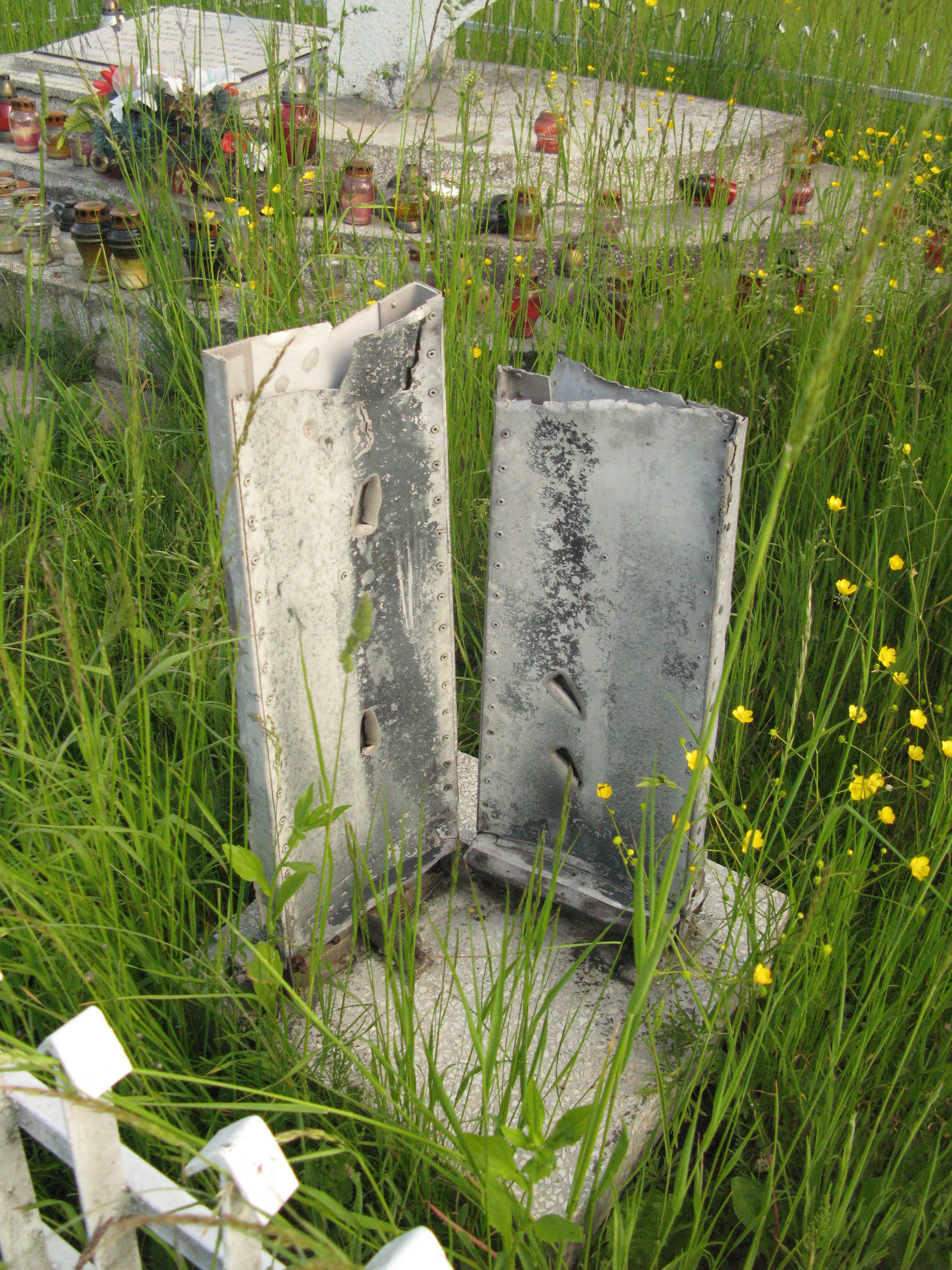
Salvaged pieces of the Halifax's wreckage

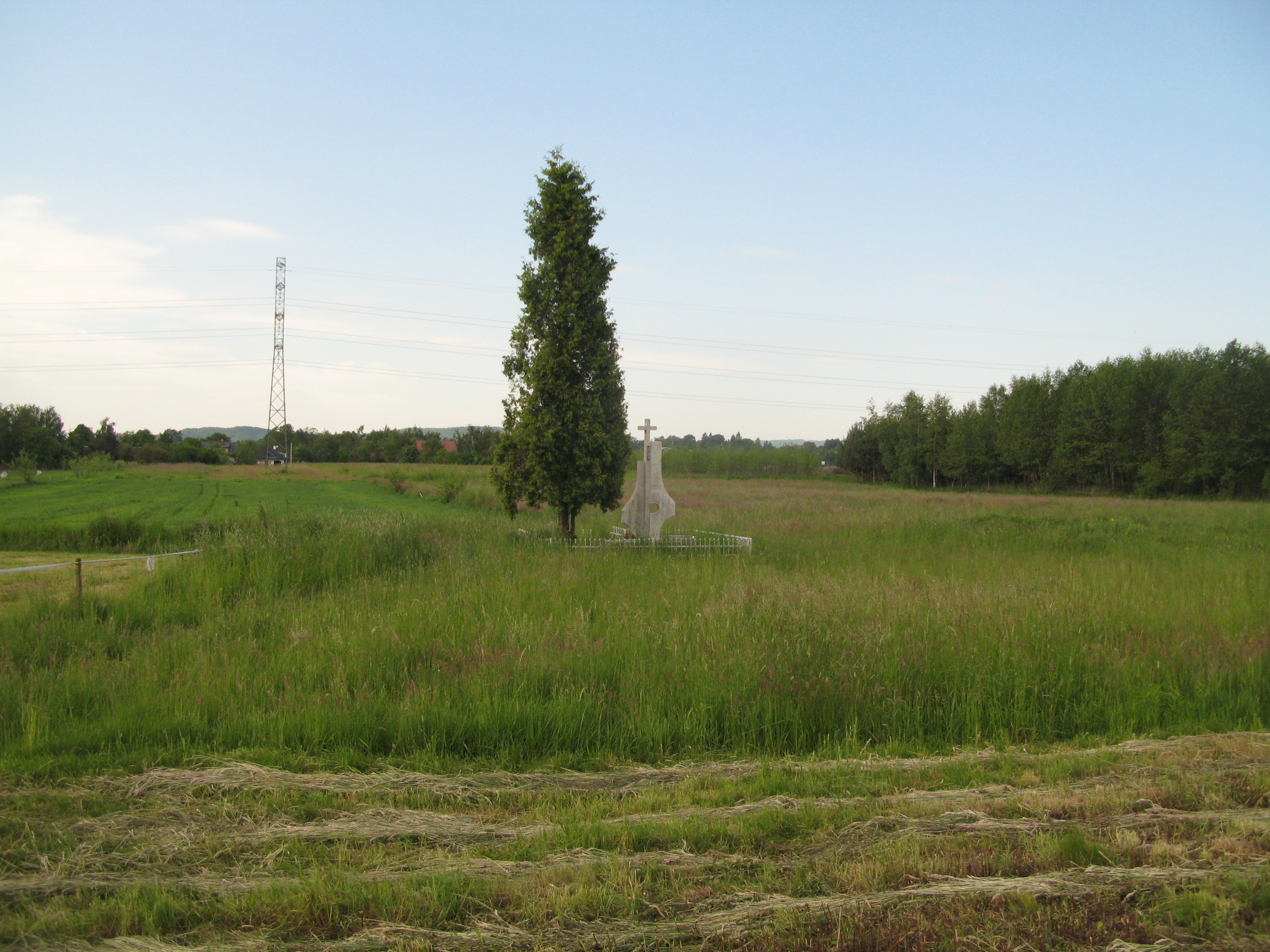
Landscape around the memorial
