= Rudka, Gmina Wojnicz =

Rudka
- Village
- Location within Poland
- Coordinates: 49°56′33″N 20°48′04″E
- Country: Poland
- Voivodeship: Lesser Poland
- County: Tarnów
- Gmina: Wojnicz

Rudka [ˈrutka] is a village in the administrative district of Gmina Wojnicz, within Tarnów County, Lesser Poland Voivodeship, in southern Poland.
