= Łukanowice =

- Village
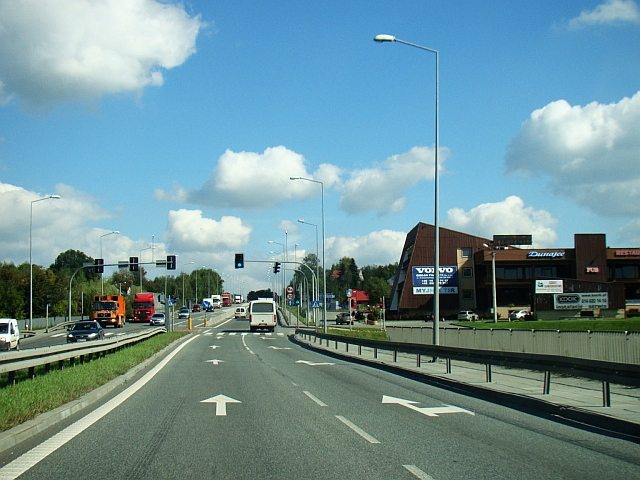

- Location within Poland
- Coordinates: 49°58′N 20°53′E
- Country: Poland
- Voivodeship: Lesser Poland
- County: Tarnów
- Gmina: Wojnicz

Łukanowice [wukanɔˈvit͡sɛ] is a village in the administrative district of Gmina Wojnicz, within Tarnów County, Lesser Poland Voivodeship, in southern Poland.
