= Łopoń =

- Village
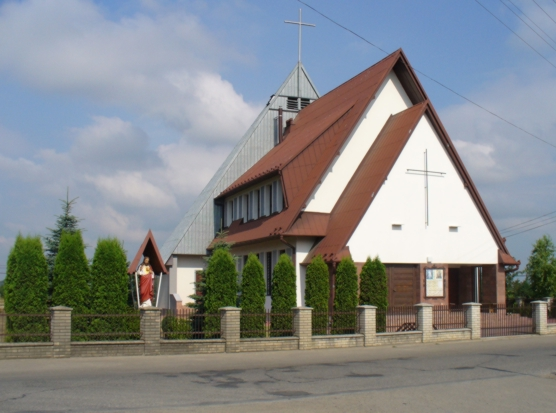
- Catholic church

- Location within Poland
- Coordinates: 49°59′N 20°47′E
- Country: Poland
- Voivodeship: Lesser Poland
- County: Tarnów
- Gmina: Wojnicz

Łopoń [ˈwɔpɔɲ] is a village in the administrative district of Gmina Wojnicz, within Tarnów County, Lesser Poland Voivodeship, in southern Poland.
