= Battle of Wojnicz =

1655 battle

Coordinates: 49°58′00″N 20°50′00″E

- Part of the Northern War of 1655–1660 and The Deluge
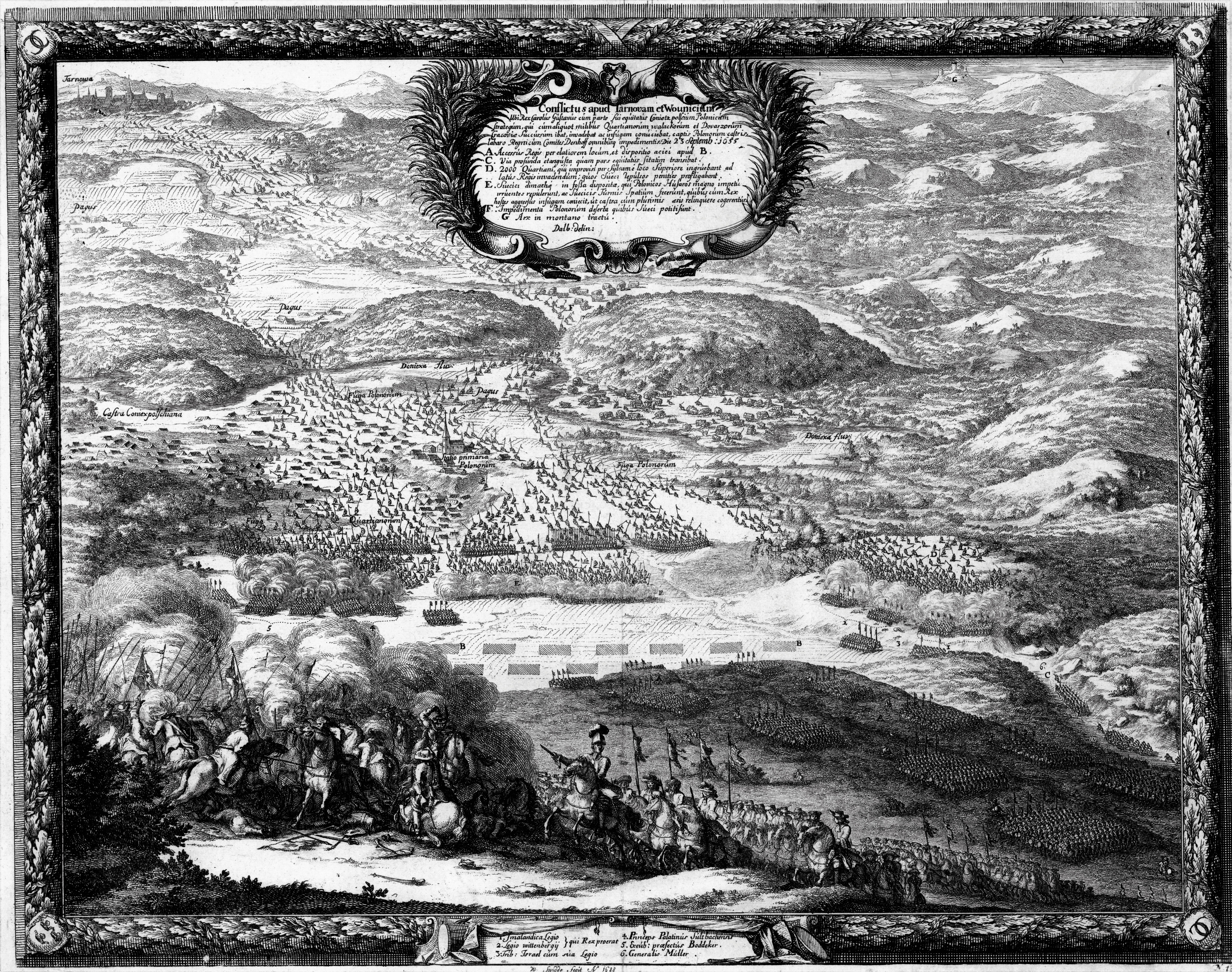
- Conflictus apud Tarnovam et Wounicium Ubi Rex Carolus Gustavus cum parte Sui equitatus, Conietzpolscium Polonicum Die 23 septemb 1655 by Erik Dahlbergh
Date	October 3, 1655
Location	Wojnicz
Result	Swedish victory

Belligerents
Swedish Empire	Polish–Lithuanian Commonwealth

Commanders and leaders
(Swedish Empire) Charles X Gustav	(Polish–Lithuanian Commonwealth) Stanisław Lanckoroński (Polish–Lithuanian Commonwealth) Stanisław Rewera Potocki

Units involved
Müllers Reiter; Smålands Reiter; Wittenbergs Reiter; Berndes Dragoons; Yxkulls Reiter; Sulzbachs Reiter; Böddekers Reiter; Pretlachs Reiter; Ridderhielms Reiter	Stanisław Lanckoroński's Banner; Władysław Myszkowski's Banner; Adam Działyński's Banner; Denhoff's Regiment; Hetman Lanckoroński's Banner; Alexander Koniecpolski's Banner

Strength
3,600–5,700	6,300–8,000

The Battle of Wojnicz was fought around the medieval town of Wojnicz in Lesser Poland as part of the Second Northern War on October 3, 1655, between forces of the Polish–Lithuanian Commonwealth commanded by Field Crown Hetman Stanisław Lanckoroński and Great Crown Hetman Stanisław Rewera Potocki on one side, and on the other, the invading Swedish forces commanded by King Charles X Gustav. The battle ended in a Swedish victory.

== Background ==
In the early stages of the Siege of Kraków, the Polish royal units of Hetman Lanckoronski decided to abandon the city, as the situation of the defenders was hopeless. Together with king Jan Kazimierz, the Poles headed eastwards, to the city of Tarnów. The king with the royal court had then turned southwards, towards Nowy Wiśnicz and Nowy Sącz, leaving the army of Lanckoroński to join units under Hetman Potocki by the ancient market town of Wojnicz.

Swedish king Charles Gustav, who commanded the siege of Kraków, decided to chase the Poles, leaving Arvid Wittenberg with 8,000 soldiers in Krakow. Charles Gustav had app. 5,000 soldiers, mostly infantry, while the Polish units were more numerous, including the hussars under Aleksander Koniecpolski. The Poles were camped in the hills above Wojnicz, on the Dunajec river.

== Battle ==
Due to poor visibility, the Swedes sent two cavalry regiments for reconnaissance. The regiments clashed with the Polish cavalry, which had been sent on a similar mission. The skirmish turned into a full-scale battle, which took place inside the Polish camp, among its tents. Charles Gustav quickly sent reinforcements, attacking the wings of the Polish cavalry. Under pressure from disciplined Swedish musketeers and their firepower, the hussars, who were an elite force of the Polish army, had to retreat beyond the river Dunajec. Stanislaw Lanckoronski narrowly escaped death.

The battle was another Polish failure and resonated profoundly across the Commonwealth. In nearby Tarnów, where the Polish forces had fled, thousands of soldiers switched sides and joined Charles Gustav. Among them were Dymitr Wisniowiecki, Aleksander Koniecpolski and Jan Sobieski, the future Polish king, who hoped that the Swedes would help Poland in the never-ending wars in the east.

== Swedish units ==
1. Kungliga hästgardet (400) or Müllers Reiter
2. Smålands Reiter (800)
3. Wittenbergs Reiter (600)
4. Dismounted Dragoon (Berndes Dragoon) and Commanded Musketeers (?) (700)
5. Yxkulls Reiter (550)
6. Sulzbachs Reiter (650)
7. Böddekers Reiter (550)
8. Pretlachs Reiter (850)
9. Ridderhielms Reiter (600)

== Polish units ==
A. Lanckoroński - 2,600 Cossack (pancerni) cavalry B. Wisniowiecki - 400 hussars and C. Koniecpolski - 2,600 Cossack cavalry D. Denhoff - 460 dismounted dragoons in a fortified camp

Polish Hussars -

- Hetman Stanisław Lanckoroński's Banner
- Władysław Myszkowski's Banner
- Adam Działyński's Banner

Cossack Cavalry -

- Approximately 70 banners

Dragoons -

- Col. Denhoff's Regiment
- Hetman Lanckoroński's Banner
- Alexander Koniecpolski's Banner
