= Dębina Zakrzowska =

- Village
- Location within Poland
- Coordinates: 49°58′27″N 20°50′26″E
- Country: Poland
- Voivodeship: Lesser Poland
- County: Tarnów
- Gmina: Wojnicz

Dębina Zakrzowska [dɛmˈbina zaˈkʂɔfska] is a village in the administrative district of Gmina Wojnicz, within Tarnów County, Lesser Poland Voivodeship, in southern Poland.

== See also ==
- Monument to the Allies in Dębina Zakrzowska
