= Grabno, Lesser Poland Voivodeship =

Grabno
- Village
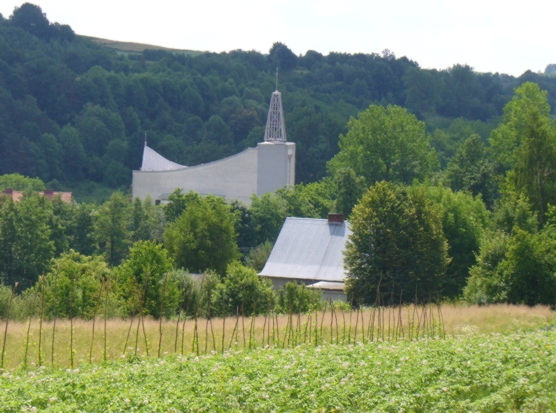

- Location within Poland
- Coordinates: 49°55′N 20°46′E
- Country: Poland
- Voivodeship: Lesser Poland
- County: Tarnów
- Gmina: Wojnicz
- Elevation: 245 m (804 ft)
- Population: 1,324

Grabno [ˈɡrabnɔ] is a village in the administrative district of Gmina Wojnicz, within Tarnów County, Lesser Poland Voivodeship, in southern Poland.
