= Więckowice, Tarnów County =

Więckowice
- Village
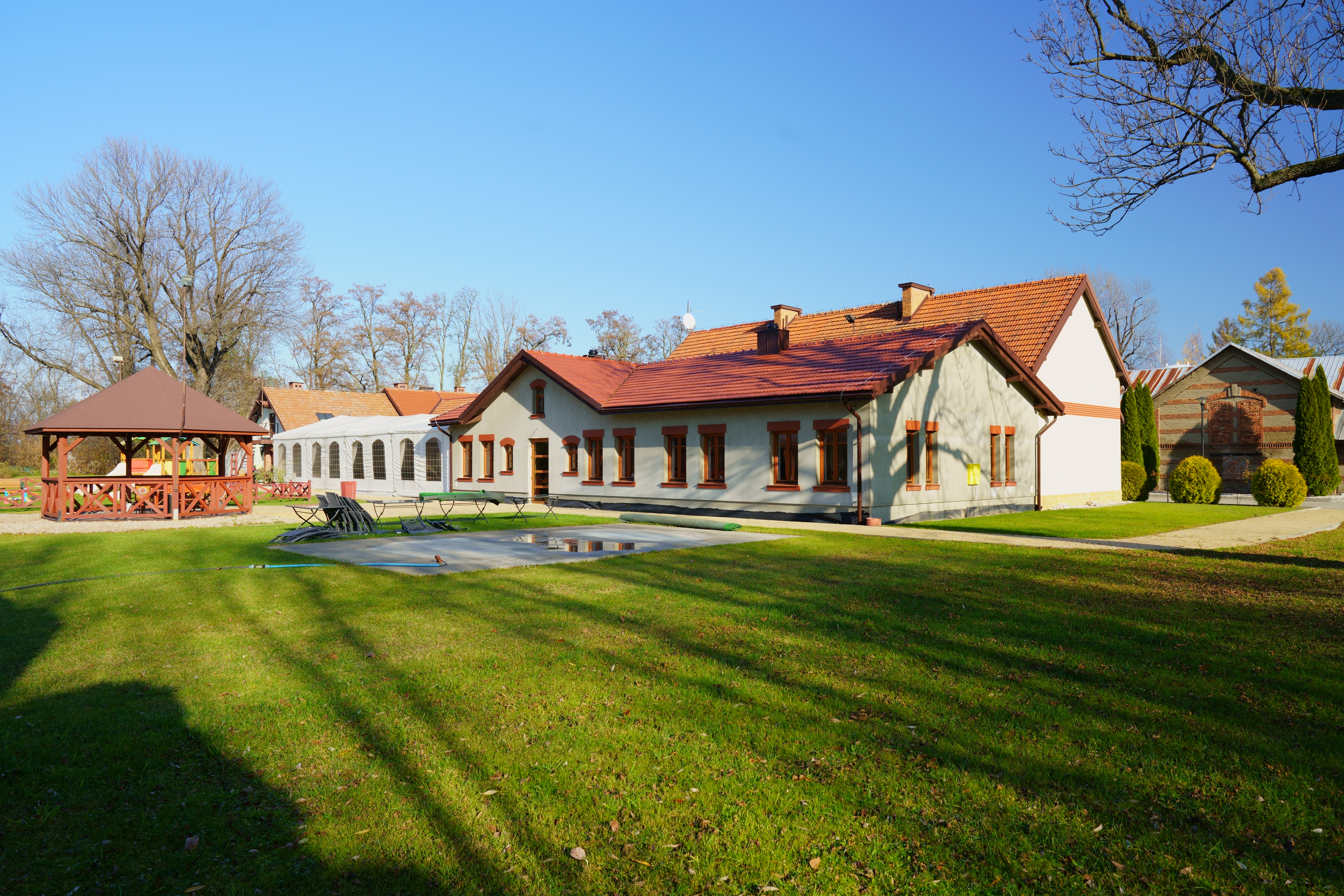

- Location within Poland
- Coordinates: 49°56′N 20°49′E
- Country: Poland
- Voivodeship: Lesser Poland
- County: Tarnów
- Gmina: Wojnicz
- Population: 540

Więckowice [vjɛnt͡skɔˈvit͡sɛ] is a village in the administrative district of Gmina Wojnicz, within Tarnów County, Lesser Poland Voivodeship, in southern Poland.
