= Sukmanie =

- Village
- Location within Poland
- Coordinates: 49°54′N 20°49′E
- Country: Poland
- Voivodeship: Lesser Poland
- County: Tarnów
- Gmina: Wojnicz

Sukmanie [sukˈmaɲɛ] is a village in the administrative district of Gmina Wojnicz, within Tarnów County, Lesser Poland Voivodeship, in southern Poland.
