= Zakrzów, Tarnów County =

Zakrzów
- Village
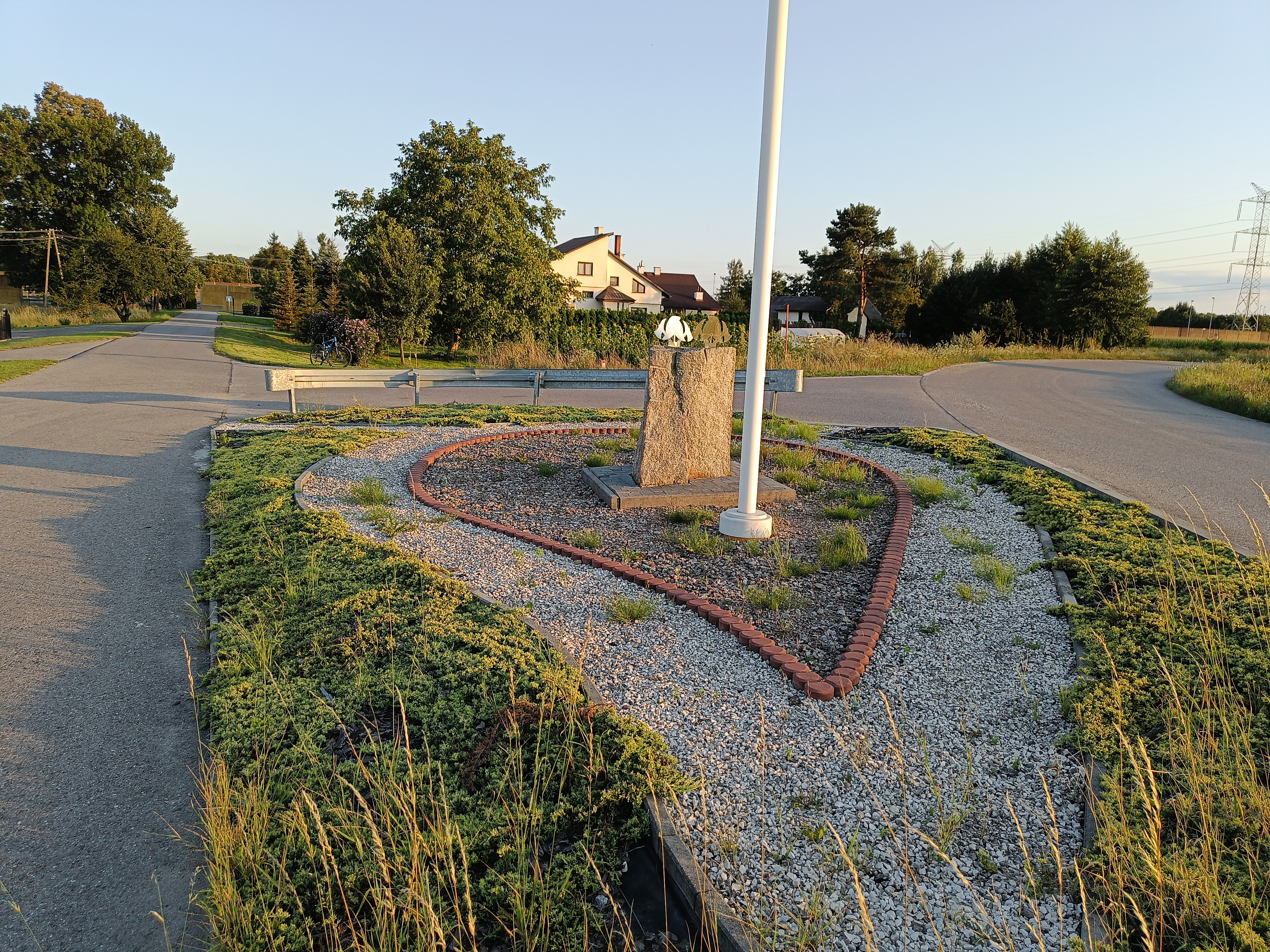

- Location within Poland
- Coordinates: 49°58′N 20°51′E
- Country: Poland
- Voivodeship: Lesser Poland
- County: Tarnów
- Gmina: Wojnicz
- Population (approx.): 400

Zakrzów [ˈzakʂuf] is a village in the administrative district of Gmina Wojnicz, within Tarnów County, Lesser Poland Voivodeship, in southern Poland.

The village has an approximate population of 400.
