= Wielka Wieś, Tarnów County =

Wielka Wieś
- Village
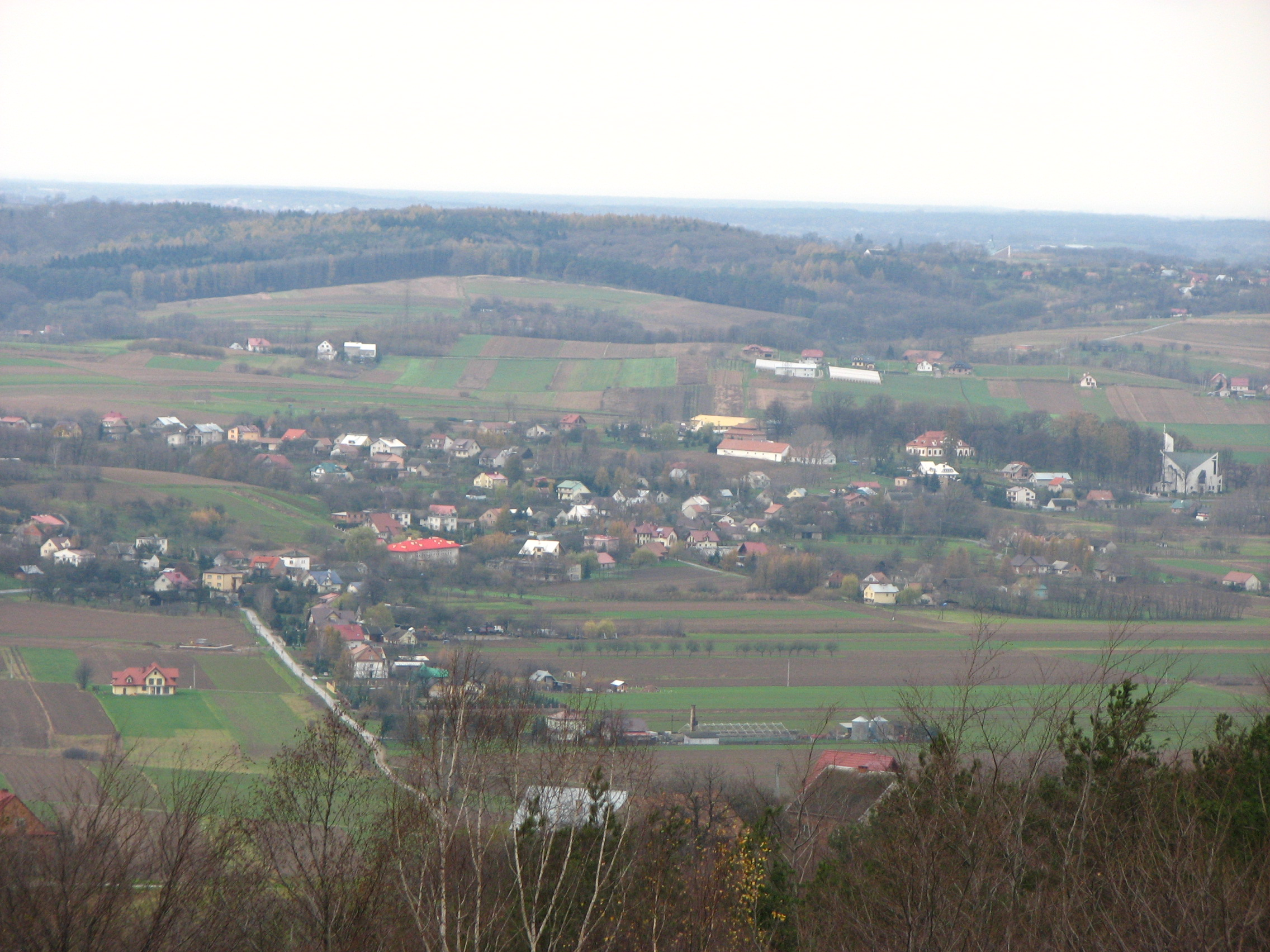

- Location within Poland
- Coordinates: 49°56′N 20°49′E
- Country: Poland
- Voivodeship: Lesser Poland
- County: Tarnów
- Gmina: Wojnicz

Wielka Wieś [ˈvjɛlka ˈvjɛɕ] is a village in the administrative district of Gmina Wojnicz, within Tarnów County, Lesser Poland Voivodeship, in southern Poland.
