= Milówka, Lesser Poland Voivodeship =

Milówka
- Village
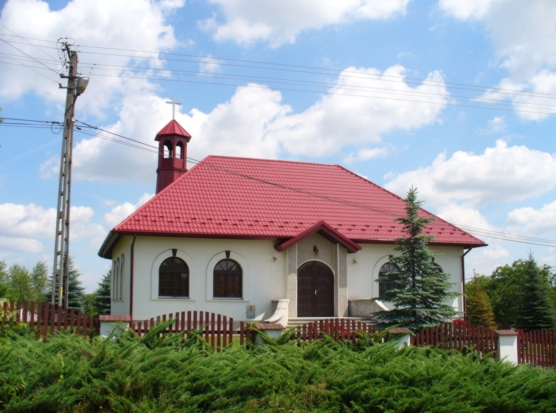
- Church in Milówka

- Location within Poland
- Coordinates: 49°55′10″N 20°47′25″E
- Country: Poland
- Voivodeship: Lesser Poland
- County: Tarnów
- Gmina: Wojnicz

Population
  - Total: 690
- Website: http://www.republika.pl/milowka_wies/

Milówka [miˈlufka] is a village in the administrative district of Gmina Wojnicz, within Tarnów County, Lesser Poland Voivodeship, in southern Poland.
