= Olszyny, Gmina Wojnicz =

Olszyny
- Village
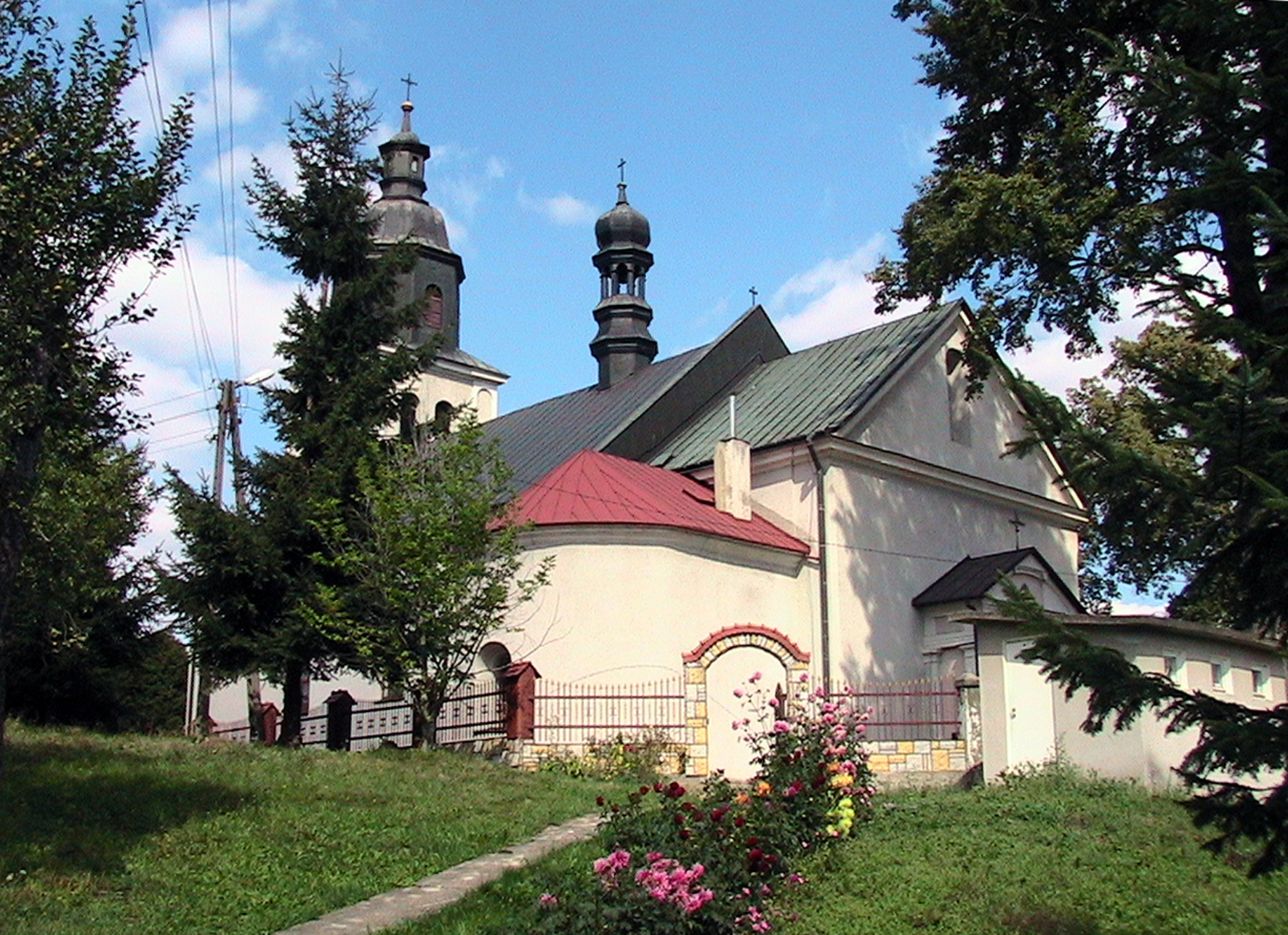
- Church of the Name of the Blessed Virgin Mary

- Location within Poland
- Coordinates: 49°53′N 20°49′E
- Country: Poland
- Voivodeship: Lesser Poland
- County: Tarnów
- Gmina: Wojnicz

Olszyny [ɔlˈʂɨnɨ] is a village in the administrative district of Gmina Wojnicz, within Tarnów County, Lesser Poland Voivodeship, in southern Poland.
