= Gmina Wojnicz =

Gmina Wojnicz Wojnicz Commune
- Gmina
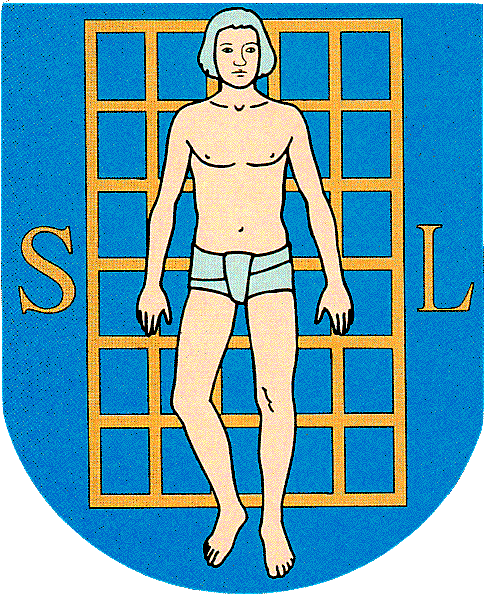
- Coat of arms
- Interactive map of Gmina Wojnicz
- Coordinates (Wojnicz): 49°58′N 20°50′E
- Country: Poland
- Voivodeship: Lesser Poland
- County: Tarnów County
- Seat: Wojnicz

Area
  - Total: 78.55 km^{2} (30.33 sq mi)

Population (2006)
  - Total: 13,019
  - Density: 165.7/km^{2} (429.3/sq mi)
  - Urban: 3,404
  - Rural: 9,615
- Website: http://www.wojnicz.pl

Gmina Wojnicz is an urban-rural gmina (administrative district) in Tarnów County, Lesser Poland Voivodeship, in southern Poland. Its seat is the town of Wojnicz, which lies approximately 15 kilometres (9 mi) south-west of Tarnów and 65 km (40 mi) east of the regional capital Kraków.

The gmina covers an area of 78.55 square kilometres (30.3 sq mi), and as of 2006 its total population is 13,019 (out of which the population of Wojnicz amounts to 3,404, and the population of the rural part of the gmina is 9,615).

== Villages ==
Apart from the town of Wojnicz, Gmina Wojnicz contains the villages and settlements of Biadoliny Radłowskie, Dębina Łętowska, Dębina Zakrzowska, Grabno, Isep, Łopoń, Łukanowice, Milówka, Olszyny, Rudka, Sukmanie, Więckowice, Wielka Wieś and Zakrzów.

== Neighbouring gminas ==
Gmina Wojnicz is bordered by the gminas of Borzęcin, Dębno, Pleśna, Tarnów, Wierzchosławice, Wietrzychowice and Zakliczyn.

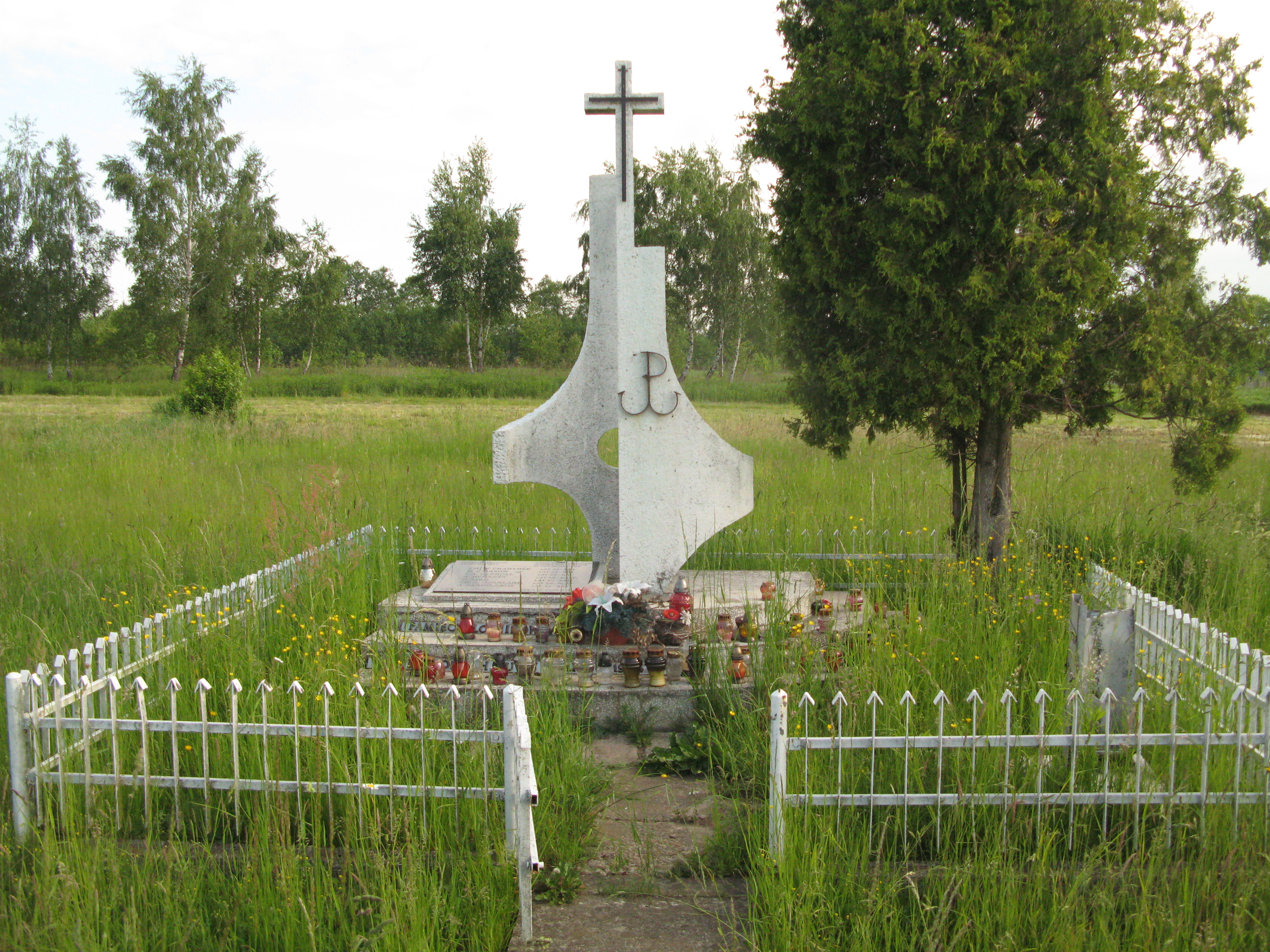
Memorial to fallen RAF, RAAF and RCAF airmen in Debina Zakrzowska
