= Kąśna =

Kąśna may refer to the following places in Poland:

- Kąśna Dolna
- Kąśna Górna
