= Pławna =

Pławna may refer to the following places in Poland:

- Pławna, Lower Silesian Voivodeship (south-west Poland)
- Pławna, Lesser Poland Voivodeship (south Poland)
