= Ciężkowice =

Town in Lesser Poland Voivodeship, Poland

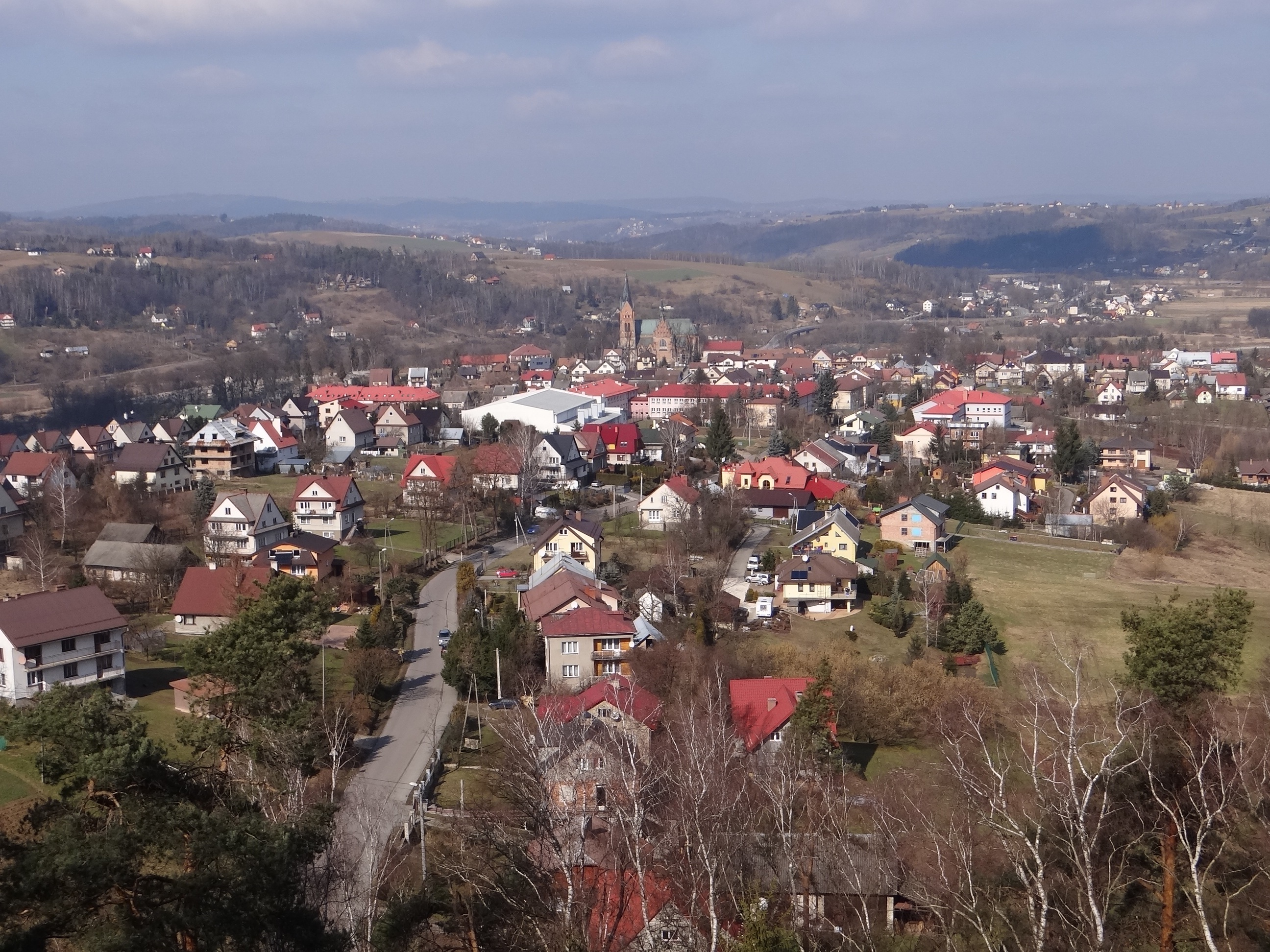
- Panorama of the town

- Coat of arms

- Location within Poland
- Coordinates: 49°48′N 20°58′E
- Country: Poland
- Voivodeship: Lesser Poland
- County: Tarnów
- Gmina: Ciężkowice
- First mentioned: 1125
- Town rights: 1348-1934, 1998

Government
  - Mayor: Jowita Jurkiewicz-Drąg (PSL)

Area
  - Total: 9.99 km^{2} (3.86 sq mi)

Population (31 December 2021)
  - Total: 2,444
  - Density: 245/km^{2} (634/sq mi)
- Time zone: UTC+1 (CET)
  - Summer (DST): UTC+2 (CEST)
- Postal code: 33-190
- Area code: +48 14
- Car plates: KTA
- Website: http://www.ciezkowice.pl

Ciężkowice [t͡ɕɛ̃ʂkɔˈvʲit͡sɛ] is a town in Tarnów County, Lesser Poland Voivodeship, in southern Poland, with 2,444 inhabitants as of December 2021. It lies in the Ciężkowice Foothills, on the Biała river. The town is located on regional road nr. 977, it also has a rail station (Bogoniowice - Ciężkowice), on a line which goes from Tarnów to the Slovak border crossing at Leluchów.

== History ==
The history of Ciężkowice dates back to the year 1125, when in a document of Papal legate Gilles de Paris, the village is mentioned as a property of the Tyniec Benedictine Abbey. On February 29, 1348, King Casimir III the Great granted it Magdeburg rights town charter. At that time, Ciężkowice was partly inhabited by the German settlers. In the late Middle Ages, Ciężkowice was located on a merchant route from the Kingdom of Hungary to Kraków. Weekly fairs took place here every Wednesday, where local dairy products, clothes, salt, horses and Hungarian wines were sold. In 1358, St. Andrew parish church was built.

After the Swedish invasion of Poland, Ciężkowice lost its importance. Until 1772 (see Partitions of Poland), the town belonged to Sandomierz Voivodeship. From 1772 to late 1918, it was part of Austrian Galicia. The decline of Ciężkowice was so severe that in 1934, the government of the Second Polish Republic stripped it of the town charter, and Ciężkowice remained a village until 1998. Following the German-Soviet invasion of Poland, which started World War II in September 1939, Ciężkowice was occupied by Germany.

== Points of interest ==
- Nature Museum of Krystyna and Włodzimierz Tomek, with a collection of birds and insects,
- neo-Gothic St. Andrew church, with an Ecce Homo painting, presented to the town by Pope Innocent XI,
- Classicist town hall in the market square,
- wooden houses in the market square, typical of the Carpathian Foothills,
- St. Florian monument (patron saint of the town), in the market square,
- several roadside chapels,
- World War I military cemeteries nr. 137, 138,139 and 140,
- Ignacy Jan Paderewski manor house with a spacious park, located on the other side of the Biala river, in the village of Kąśna Dolna. The manor house was built in the early 19th century, and in 1897, it was remodelled by its new owner, Ignacy Jan Paderewski, who in 1903 sold it to Helena and Wlodzimierz Kodrębski. Currently, it houses the Paderewski Center.

== Stone Town Nature Reserve ==
Stone Town Nature Reserve (known in Polish as Rezerwat przyrody Skamieniałe Miasto) is located on the right bank of the Biała river, near Ciężkowice. It has the area of 15 hectares, and it was created in 1931, with official recognition in 1974. The reserve spreads from the Biała valley to the peak of the Skała hill (367 meters above sea level). Among oak and pine forest there are several large sandstone rocks, shaped during the process of erosion. Altogether, they make the so-called stone town, and names of individual rocks are based on their appearance (“Pyramid”, “Witch”, “Town Hall”, “Club”). There also is a small waterfall nearby.

== Sports ==
Ciężkowice is home to a sports club Ciężkowianka, founded in 1948.

== Gallery ==
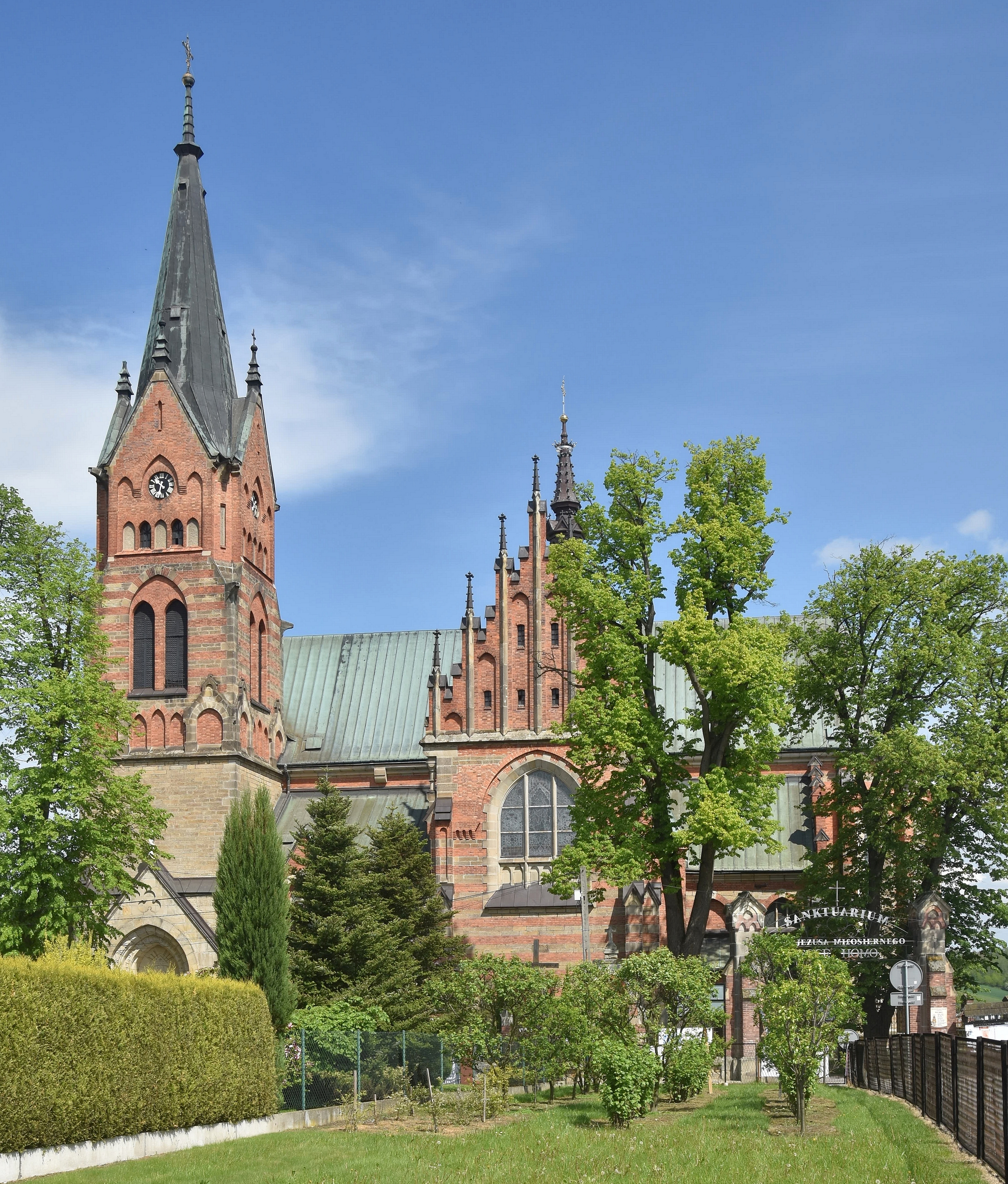
St. Andrew the Apostle Church

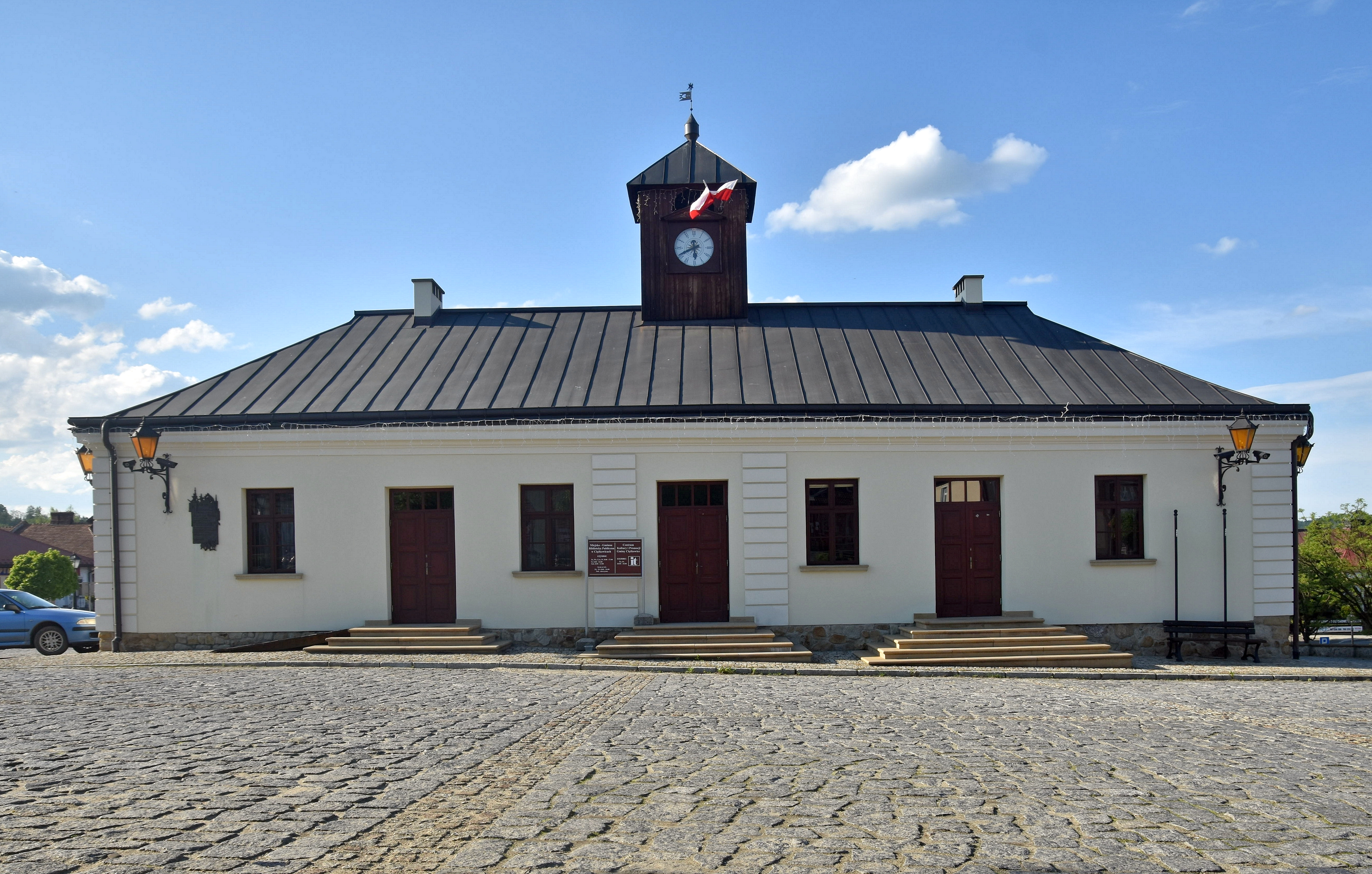
Town hall

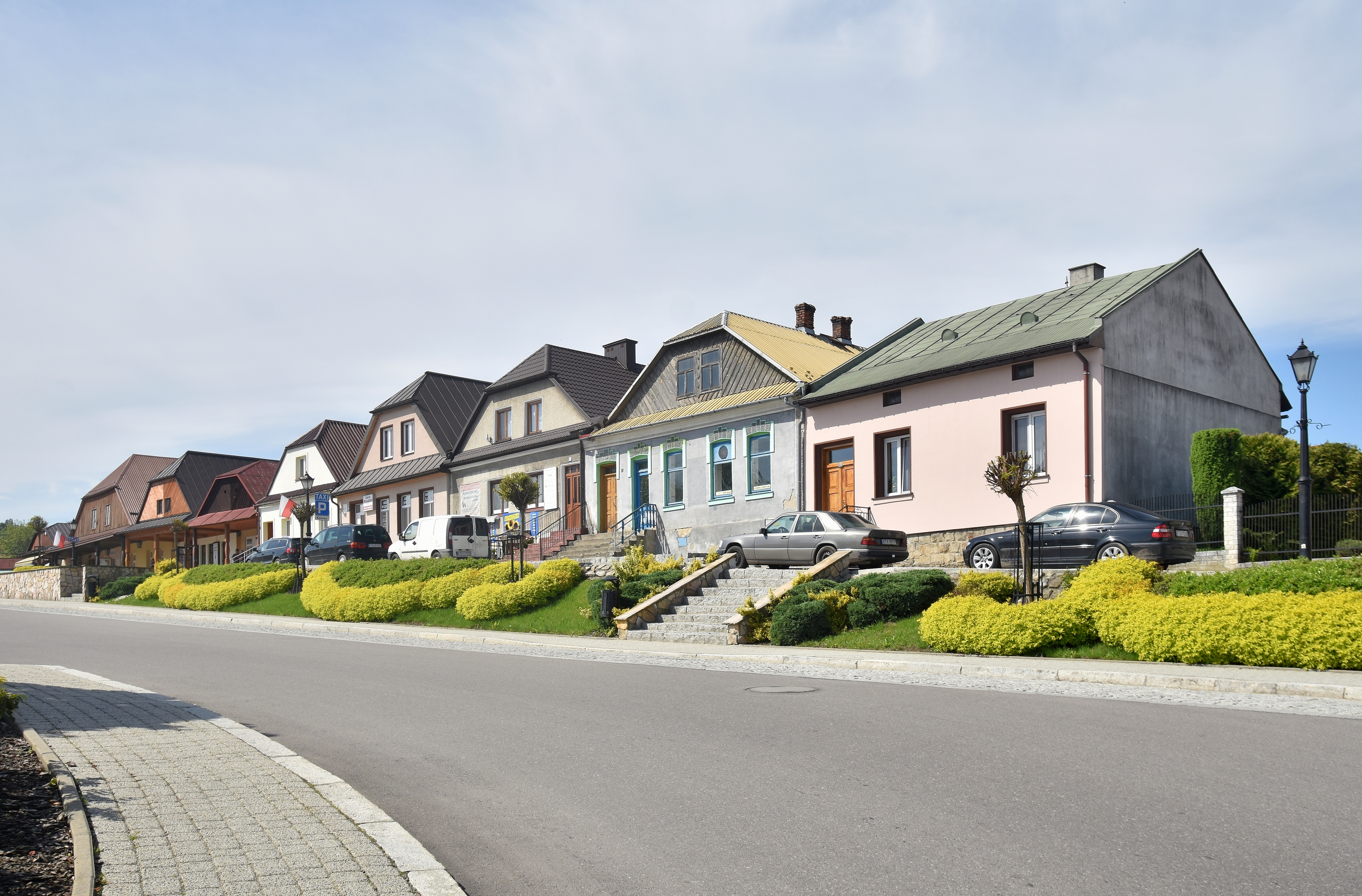
Market square

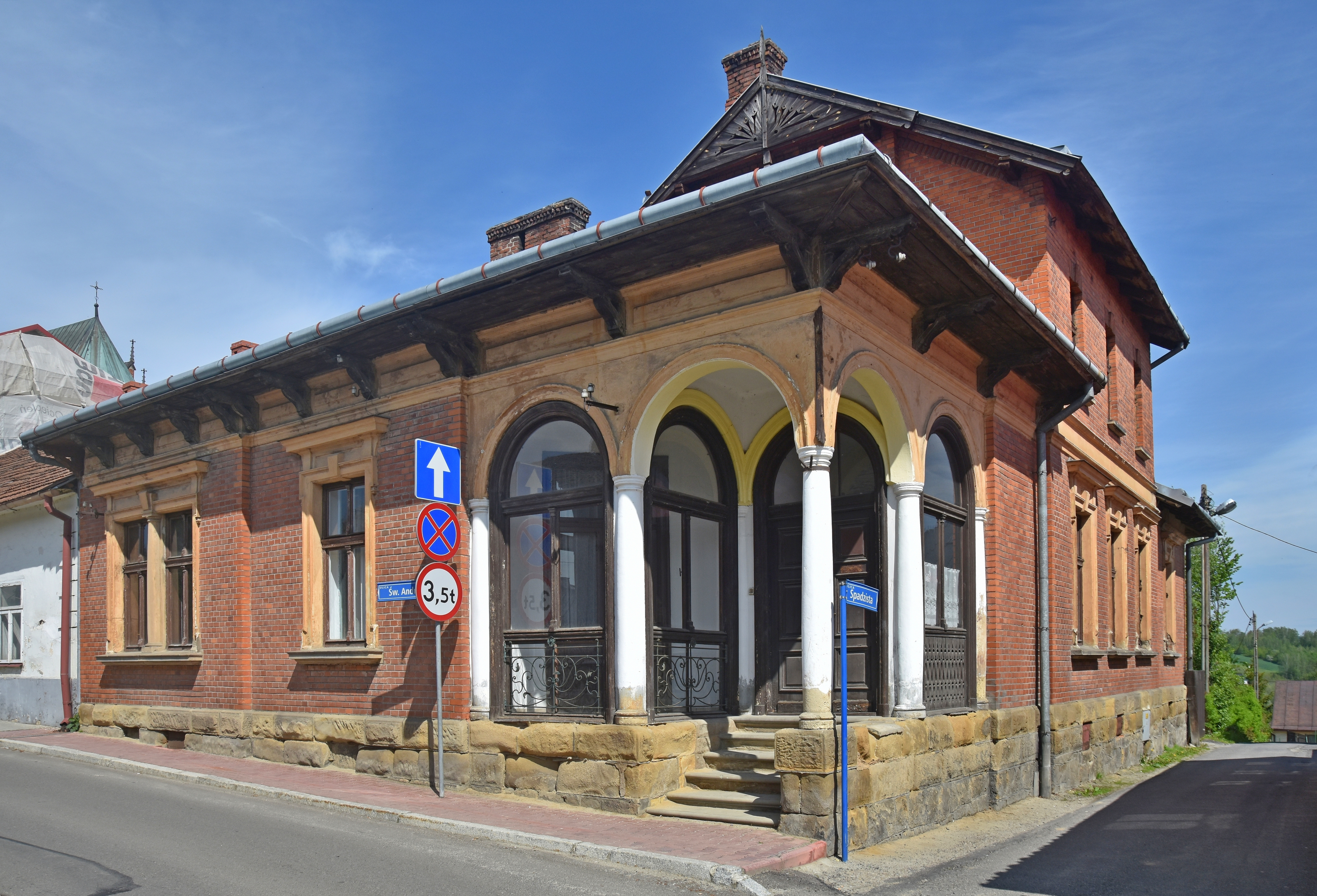
Historic building in the town centre

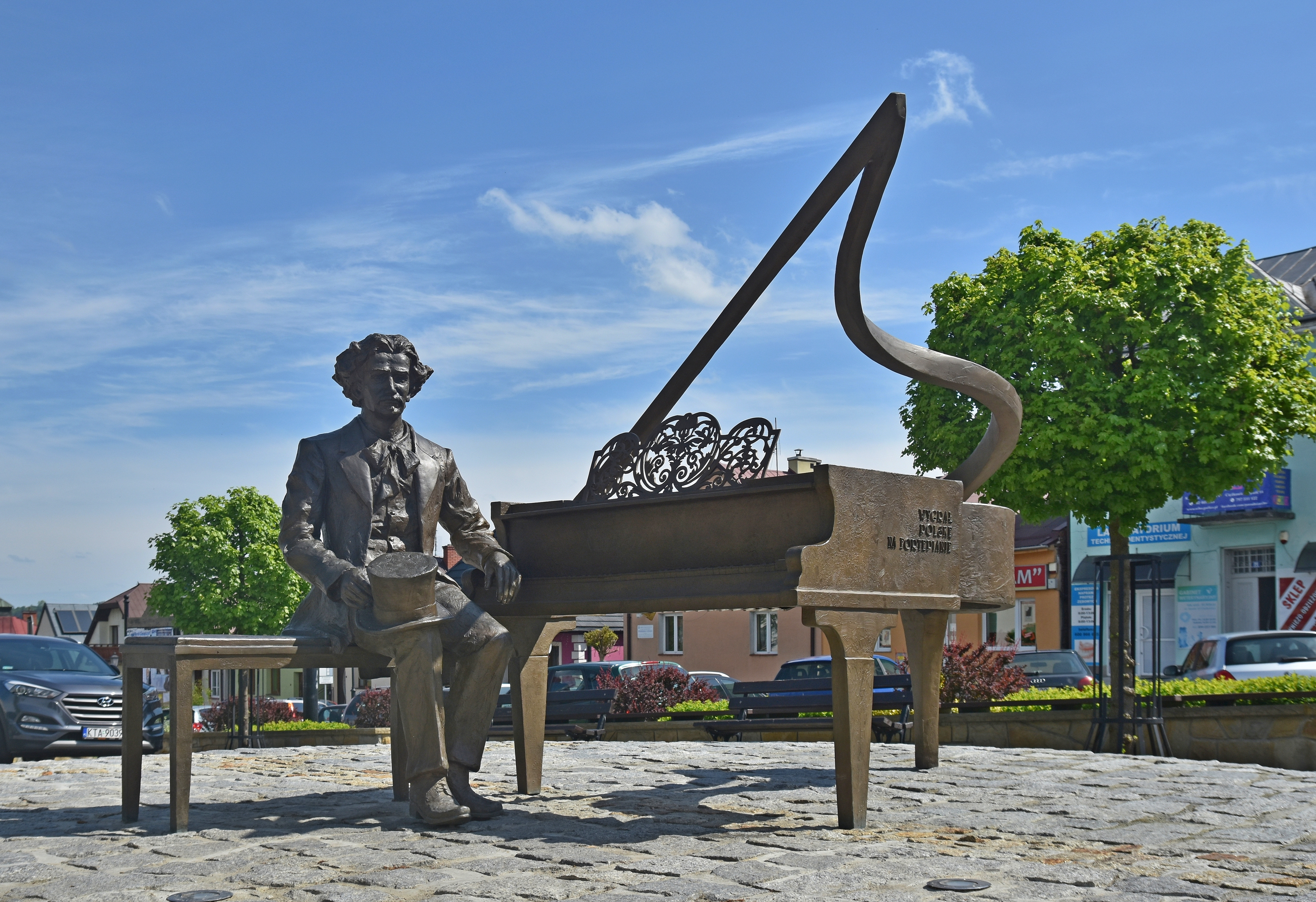
Ignacy Jan Paderewski monument

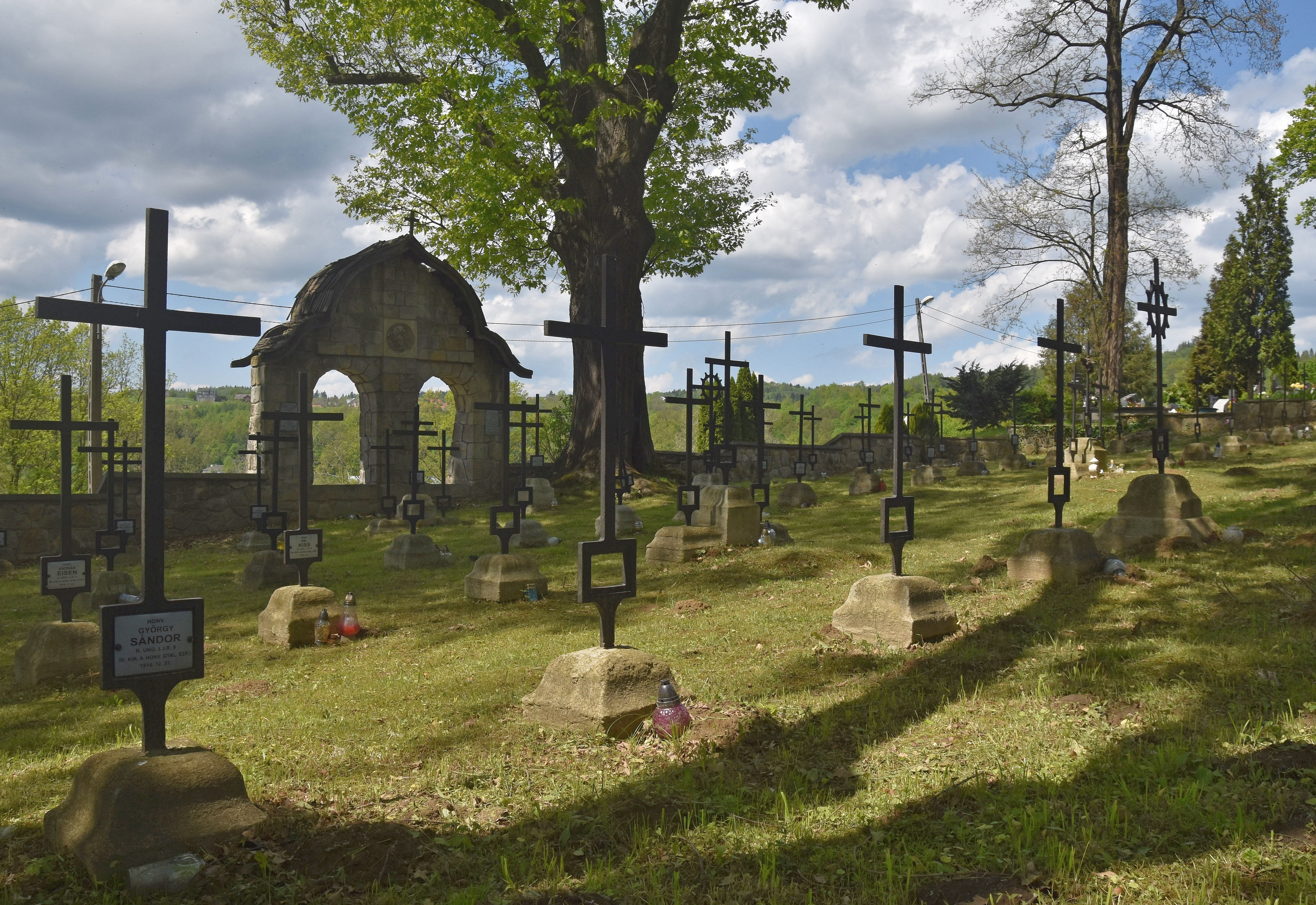
Military cemetery

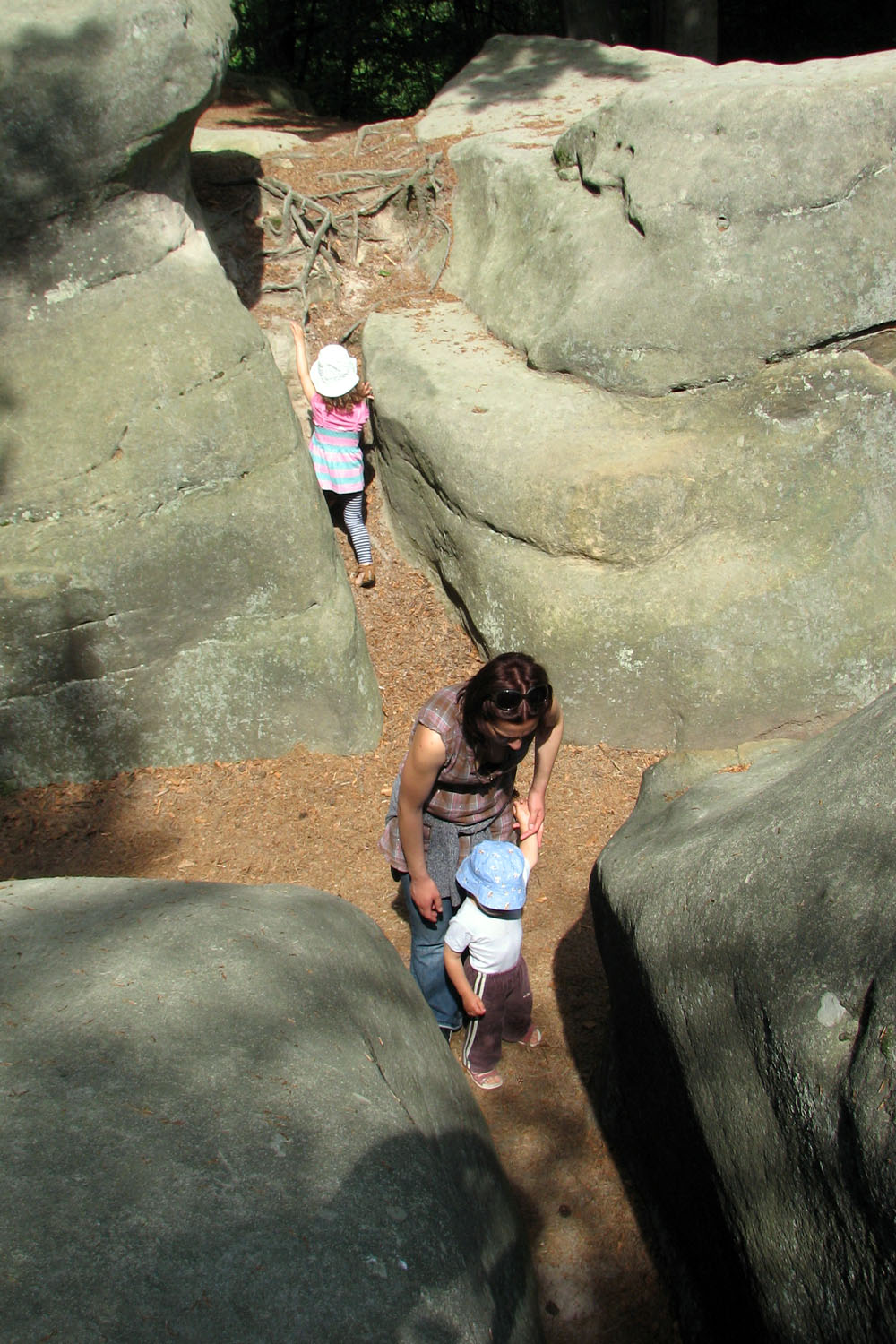
Stone Town Nature Reserve

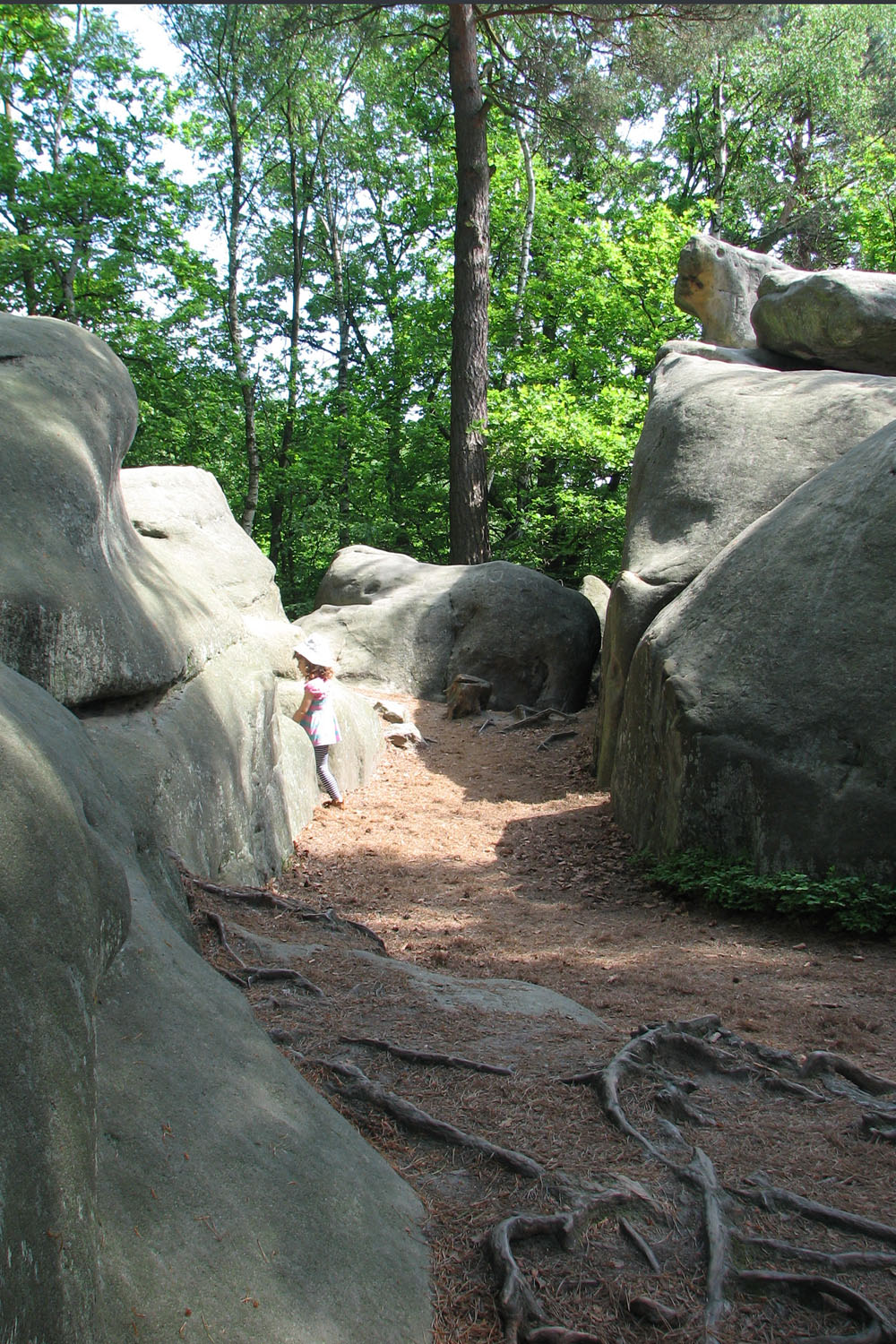
Nature Reserve

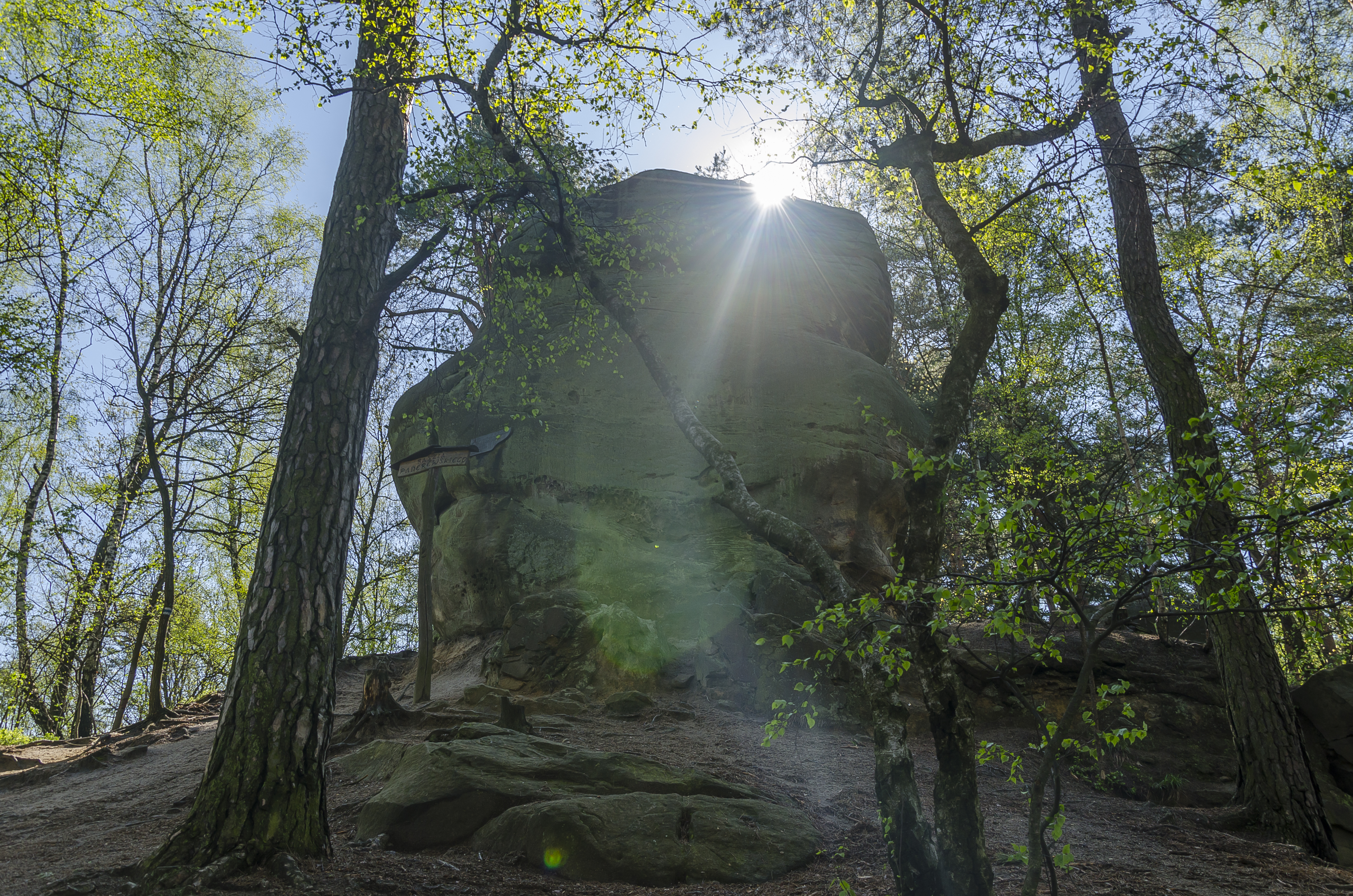
Rock formations
