= Zborowice =

Zborowice may refer to the following places in Poland:

- Zborowice, Lower Silesian Voivodeship (south-west Poland)
- Zborowice, Lesser Poland Voivodeship (south Poland)
