= Tursk (disambiguation) =

Tursk may refer to:

- Tursk, Masovian Voivodeship
- Tursk, Lubusz Voivodeship
- Occasional confusion with Tursko, as in, e.g., "Battle of Tursk"
