= Ostrusza =

- Village
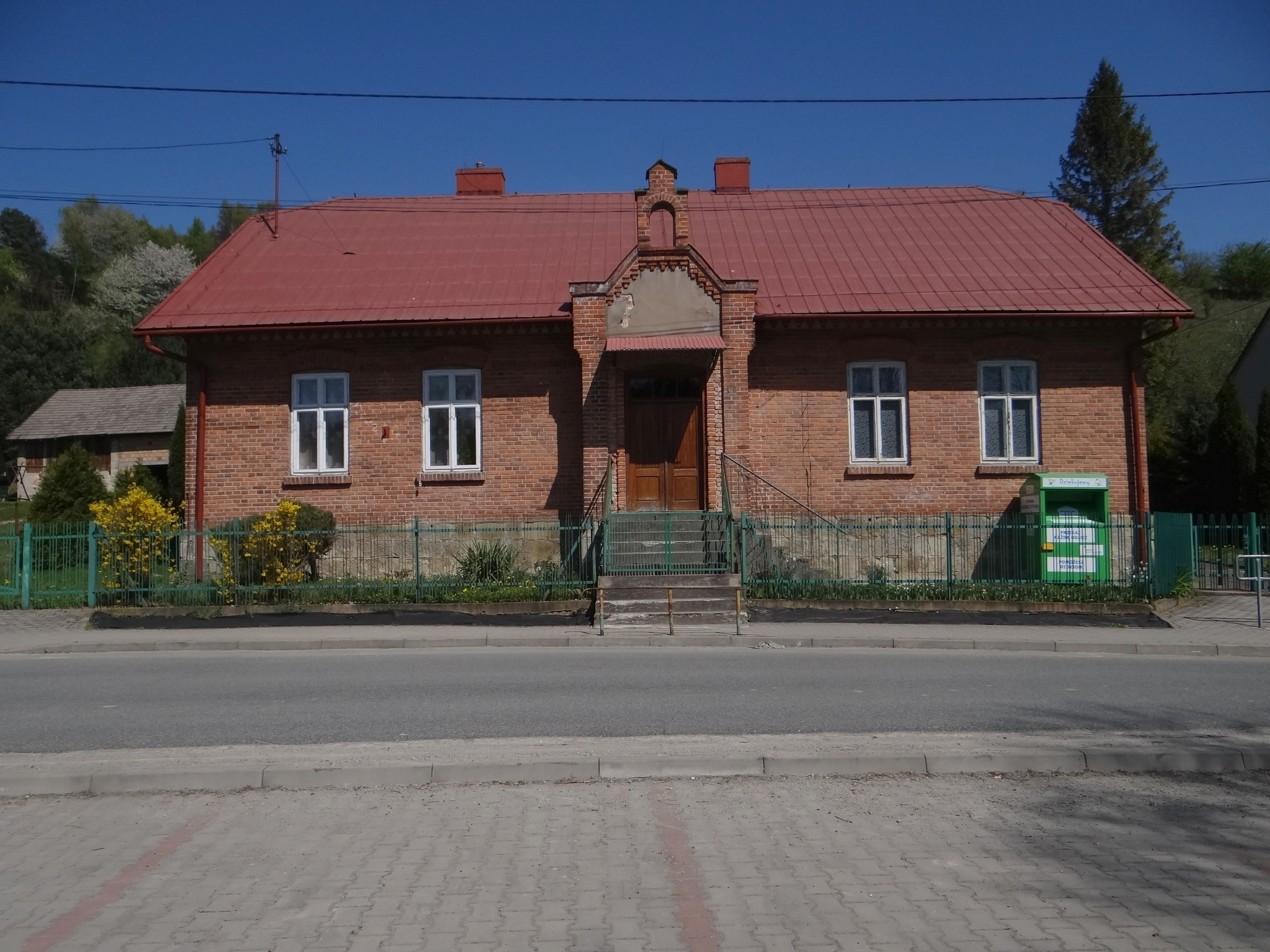

- Location within Poland
- Coordinates: 49°47′N 21°1′E
- Country: Poland
- Voivodeship: Lesser Poland
- County: Tarnów
- Gmina: Ciężkowice

Ostrusza [ɔsˈtruʂa] is a village in the administrative district of Gmina Ciężkowice, within Tarnów County, Lesser Poland Voivodeship, in southern Poland.
