= Siekierczyna, Tarnów County =

Siekierczyna
- Village
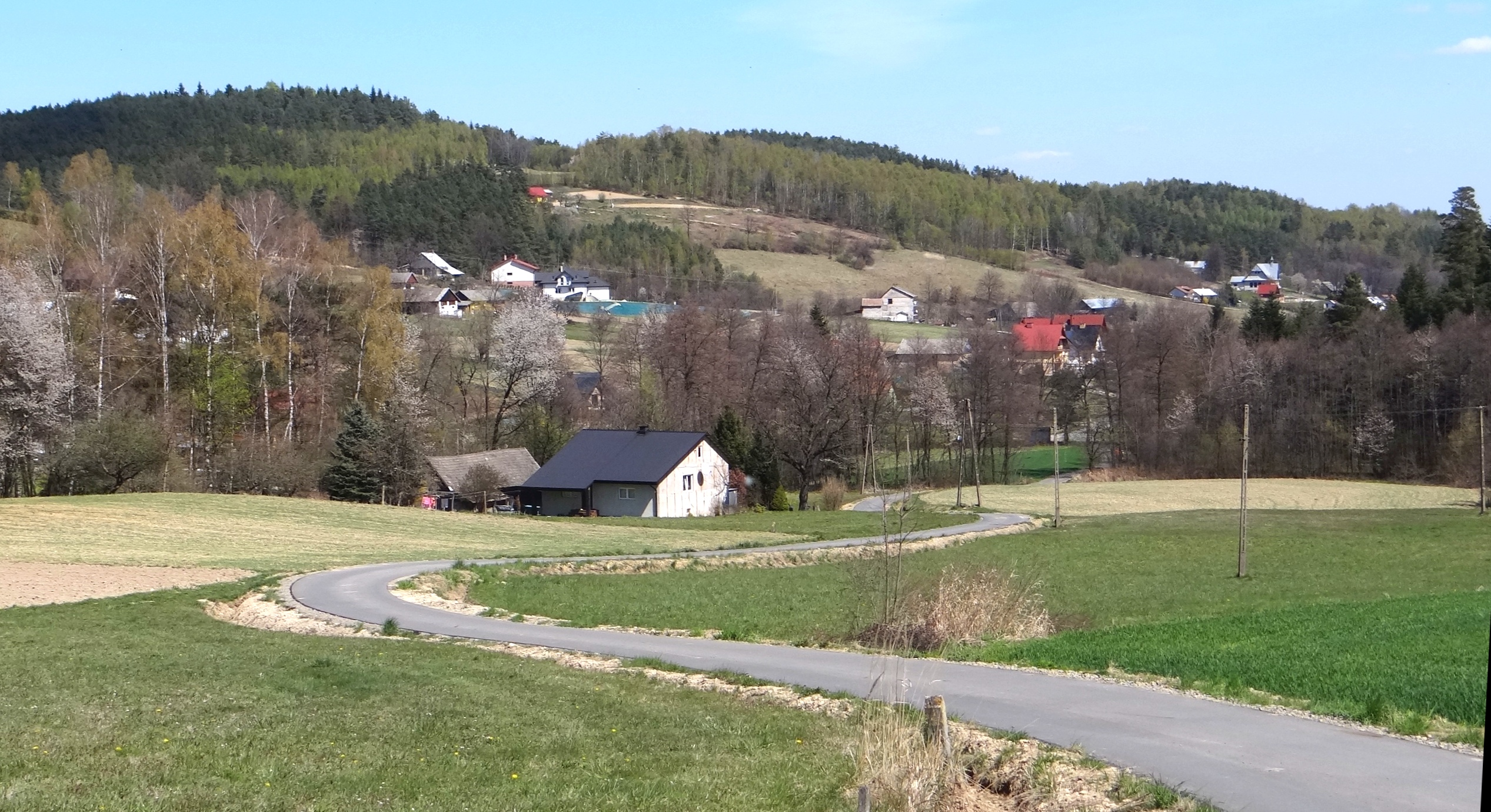

- Location within Poland
- Coordinates: 49°45′46″N 20°53′54″E
- Country: Poland
- Voivodeship: Lesser Poland
- County: Tarnów
- Gmina: Ciężkowice
- Population: 650

Siekierczyna [ɕɛkʲɛrˈt͡ʂɨna] is a village in the administrative district of Gmina Ciężkowice, within Tarnów County, Lesser Poland Voivodeship, in southern Poland.
