= Kipszna =

- Village
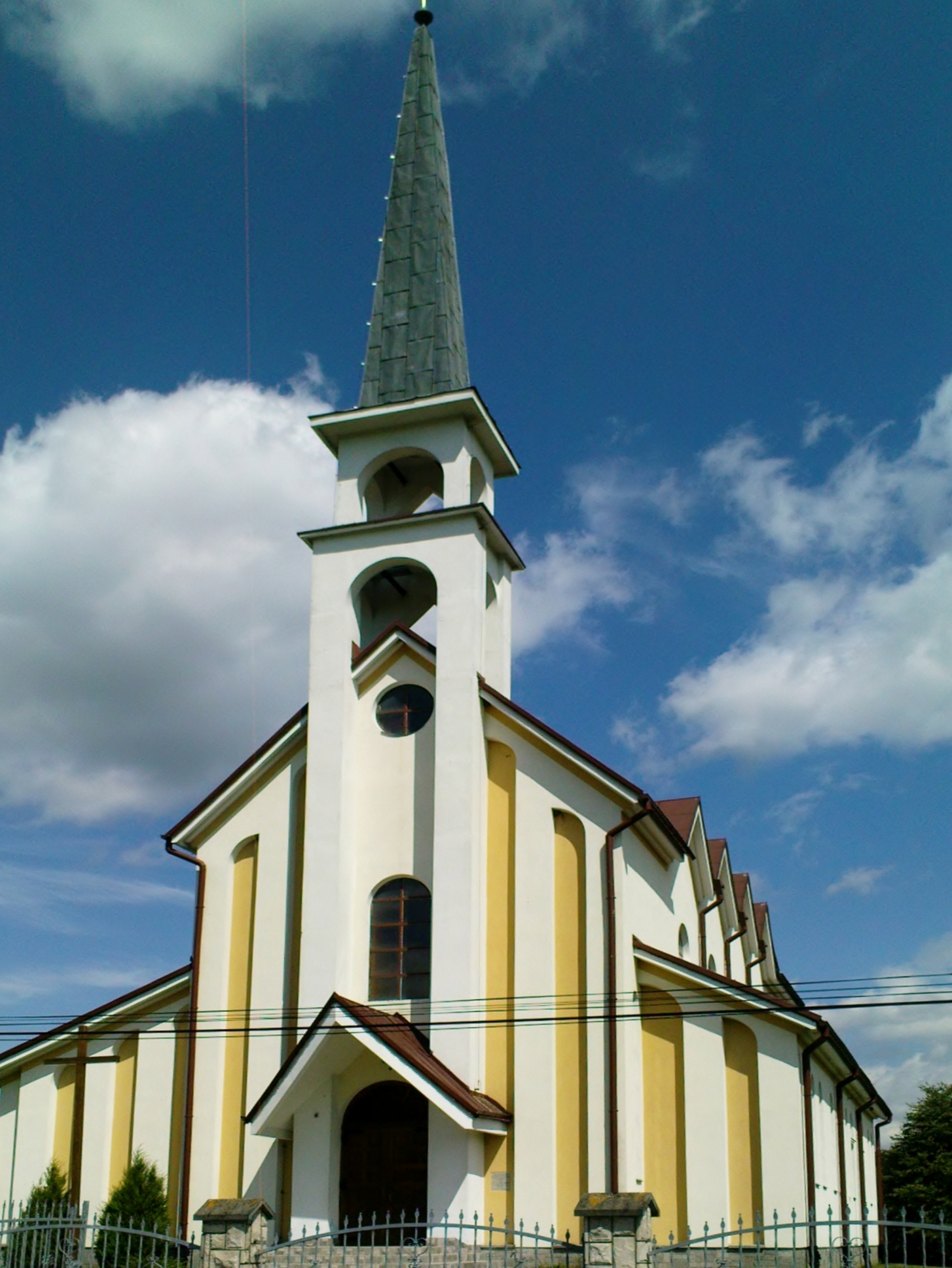
- Catholic church

- Location within Poland
- Coordinates: 49°48′N 20°54′E
- Country: Poland
- Voivodeship: Lesser Poland
- County: Tarnów
- Gmina: Ciężkowice

Kipszna [ˈkipʂna] is a village in the administrative district of Gmina Ciężkowice, within Tarnów County, Lesser Poland Voivodeship, in southern Poland.
