= Gmina Ciężkowice =

Gmina Ciężkowice Ciężkowice Commune
- Gmina
- Coat of arms
- Interactive map of Gmina Ciężkowice
- Coordinates (Ciężkowice): 49°48′N 20°58′E
- Country: Poland
- Voivodeship: Lesser Poland
- County: Tarnów County
- Seat: Ciężkowice

Area
  - Total: 103.22 km^{2} (39.85 sq mi)

Population (2006)
  - Total: 11,050
  - Density: 107.1/km^{2} (277.3/sq mi)
  - Urban: 2,378
  - Rural: 8,672
- Website: http://www.ciezkowice.pl/

Gmina Ciężkowice is an urban-rural gmina (administrative district) in Tarnów County, Lesser Poland Voivodeship, in southern Poland. Its seat is the town of Ciężkowice, which lies approximately 26 kilometres (16 mi) south of Tarnów and 80 km (50 mi) east of the regional capital Kraków.

The gmina covers an area of 103.22 square kilometres (39.9 sq mi), and as of 2006 its total population is 11,050 (out of which the population of Ciężkowice amounts to 2,378, and the population of the rural part of the gmina is 8,672).

The gmina contains part of the protected area called Ciężkowice-Rożnów Landscape Park.

== Villages ==
Apart from the town of Ciężkowice, Gmina Ciężkowice contains the villages and settlements of Bogoniowice, Bruśnik, Falkowa, Jastrzębia, Kąśna Dolna, Kąśna Górna, Kipszna, Ostrusza, Pławna, Siekierczyna, Tursko and Zborowice.

== Neighbouring gminas ==
Gmina Ciężkowice is bordered by the gminas of Bobowa, Gromnik, Korzenna, Moszczenica, Rzepiennik Strzyżewski and Zakliczyn.
