= Jastrzębia, Tarnów County =

Jastrzębia
- Village
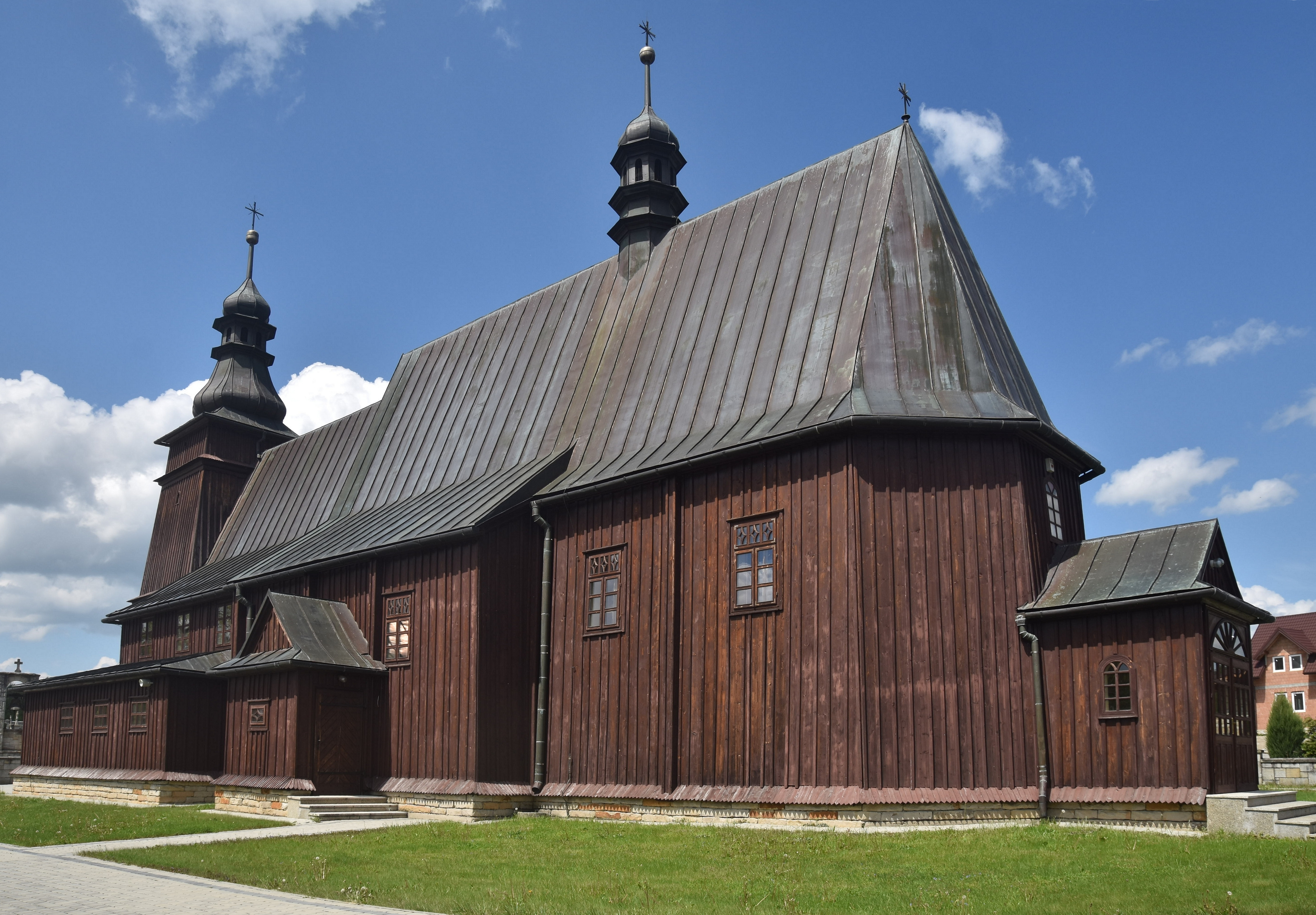
- Church of Saint Bartholomew

- Location within Poland
- Coordinates: 49°48′N 20°51′E
- Country: Poland
- Voivodeship: Lesser Poland
- County: Tarnów
- Gmina: Ciężkowice

Population
  - Total: 1,800

Jastrzębia [jasˈtʂɛmbja] is a village in the administrative district of Gmina Ciężkowice, within Tarnów County, Lesser Poland Voivodeship, in southern Poland.
