= Tursko =

Tursko may refer to places:

== Czech Republic ==
- Tursko (Prague-West District), Central Bohemian Region

== Poland ==
- Tursko, Greater Poland Voivodeship, west-central Poland
- Tursko, Pomeranian Voivodeship, north Poland
- Tursko, Lesser Poland Voivodeship, south Poland
