= Bruśnik =

- Village
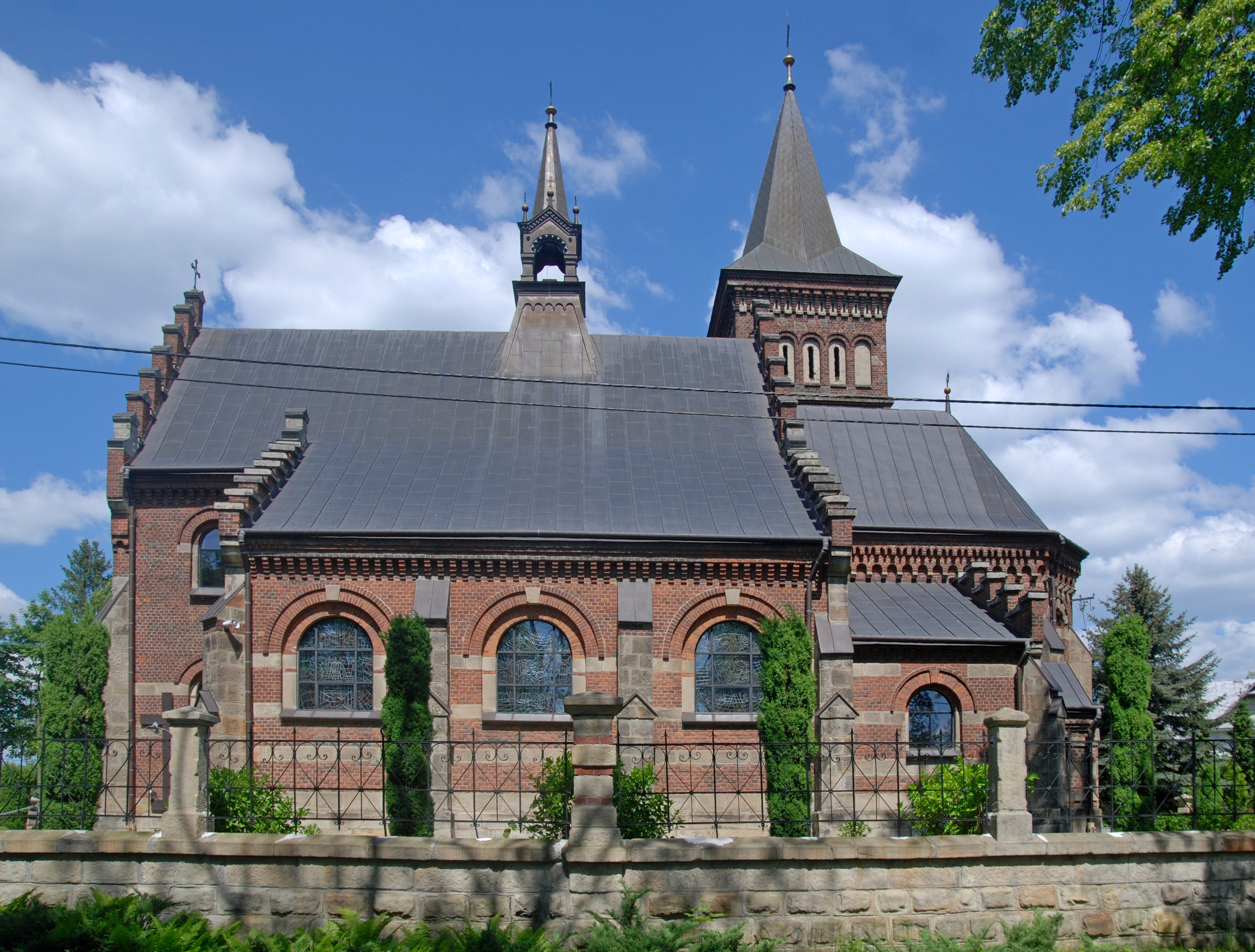
- Church of the Virgin Mary

- Location within Poland
- Coordinates: 49°45′N 20°55′E
- Country: Poland
- Voivodeship: Lesser Poland
- County: Tarnów
- Gmina: Ciężkowice

Population
  - Total: 350

Bruśnik [ˈbruɕnik] is a village in the administrative district of Gmina Ciężkowice, within Tarnów County, Lesser Poland Voivodeship, in southern Poland.
