= Bogoniowice =

- Village
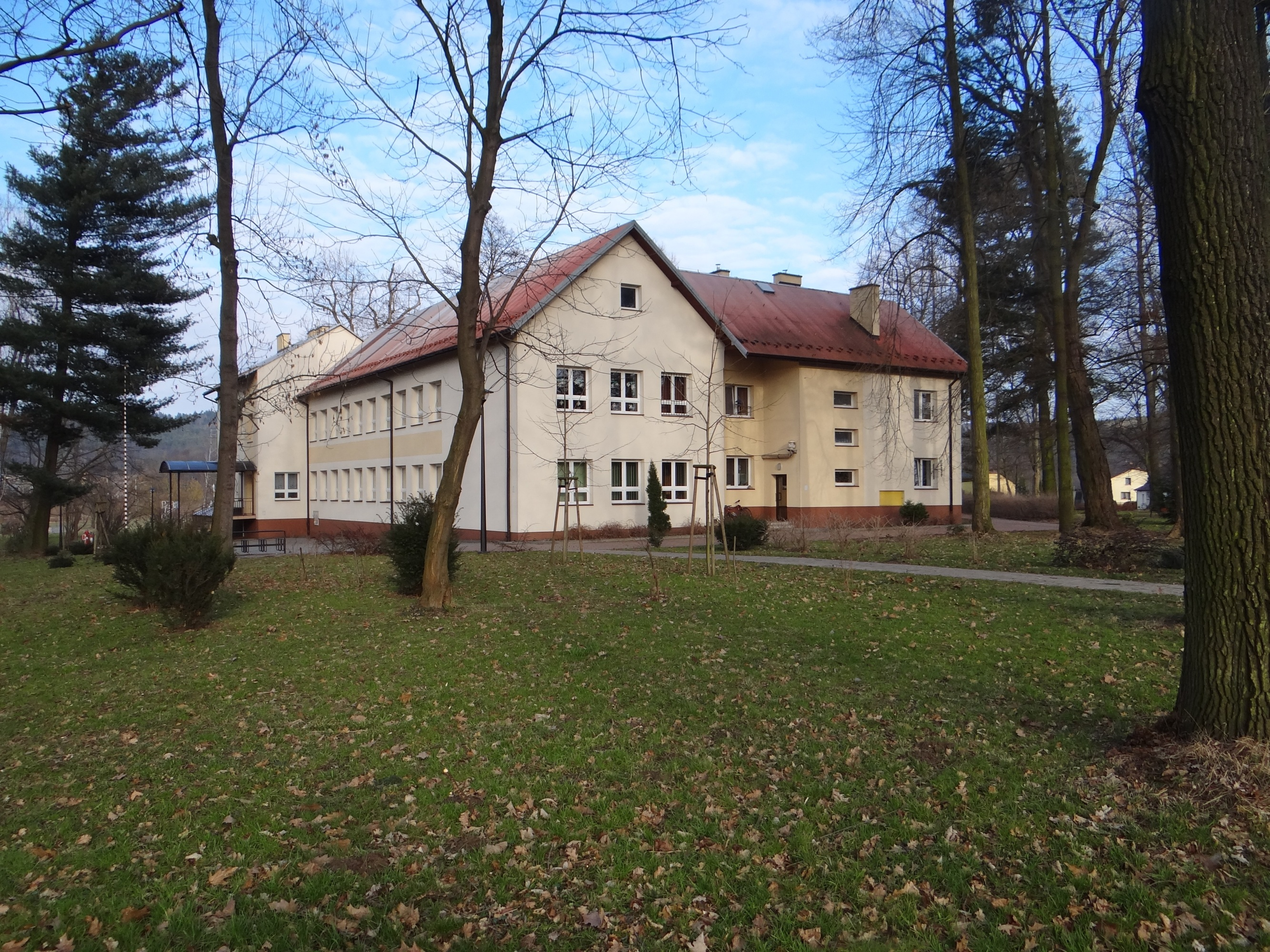
- School in Bogoniowice

- Location within Poland
- Coordinates: 49°48′N 20°58′E
- Country: Poland
- Voivodeship: Lesser Poland
- County: Tarnów
- Gmina: Ciężkowice

Bogoniowice [bɔɡɔɲɔˈvit͡sɛ] is a village in the administrative district of Gmina Ciężkowice, within Tarnów County, Lesser Poland Voivodeship, in southern Poland.
