= Tursko, Lesser Poland Voivodeship =

Tursko
- Village
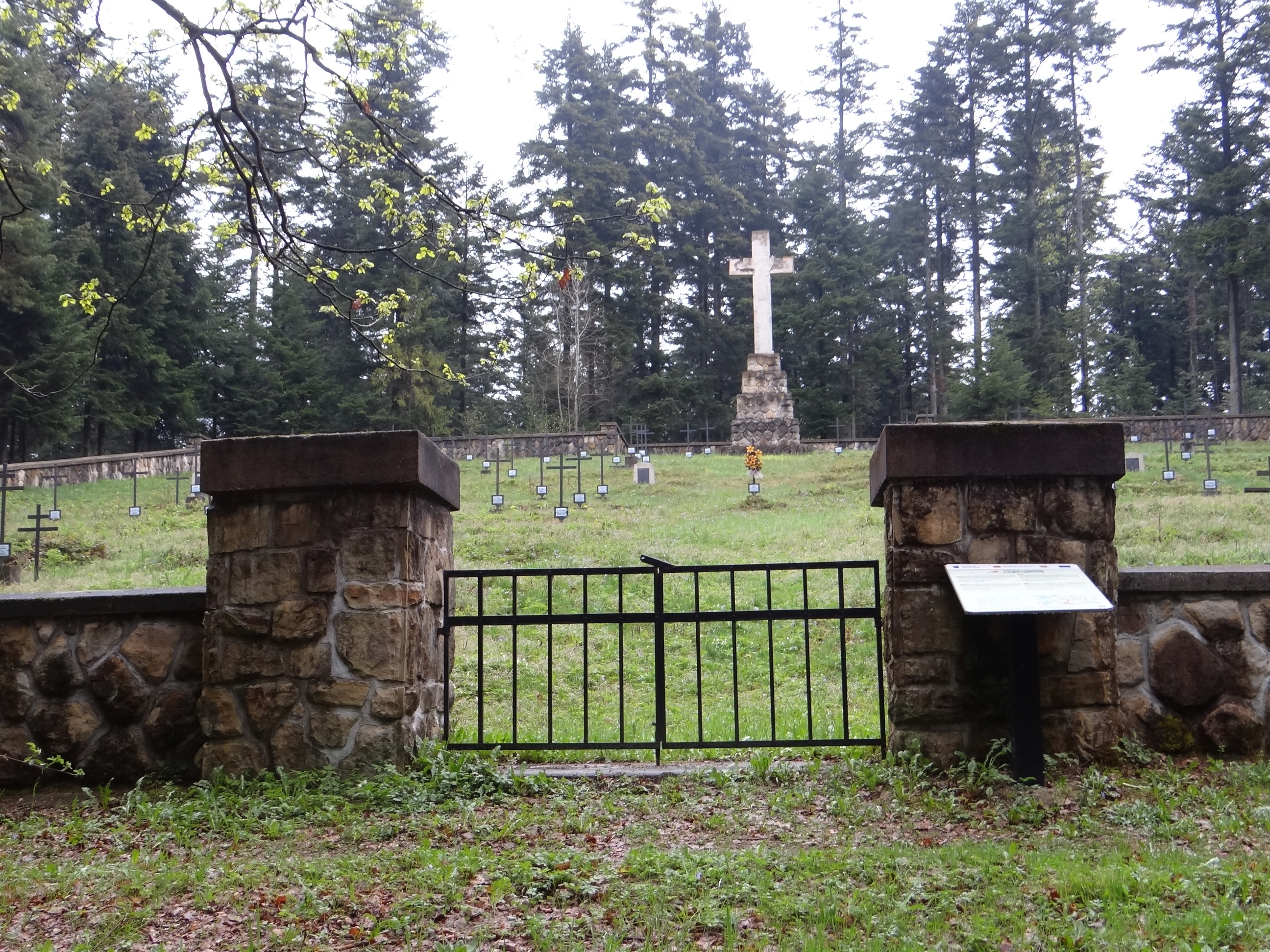
- War cemetery

- Location within Poland
- Coordinates: 49°48′N 20°58′E
- Country: Poland
- Voivodeship: Lesser Poland
- County: Tarnów
- Gmina: Ciężkowice

Tursko [ˈturskɔ] is a village in the administrative district of Gmina Ciężkowice, within Tarnów County, Lesser Poland Voivodeship, in southern Poland.
