= Pławna, Lesser Poland Voivodeship =

Pławna
- Village
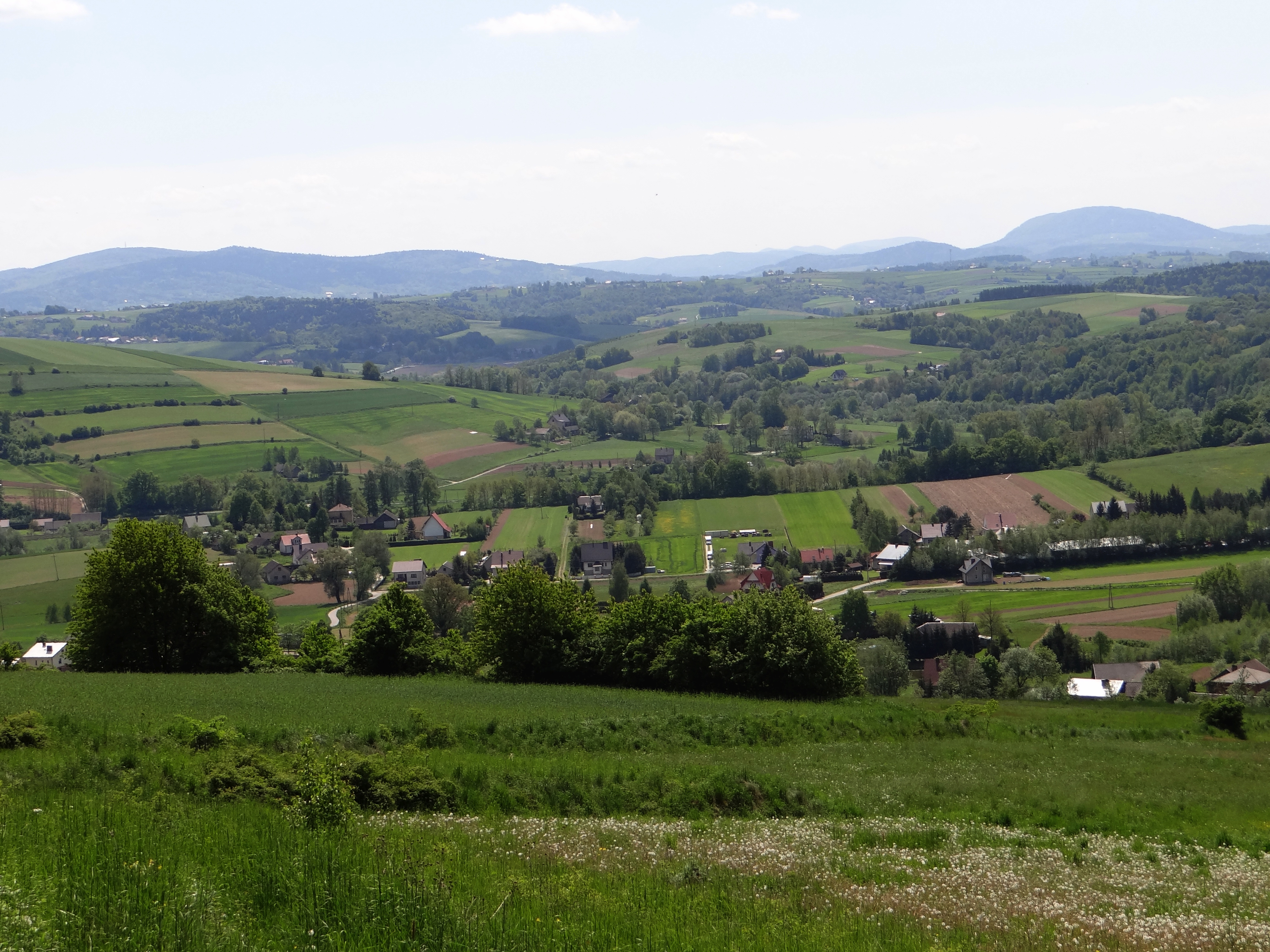

- Location within Poland
- Coordinates: 49°45′N 20°56′E
- Country: Poland
- Voivodeship: Lesser Poland
- County: Tarnów
- Gmina: Ciężkowice

Pławna [ˈpwavna] is a village in the administrative district of Gmina Ciężkowice, within Tarnów County, Lesser Poland Voivodeship, in southern Poland.

== World War II ==
Pławna was the location of Polish underground resistance attack on German military train conducted on the night of September 14, 1944 – a mishap, resulting from an unexpected change in train-schedule. The original German train with weapons and munitions – which was targeted by the Armia Krajowa intelligence, had been temporarily halted in Tuchów due to mechanical failure. Another train was let through a few hours later, carrying a Panzer division of the Wehrmacht, unknown to partisan unit of 100 men from the Battalion Barbara arriving from Zborów. The railway tracks were blown up only to realize the terrible mistake. The Polish soldiers retreated immediately under heavy enemy fire, with four casualties. The train returned to Tarnów; but the very next day, half the innocent village was burned down by the German SS in reprisal.
