= Zborowice, Lesser Poland Voivodeship =

Zborowice
- Village
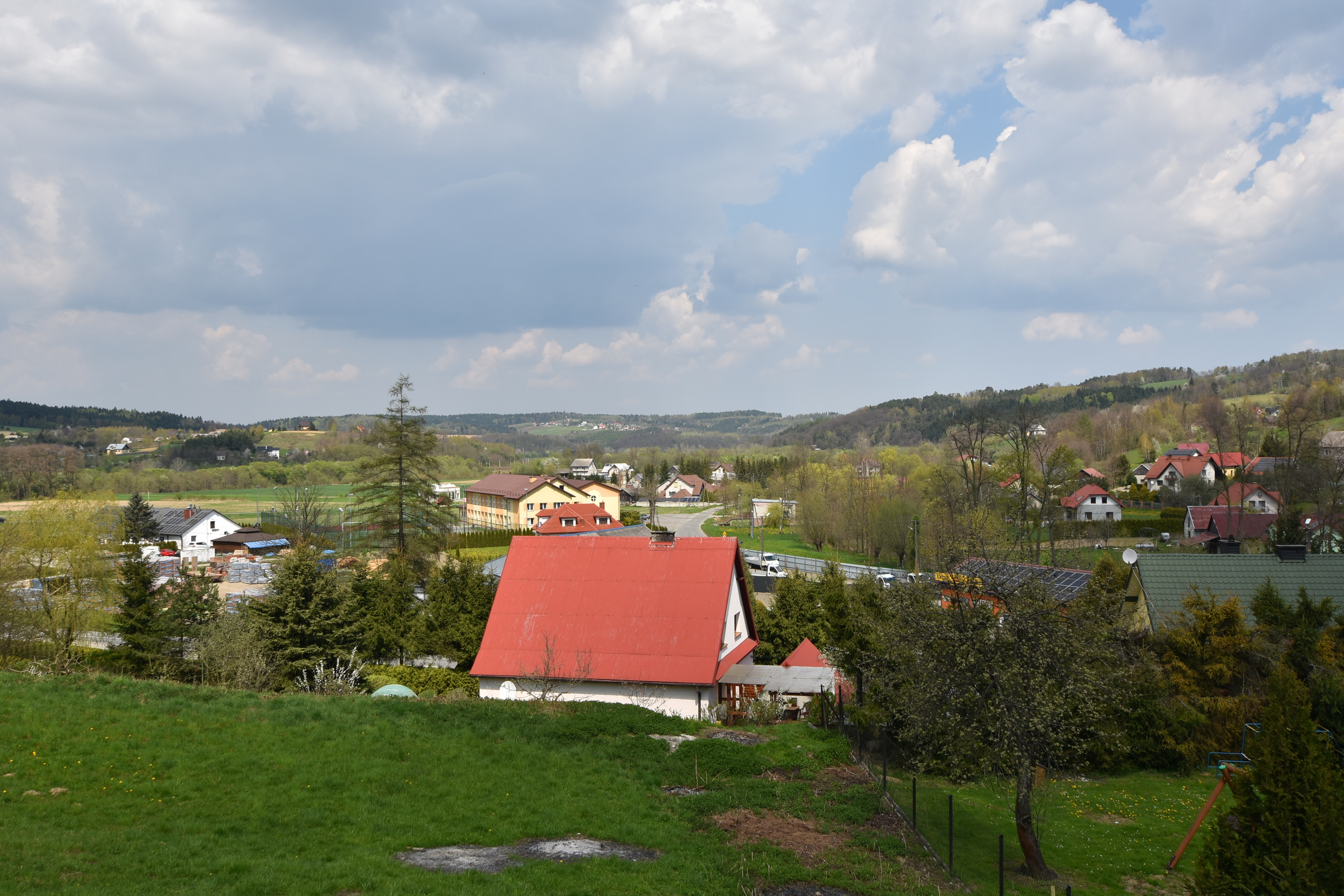

- Location within Poland
- Coordinates: 49°45′N 20°58′E
- Country: Poland
- Voivodeship: Lesser Poland
- County: Tarnów
- Gmina: Ciężkowice
- Population: 1,300

Zborowice [zbɔrɔˈvit͡sɛ] is a village in the administrative district of Gmina Ciężkowice, within Tarnów County, Lesser Poland Voivodeship, in southern Poland.
