= Kąśna Dolna =

- Village
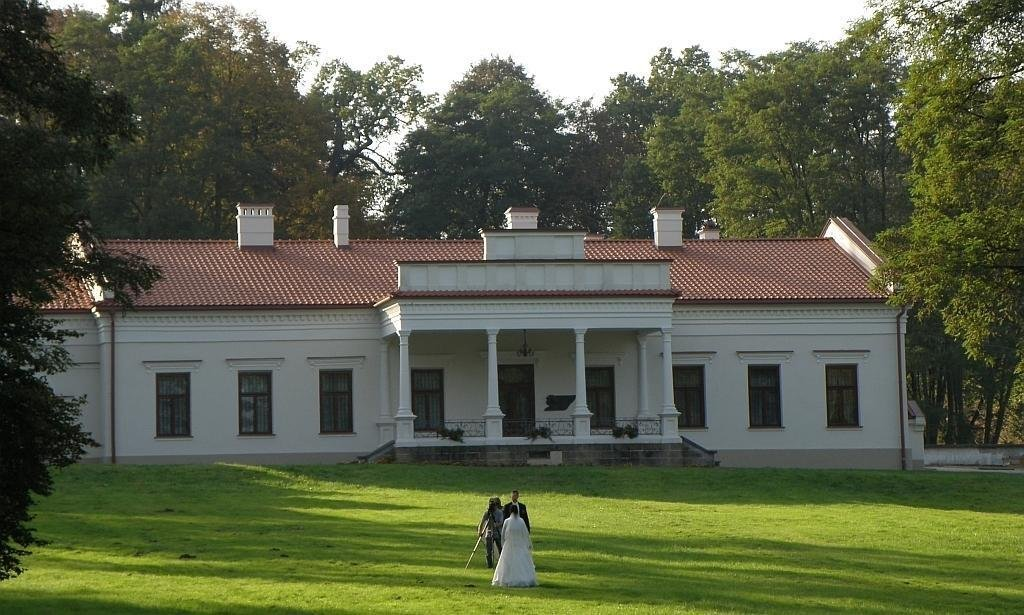
- Ignacy Paderewski manor house

- Location within Poland
- Coordinates: 49°46′N 20°55′E
- Country: Poland
- Voivodeship: Lesser Poland
- County: Tarnów
- Gmina: Ciężkowice

Kąśna Dolna [ˈkɔ̃ɕna ˈdɔlna] is a village in the administrative district of Gmina Ciężkowice, within Tarnów County, Lesser Poland Voivodeship, in southern Poland.
