= Kordian Józef Zamorski =

Chief of the Polish State Police

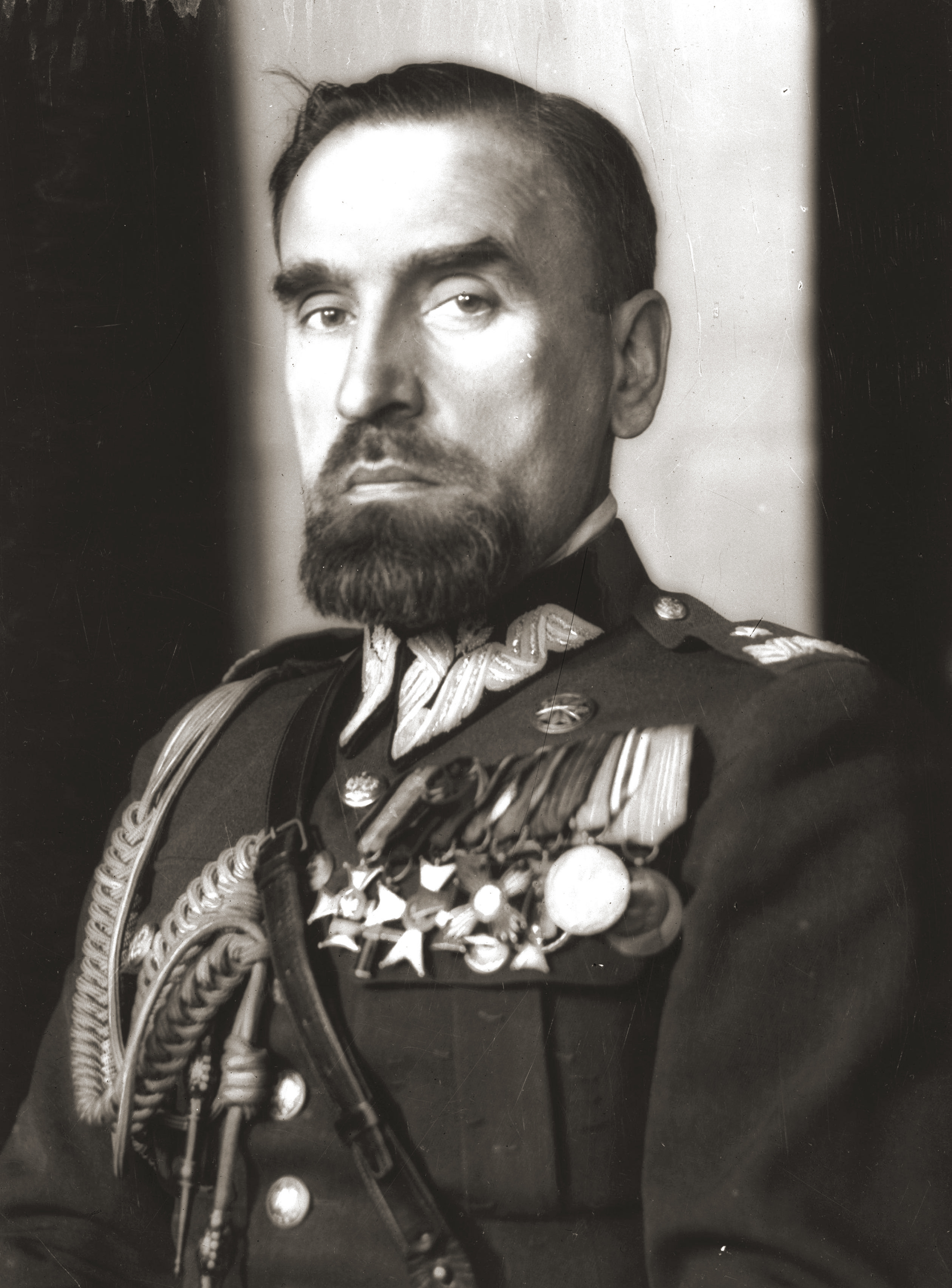
- Kordian Zamorski, c. 1935

Chief of the Polish State Police
- In office 25 January 1935 – 1 September 1939
- Preceded by: Janusz Jagrym-Maleszewski
- Succeeded by: Office abolished

Personal details
- Born: 1 April 1890 Kołkówka, Austria-Hungary
- Died: 19 December 1983 (aged 93) London, United Kingdom
- Spouse: Leokadia Karpusowa
- Children: 2
- Education: Jan Matejko Academy of Fine Arts
- Awards

Military service
- Allegiance: Austria-Hungary; Second Polish Republic
- Years of service: 1914–1941
- Rank: Generał dywizji (Major general); Inspector General of Police
- Unit: Polish Legions in World War I
- Battles/wars: World War I Polish–Ukrainian War; Polish–Soviet War; World War II

Kordian Józef Zamorski (Rzepiennik, near Gorlice, 1 April 1890 – 19 December 1983, London) was a Polish military officer and (1935–39) chief of the Polish State Police. In his latter capacity, he was regarded by critics as a repressor of political dissent.

Zamorski served in the Polish Legions in 1914–17, and as chief of staff of the Headquarters of the Polish Military Organisation. After the 1917 oath crisis, he served in the Austrian Army, and after November 1918 in the Polish Army. In 1920, he was chief of staff of the Army of the Republic of Central Lithuania, and then chief of staff of the Headquarters of Military District (Okręg Korpusu) III in Grodno (1923–24), assistant director of the General Staff of the Polish Army (1928–35), and chief of the Polish State Police (1935–39).

In 1966 he was promoted to the military rank of generał dywizji.

Zamorski died in London, England, on 19 December 1983.

== Early life ==
Kordian Józef Zamorski was born on 1 April 1890, in the real estate of Kolkowka, which belonged to the Roman Catholic parish of Rzepiennik Biskupi, County of Gorlice, Austrian Galicia. He attended the 6th High School in Lwów, after which he briefly studied teaching. In 1910, Zamorski entered the Jan Matejko Academy of Fine Arts in Kraków, where he studied painting under Józef Mehoffer (he spent two years there, 1910–11, and 1917–18).

Zamorski married Leokadia Karpusowa, and had two sons Jacek (born 1923) and Rafal (born 1928).

== World War I ==
In the early 1910s, Zamorski joined the Riflemen's Association and the Union of Active Struggle, Polish patriotic organizations, active in Galicia and commanded by Józef Piłsudski. In 1912, he graduated from unofficial military academy, and was awarded Officer Badge "Parasol", by Piłsudski.

In August 1914, he joined Polish Legions in World War I, and until July, 1917, served in the 1st Brigade, Polish Legions. He was company commandant, instructor at a NCOs' academy at Jablonna, battalion commandant (5th Legions Infantry Regiment), staff officer at the 1st Brigade, and adjutant at the 1st Legions Infantry Regiment. After the Oath crisis, Zamorski was forcibly drafted into the Austro-Hungarian Army, from which he deserted. Some time in either late 1917 or early 1918, he joined Polish Military Organisation (POW), and became commandant of Kraków District.

== Polish Army ==
In November 1918, following the regaining of independence by Poland and the establishment of the Second Polish Republic, Zamorski joined the 5th Legions Infantry Regiment, in which he commanded the 2nd Battalion of the newly formed Polish Armed Forces. Together with his unit, he fought against the Ukrainians in the Battle of Przemyśl (1918), and the Battle of Lemberg (1918). In January 1919, he was named commander of Reserve Battalion of the 32nd Infantry Regiment, stationed in Ciechanów.

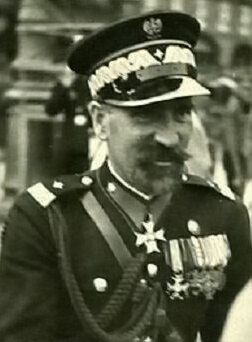
Kordian Zamorski, 1939

On 2 January 1920 Zamorski entered the Military Academy of Polish Army Headquarters in Warsaw. On April 16, he was sent to the Second Army, in which he became a Quartermaster. After one month, on 20 May 1920, Zamorski was named chief of First Unit of Polish Military Mission in Ukraine. After fighting in the Battle of Warsaw (1920), he became deputy chief of staff of Colonel Tadeusz Piskor.

After the Polish–Soviet War, Zamorski returned to Wyższa Szkoła Wojenna, graduating on 6 September 1921. Promoted to the officer of Polish General Staff, he was sent to Operational Group Bieniakonie. From late 1921 until 1923, Zamorski was battalion commander at the 35th Infantry Regiment in Brzesc nad Bugiem. In 1923–1924, he was chief of staff of the Third Military District in Grodno. After serving briefly as commandant of the 76th Infantry Regiment (Grodno), in October, 1925, he was sent to the Army Inspectorate as staff officer. In 1925 – 27, Zamorski was chief of Infantry Department of the Ministry of Military Affairs, and in 1928–1935, he served in the Polish General Staff. On 1 January 1935, Kordian Zamorski was promoted to the rank of General brygady.

On 25 January 1935 Zamorski was released from the Army and appointed chief of the Polish State Police. He remained in this post until the 1939 Invasion of Poland.

== World War II ==
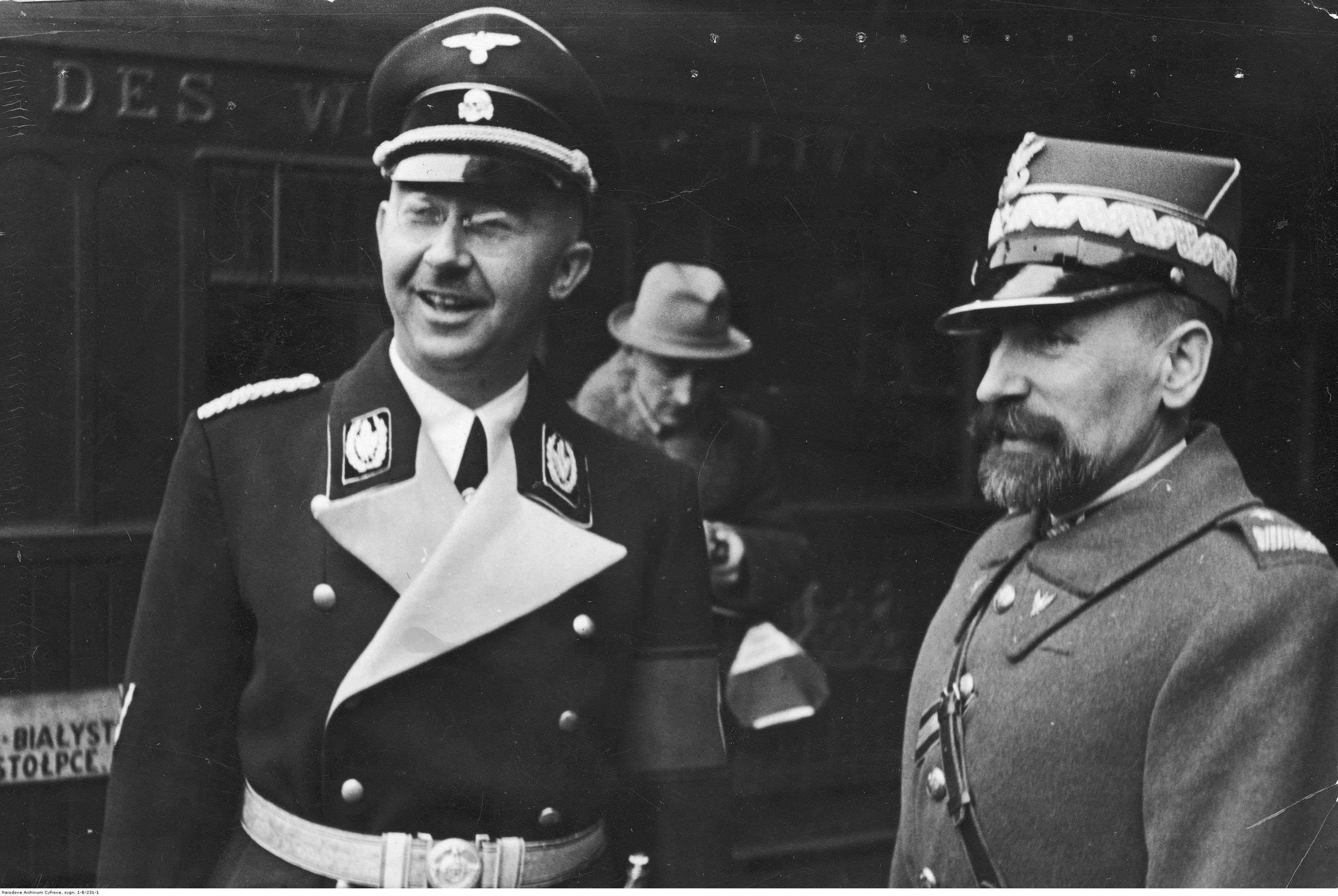
Heinrich Himmler and Kordian Zamorski 1939 in Warsaw

During the 1939 Campaign, he was evacuated to Romania and interned by Romanian authorities at the camp Băile Herculane. After escaping from the camp, Zamorski went to Turkey and then to Palestine (November 1940). He was appointed chief of Reserve Unit of the Polish Independent Carpathian Rifle Brigade, and retired from active service in 1941. After the war, Zamorski settled in London.

On 11 November 1966, Polish president-in-exile, August Zaleski, promoted Kordian Zamorski to the rank of Divisional general.

== Legacy ==
When Kordian Zamorski was chief of the Polish State Police (1935–39), critics often referred to him by the play-on-words, "Zamordian"—a conflation of the first two syllables of his surname, "Zamorski", with the second, final syllable of his given name, "Kordian." This whimsical alternative name for Zamorski played on the Polish colloquialism, "zamordyzm"—itself formed from "za" ("by") and "morda" ("muzzle")—which means "muzzling of dissent". Thus, to his critics, Zamorski was "Muzzler of Dissent".

== Promotions ==
- Porucznik Legionów Polskich (First lieutenant of Polish Legions) - 29 September 1914
- Kapitan (Captain) - 1918
- Major (Major) - 1918
- Podpułkownik (Lieutenant colonel) - 1920
- Pułkownik (Colonel) - 31 March 1924
- Generał brygady (Brigadier general) - 1 January 1931
- Inspektor Generalny Policji (Inspector General of Police) - 25 January 1935
- Generał dywizji (Major general) - 11 November 1966

== Awards and decorations ==
- Polish:
  - Silver Cross of Virtuti Militari
  - Grand Cordon of the Order of Polonia Restituta (11 November 1966)
  - Commander of the Order of Polonia Restituta (11 November 1936)
  - Cross of Independence (20 January 1931)
  - Officer's Cross of the Order of Polonia Restituta (10 November 1927)
  - Cross of Valour (four times)
  - Gold Cross of Merit (18 March 1932)
  - Cross of Merit for Bravery (7 August 1939)
  - Cross of Merit of the Army of Central Lithuania (1926)
  - Commemorative Medal for the War of 1918–1921
  - Medal of the 10th Anniversary of Regained Independence
- From other countries:
  - Order of the White Star, 1st Class (Estonia, 1938)
  - Order of the Cross of the Eagle, 2nd Class (Estonia, 1933)
  - Commander Grand Cross of the Order of the Three Stars (Latvija, 1936)
  - Grand Officer Order of the Three Stars (Latvija, 1934)
  - Commander of the Order of the Star of Romania (Romania, 1929)
  - Grand Officer of the Order of the Crown of Romania (Romania, 1931)
  - Grand Officer of the Order of the White Lion (Czechoslovakia, 1932)
  - Commander's Cross of the Order of the White Eagle (Yugoslavia, 1929)
  - Grand Officer of the Order of the Yugoslav Crown (Yugoslavia, 1933)
  - Commander of the Order of St. Sava Yugoslavia)
  - Hungarian Order of Merit, 3rd Class (Hungary)
  - Commander of the Legion of Honour (France)

== See also ==
- List of Poles
