= Rzepiennik =

Rzepiennik may refer to the following places in Poland:

- Rzepiennik Biskupi
- Rzepiennik Marciszewski
- Rzepiennik Strzyżewski
- Rzepiennik Suchy
