= Hieronim Ryba =

Hieronim Antoni Ryba
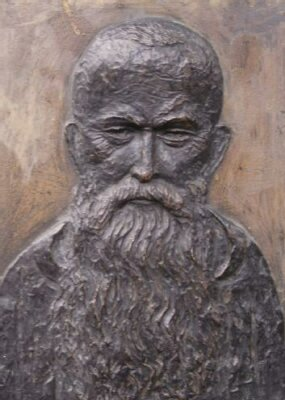
- Hieronim Antoni Ryba
- Born: 12 May 1850; Rzepiennik Suchy
- Died: 18 December 1927 (aged 77); Rozwadów
- Burial place: Rozwadów Parish Cemetery Location: F/J/4

Hieronim Ryba, born as Antoni Ryba, OFMCap (12 May 1850 – 18 December 1927) was a Polish Capuchin friar, church builder, priest, and confessor. He died with a reputation for holiness, and his cult remains alive among the local population of Rozwadów, who consider him an unofficial patron of those taking exams.

== Biography ==
The son of farmers from Rzepiennik Suchy, he received his early education at the village school of Jan Trębecki and the parish school in Rzepiennik Biskupi. He attended secondary school in Tarnów and later in Rzeszów. He joined the Capuchin order in the Galician Province on 3 October 1871, in Sędziszów Małopolski. He took his simple vows in 1875 in Lviv. He began his studies in philosophy and theology in Kraków, where he studied at the Faculty of Theology of the Jagiellonian University between 1873 and 1876. He completed his studies in 1875 and was ordained a priest in that same year in Lviv. He made his religious vows on 29 November 1875, in Lviv.

He worked in monasteries in Kraków, Sędziszów Małopolski, Krosno, Olesko, and Rozwadów. From the beginning of his ministry, he was known as a zealous pastor and confessor, as well as a lover of walking pilgrimages. Father Ryba served as novice master and guardian in Krosno, before being transferred to the Rozwadów convent, where he twice held the position of guardian. In 1894, together with the parish priest of Rozwadów, he began preparations for the construction of the parish church of Our Lady of Mount Carmel. On 16 July 1907, Fr. Hieronim consecrated the church and celebrated the first Mass there. He built a second church, dedicated to the Visitation of the Blessed Virgin Mary, in Wola Rzeczycka between 1911 and 1914. During World War I, this church was destroyed, but under Father Ryba's care, it was restored between 1918 and 1921. In 1923, together with Ignacy Chyła, he built the Chapel of Our Lady of the Rosary in Chyły – now a district of Stalowa Wola.

In the later years of his life, Father Hieronim Ryba focused on prayer and his duties as a confessor. He was widely cherished by the local community, especially the youth, for his kindness, gentleness, and compassionate nature. Father Hieronim died on 18 December 1927 in Rozwadów and was laid to rest in the Rozwadów Parish Cemetery (grave location: F/J/4). To this day, young people hold his memory in high regard, frequently visiting his grave to pray for success in exams and other significant life challenges.
