= Ryba =

Ryba (Czech and Slovak feminine: Rybová) is a Czech, Polish and Slovak surname, meaning 'fish'. Notable people with the surname include:

- Hieronim Ryba (1850–1927), Polish friar, priest and church builder
- Jakub Jan Ryba (1765–1815), Czech composer and teacher
- Jiří Ryba (born 1976), Czech decathlete
- John Joseph Ryba (1929–2021), American politician
- Linda Rybová (born 1975), Czech actress
- Matúš Ryba (born 2009), Slovak racing driver
- Mike Ryba (1903–1971), American baseball player
- Pavla Rybová (born 1978), Czech pole vaulter

== See also ==
- 2523 Ryba, a main-belt asteroid
