= Olszyny, Gmina Rzepiennik Strzyżewski =

Olszyny
- Village
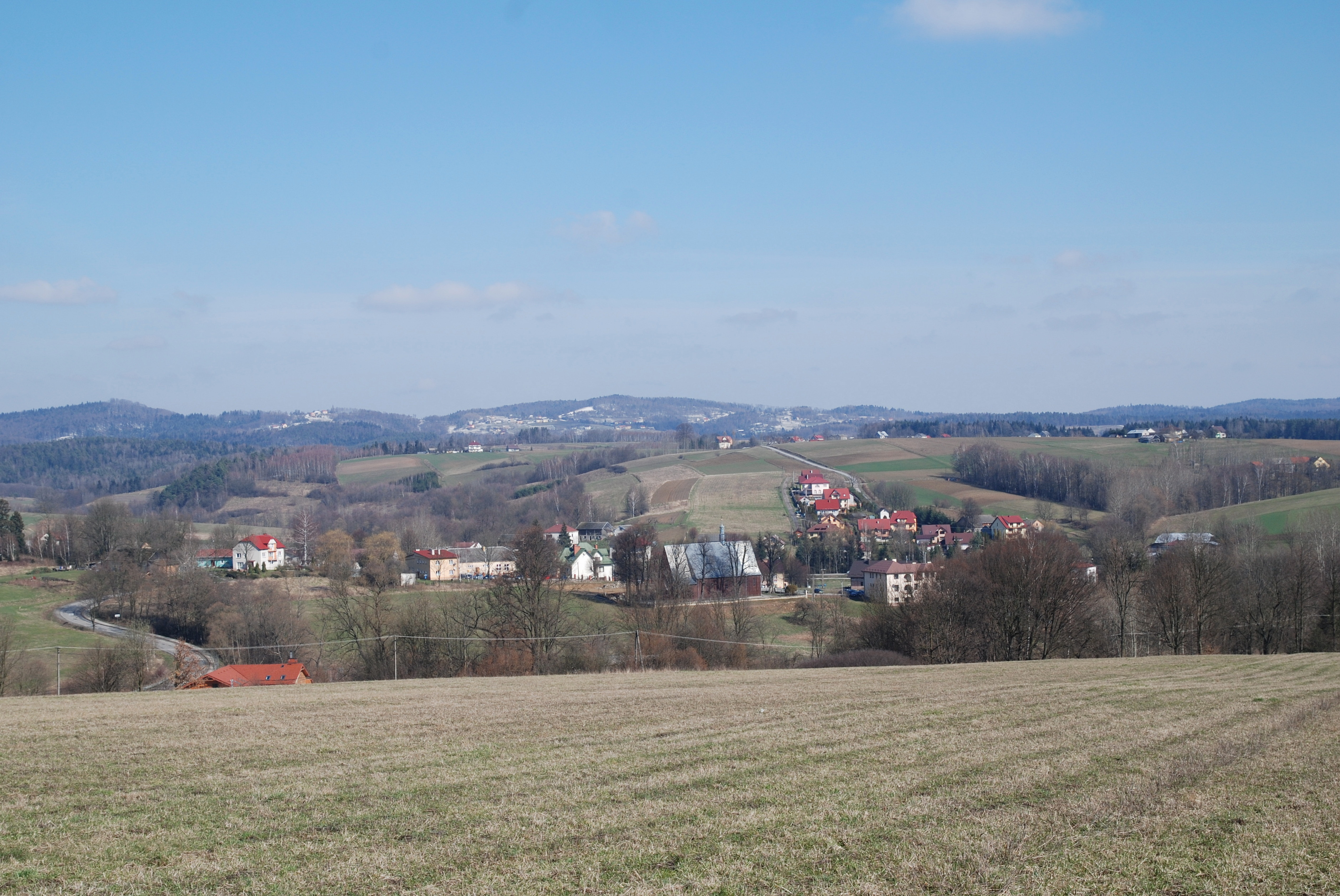

- Location within Poland
- Coordinates: 49°48′37″N 21°8′22″E
- Country: Poland
- Voivodeship: Lesser Poland
- County: Tarnów
- Gmina: Rzepiennik Strzyżewski

Olszyny [ɔlˈʂɨnɨ] is a village in the administrative district of Gmina Rzepiennik Strzyżewski, within Tarnów County, Lesser Poland Voivodeship, in southern Poland.
