= Jan Jur-Gorzechowski =

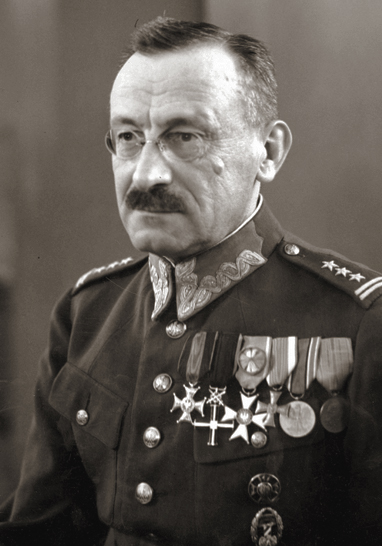
- Jan Jur-Gorzechowski in 1936
- Born: 21 December 1874; Siedlce, Siedlce Governorate, Congress Poland, Russian Empire
- Died: 21 June 1948 (aged 73) London, United Kingdom
- Buried: Brookwood, United Kingdom
- Allegiance: Kingdom of Poland (1885–1918); Second Polish Republic (1918–1925)
- Branch: Austro-Hungarian Army; Polish Legions; Polish Army
- Service years: 1914-1939
- Rank: Generał brygady (Brigadier general)
- Commands: Border Guard; State Police
- Conflicts: First World War; Siege of Warsaw
- Awards: Virtuti Militari; Order of Polonia Restituta; Cross of Independence; Cross of Valour; Order of the Star of Romania
- Spouse: Zofia Nałkowska

Jan Jur-Gorzechowski (born December 21, 1874 – June 21, 1948) was a brigadier general of the Polish Armed Forces. In addition to his service in the army he also served at the Polish Border Guard and the Polish State Police.

== Biography ==
=== Independence activities ===
He was born to Henryk, an insurgent from the January Uprising and Zofia née Tonkel-Ślepowron. His brother was Lieutenant Henryk Gorzechowski (1892–1940, victim of the Katyn massacre, author of the painting of Our Lady of Kozielsk).

After completing a six-year secondary school in Siedlce, he continued his education at the Leopold Kronenberg Higher School of Commerce in Warsaw. He graduated in 1897 and became a railway clerk. During his school and student years, he was a member of youth underground organizations. From 1904, he was active in the PPS Combat Organization. He was a co-organizer and commander of the action to free ten political prisoners sentenced to death by a summary military court on April 24, 1906 from Pawiak Prison. The action was carried out by a six-person combat unit of the OB PPS, under the command of Gorzechowski – "Jura" disguised in the uniforms of the Tsarist gendarmerie (under the pretext of escorting prisoners) (other participants included Edward Dąbrowski "Łysy", Franciszek Łagowski, Antoni Kola). In November 1907 he was arrested. In May 1908, the sentence of exile was changed to a sentence of expulsion from Russia.

From 1908 he was active in the Union of Active Combat, then in the Riflemen's Union in Lviv. In August 1914 he joined the Polish Legions. In November 1914, after the disbandment of Wacław Kostek-Biernacki's unit, he took over as head of the field gendarmerie of the 1st Brigade of the Legions. In July 1915, by order of the Imperial and Royal Supreme Army Command in Zamość, "he was arrested for illegal recruitment and taken to the Command of the Polish Legions Group with an order to be held accountable". The Commander of the Polish Legions Group, Colonel Wiktor Grzesicki, punished him with a fourteen-day peace arrest for exceeding the competence of an intelligence officer and illegal recruitment. The Austrian authorities demanded that he be removed from the Legions, so at the end of April 1916 he moved to Warsaw and became a member of the Supreme Command of the Polish Military Organization.

From November 11, 1918, following the regaining of independence and the establishment of the Second Polish Republic he was the commander of the City Militia in Warsaw, and then the first commander of the State Police and the director of the Security Department in the Ministry of Internal Affairs.

=== Service in the Polish Army ===
On December 13, 1918, following he was accepted into the Polish Army and appointed captain of the gendarmerie with seniority from December 2, 1918.

In January 1919, during the unsuccessful coup attempt carried out by the National Democrats, he was seriously wounded, which further increased his merits in Józef Piłsudski's eyes.

In August 1919, he returned to service in the gendarmerie. He held the following positions: officer for orders of the Field Gendarmerie Command, commander of the Field Gendarmerie from September 27, 1920, and commander of the 3rd gendarmerie division in Grodno from July 7, 1922 to December 22, 1927.

In the years 1922–1929, he was in a second marriage to Zofia Nałkowska. From his first marriage he had a son Stanisław, who died on September 25, 1939, as a reserve second lieutenant and commander of the gendarmerie platoon no. 28.

In the years 1927-1928 he was the commandant of the City of Brześć. In February 1928 he was assigned to the Warsaw City Command, while retaining his previous service allowance. On December 12, 1928 he was assigned to the position of commander-in-chief of the Border Guard at the Ministry of the Treasury, while simultaneously being dismissed from his position at the Warsaw Square command. On March 19, 1938 he was promoted to the rank of brigadier general. On March 1, 1939 he was retired.

After the Invasion of Poland he was interned in Romania, in a camp in Ploiesti. Then he made his way to the Middle East, where from December 1940 to April 1943 he was in the Reserve Centre of the Independent Carpathian Rifle Brigade in Mandatory Palestine. From April 1943 to 1947 he remained without assignment. With the consent of the Polish authorities, and on behalf of the British authorities, he organised and directed the training of the security services in Palestine.

After demobilization he settled in Brookwood in Surrey, United Kingdom. He died on 21 June 1948 in a military hospital in London. He was buried in the Brookwood cemetery.
