= State Police (Poland) =

State Police Policja Państwowa (Polish)

Agency overview
- Formed: 1919
- Preceding agency: Various
- Dissolved: 1939 (de facto)
- Superseding agency: Citizens' Militia
- Employees: 33,000

Jurisdictional structure
- National agency: PL
- Operations jurisdiction: PL
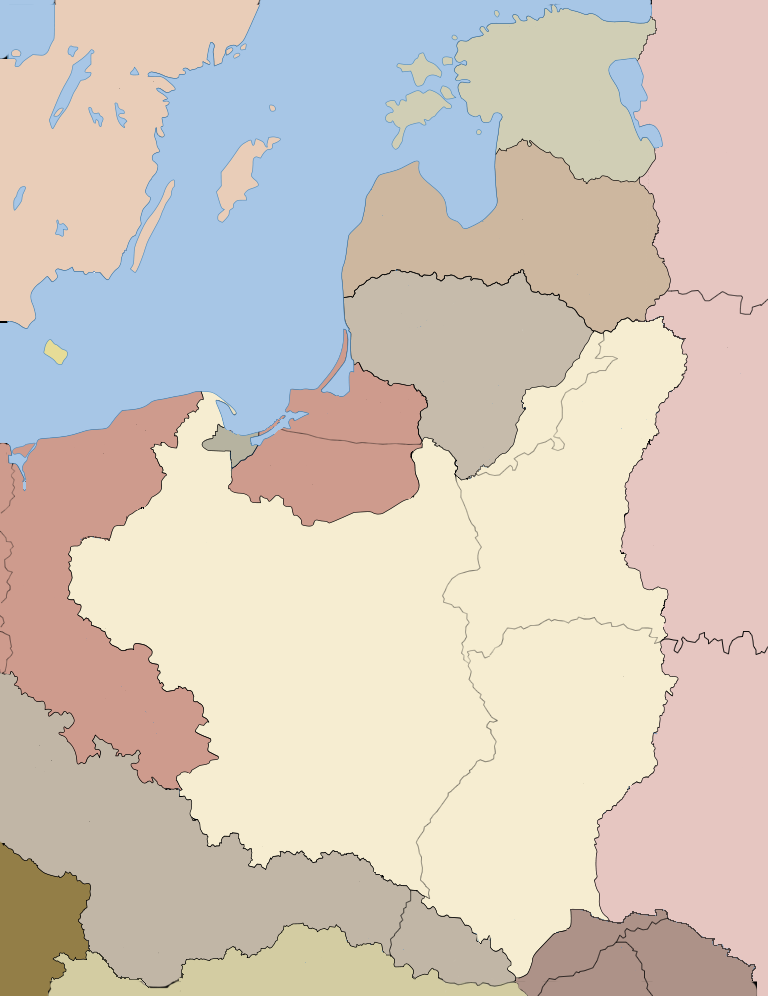
- Jurisdiction of the Policja
- General nature: Civilian police

Operational structure
- Headquarters: Warsaw
- Agency executive: Inspector Jan Jur-Gorzechowski (first), Commander-in-Chief

State Police (Polish: Policja Państwowa) was the main police force during the existence of the Second Polish Republic in the years 1919–1928 and a uniform, military-style corps designed to maintain security, peace and public order in the years 1928–1939. The security protection system in the Second Polish Republic was shaped in the years 1918–1923, and the culmination of this process was the issuance of the regulation of the President of Poland of 6 March 1928 "on the State Police", when the organization of the institution was finally established and in this form it lasted until September 1939. The Main Headquarters of the State Police was located in the Zamoyski Palace 67 Nowy Świat street in Warsaw.

== History ==
=== Establishment ===
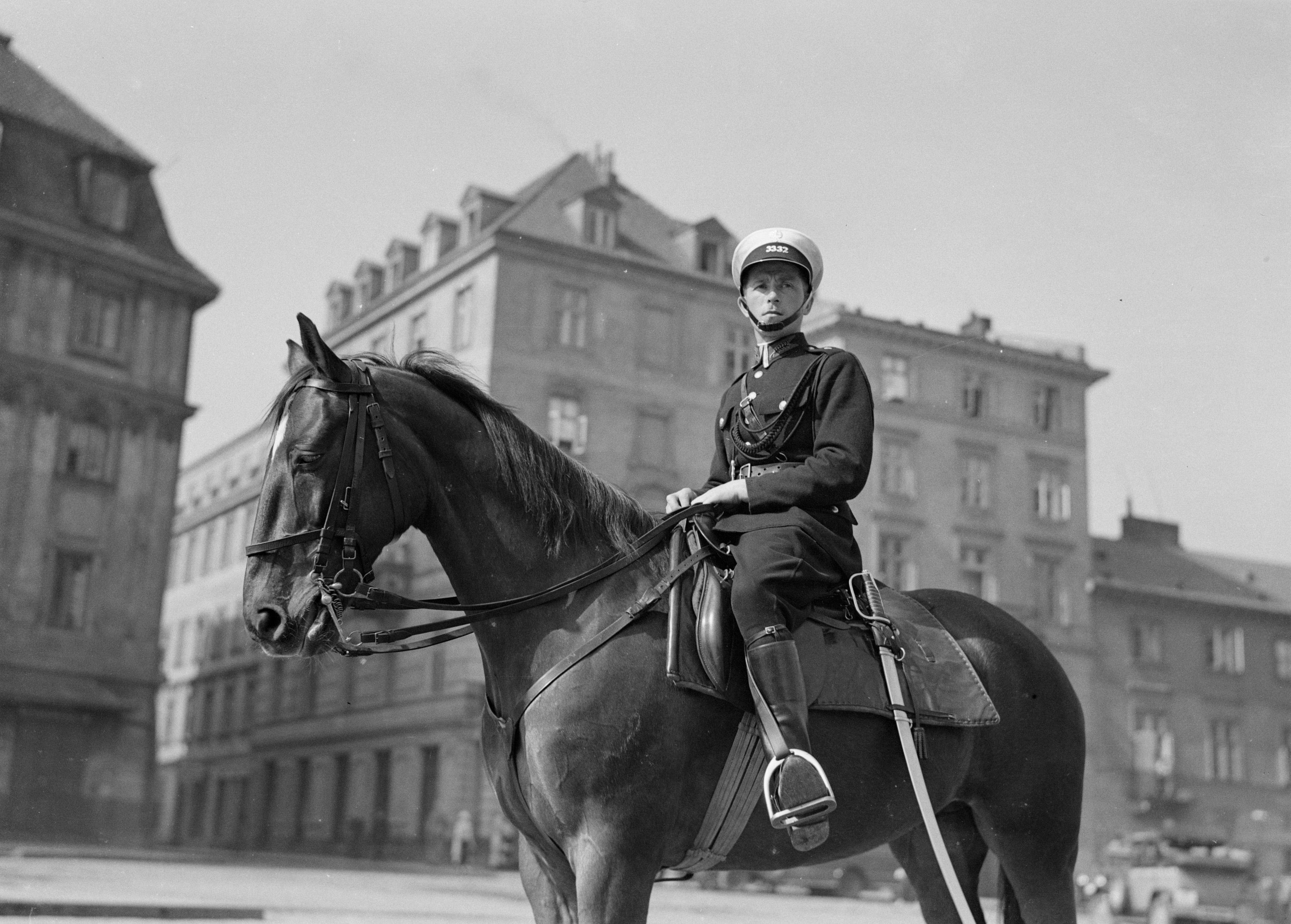
Mounted officer of the State Police, 1934

Following the regaining of independence by Poland after World War I, there the need to establish unified police force arose. The organization was established in Poland under the act of July 24, 1919 on the state police, which unified the previously existing police formations of the People's Militia (Polish: Milicja Ludowa), established by the decree of the Chief of State, Józef Piłsudski on December 5, 1918 and the Municipal Police, established by the decree of the Chief of State on January 9, 1919.

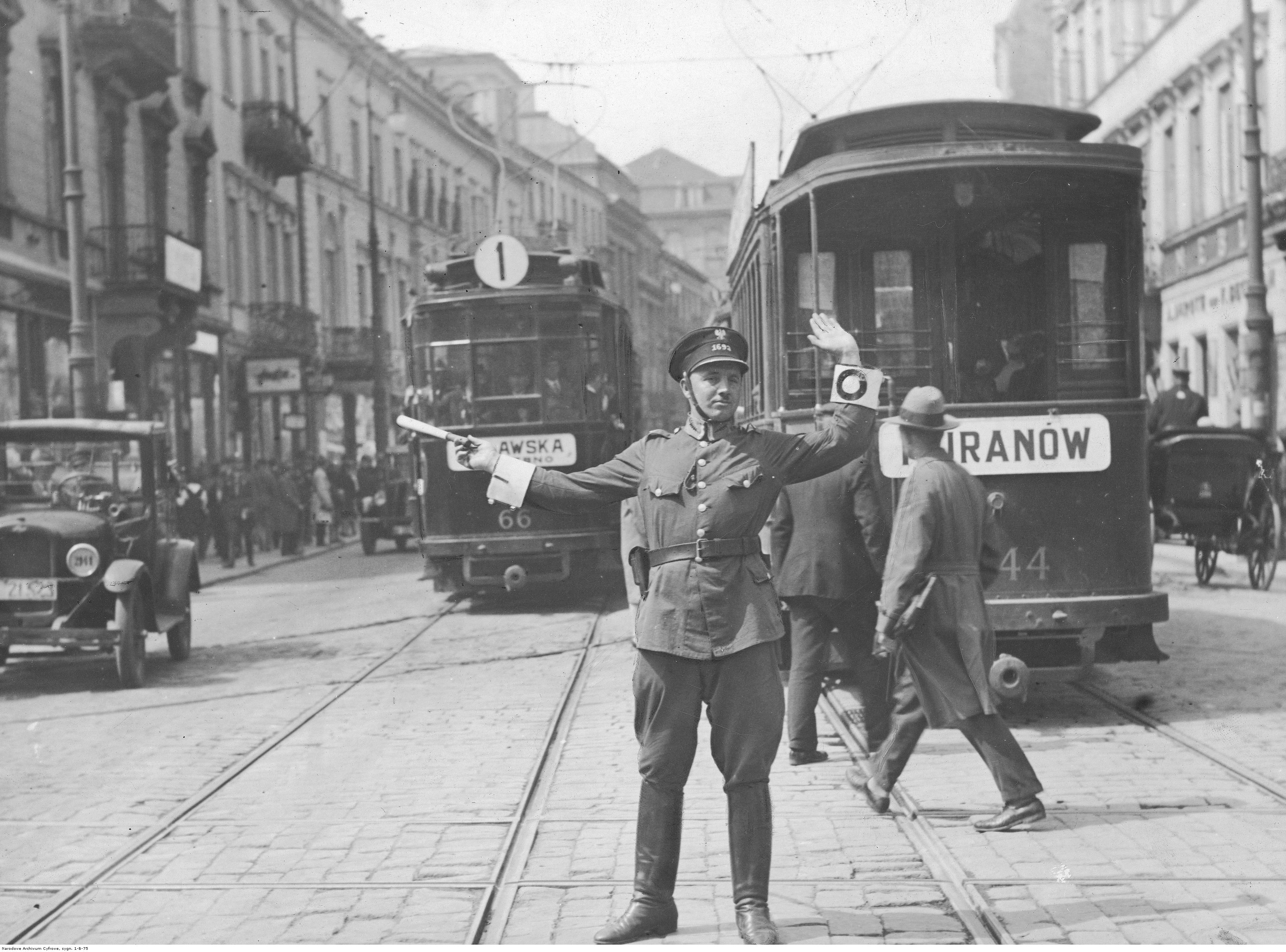
An officer directing traffic on Nowy Świat Street in Warsaw, 1929

The provisions of the act initially referred only to the area of the former Congress Poland. In the territories of the remaining partitions, separate police formations were created by district political centers. In the former Prussian partition, the People's Guard, later the Home Gendarmerie of the former Prussian District, and in the former Austrian partition, the State Gendarmerie. They were modeled on the organizational experiences of the former partitioning states. Separate Police of the Volhynian Lands and the Podolian Front, the Central Lithuanian State Police, and the Upper Silesian Police and the Upper Silesian Militia in the eastern area of Upper Silesia were established during the plebiscite period.

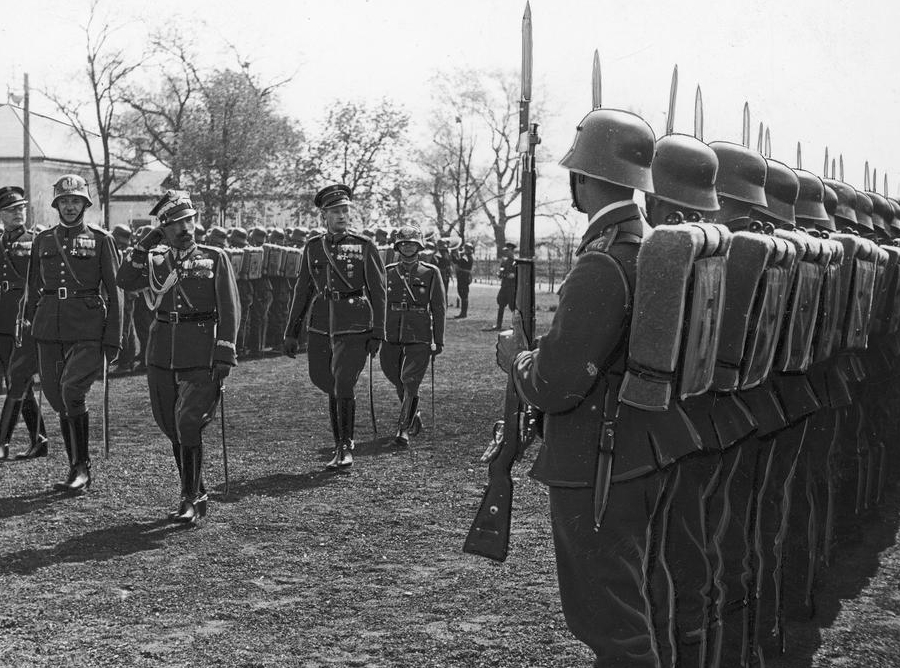
Ceremonial celebration of the 3rd anniversary of the establishment of the Reserve Police Group in Warsaw. The Commander-in-Chief of the State Police, General Kordian Józef Zamorski (saluting), walks in front of the reserve candidates, April 1939

The unification of police formations in the area of the Second Polish Republic took place gradually. The incorporation of the Galician Home Gendarmerie and the Field Police into the State Police took place on 1 December 1919, but the extension of the binding force of the above-mentioned act to the areas of Eastern and Western Lesser Poland took place only in the first quarter of 1920. In July of that year, the act began to be applied in the areas of Greater Poland and Gdańsk Pomerania. In the eastern territories it was in force from 8 January 1921, and in the Vilnius region from 18 July 1922. In the eastern Upper Silesia, an autonomous Silesian Province Police was established by the regulation of the voivode of Silesian Voivodeship on 17 June 1922. In the 1920s, numerous attempts were made to amend the Police Act. Ultimately, the State Police was reorganized by the regulation of the President of the Republic of Poland of 6 March 1928.

=== World War II ===
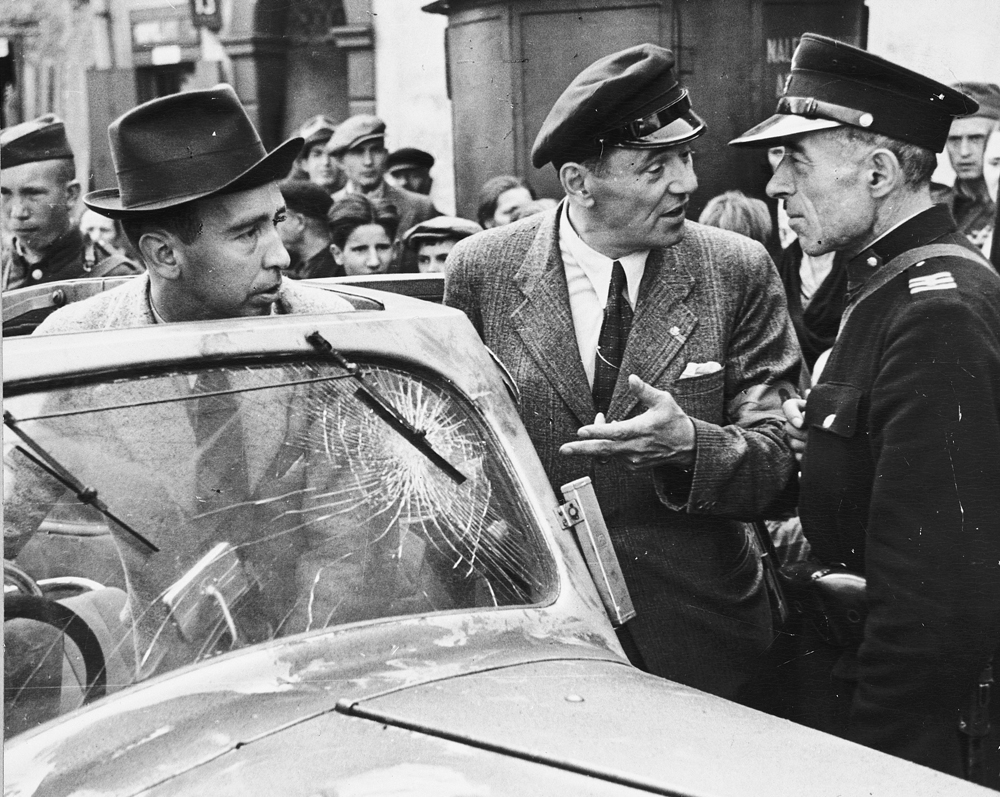
A Warsaw policeman talking to American journalist Julien Bryan in September 1939.

According to the previously prepared national defense plan, the police were to be transformed into a "military security service corps" additionally performing anti-sabotage and infrastructure protection functions. Due to the incomprehensible activities of the Ministry of Internal Affairs (some authors even speak of sabotage) during the Invasion of Poland, the police corps was not included in the defense system. Apart from a glorious episode in the defense of Warsaw, it played practically no role during this war. The police apparatus as a whole ceased to exist in the first decade of September, disintegrating during endless evacuations. Officers of the Main Command were interned in Romania, the files of the Central Archives of the State Police were taken over by the Soviets, and many officers died as a result of German and Soviet repressions after the front had passed. There were about 10,000 policemen in internment camps in Romania, Hungary, Lithuania and Latvia. One of the larger units that crossed the border was a unit under the command of Senior Commissioner (Major) Jan Zdanowicz, which consisted of 26 State Police officers and 792 State Police officers. This unit ended up in Romania in the town of Băile Gavora northwest of Bucharest near Râmnicu Vâlcea. Later, the State Police units and the army were distributed to several internment camps in Romania (including a camp for State Police privates in Comișani, as well as in the towns of Câmpulung, Călimănești, Turnu Severin, Tulcea on the Black Sea) and Hungary (there were at least three camps with a total of about 500 people). The Romanian population, to the best of their modest abilities, helped the refugees and went out of their way to help them, unfortunately, Polish units often caused brawls, mostly in a drunken state. Therefore, as a result of the riots caused by the military and police, the regulations for some camps were significantly tightened.

In September 1939, the State Police units numbered about 60,000 officers. It is difficult to determine the balance of the State Police losses in 1939. The number of those murdered and killed in combat in the country is currently estimated at about 2.5-3 thousand. The largest group, almost 12 thousand, was taken prisoner by the Soviets, of which almost 6 thousand, who were in the camp in Ostashkov, were murdered.

After the Invasion of Poland on September 1, 1939, the State Police, together with their families, was gradually withdrawn from areas threatened with direct military operations; only the commander of the capital city police in Warsaw, Marian Kozielewski, refused to carry out the order to evacuate, and the State Police corps he commanded took an active part in the defense of the city.

On October 26, 1939, the General Governor Hans Frank issued a regulation on security and order in the General Government. On its basis, on October 30, the Higher SS and Police Commander in the General Government issued a proclamation calling on all State Police officers to report, under threat of severe punishment, to German police offices or starosta offices. In this way, the Polish Police of the General Government was established, an auxiliary police formation of the German occupation authorities, colloquially called the Blue Police. It operated mainly based on pre-war police regulations. The occupier did not rebuild the pre-war police structure. The highest level was the county level. The structure of the Blue Police was both tolerated and to a high degree controlled by the Polish Underground State through the National Security Corps.

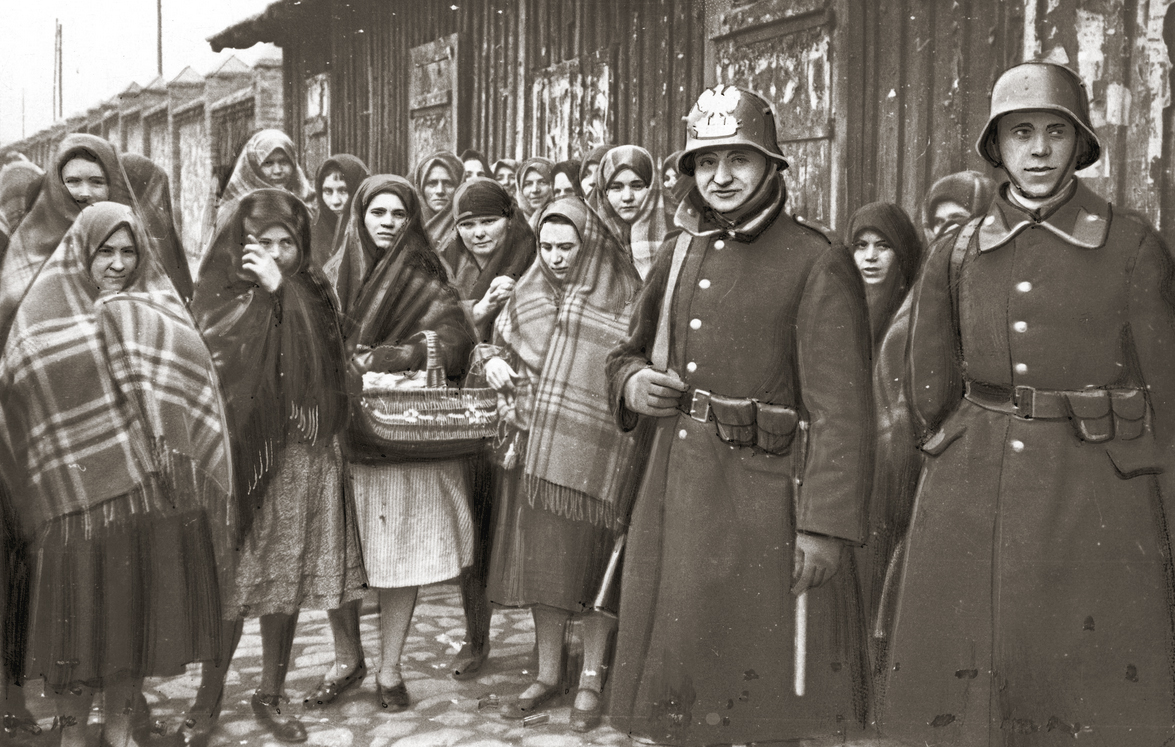
Miners' wives accompanied by officers waiting for the striking workers in the Klimontów mine, 1933

Neither in the territories directly annexed by Germany nor in the territories annexed by the Soviet Union did any Polish police formations exist, and officers were subjected to repression by both occupiers. In the territory of Poland occupied by the Soviet Union, police officers were arrested en masse immediately after the Soviet invasion of Poland on September 17, 1939 (or murdered on the spot)[18] and are one of the main groups of victims of the Katyn massacre. The camp in Ostashkov, whose prisoners were murdered in Tver in the spring of 1940, was intended by the NKVD exclusively for officers of the police, Border Guard, Border Protection Corps and other militarized formations of the Polish state. 169 officers who served in the XII District of the State Police (Pomeranian) based in Toruń during the interwar period are buried in Miednoje. The families of the arrested officers were deported by the NKVD to Siberia and Kazakh SSR in January and April 1940.

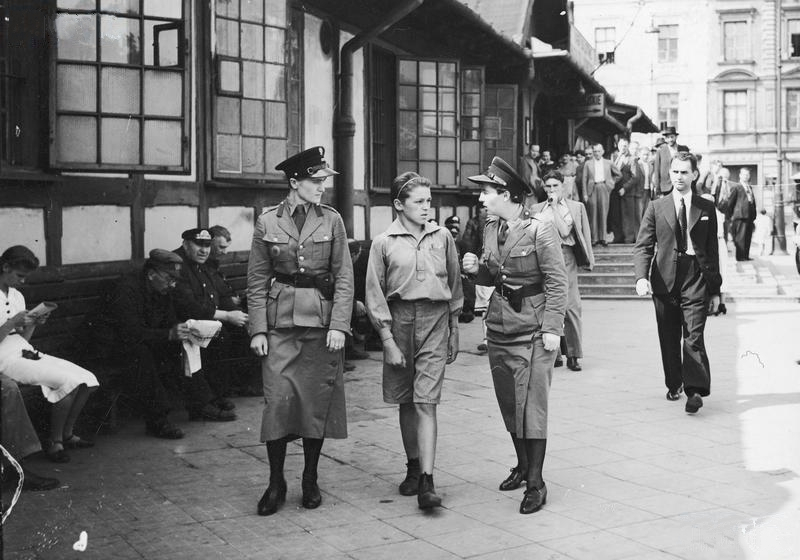
Two officers of the Women's Police escort a detained juvenile to a police detention center. In the background, the building of the so-called Main Temporary Railway Station on Chmielna Street in Warsaw, August 1939.

Formally, the State Police Corps was dissolved by the regulation of the Home Council of Ministers of 1 August 1944. At the same time, the regulation of the National Council of Ministers of 1 August 1944 on the temporary organization of the security service in Article 52 repealed, as of the date of entry into force, the regulation of the President of the Republic of Poland of 6 March 1928 on the State Police. On the other hand, the Polish Police of the General Government (Blue Police) was dissolved by the decree of the Polish Committee of National Liberation of 15 August 1944 on the dissolution of the state police, although it continued to function in the territories still under German occupation. Following the end of the war and the establishment of the Polish People's Republic, the Citizens' Militia became the principle police body of the communist state.

== Police brutality ==
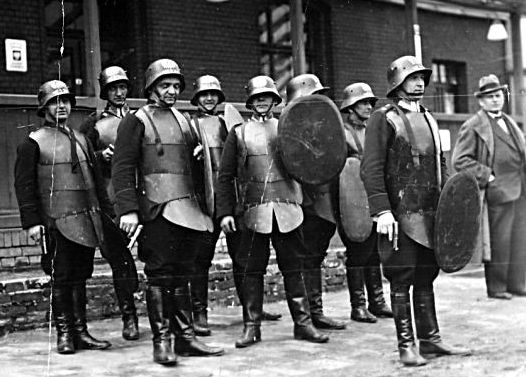
Reserve Police Unit designed to suppress street riots and demonstrations. The police were initially equipped with French helmets model 15, later with German Stahlhelms (pictured), metal armour protecting the torso and metal shields. Photo from the 1930s.

The state police were accused of brutality and rude treatment of poor people. Kazimierz Rudnicki, a prosecutor and judge between the wars, wrote in his memoirs: "It is known that the police beat. They beat in order to extract a confession of guilt, to detect people who were in any way connected with the crime committed, to extract things obtained through murder or theft". Stefania Sempołowska, the author of the report "In Prisons", shared the same opinion, in which she wrote, among other things, that "torture usually accompanies police investigations in the Borderlands, and is not uncommon in the centre of the country". The Sejm Commission for the Investigation of Cases of Abuse and Mistreatment of Prisoners, specially established to investigate allegations of police brutality, stated in 1926 that "the torture of prisoners often amounted to bestiality" and "the prosecutor's authorities react very weakly or do not react at all to prisoners' complaints about beatings in police offices".

During the interwar period, the State Police was used to suppress demonstrations and peasant strikes. These interventions very often ended in numerous fatalities among demonstrators and strikers. During a workers' demonstration in Ostrowiec Świętokrzyski in 1926, 5 people were killed as a result of police intervention. Such brutal action led to riots in the city, which were ended only by military intervention. In 1933, at a rally in Piasek Wielkie organized on the occasion of the harvest festival, attended by Wincenty Witos, during a police intervention, one of the farmers from the village of Młyny was killed and several others were injured. Former Prime Minister Wincenty Witos escaped from police arrest by running away.

== See also ==
- Polish Armed Forces of the Second Polish Republic
- Border Protection Corps
