= Turza, Lesser Poland Voivodeship =

Turza
- Village
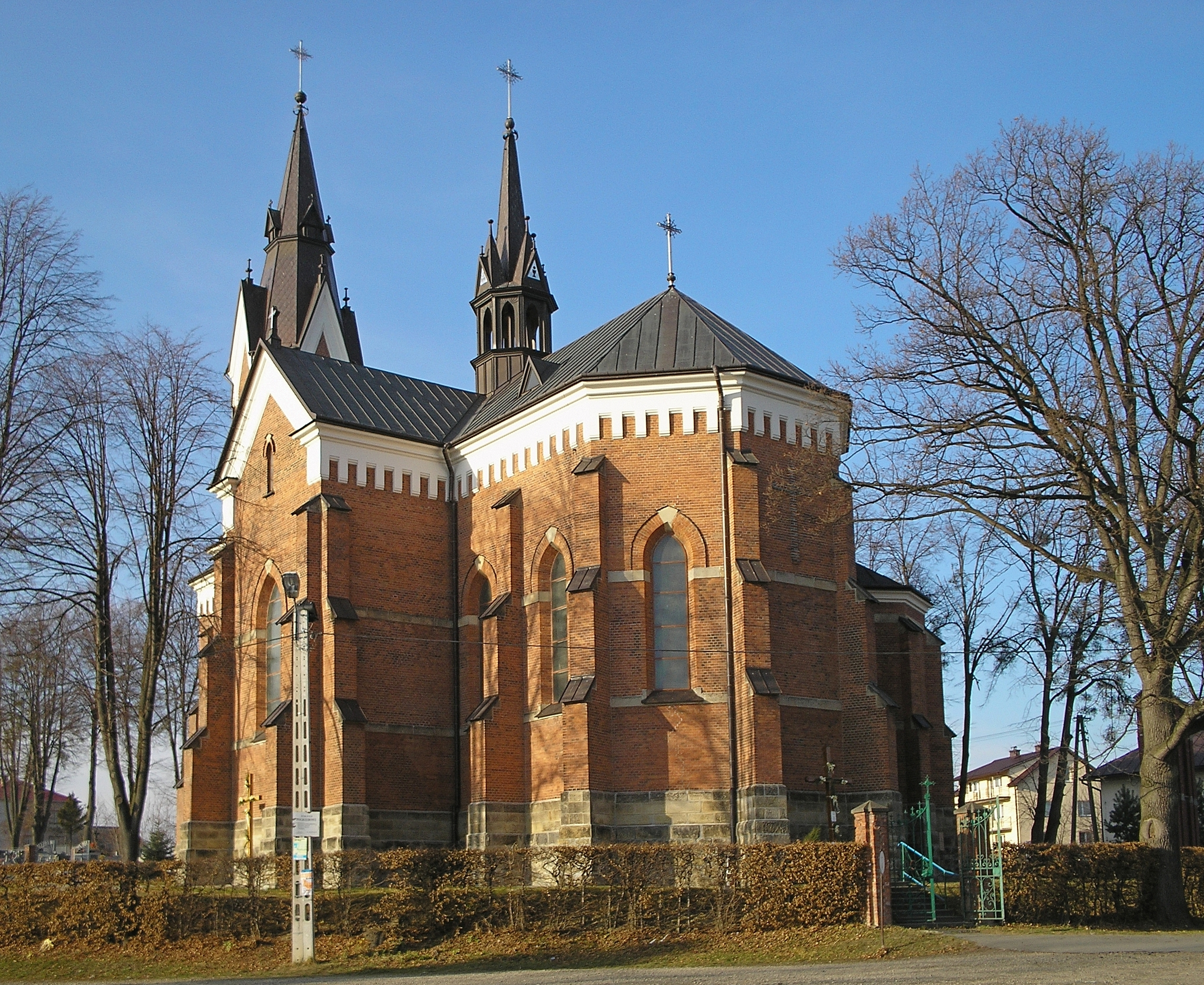
- Church of Saint Catherine

- Location within Poland
- Coordinates: 49°45′54″N 21°3′53″E
- Country: Poland
- Voivodeship: Lesser Poland
- County: Tarnów
- Gmina: Rzepiennik Strzyżewski

Population
  - Total: 1,100

Turza [ˈtuʐa] is a village in the administrative district of Gmina Rzepiennik Strzyżewski, within Tarnów County, Lesser Poland Voivodeship, in southern Poland.
