= Gmina Rzepiennik Strzyżewski =

Gmina Rzepiennik Strzyżewski Rzepiennik Strzyżewski Commune
- Gmina
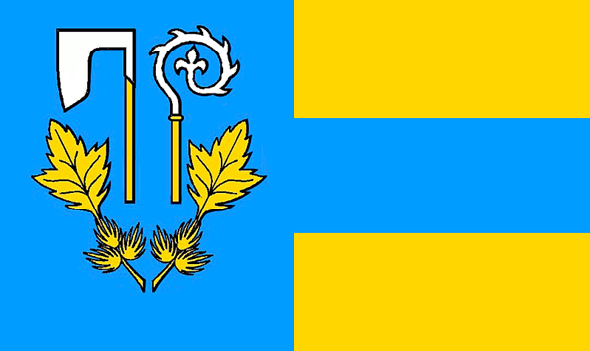
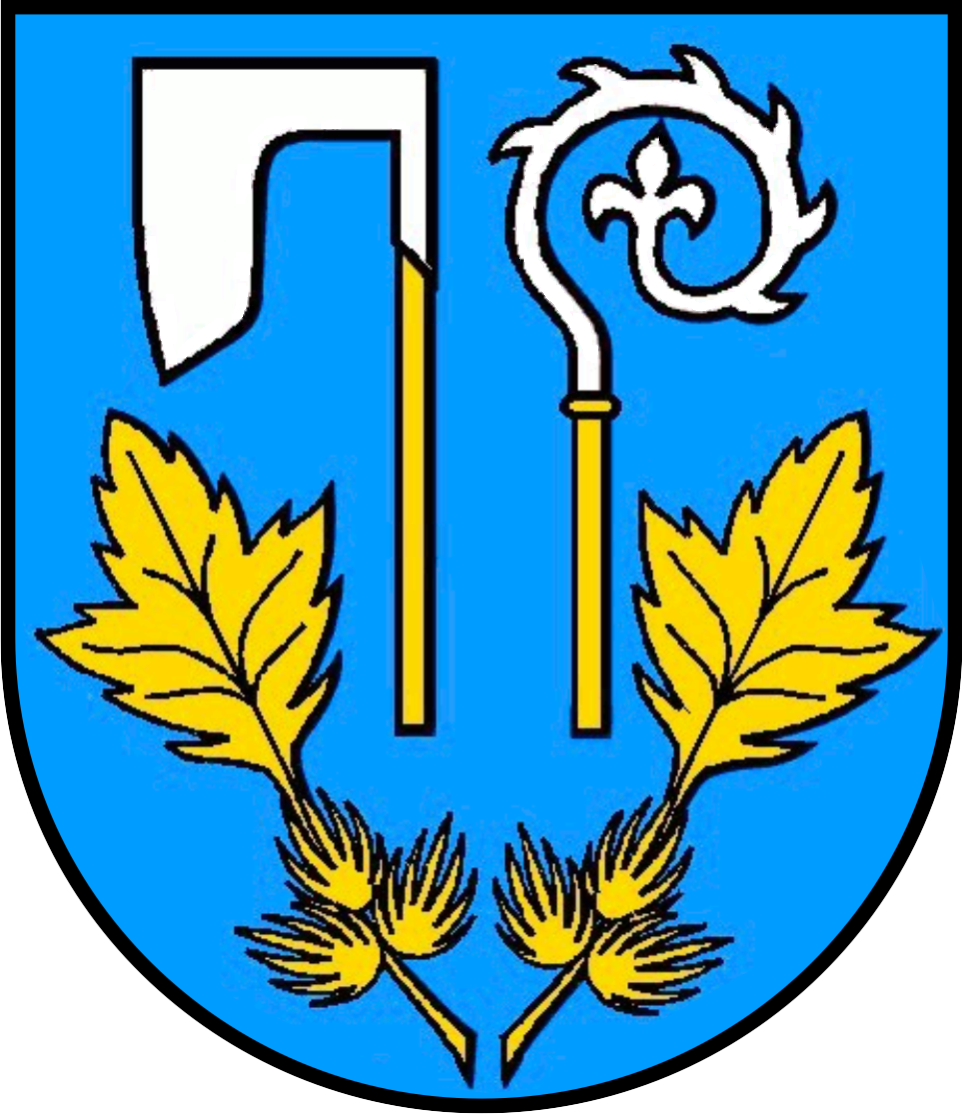
- Flag Coat of arms
- Interactive map of Gmina Rzepiennik Strzyżewski
- Coordinates (Rzepiennik Strzyżewski): 49°48′N 21°3′E
- Country: Poland
- Voivodeship: Lesser Poland
- County: Tarnów County
- Seat: Rzepiennik Strzyżewski

Area
  - Total: 70.23 km^{2} (27.12 sq mi)

Population (2006)
  - Total: 6,832
  - Density: 97.28/km^{2} (252.0/sq mi)
- Website: https://rzepiennik.pl/

Gmina Rzepiennik Strzyżewski is a rural gmina (administrative district) in Tarnów County, Lesser Poland Voivodeship, in southern Poland. Its seat is the village of Rzepiennik Strzyżewski, which lies approximately 27 kilometres (17 mi) south of Tarnów and 85 km (53 mi) east of the regional capital Kraków.

The gmina covers an area of 70.23 square kilometres (27.1 sq mi), and as of 2006 its total population is 6,832.

The gmina contains part of the protected area called Ciężkowice-Rożnów Landscape Park.

== Villages ==
Gmina Rzepiennik Strzyżewski contains the villages and settlements of Kołkówka, Olszyny, Rzepiennik Biskupi, Rzepiennik Strzyżewski, Rzepiennik Suchy and Turza.

== Neighbouring gminas ==
Gmina Rzepiennik Strzyżewski is bordered by the gminas of Biecz, Ciężkowice, Gromnik, Moszczenica, Szerzyny and Tuchów.
