= Kołkówka =

- Village
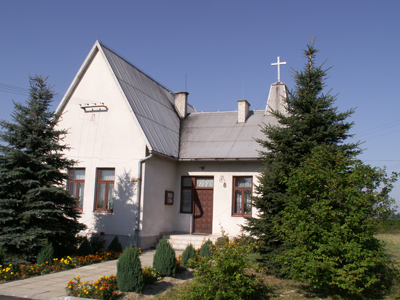
- Chapel

- Location within Poland
- Coordinates: 49°48′58″N 21°6′2″E
- Country: Poland
- Voivodeship: Lesser Poland
- County: Tarnów
- Gmina: Rzepiennik Strzyżewski

Kołkówka [kɔu̯ˈkufka] is a village in the administrative district of Gmina Rzepiennik Strzyżewski, within Tarnów County, Lesser Poland Voivodeship, in southern Poland.
