= Rzepiennik Strzyżewski =

- Village
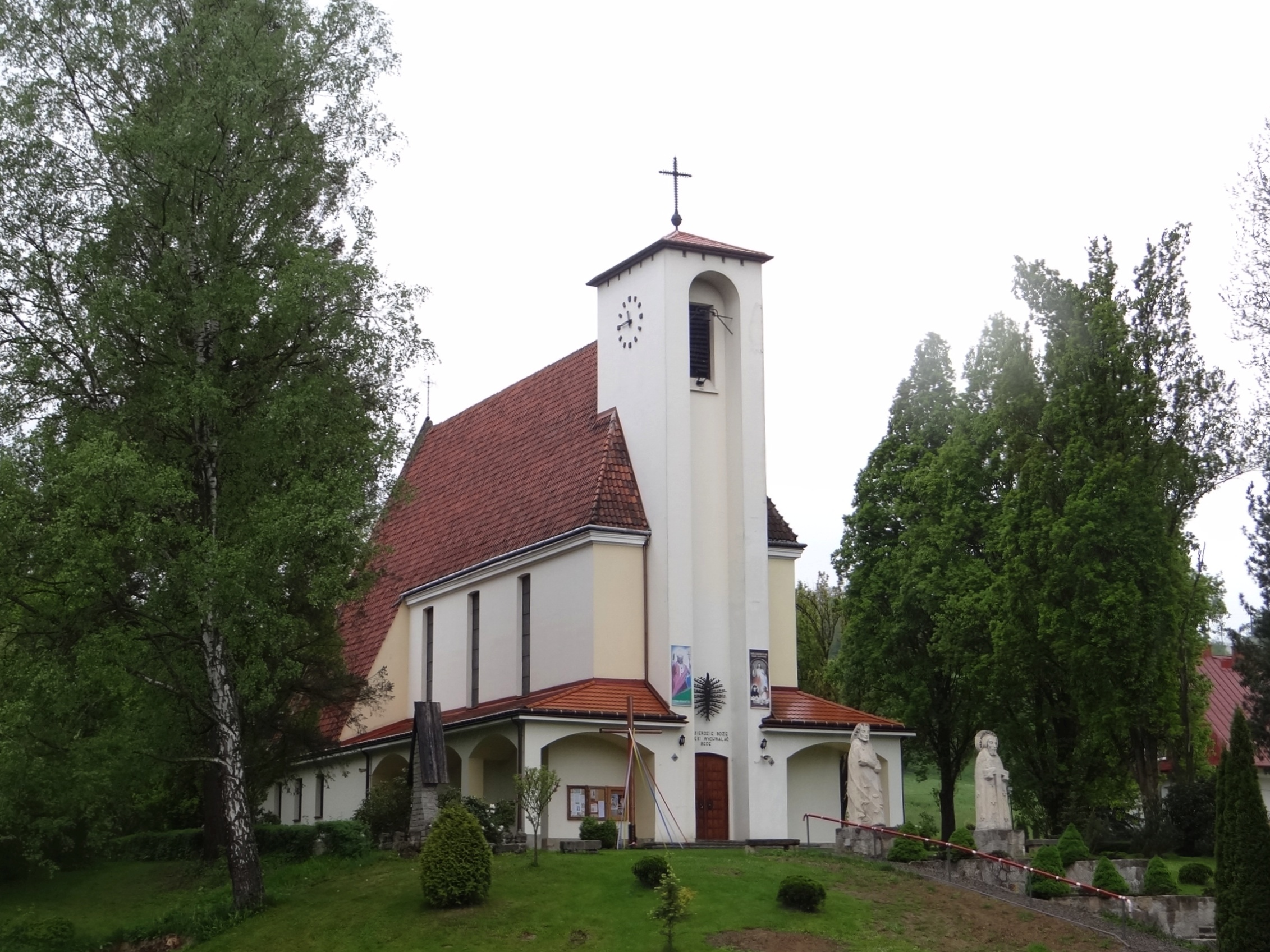
- Church of the Divine Mercy

- Location within Poland
- Coordinates: 49°48′N 21°3′E
- Country: Poland
- Voivodeship: Lesser Poland
- County: Tarnów
- Gmina: Rzepiennik Strzyżewski

Population
  - Total: 1,400
- Time zone: UTC+1 (CET)
  - Summer (DST): UTC+2 (CEST)
- Vehicle registration: KTA

Rzepiennik Strzyżewski [ʐɛˈpjɛnnik stʂɨˈʐɛfski] is a village in Tarnów County, Lesser Poland Voivodeship, in southern Poland. It is the seat of the gmina (administrative district) called Gmina Rzepiennik Strzyżewski.

Town rights were granted in 1775 and revoked in 1896.
