= Rzepiennik Suchy =

- Village
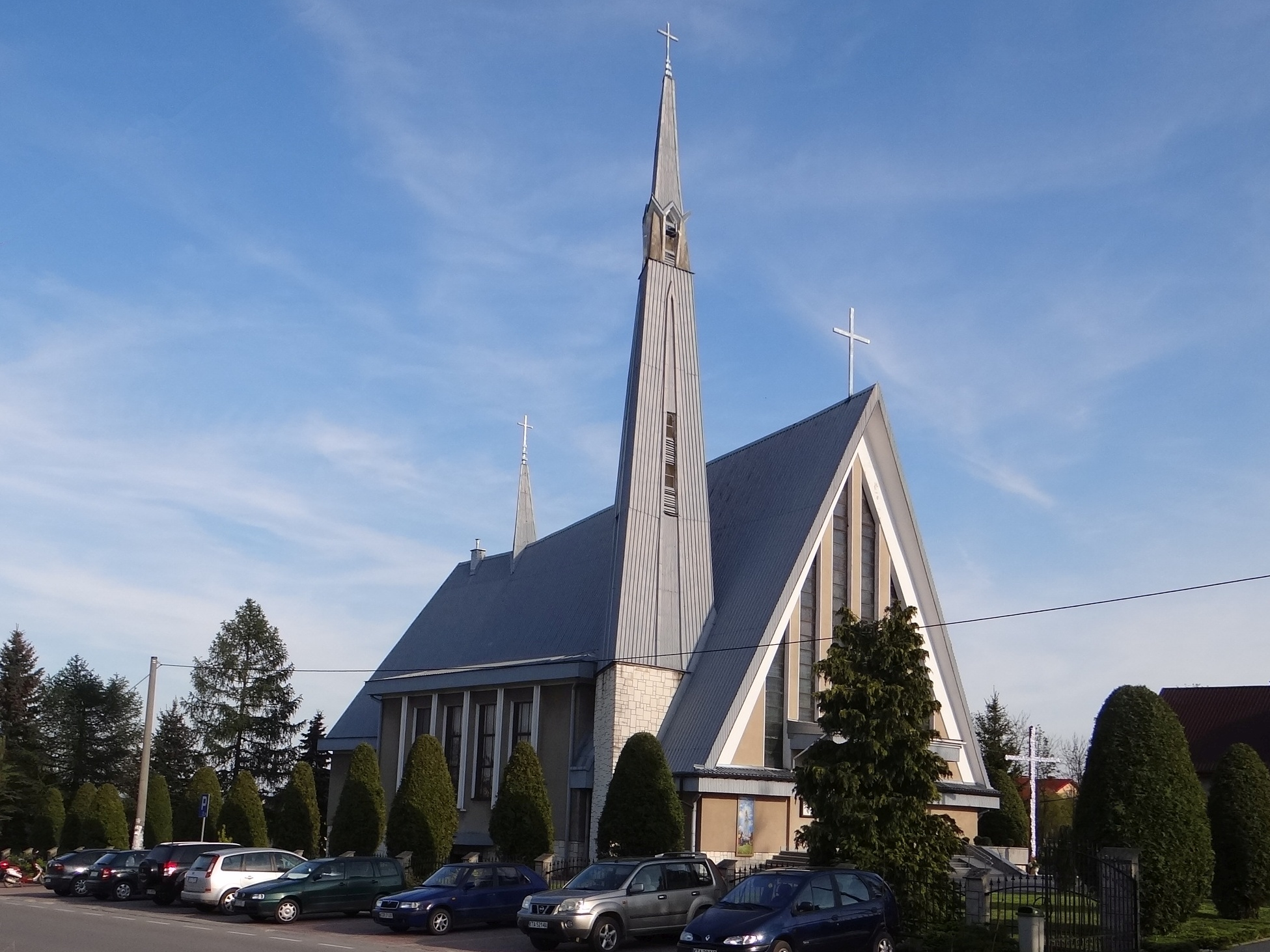
- Catholic church

- Location within Poland
- Coordinates: 49°47′N 21°7′E
- Country: Poland
- Voivodeship: Lesser Poland
- County: Tarnów
- Gmina: Rzepiennik Strzyżewski

Rzepiennik Suchy [ʐɛˈpjɛnnik ˈsuxɨ] is a village in the administrative district of Gmina Rzepiennik Strzyżewski, within Tarnów County, Lesser Poland Voivodeship, in southern Poland.
