= Rzepiennik Biskupi =

- Village
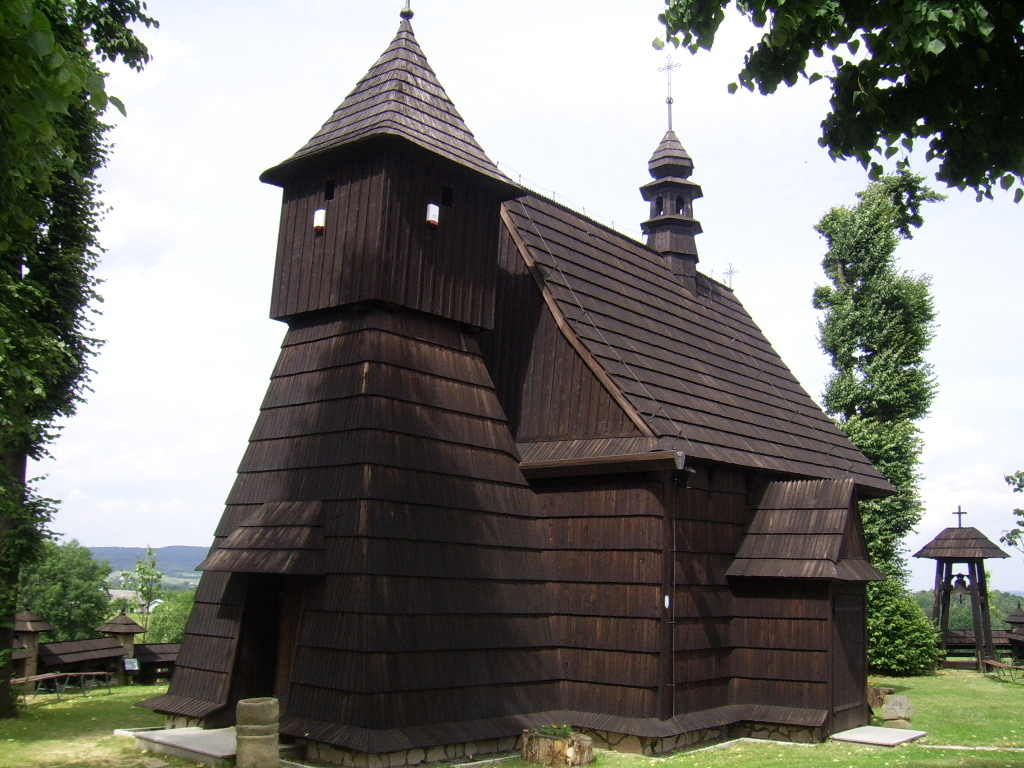
- St. John the Baptist Church, 16th century

- Location within Poland
- Coordinates: 49°48′N 21°5′E
- Country: Poland
- Voivodeship: Lesser Poland
- County: Tarnów
- Gmina: Rzepiennik Strzyżewski

Rzepiennik Biskupi [ʐɛˈpjɛnnik bisˈkupi] is a village in the administrative district of Gmina Rzepiennik Strzyżewski, within Tarnów County, Lesser Poland Voivodeship, in southern Poland.
